= List of Bienes de Interés Cultural in Asturias =

This is a list of Bien de Interés Cultural landmarks in Asturias, Spain.

- Balsera Palace
- Camposagrado Palace (Oviedo)
- Capilla de Santa Eugenia de Sobrecueva
- Capilla de Santo Medero (Isongo)
- Castle of Soto (Aller)
- Chao Samartín
- Church of St. Felix, El Pino
- Church of San Esteban (Ciaño)
- Church of San Esteban de Aramil
- Church of San Jorge (Manzaneda)
- Church of San Juan de Berbío
- Church of San Juan Apóstol y Evangelista, Santianes de Pravia
- Church of San Martín de Luiña
- Church of San Pedro de Nora
- Church of Santa Eulalia de la Lloraza
- Church of Santa Eulalia de Ujo
- Church of Santa María de Bendones
- Church of Santa María de Celón
- Church of Santa María de Junco
- Church of Santa María de Llas
- Church of Santa María de Sabada
- Church of Santa María de Sariegomuerto
- Church of Santa María de Villanueva
- Church of San Salvador de Priesca
- Church of San Salvador de Valdediós
- Church of Santiago de Gobiendes
- Church of Santo Adriano de Tuñón
- Church of the Monastery of San Miguel de Bárcena
- Colegiata de San Pedro de Teverga
- Colegiata de Santa María la Mayor (Salas)
- Colegiata de Santa María Magdalena
- Colombres (Ribadedeva)
- Cudillero
- Díaz Inguanzo Palace
- Ermita de la Magdalena (Monsacro)
- Ferrera Palace
- Gobiendes Palace
- Hermitage of Santa Cristina
- Iglesia de San Andrés (Bedriñana)
- Iglesia de San Andrés (Valdebárzana)
- Iglesia de San Emeterio (Sietes)
- Iglesia de San Esteban (Sograndio)
- Iglesia de Santa Eulalia (Selorio)
- Iglesia de San Juan (Amandi)
- Iglesia de San Juan (Camoca)
- Iglesia de San Juan (Priorio)
- Iglesia de San Nicolás (Villoria)
- Iglesia de San Pedro (Mestas de Con)
- Iglesia de San Salvador (Fuentes)
- Iglesia de Santo Tomás (Coro)
- Iglesia de San Vicente (Serrapio)
- Iglesia de Santa Cecilia (Careñes)
- Iglesia de Santa Eulalia (Abamia)
- Iglesia de Santa María (Arbazal)
- Iglesia de Santa María (Luanco)
- Iglesia de Santa María (Lugás)
- Iglesia de Santa María (Piedeloro)
- Iglesia de Santa María (Sebrayo)
- Iglesia de Santa María (Tanes)
- Iglesia de Santa María (Villamayor)
- Iglesia de Santa María de la Oliva (Villaviciosa)
- Iglesia de Santa María del Conceyu (Llanes)
- Iglesia de Santa Marina (Puerto de Vega)
- Iglesia de Santiago (Arlós)
- Iglesia de Santiago el Mayor (Sariego)
- Iglesia de Santo Tomás de Cantorbery (Avilés)
- La Foncalada
- Las Caldas Cave
- Maqua Palace
- Mayorazgo Palace
- Miranda Palace
- Monasterio de Santa María de Valdediós
- Monasterio de San Martín de Salas
- Monasterio de San Salvador (Cornellana)
- Monastery of Santa María de Villanueva de Oscos
- Monastery of San Pedro de Villanueva
- Monastery of San Vicente de Oviedo
- Muniellos Nature Reserve
- Museum of Fine Arts of Asturias
- Oviedo Cathedral
- Palacio de Doriga
- Palace of Cienfuegos de Peñalba
- Palace of la Espriella en Villahormes
- Palacio Valdés Theatre
- Plaza de Toros de El Bibio
- Royal Collegiate church of San Fernando
- San Antolín de Bedón (Llanes)
- San Isidoro, Oviedo
- San Juan Bautista de Corias
- San Julián de los Prados
- San Miguel de Lillo
- San Tirso, Oviedo
- Santa Cueva de Covadonga
- Santa María del Naranco
- Santo Domingo, Oviedo
- Sidrón Cave
- Tito Bustillo Cave
- Tower of Llanes
- Villaviciosa
