= Church of Santa María de Villanueva =

Coordinates: 43.1488°N 6.1403°W

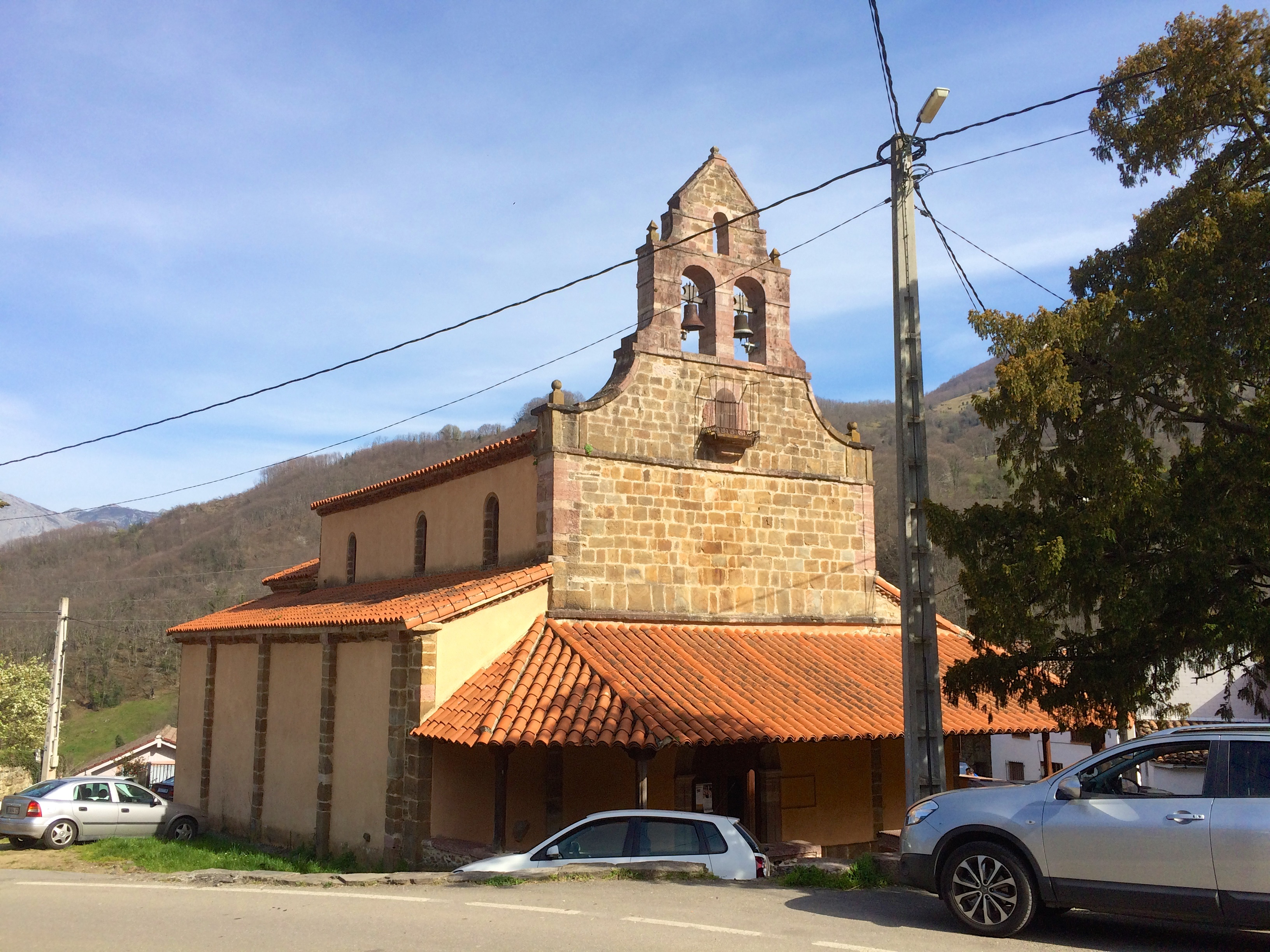
- Church of Santa María de Villanueva
- Location: Asturias, Spain

The Church of Santa María de Villanueva (Spanish: Iglesia de Santa María de Villanueva) is a Romanesque-style, Roman Catholic parish church in the diocese of Villanueva, in the municipality of Teverga, community of Asturias, Spain.

While elements including the sculpted capitals of the internal column-pilasters flanking the nave date to prior to the 12th-century, the church has undergone subsequent refurbishments.

== See also ==
- Monasterio de Santa María de Villanueva de Oscos
