= Covadonga =

Covadonga/Cuadonga
- Parish
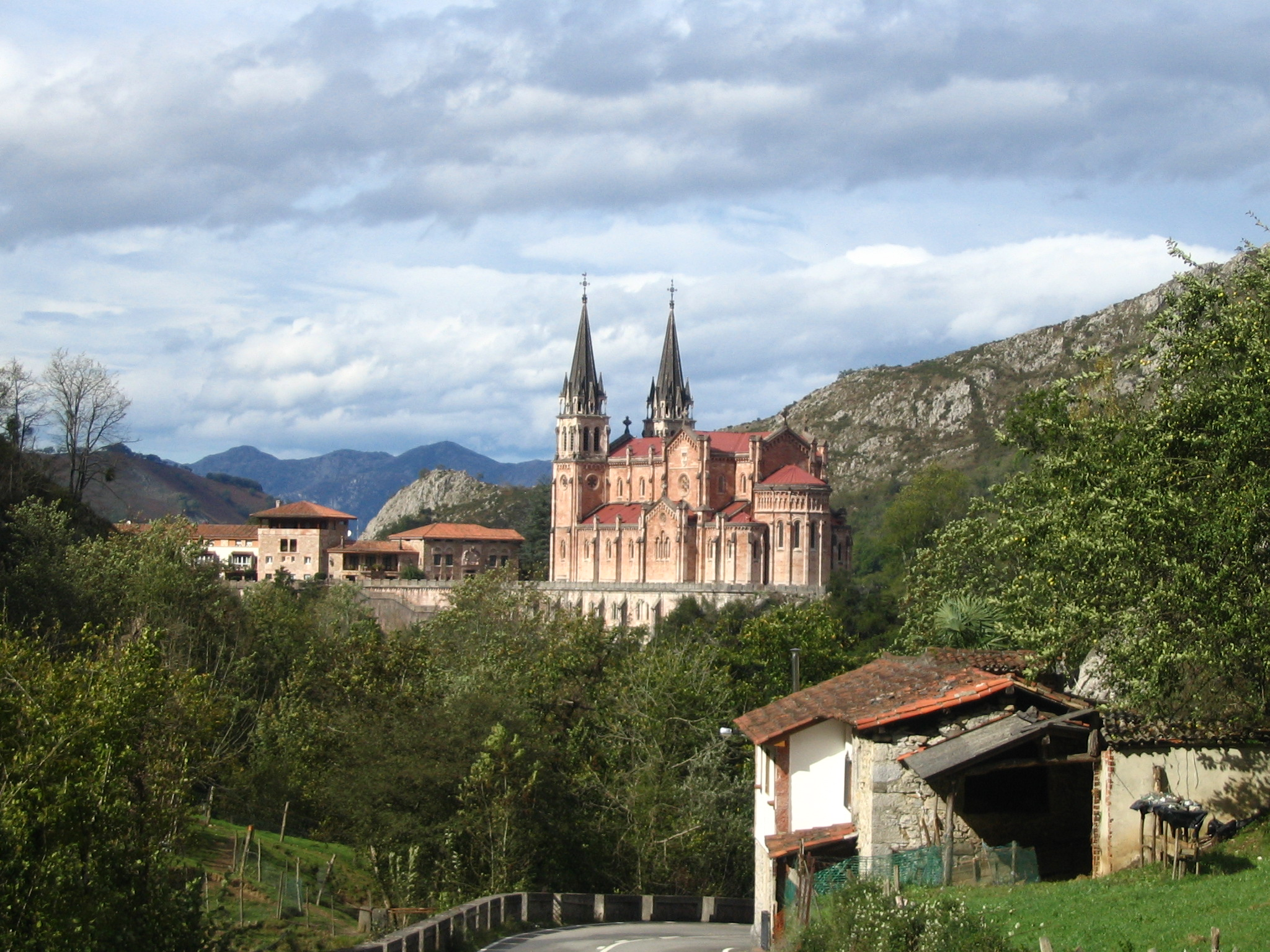
- The Basílica de Santa María la Real de Covadonga

- Location within Spain
- Coordinates: 43.316667°N 5.05°W
- Country: Spain
- Autonomous community: Asturias
- Province: Asturias
- Municipality: Cangas de Onís

Population
  - Total: 55

Covadonga (Asturian: Cuadonga, from cova domnica "Cave of Our Lady") is one of 11 parishes in Cangas de Onís, a municipality within the province and autonomous community of Asturias, in Northwestern Spain. It is in the Picos de Europa mountains. With a permanent population of 55, the parish became a site of pilgrimage and a place of great cultural importance following the 722 Battle of Covadonga, which marked the beginning of the Spanish Reconquista of the Iberian Peninsula. The battle, which supposedly took place near the village in 722, was the first Christian victory in the Iberian Peninsula over the Arabs invading from north Africa under the Umayyad banner, and is often considered to be the beginning of the almost eight-century-long effort to expel Muslim rulers governing Iberia during the Reconquista. However, many modern historians do now dispute the importance of the battle and whether or not it even took place at all.

The two lakes of Covadonga, Enol and Ercina, are located in the mountains above the town, and the road leading to the lakes is often featured in the Vuelta a España bicycle race. The Holy Cave of Covadonga is a monument dedicated to Our Lady of Covadonga that commemorates the Battle of Covadonga. It comprises the following:

- Basílica de Santa María la Real de Covadonga ("Basilica of Saint Mary the Royal of Covadonga"), a church built in the 19th century based on a design by Roberto Frassinelli;
- Santa Cueva de Covadonga ("Holy Cave of Covadonga"), in which the bodies of Kings Pelagius and Alfonso I lie;
- Collegiate church of Nuestra Señora de Covadonga, built in the 16th century and declared a Bien de Interés Cultural ("Property of Cultural Interest") in 1884;
- Monasterio de San Pedro ("Monastery of Saint Peter"); and
- Esplanade, with the Museum of the Real Sitio de Covadonga ("Royal Site of Covadonga").

== Gallery ==
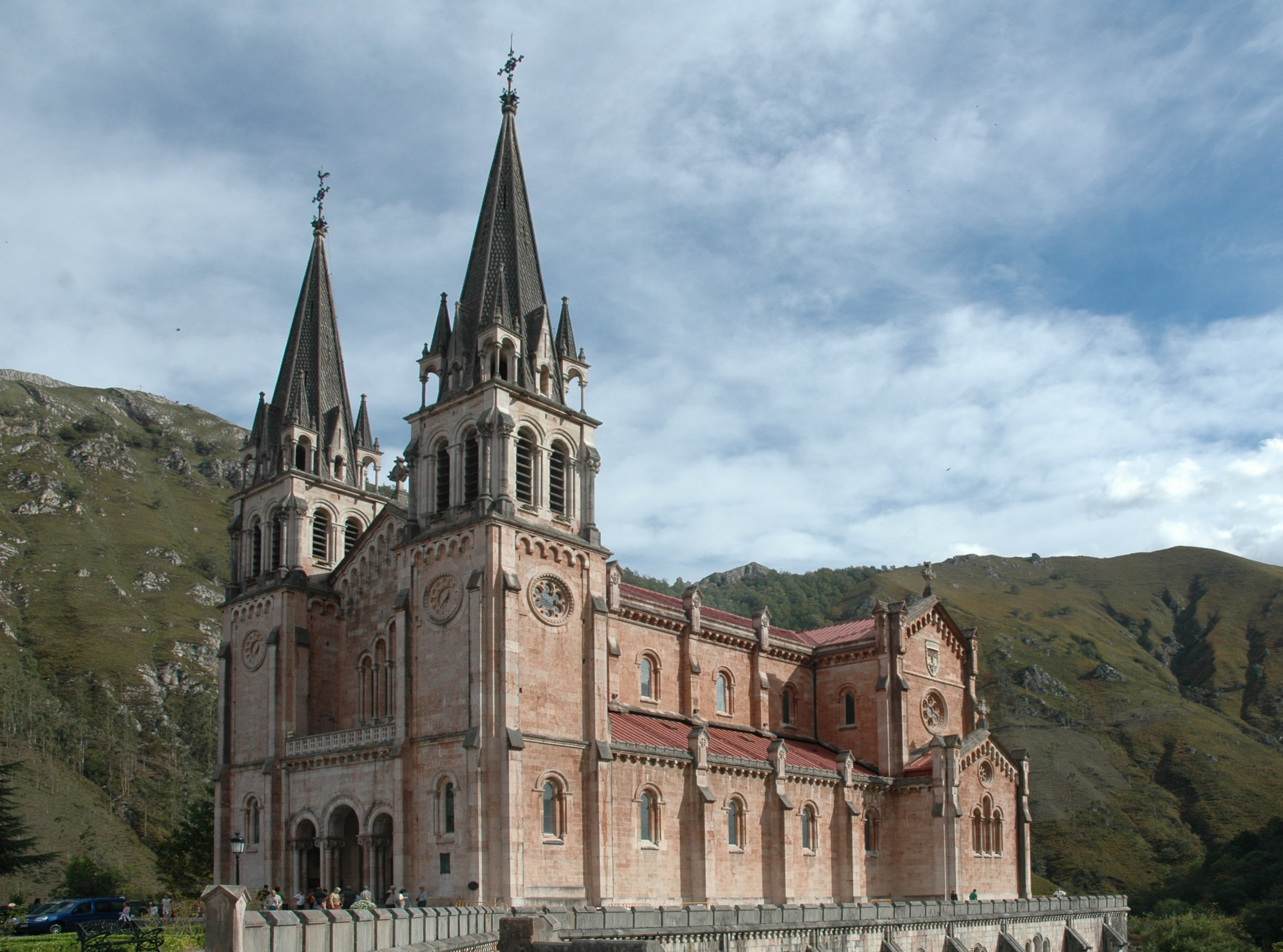
Basilica of Santa María la Real of Covadonga

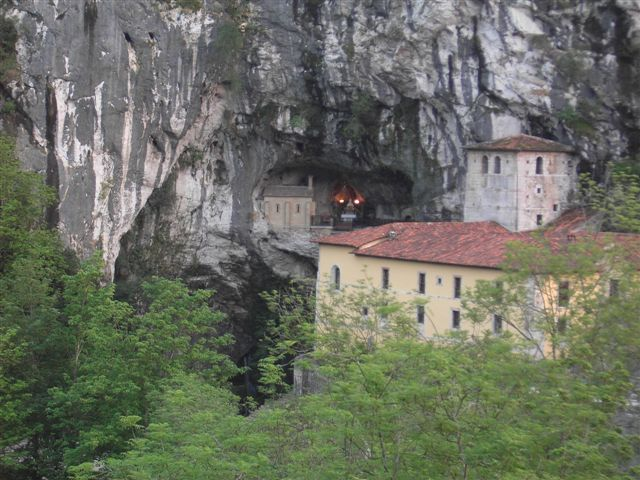
Cueva de Santa María

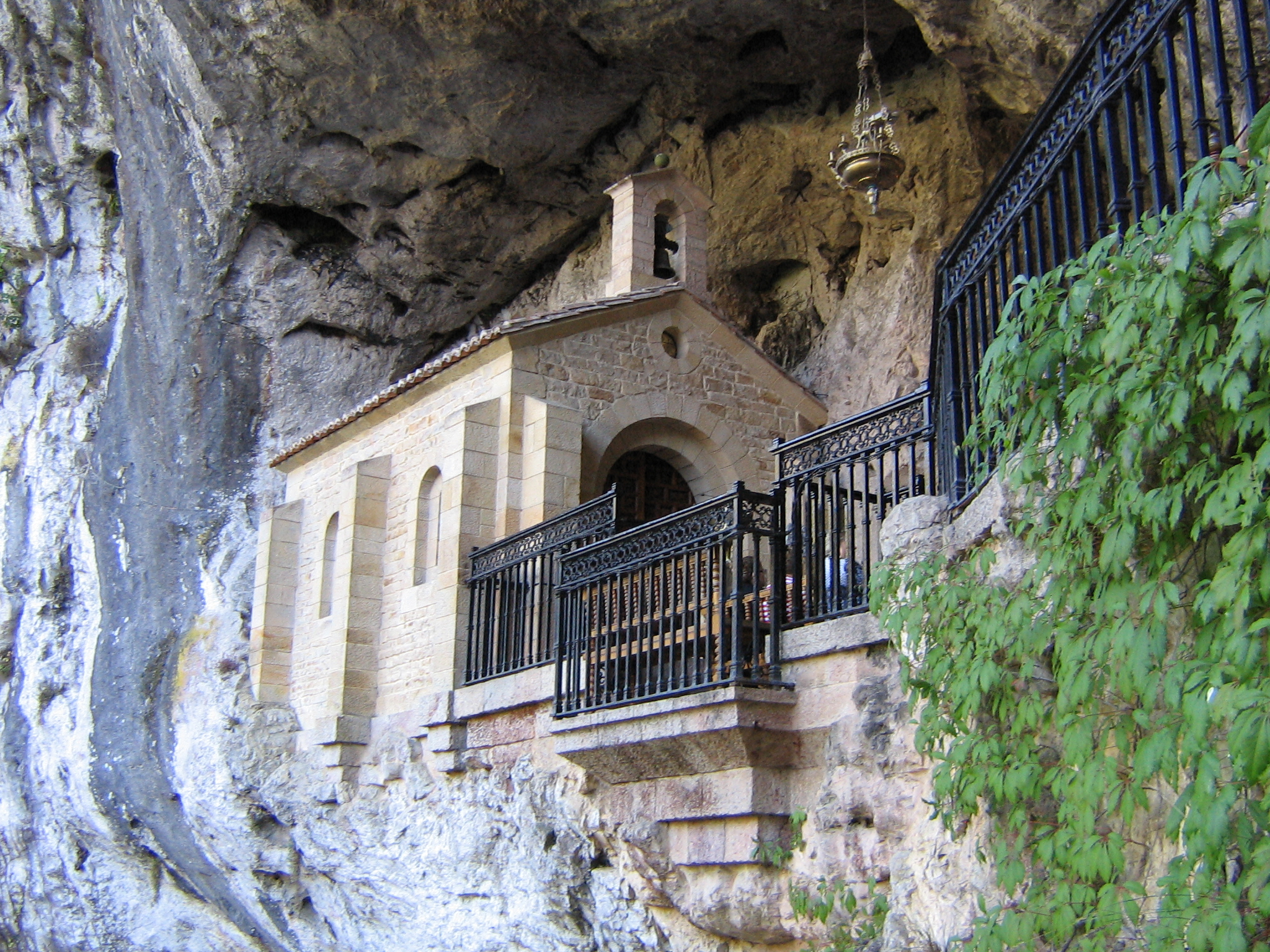
Hermitage

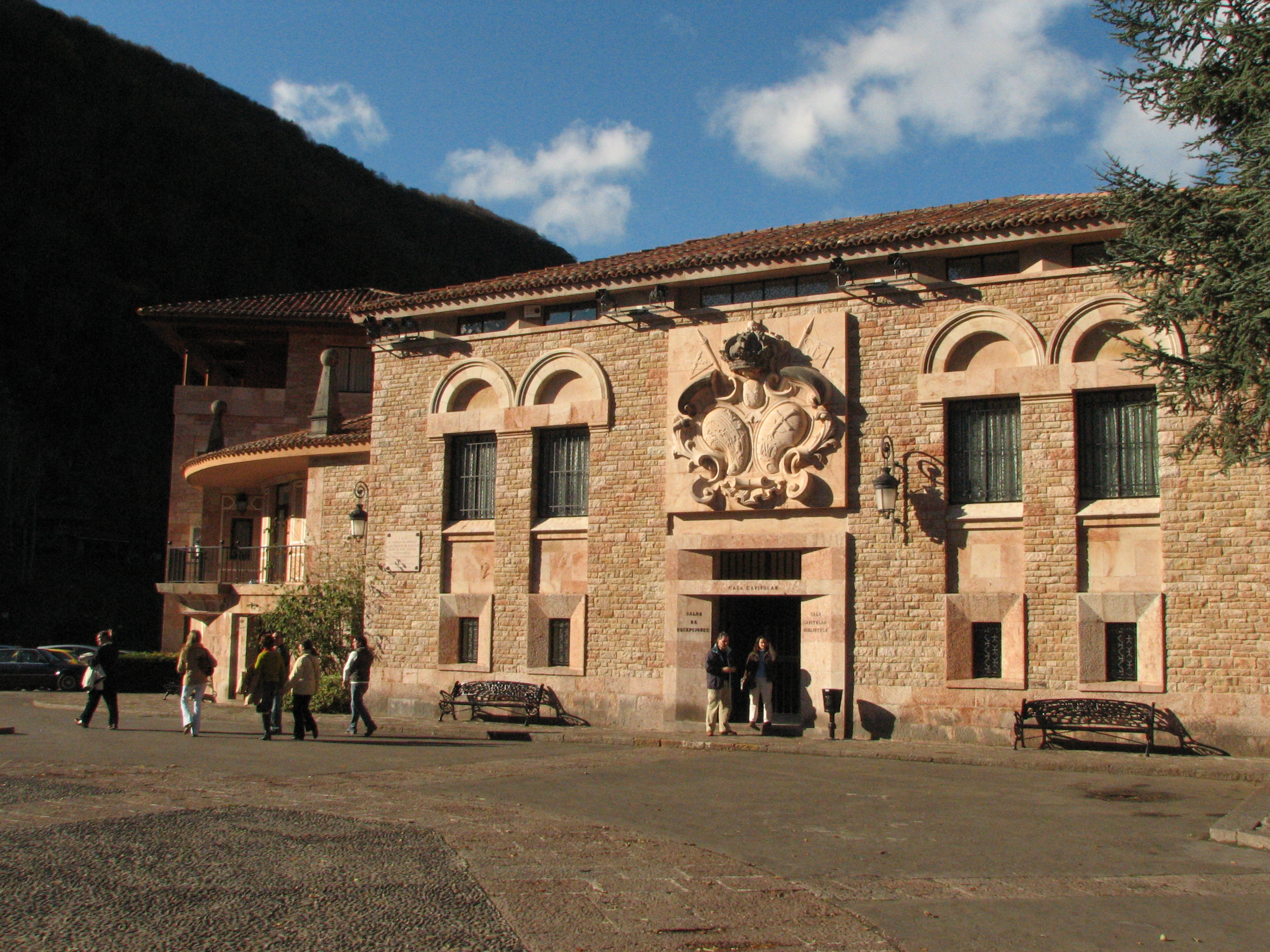
Chapter House

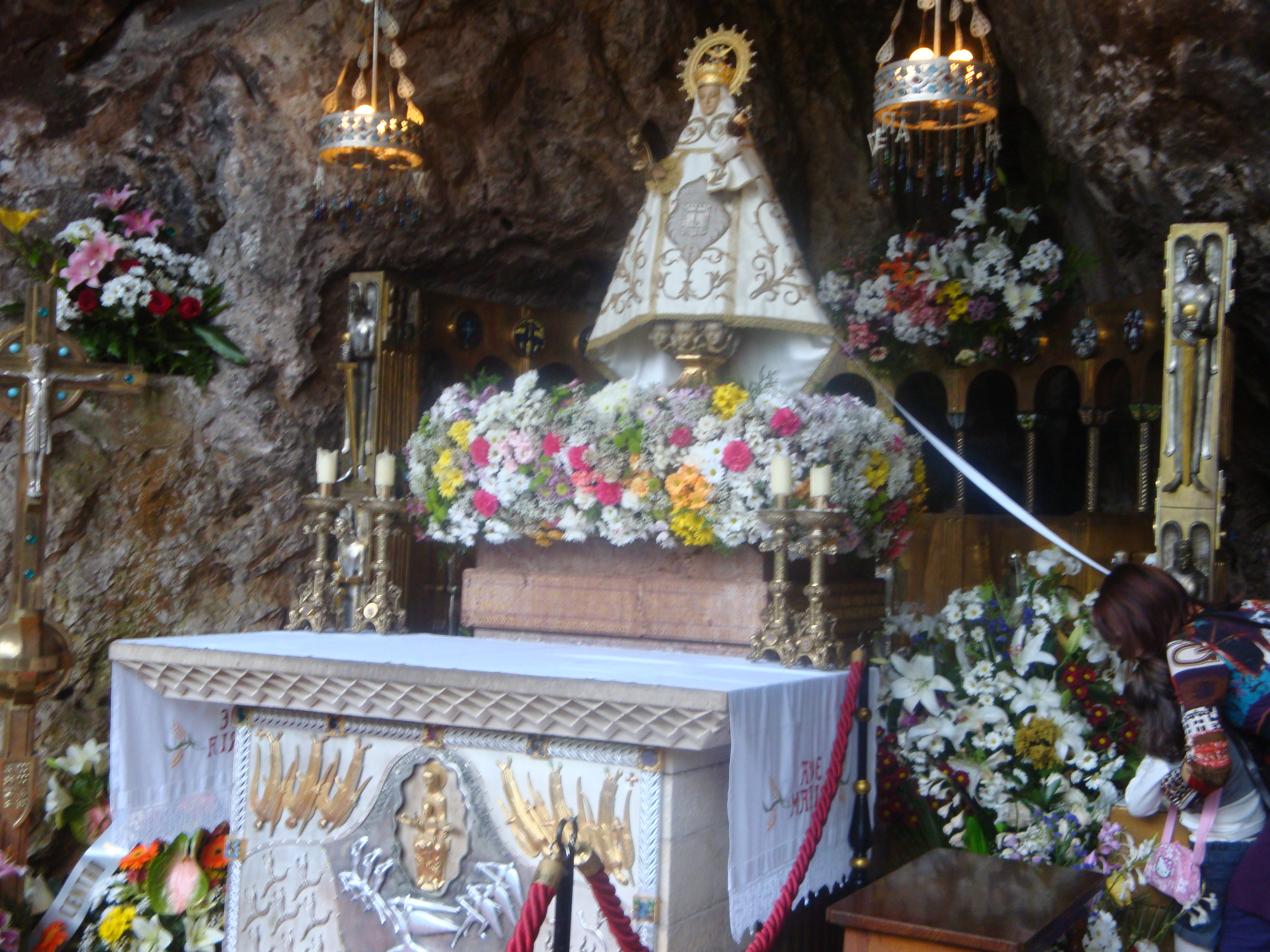
Shrine of Our Lady of Covadonga

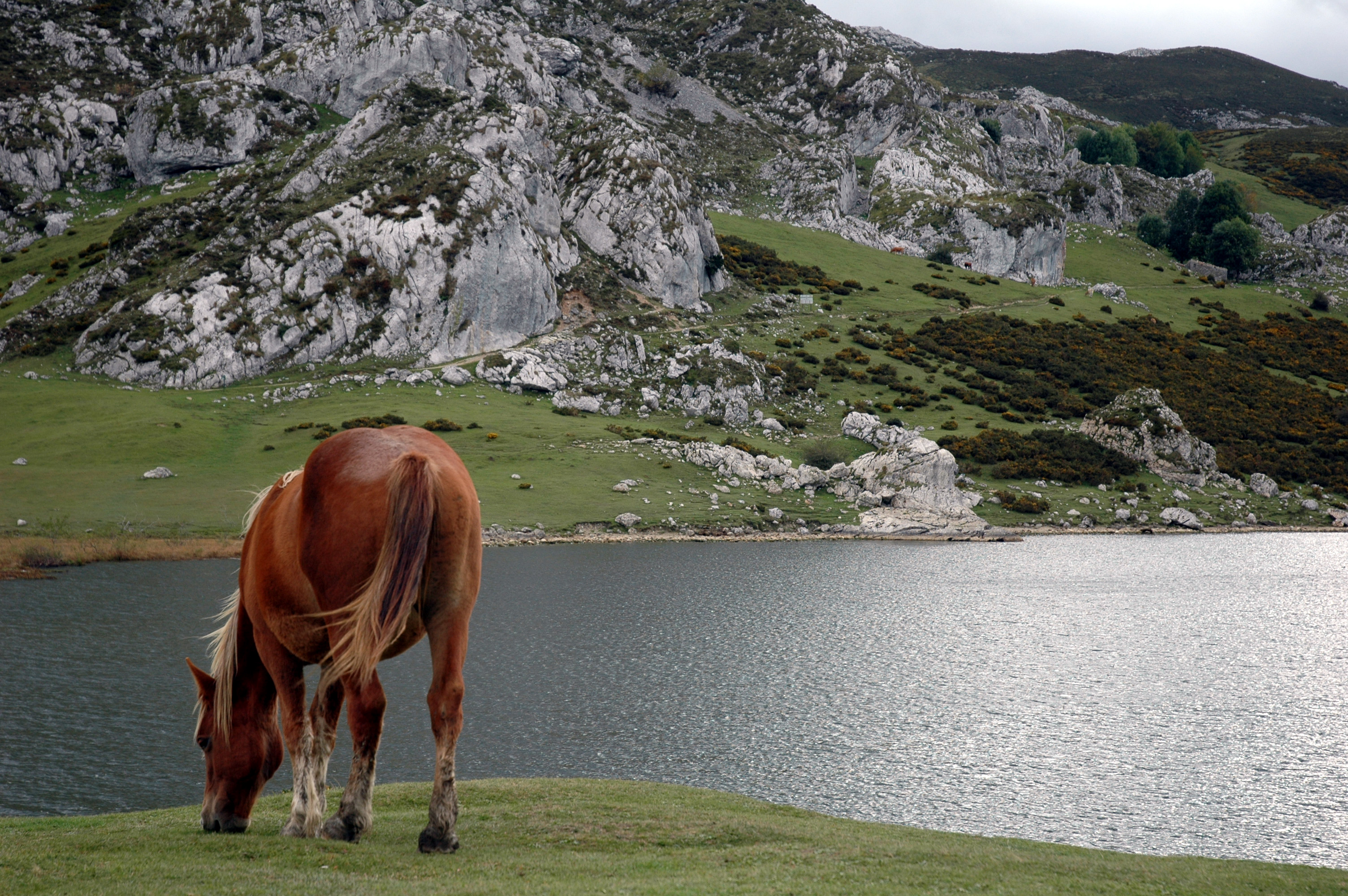
A horse eats grass beside Lake Ercina

== See also ==
- Battle of Covadonga
