= Tower of Llanes =

- Torreón de Llanes (Spanish)
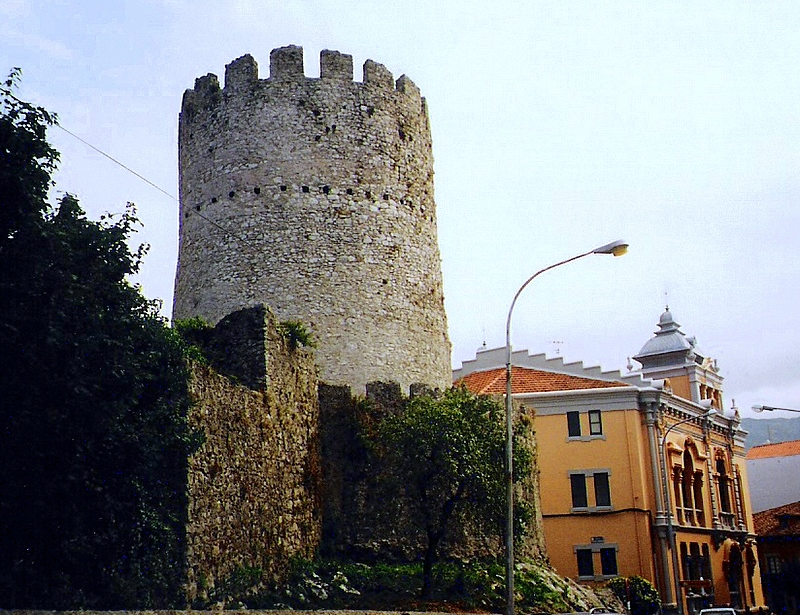

- Location within Spain
- 43.42127°N 4.754983°W
- Location: Llanes, Spain

Spanish Cultural Heritage
- Official name: Torreón de Llanes
- Type: Non-movable
- Criteria: Monument
- Designated: 1876
- Reference no.: RI-51-0000016

The Tower of Llanes (Spanish: Torreón de Llanes) is a medieval tower located in Llanes, Spain.

== Conservation ==
The limestone structure has the heritage listing of Bien de Interés Cultural and has been protected since 1876.

== See also ==
- List of Bien de Interés Cultural in Asturias
