= Royal Collegiate Church of San Fernando =

Royal Collegiate church of San Fernando
- Real Colegiata de San Fernando (Spanish)
- Location within Spain
- 43.307481°N 5.054097°W
- Location: Cangas de Onís, Spain

History
- Built: 1585–1599

Spanish Cultural Heritage
- Official name: Colegiata de Nuestra Señora de Covadonga
- Type: Non-movable
- Criteria: Monument
- Designated: 1884
- Reference no.: RI-51-0000039

The Royal Collegiate church of San Fernando (Spanish: Real Colegiata de San Fernando) is a collegiate church located in the parish of Covadonga, Cangas de Onís, Asturias, Spain. It was declared Bien de Interés Cultural in 1884.

It is the oldest building in the Sanctuary of Covadonga and is located next to the Holy Cave.

== See also ==
- Asturian art
- Basílica de Santa María la Real de Covadonga
- Catholic Church in Spain
- List of Bien de Interés Cultural in Asturias
- Santa Cueva de Covadonga
