= Church of San Martín de Luiña =

Coordinates: 43.5446°N 6.2243°W

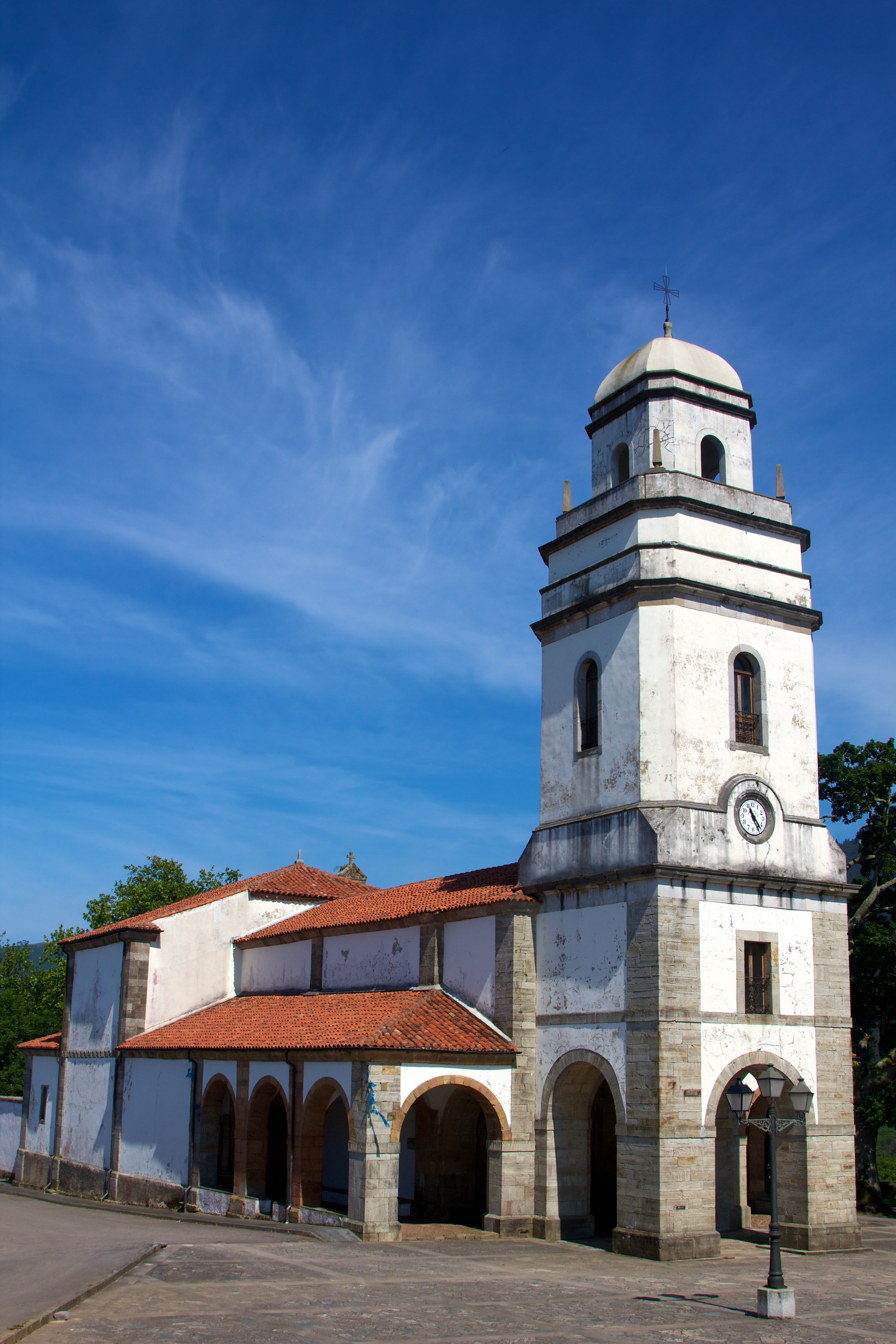
- Church of San Martín de Luiña
- Location: Asturias, Spain

The Church of San Martín de Luiña (Spanish: Iglesia de San Martín de Luiña) is a Baroque-style Roman Catholic parish church located in Escalada in Asturias, Spain. The building, located at the top of the hill, is surrounded by the residential areas of Escalada. The current church, begun in 1718, was completed in 1726, according to the inscription on the lintel of the door. The church was declared Bien de Interés Cultural in 2003.

== Subsequent additions ==
In the first decade of the 19th century, porticoes were built to protect the three church doors at the foot of the nave. The bell tower was erected in mid-century, although the building underwent renovation in the twentieth century. In 1964, the original dome of the tower, severely damaged during the civil war, was replaced by the current roof line.

== Architecture ==
The building has a masonry foundation, with ashlar stone columns in each corner, and has features such as chains, windows, buttresses, pillars, arches, transoms, cornices and ornamental features such as corbels. The exterior walls are plastered and whitewashed. The church has a Latin-cross plan with three naves, flat headers, with lateral vestries and a bell tower at the foot, the headwall appears attached to the former parish cemetery, today a garden. The nave and transept have a vaulted ceiling, the apse has a slightly pointed barrel vault ceiling and the central section of the hemispherical dome has scalloped decorations.

The main western entrance has rosette ornamentations and is framed by two fluted pilasters supporting a plain entablature which rests on pedestals decorated with acanthus leaves. The other two lintels are of the same classic design which inspired the western front. The surrounding arcades to the north have lost the tip of the smooth shaft columns on pedestals flanking the cross and crown brackets. The southern end is made up of raised segments with raised padded, bracketed by the remains of a braided columella. It is also trimmed with separate columns along the remainder of the left side, topped with a capital of acanthus leaves. A decorative fascia runs along the lintel, a classical entablature, alternating corrugated eight-petalled rosettes. This fascia also travels outside the transepts and chancel. The vaulted roof, resting on pillars, is topped with fluted fascia capitals. The porch floor is decorated with curlicues. The tower of the church, almost 27 meters high at the western end of the portico is divided into three sections: entrance porch, bell tower and level landing, upon which stands a pavilion topped by an octagonal chamfered cupola.

Many of the same decorative motifs appear on the inside as on the exterior fascia; the pilasters of the arcs have the same capitals, and grooved fascia board frames. On the walls of the chapel also appears a ledge, beautifully decorated. The walls are painted to imitate stones. In the pavement are preserved inscriptions concerning the graves surrounding the altar; on the epistle side is inscribed "Graves of nobles and commoners" and on the gospel side "Graves of nobles married and unmarried children." Vaqueiros were placed in the nave. ("The 'baqueros' (sic) will no more move from here in order to hear Mass" and "Graves for 'baqueros' (sic) and strangers").

The altarpiece and the two side pieces are three restored examples of Baroque art, made in the first half of the 18th century, and attributed to Gabriel Antonio Fernández "Tonin". The altarpiece is dedicated to San Martin, the left side to the Virgen del Rosario and the right side to the Virgen de los Dolores. The original images were burned during the Spanish Civil War. Inside the sacristy is preserved a window arch, corresponding to a window blind, now reopened, which is formed by a molding and adorned with rosettes and topped with three large pinnacles.
