= Church of Santa María de Llas =

Coordinates: 43°18′22″N 4°49′00″W

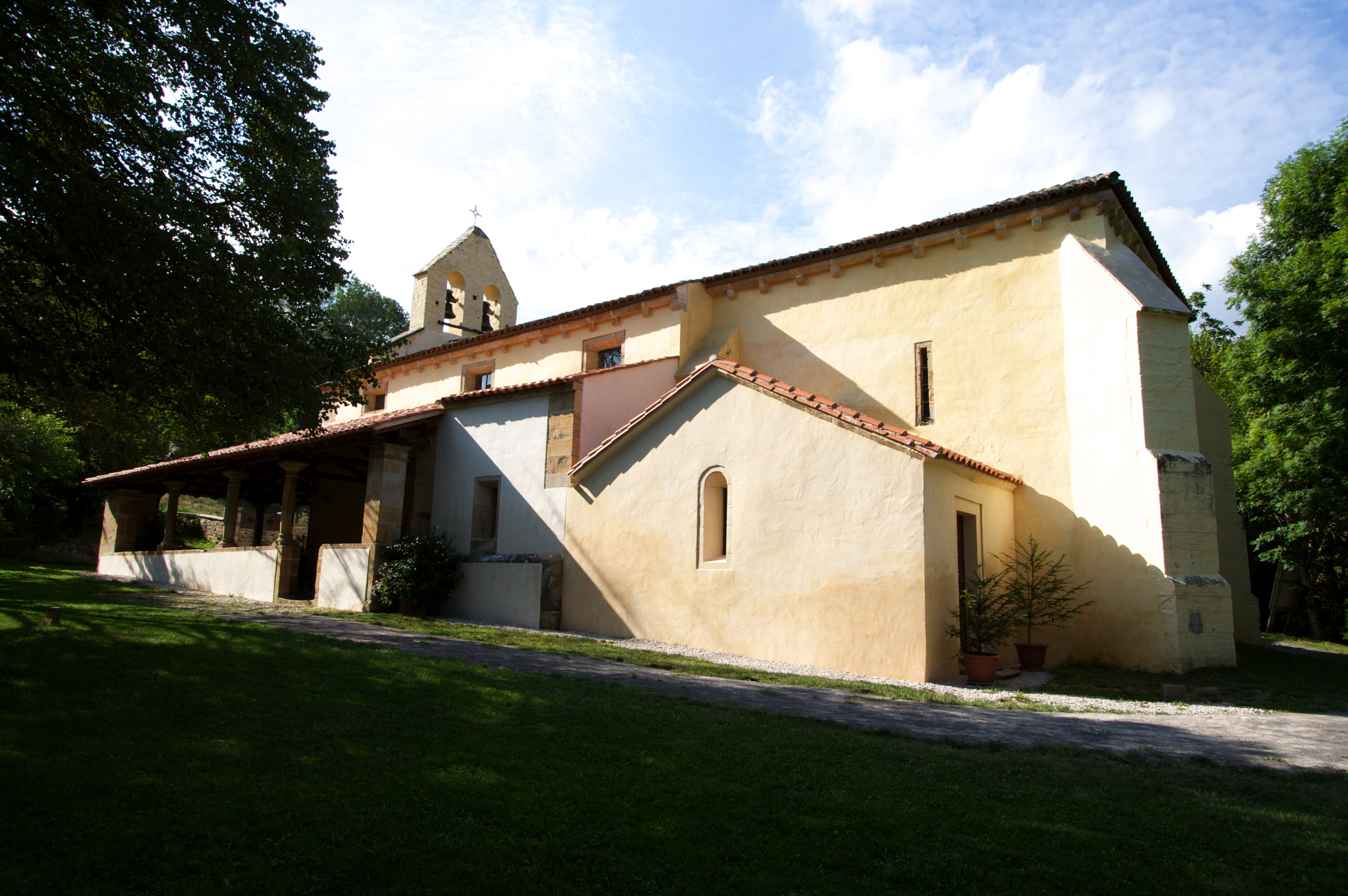
- Church of Santa María de Llas
- Location: Asturias, Spain

The Church of Santa María de Llas (Spanish: Iglesia de Santa María de Llas) is a Roman Catholic church in the Las Arenas parish of the municipality of Cabrales, in the autonomous community of Asturias, Spain. It is considered a historical monument.

The church is built in the Asturian Gothic style, yet retains a Romanesque main portal.
