= Church of Santa María de Sabada =

Coordinates: 43.5152°N 5.2722°W

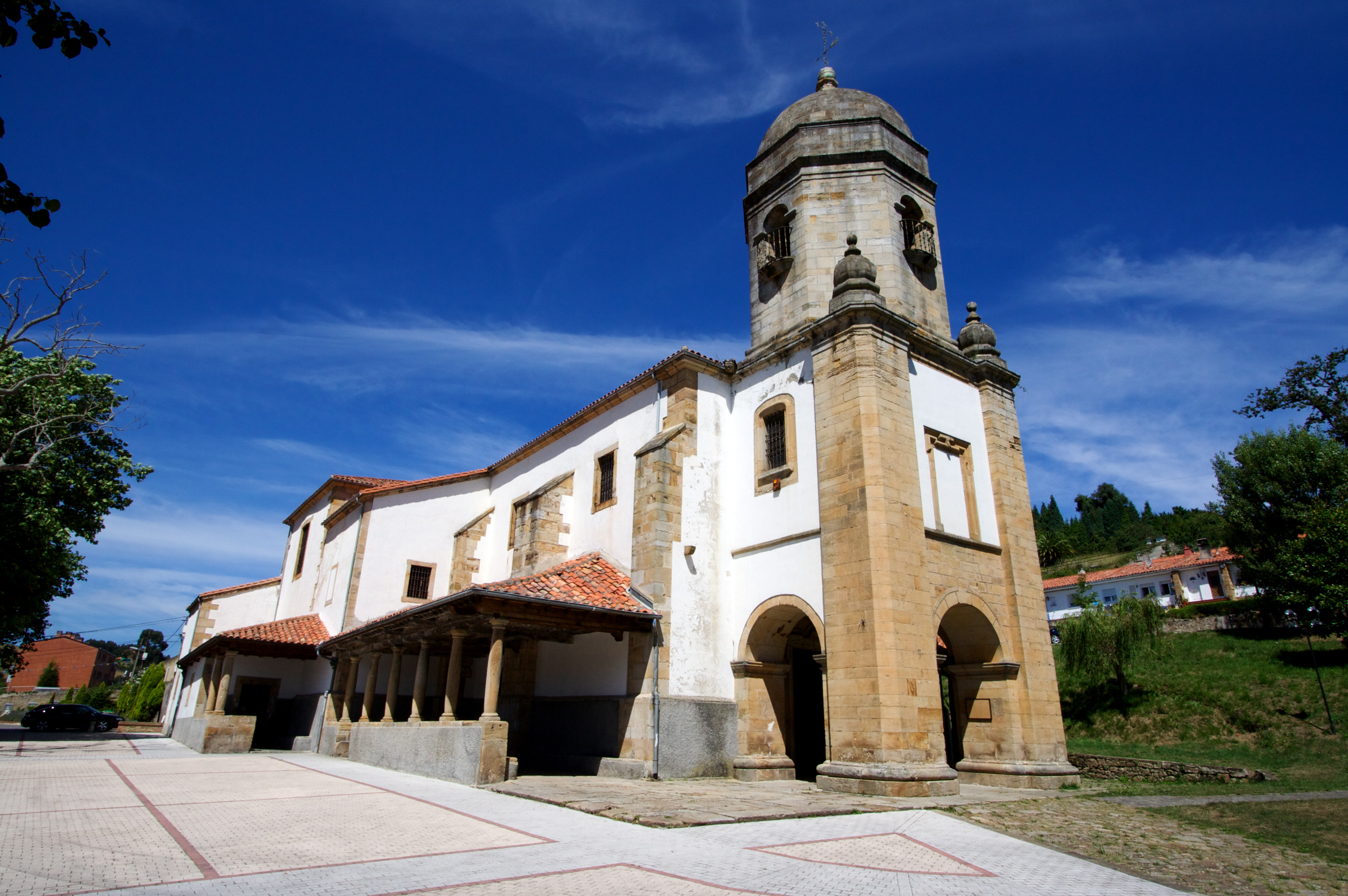
- Church of Santa María de Sabada
- Location: Asturias, Spain

The Church of Santa María de Sabada (Spanish: Iglesia de Santa María de Sabada) is a Roman Catholic church in the municipality of Llastres, Asturias, Spain. The church was designed by Asturian architects Manuel Reguera and Joaquín Vigil and built in 1757.
