= Iglesia de Santa Cecilia (Careñes) =

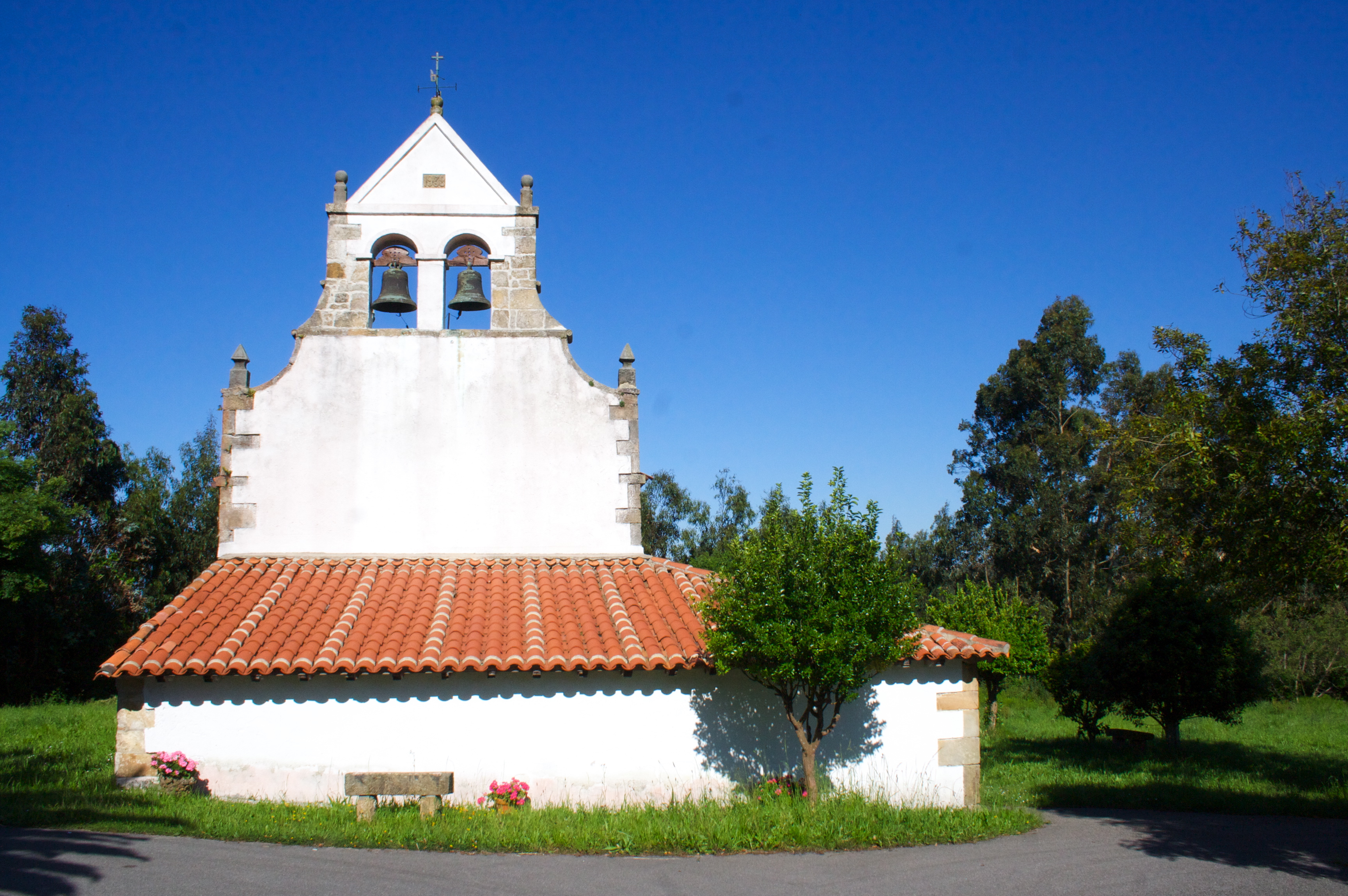
- Iglesia de Santa Cecilia (Careñes)
- 43.54437°N 5.49958°W
- Location: Asturias, Spain

Iglesia de Santa Cecilia (Careñes) is a church in Asturias, Spain.
