= Santo Domingo, Oviedo =

Coordinates: 43°21′31″N 5°50′30″W

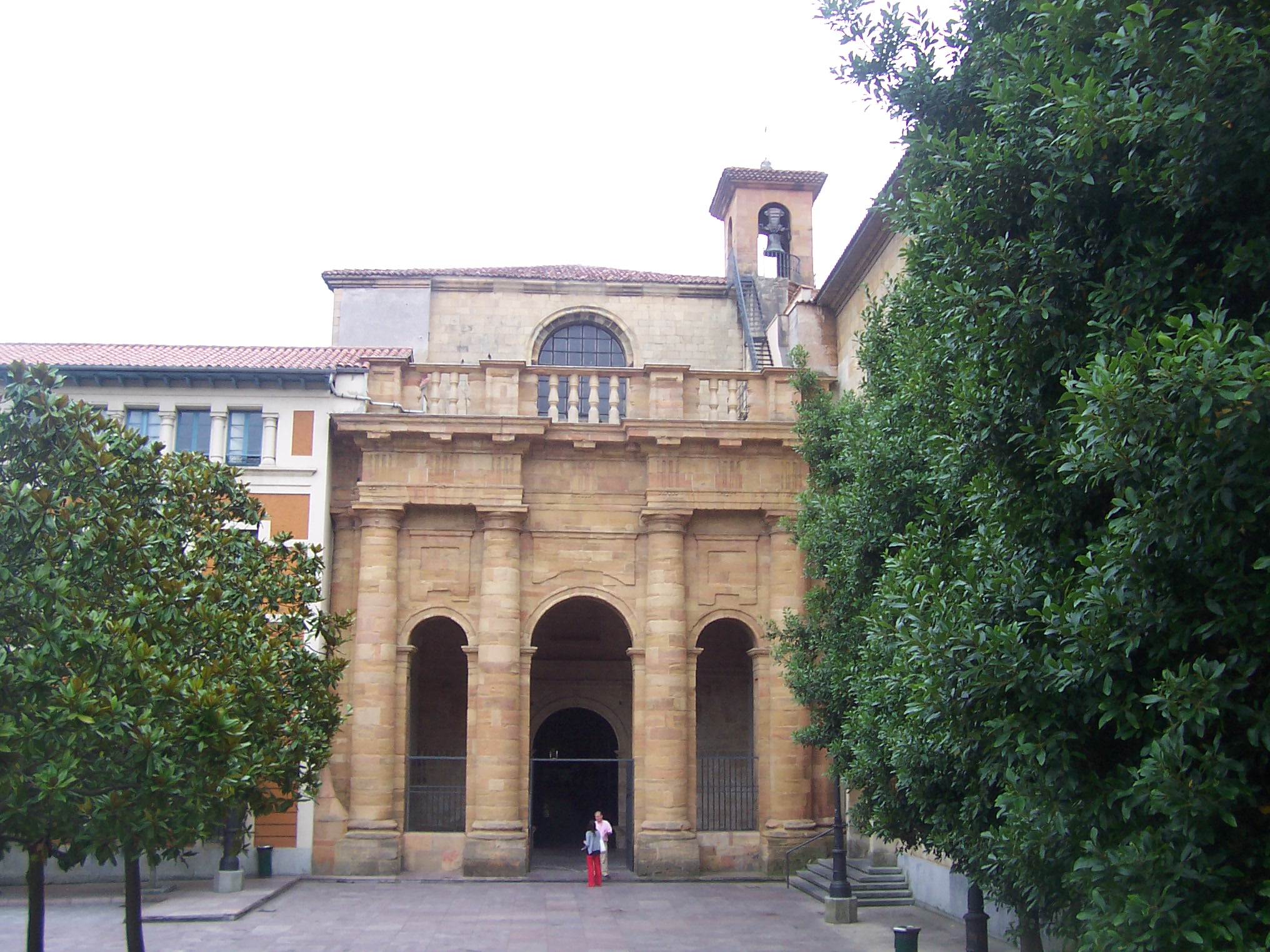
- Santo Domingo, Oviedo
- Location: Oviedo, Asturias, Spain

Iglesia de Santo Domingo is a church in Oviedo, region of Asturias, Spain. It was established in 1518.

== See also ==
- Asturian art
- Catholic Church in Spain
