= Iglesia de Santa María del Conceyu (Llanes) =

Coordinates: 43°25′17″N 4°45′14″W

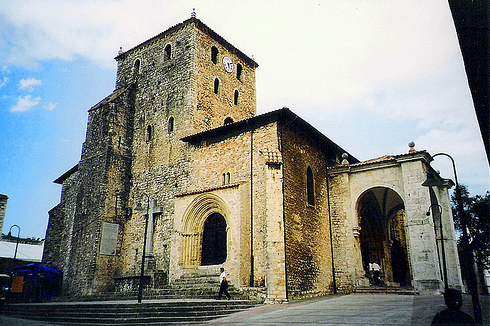
- Iglesia de Santa María del Conceyu (Llanes)
- Location: Asturias, Spain

Iglesia de Santa María del Conceyu (Llanes) is a church in Llanes, Asturias, Spain.

== See also ==
- Asturian art
- Catholic Church in Spain
