= Church of Santa María de Celón =

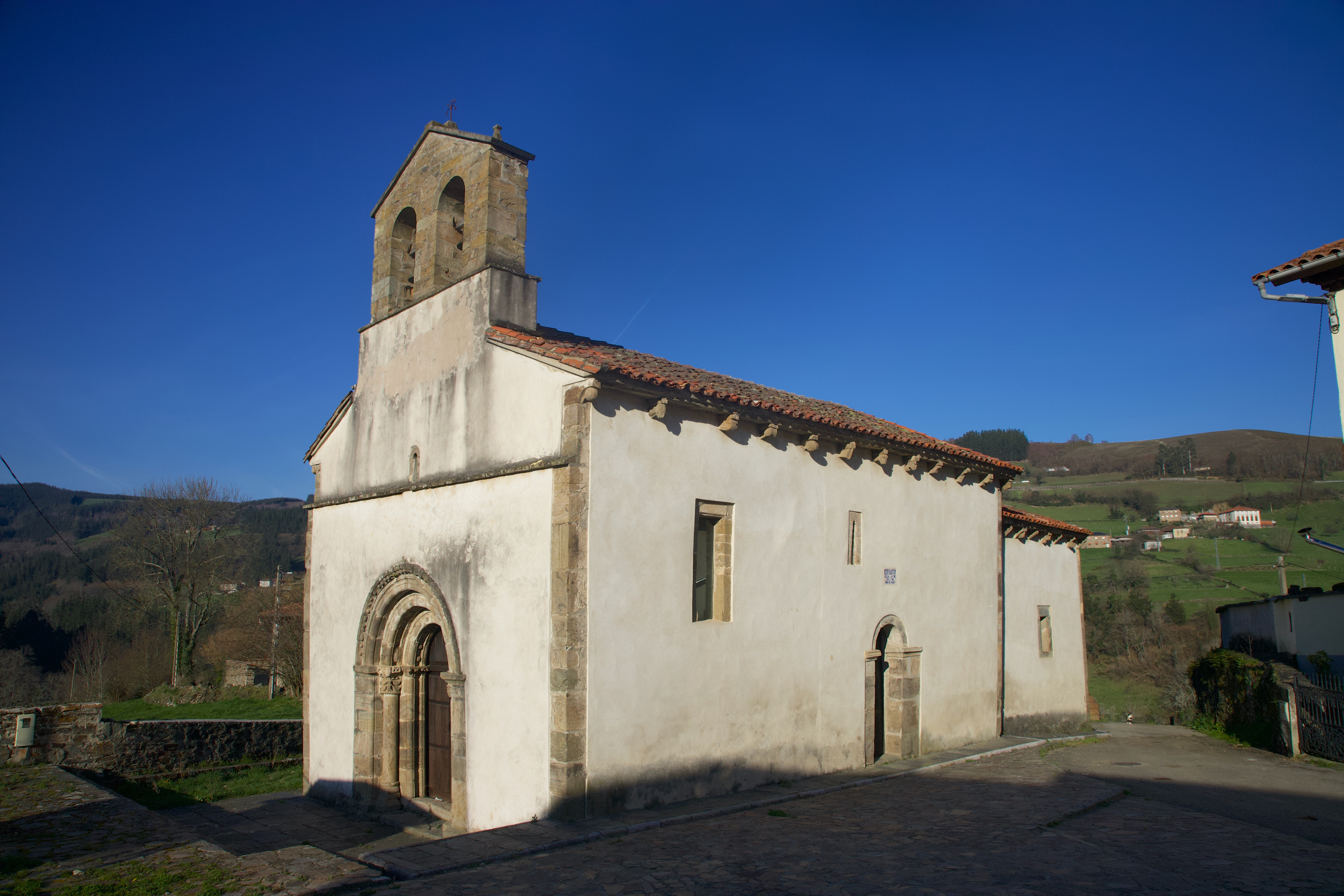

- Location within Spain
- 43°14′27″N 6°34′56″W
- Location: Asturias, Spain

The Church of Santa María de Celón (Spanish: Iglesia de Santa María de Celón is a Romanesque-style, Roman Catholic parish church in the diocese of Celón in the municipality of Allande, community of Asturias, Spain.
