= Palace of la Espriella en Villahormes =

- Palacio de la Espriella en Villahormes (Spanish)
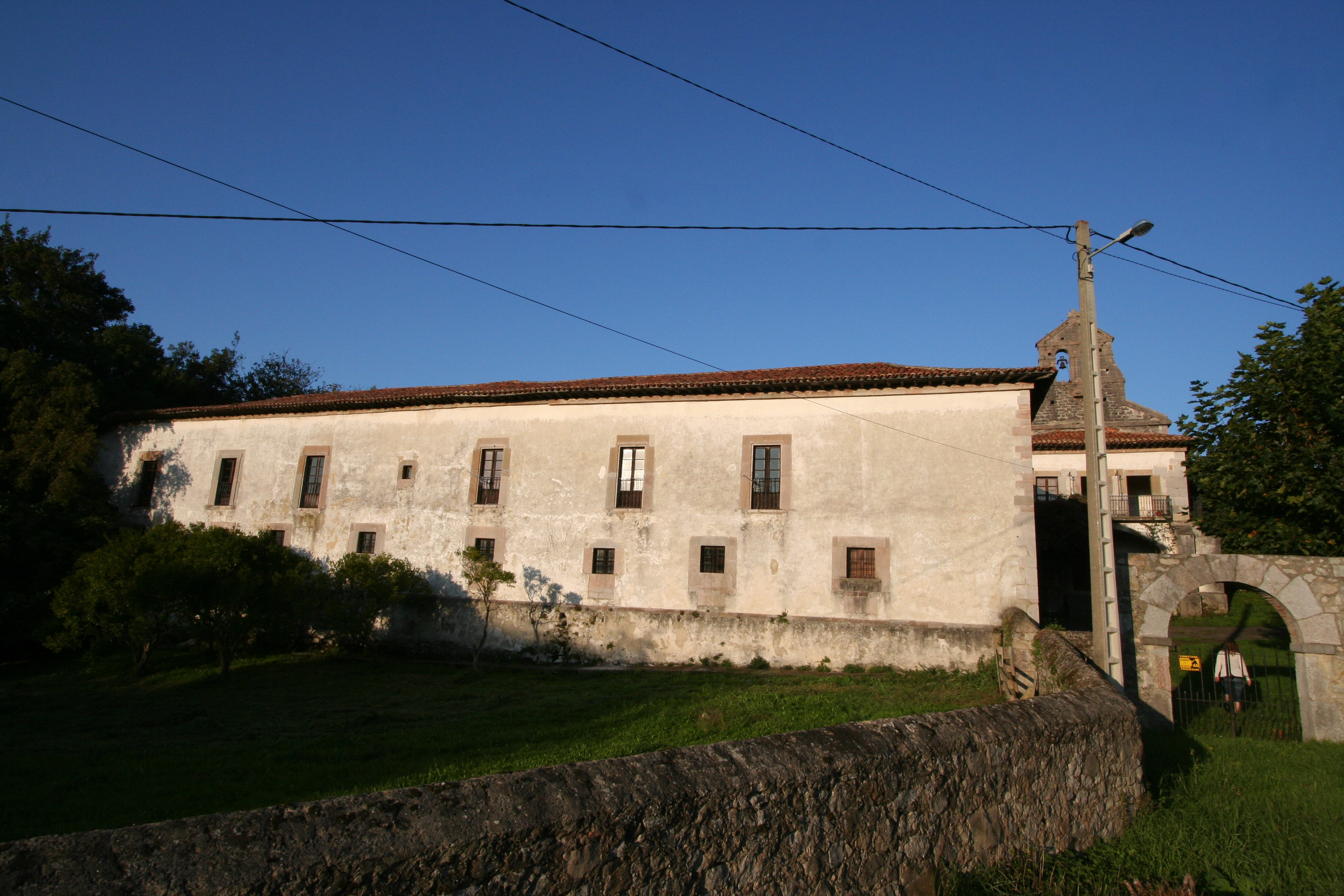

- Location within Spain
- 43.444561°N 4.902595°W
- Location: Llanes, Spain

History
- Built: XVII century

Spanish Cultural Heritage
- Official name: Palacio de la Espriella en Villahormes
- Type: Non-movable
- Criteria: Monument
- Designated: 1985
- Reference no.: RI-51-0005075

The Palace of la Espriella en Villahormes (Spanish: Palacio de la Espriella en Villahormes) is a palace located in Llanes, Spain. It was declared Bien de Interés Cultural in 1985.

The Palacio de la Espriella is a Spanish rural palace located in the neighborhood of Villahormes, in the parish of Hontoria, in the council Asturian of Llanes.

It is a 17th-century palace begun in 1616 for the noble Llanes de Espriella who was in Palermo at that time.

Two remodels are carried out in the palace, the first in the 18th century and the second and definitive in XIX.

This rural palace has a rectangular layout with a central patio. Built in limestone with lime highlights the nobiliary shield located at the front door. The building consists of two floors, the floor intended for the daily activity of the house with the stables, cellars and llagar and the upper floor for the family that owns it. On this floor are the rooms, main bedrooms and the office. In an extension, which gives it its rectangular shape, is located the kitchen, the ovens and the dining room. In a wing of the upper part are the rooms dedicated to the servants.

In the palace, the Marqués consorte de Argüelles, Federico Bernaldo de Quirós y Mier, married to María Josefa Argüelles Díaz was born.
