= Iglesia de San Emeterio (Sietes) =

Catholic church in Asturias, Spain

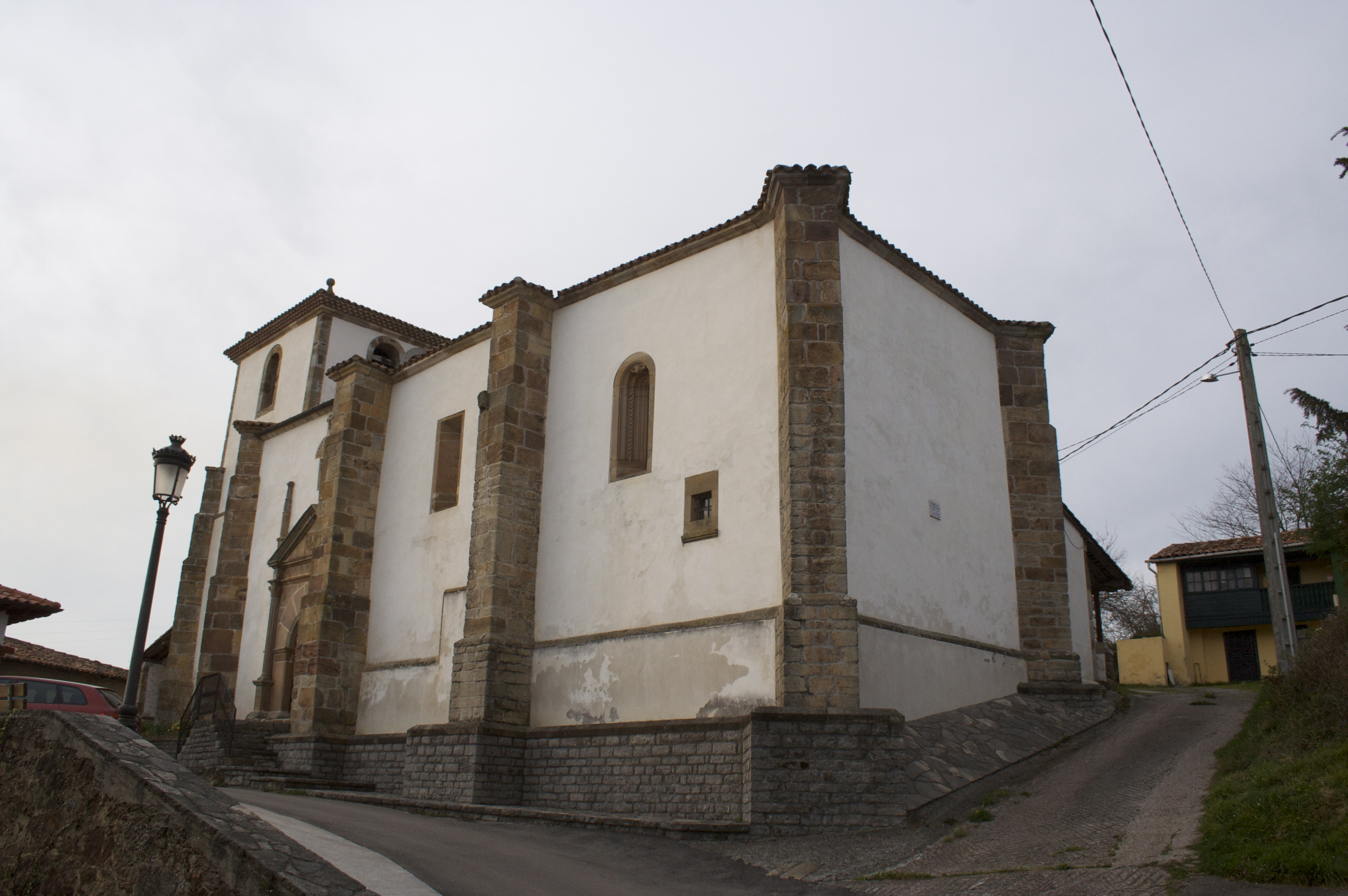
- Iglesia de San Emeterio (Sietes)
- 43.43213°N 5.36759°W
- Location: Asturias, Spain

San Emeterio is a Roman Catholic church in the neighborhood of Sietes in the autonomous community of Asturias, Spain. It was established in the mid 16th century.

== See also ==
- Asturian art
- Catholic Church in Spain
