= Santa Cueva de Covadonga =

Cave in Asturias, Spain

Coordinates: 43.3089°N 5.0564°W

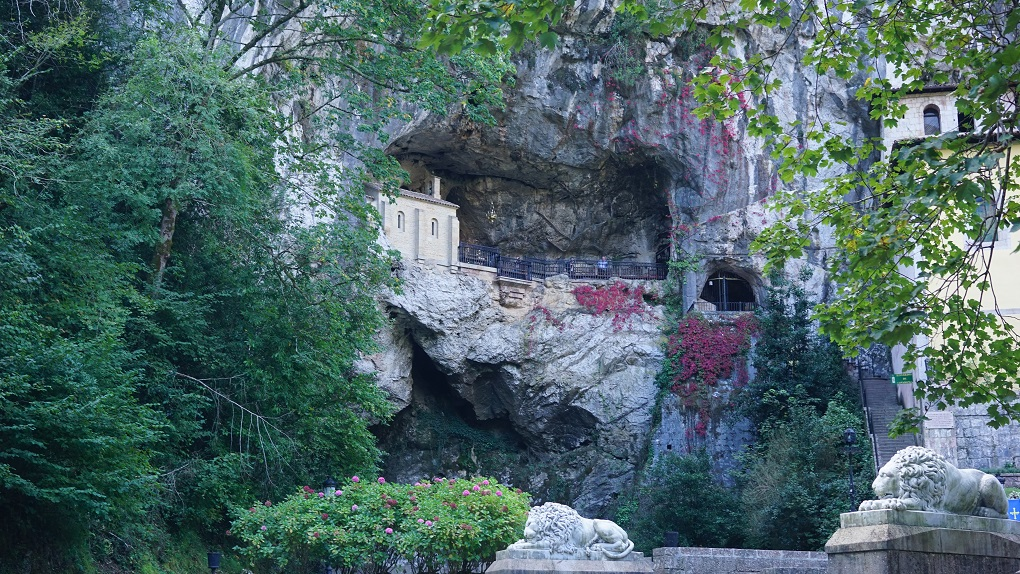
The Holy Cave of Covadonga

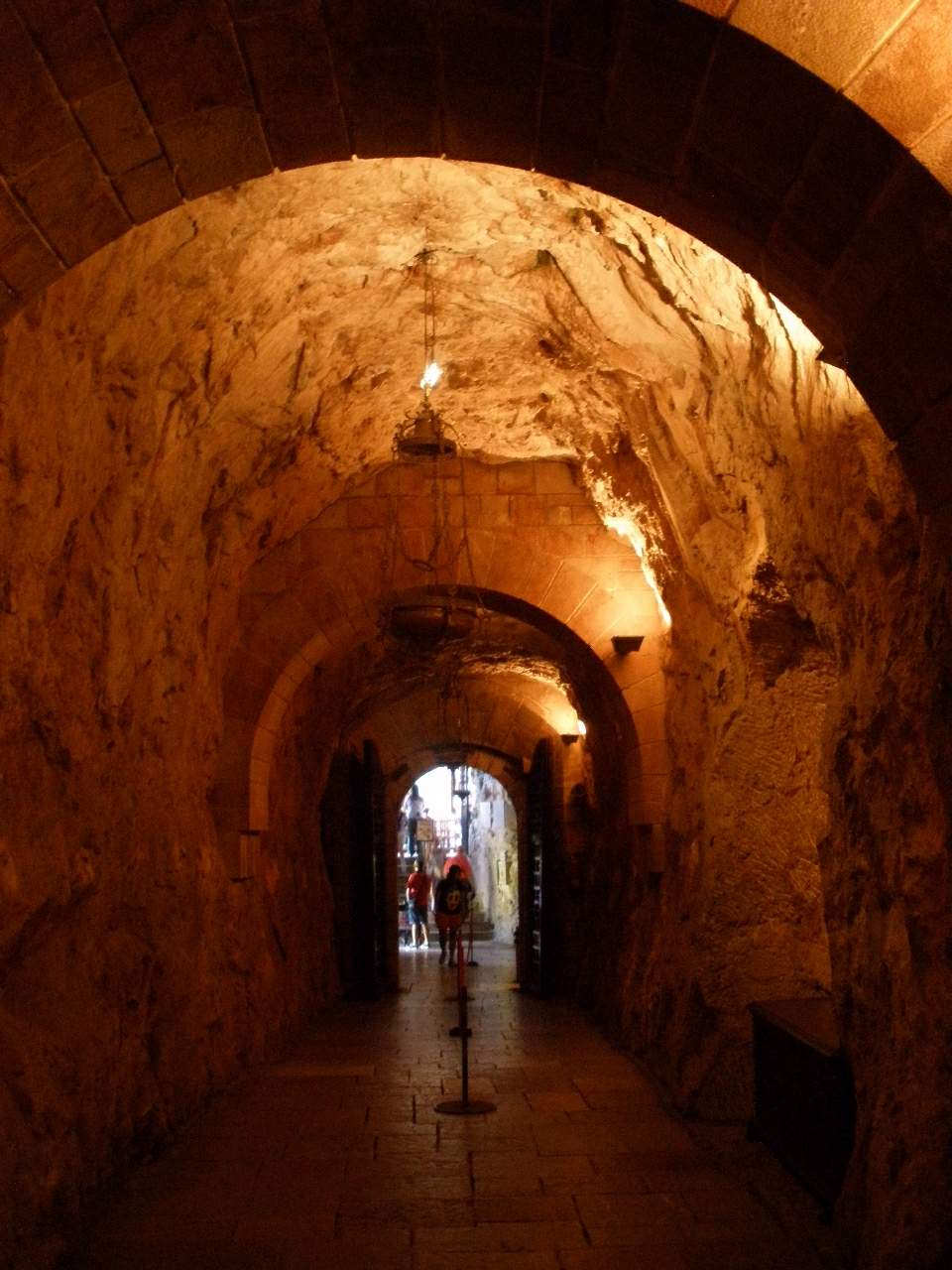
Interior of the cave

The Santa Cueva de Covadonga ("Holy Cave of Covadonga") is a Catholic sanctuary located in Asturias, northern Spain. It is a cave in the Picos de Europa mountains, which gives its name to the parish of Covadonga in the municipality of Cangas de Onís. The name refers to the sanctuary, dedicated to the Virgin of Covadonga, where the first battle of the Reconquista took place in 718.

== Description and history ==
The origin of the cave as a cult site is controversial. The Christian tradition has it that Pelagius, chasing a criminal who had taken refuge in the cave, met a hermit who was venerating the Virgin Mary. The hermit asked Pelagius to forgive the criminal, since the criminal had resorted to the protection of the Virgin, and said that one day he too would need to seek shelter in the cave.

Muslim chronicles about the Battle of Covadonga say that Pelagius's forces fled to this cave, feeding on honey bees left in the crevices of the rock. Christian chronicles claim that the miraculous intervention of the Virgin Mary was crucial in the victory, repelling attacks against the cave.

The first construction in the Holy Cave dates back to the reign of Alfonso I of Asturias, who, to commemorate Pelagius's victory over the Muslims, built a chapel dedicated to the Virgin Mary. This would give rise to the invocation of the Our Lady of Covadonga (popularly known as La Santina). In addition to the altar dedicated to the Virgin, two others were built for Saint John the Baptist and Saint Andrew. Alfonso presented this church to the Benedictine monks.

The cave was covered with wood, and in 1777 a fire destroyed the medieval Marian statue; the current wooden image of Virgin and Child dates to the 16th century and was donated to the sanctuary by the Cathedral of Oviedo in 1778.

In 1872 Benito Sanz y Forés travelled to the cave and promoted its renovation; in 1874 he laid the first stone of the chapel dedicated to the Virgin inside the Cave and opened the chapel to the worship of the faithful during the September festivals.

During the civil war the Virgin image disappeared and was found in the Embassy of Spain in France in 1939. The present chapel of Romanesque style is the work of Luis Menéndez-Pidal and Alvarez.

== Royal pantheon of Covadonga ==
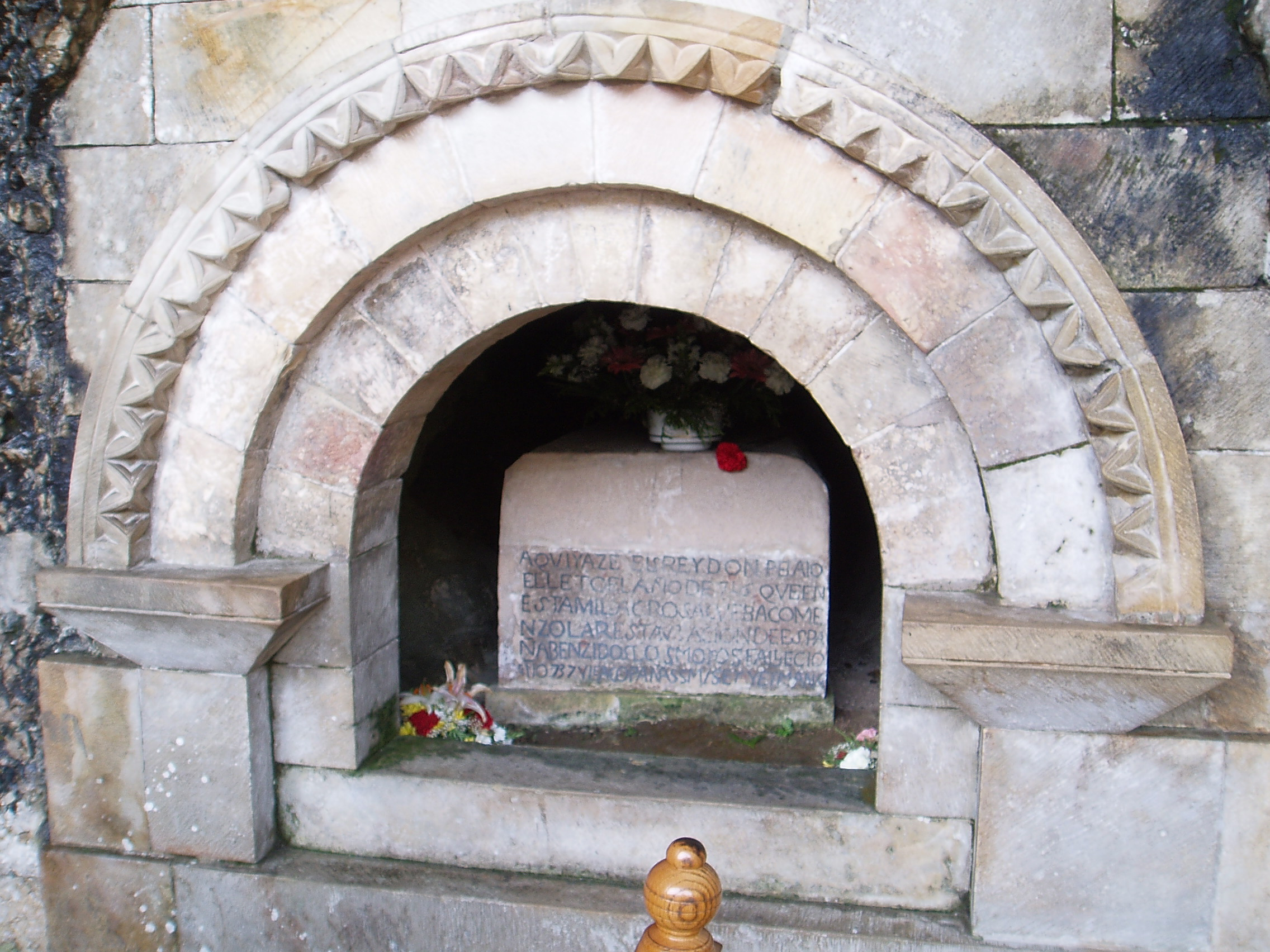
Tomb of Pelagius

The shrine of Covadonga was very important for the Kingdom of Asturias. Members of the royal family buried in the Pantéon Real de Covadonga ("Royal Pantheon (or Mausoleum) of Covadonga"), were the following:

- Pelagius of Asturias (died 737), first king of Asturias.
- Queen Gaudiosa, Pelagius's wife.
- A sister of King Pelagius.
- Alfonso I of Asturias (693-757), third king of Asturias.
- Queen Ermesinda, Alfonso I's wife.

Pelagius died in Cangas de Onís, where he had his court in 737. After his death, his body was buried in the Church of Santa Eulalia of Abamia, located in the Asturian town of Abamia, where his wife had been also previously buried. The chronicler Ambrosio Morales noted in his work that Alfonso X of Castile ordered the removal of Pelagius and his wife's to the Holy Cave of Covadonga.

== See also ==
- Cueva de Achbinico
- Marian apparition
- Royal Collegiate church of San Fernando
