= Iglesia de Santa Marina (Puerto de Vega) =

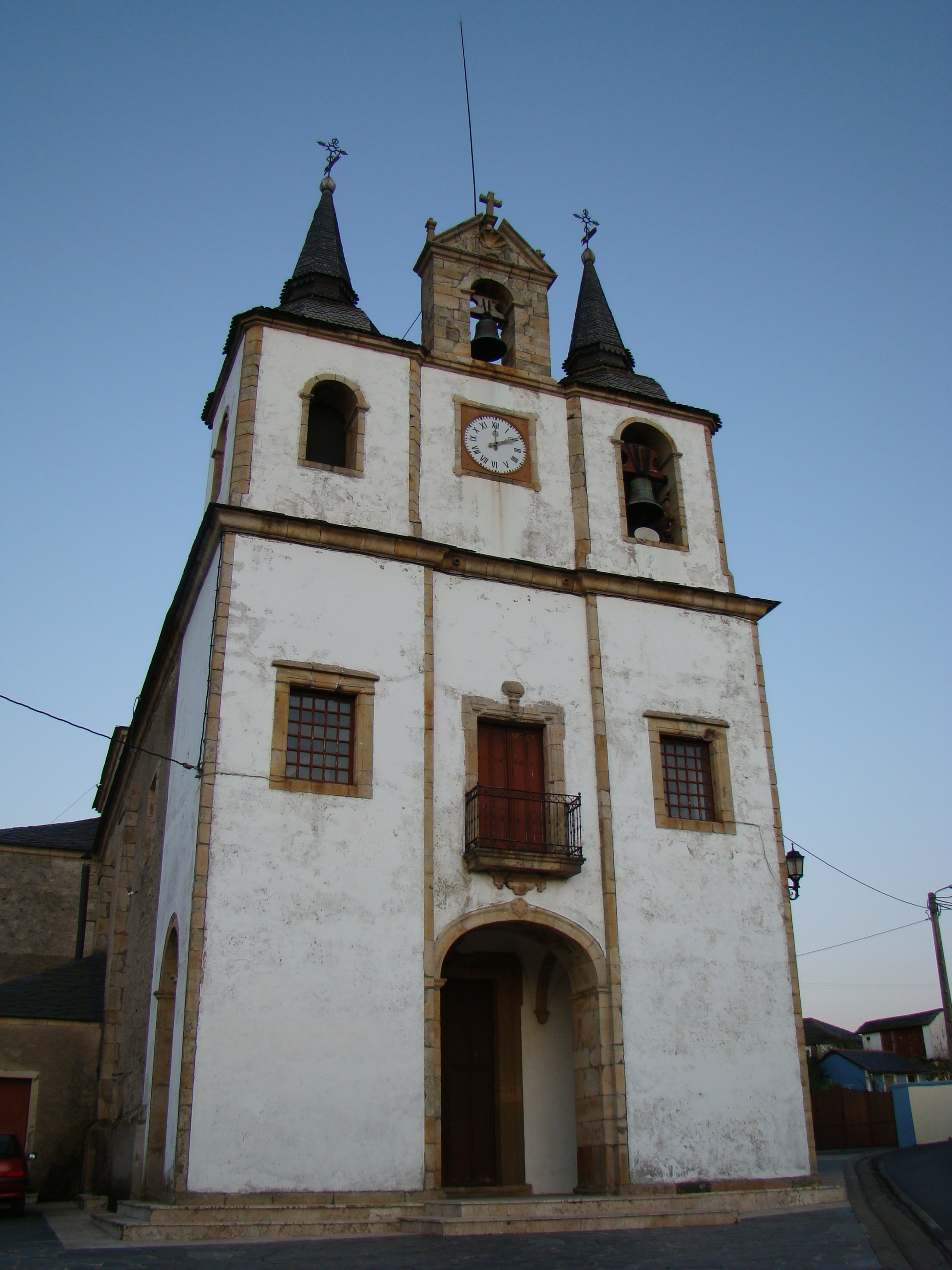
- Iglesia de Santa Marina (Puerto de Vega)
- 43.562705°N 6.64149°W
- Location: Asturias, Spain

Iglesia de Santa Marina (Puerto de Vega) is a church in Asturias, Spain.
