= Gobiendes Palace =

Coordinates: 43.4666°N 5.2311°W

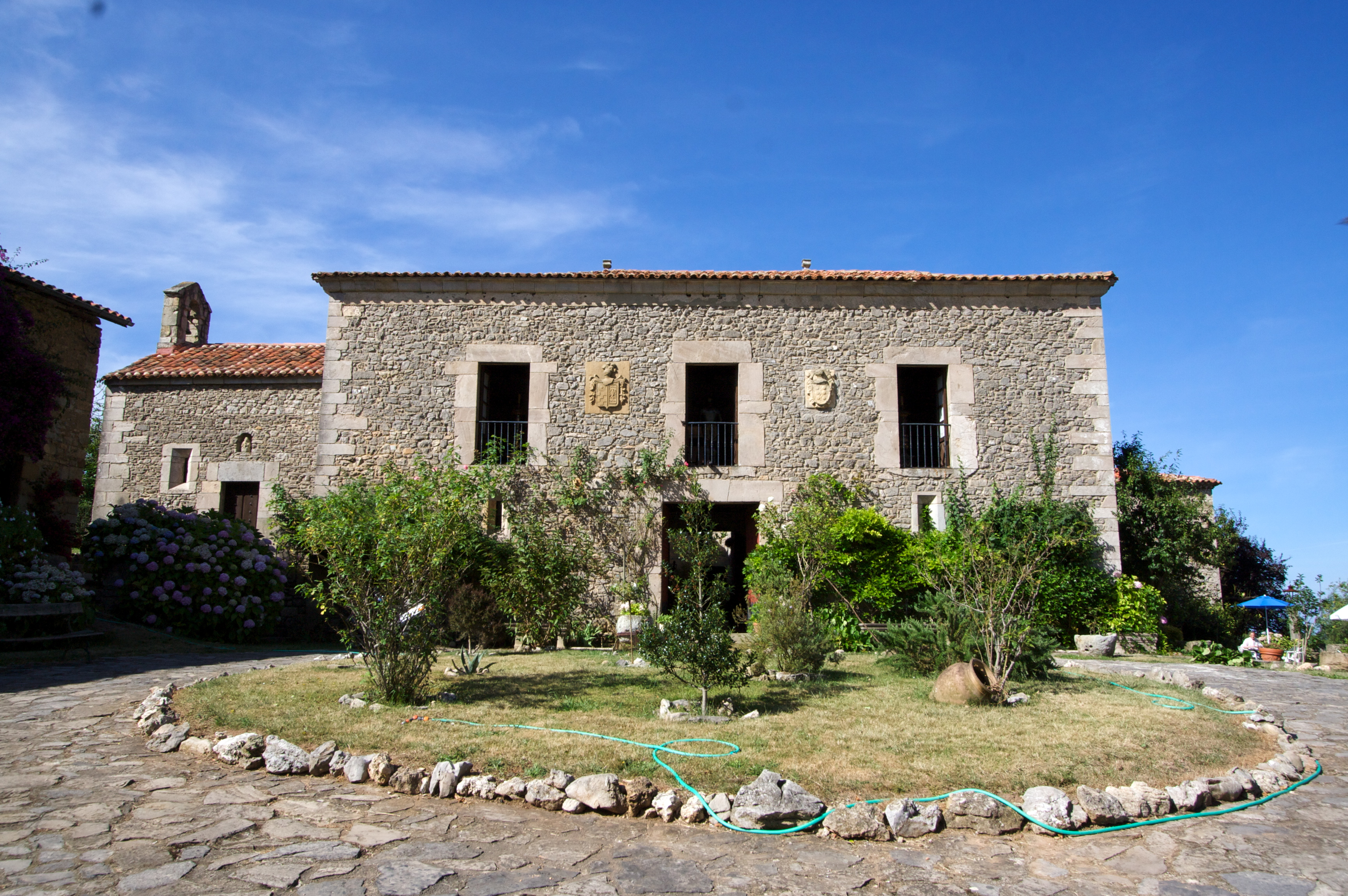
Gobiendes Palace

The Gobiendes Palace (Palacio de Gobiendes) is a palace located in the municipality of Colunga, Asturias, Spain. It was built with a medieval tower in the 15th century, and belonged to the Mitra Ovetense until the time of Philip II, who sold it to Gonzalo Ruiz de Junco. The building was later extended, and today it has two perpendicular wings, with a side chapel.
