= Colegiata de Santa María la Mayor (Salas) =

Coordinates: 43.4087°N 6.2606°W

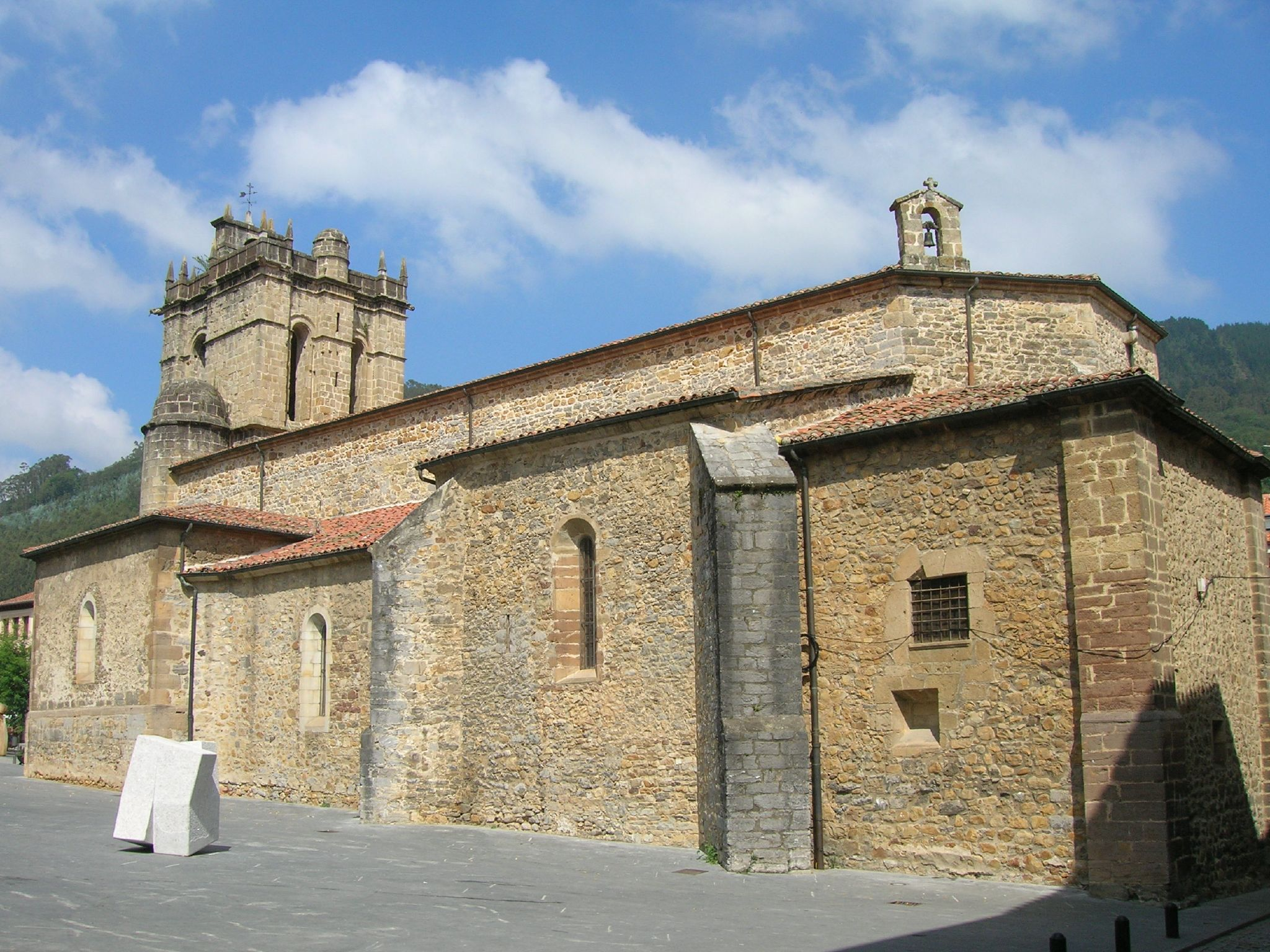
- Colegiata de Santa María la Mayor (Salas)
- Location: Asturias, Spain

Colegiata de Santa María la Mayor (Salas) is a church in Asturias, Spain. The church was established in the 16th century. It contains a mausoleum.

Fernando de Valdés y Salas is buried here.

== See also ==
- Asturian art
- Catholic Church in Spain
