= Mayorazgo Palace =

Coordinates: 43°18′33″N 4°51′57″W

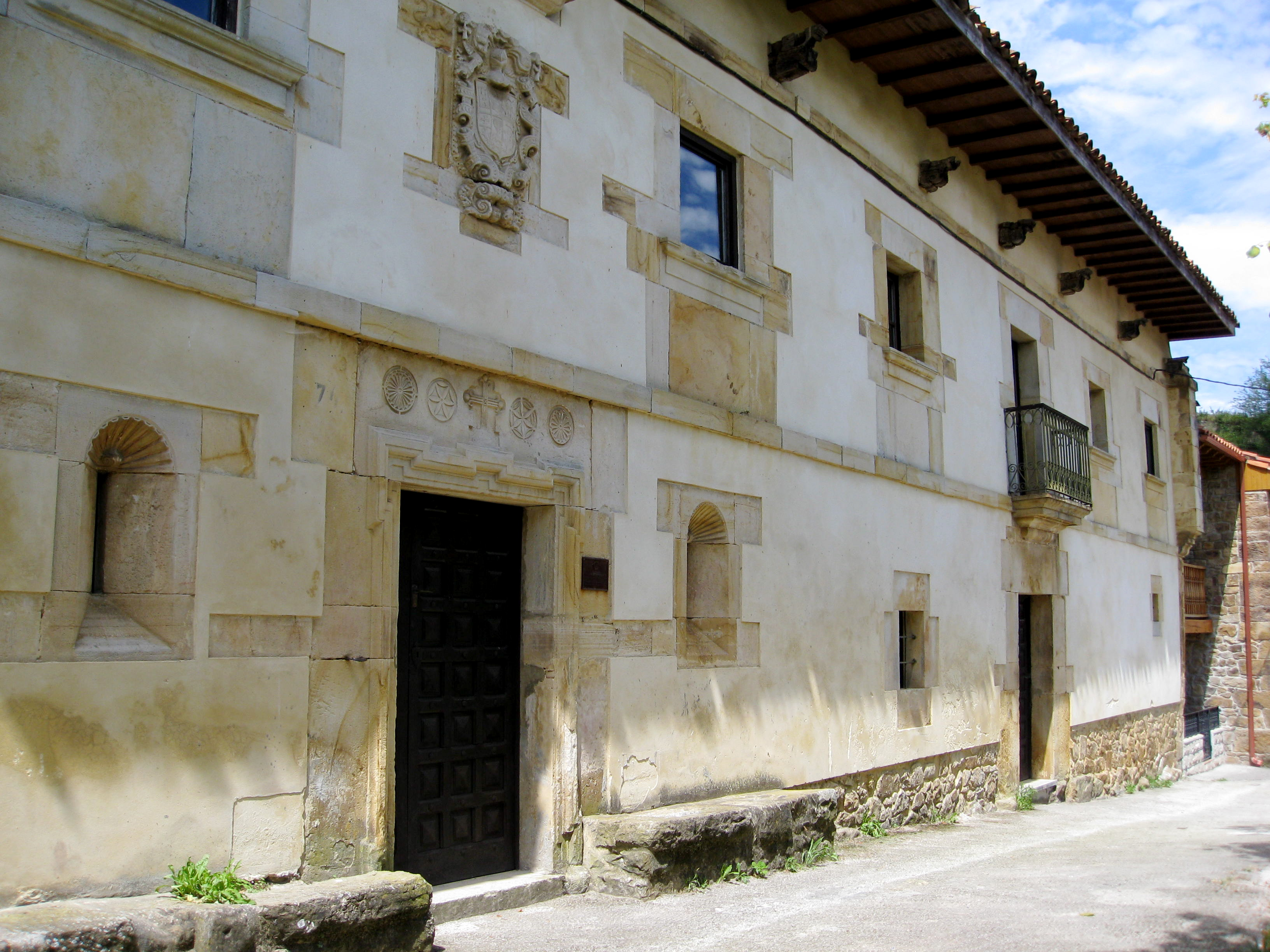
Mayorazgo Palace

Mayorazgo Palace (Palacio del Mayorazgo) is a rural palace in Inguanzo, Cabrales, Asturias, Spain, built in the 17th and 18th centuries. It has two stories and a compact rectangular floor plan; it lacks an interior patio. Two arrowslits flank the door on the front façade. This front door is surrounded by molding and topped by a stone with decorative carvings. Above the door is a large decorative shield.
