= Monasterio de San Martín de Salas =

Monastery in Salas, Spain

Coordinates: 43°24′31″N 6°15′38″W

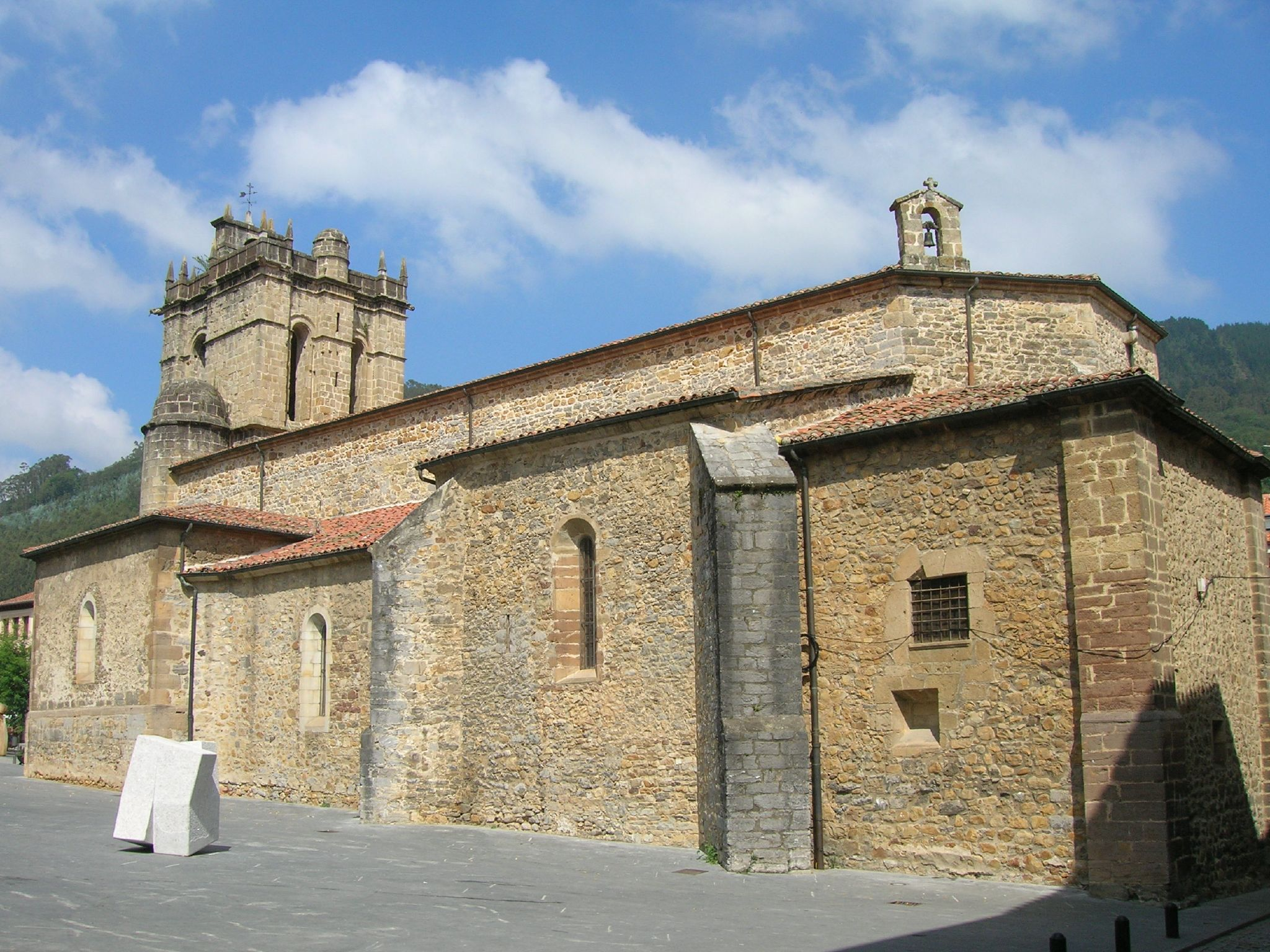
Monasterio de San Martín de Salas

Monasterio de San Martín de Salas is a monastery in Asturias, Spain.
