= Iglesia de San Vicente (Serrapio) =

Coordinates: 43.1670°N 5.6343°W

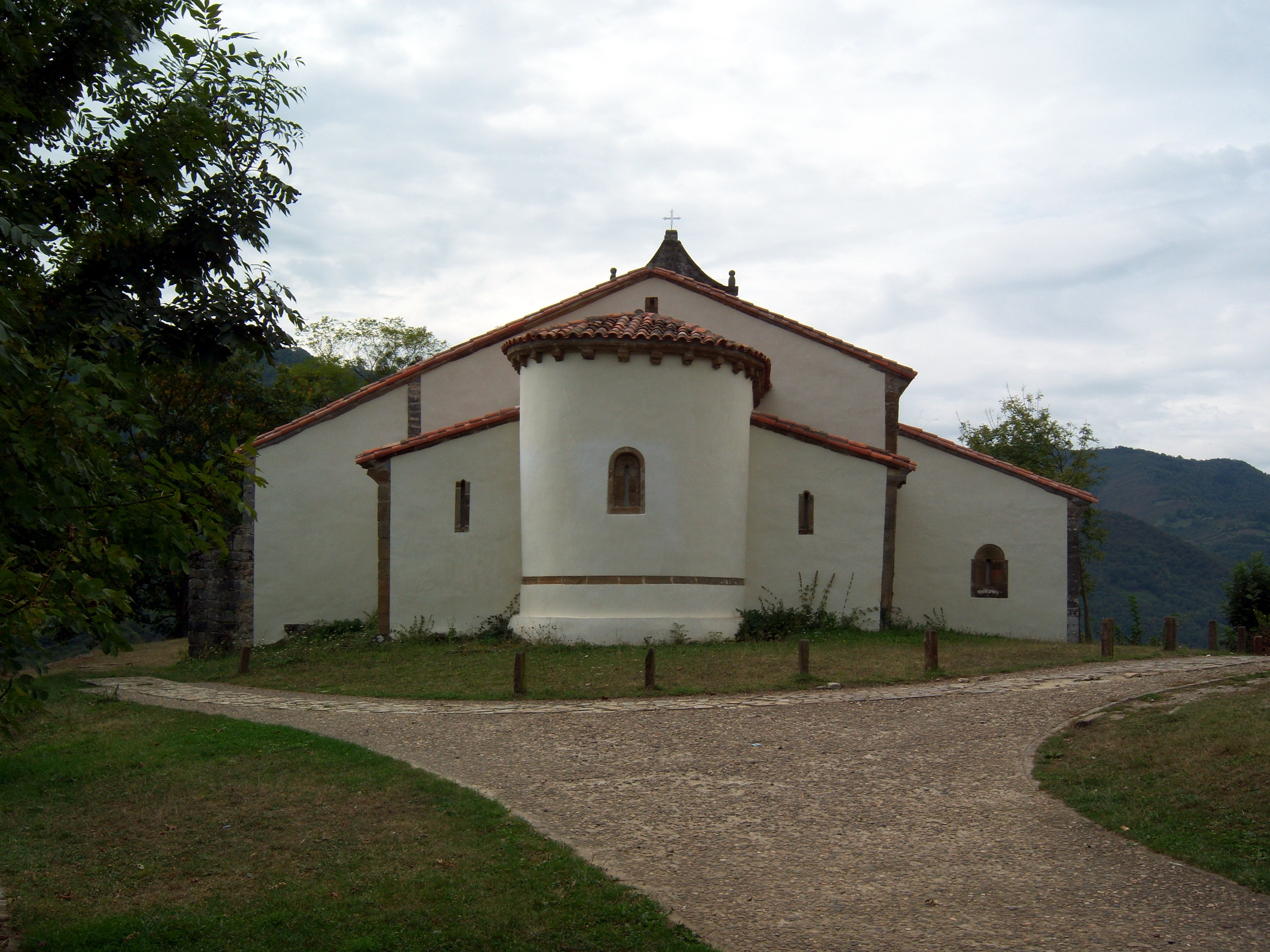
- Iglesia de San Vicente (Serrapio)
- Location: Asturias, Spain

Iglesia de San Vicente (Serrapio) is a church in Asturias, Spain.
