= Colegiata de San Pedro de Teverga =

Coordinates: 43°09′28″N 6°06′16″W

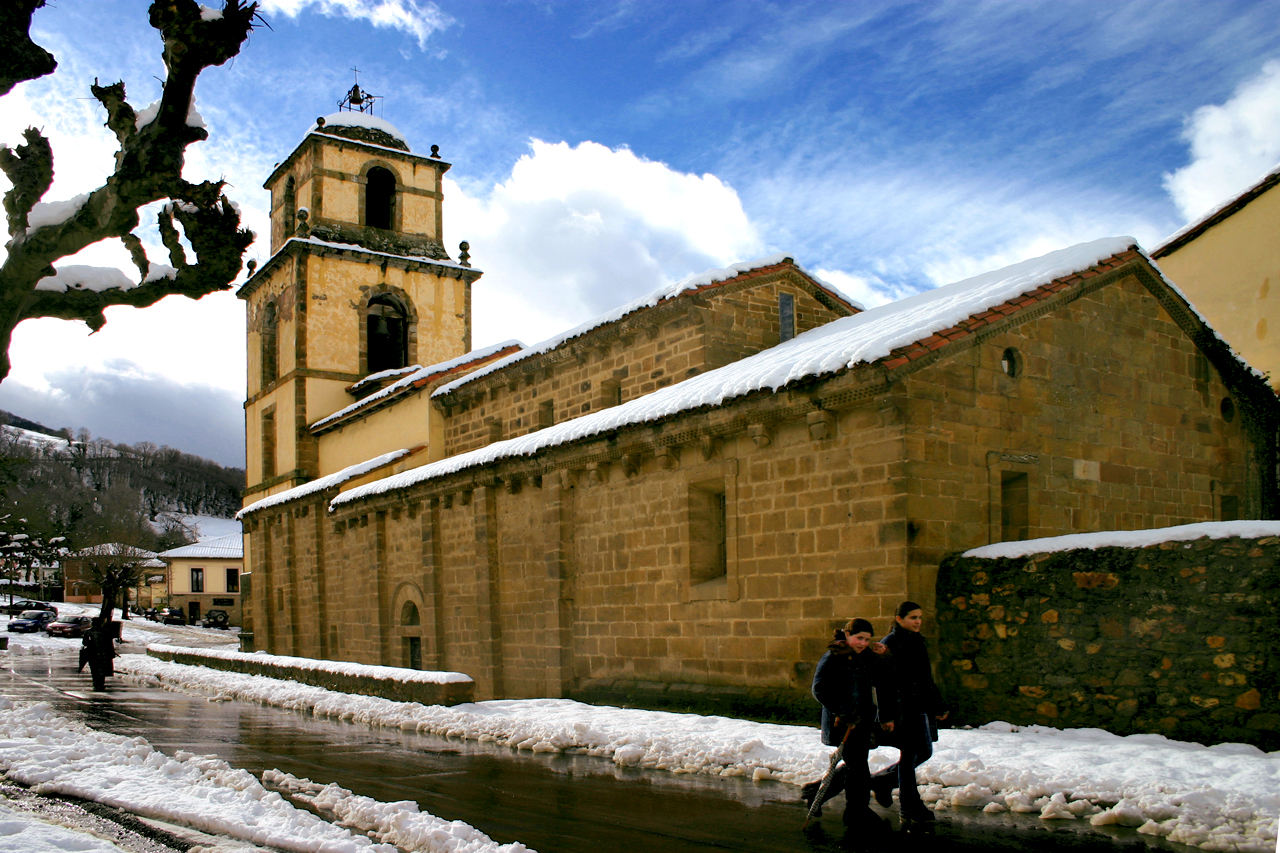
- Colegiata de San Pedro de Teverga
- Location: Asturias, Spain

Colegiata de San Pedro de Teverga is a church in Asturias, Spain.

== See also ==
- Asturian art
- Catholic Church in Spain
