= Church of Santa María de Sariegomuerto =

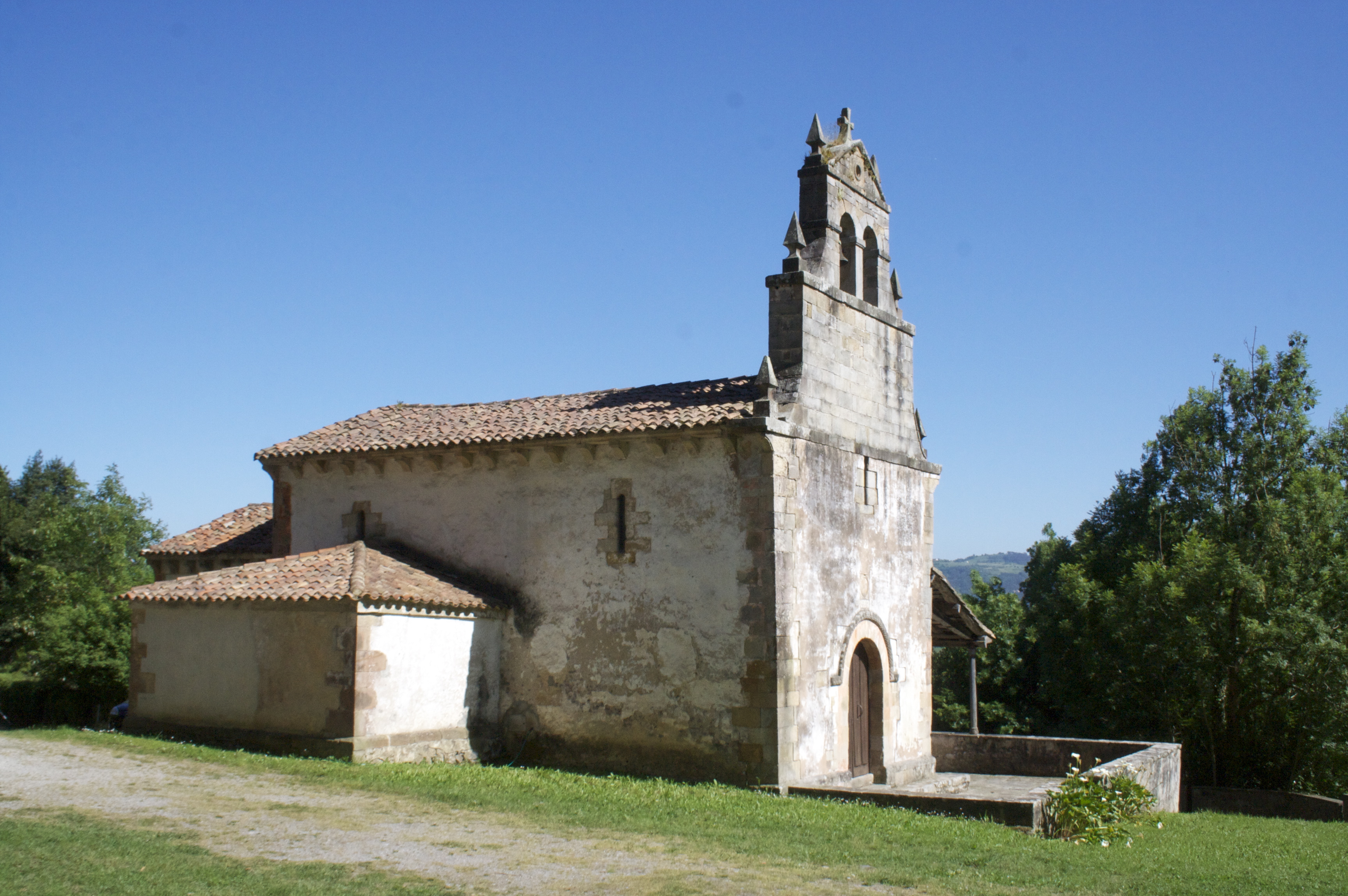
- Church of Santa María de Sariegomuerto
- 43.48100°N 5.48360°W
- Location: Asturias, Spain

The Church of Santa María de Sariegomuerto (Spanish: Iglesia de Santa María de Sariegomuerto) is a Romanesque-style, Roman Catholic church in the municipality of Villaviciosa, in the community of Asturias, Spain.

The church appears to date originally from the 12th to 13th centuries; it appears to be mentioned in documents in 921, linked to grants by Ordoño II to the Oviedo Cathedral. The church has undergone a number of refurbishments along the centuries. The church was rebuilt after arson during the Spanish civil war.
