= Capilla de Santa Eugenia de Sobrecueva =

Coordinates: 43°21′03″N 5°03′55″W

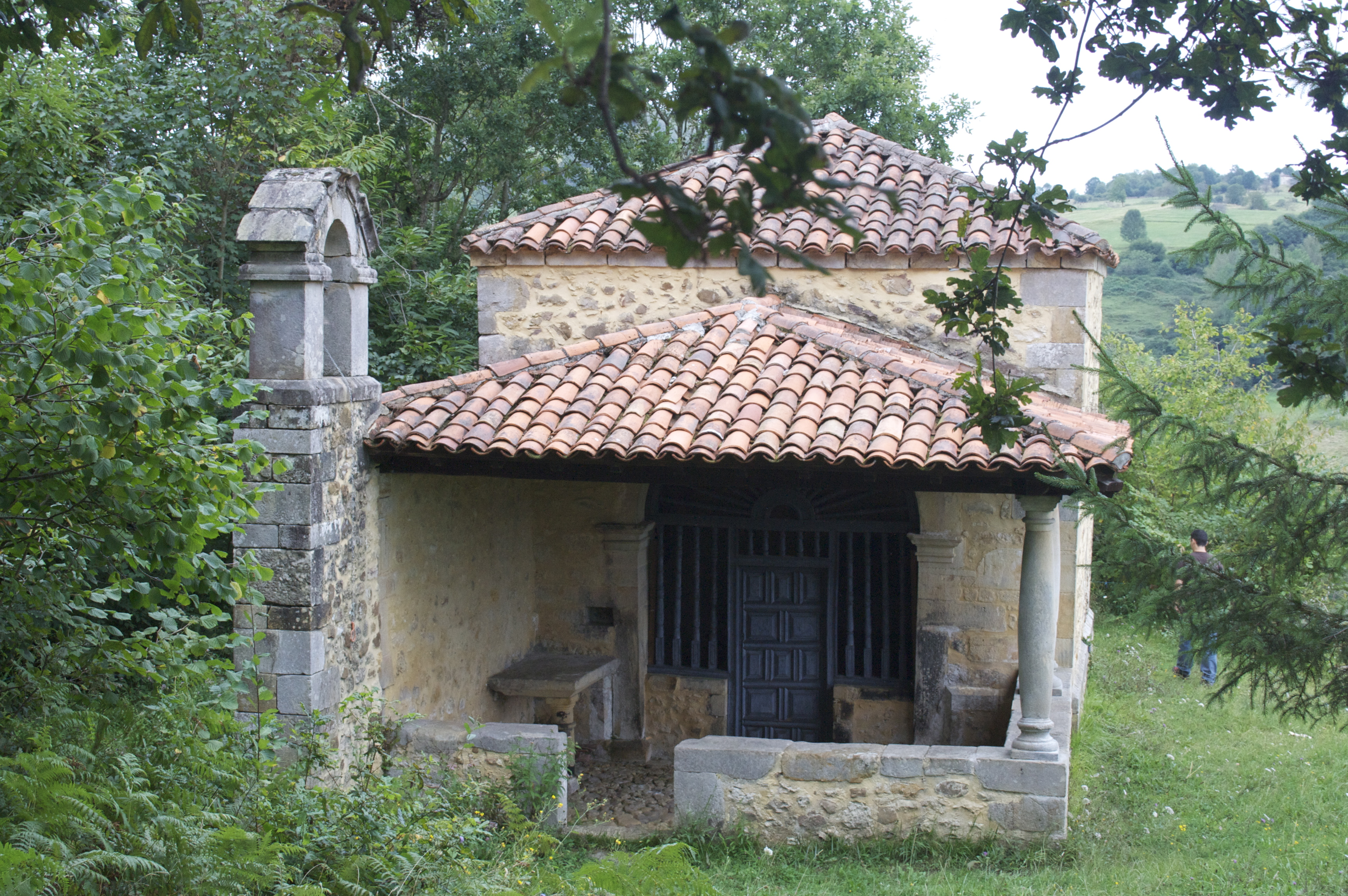
- Capilla de Santa Eugenia, Sobrecueva, Cangas de Onís, Asturias.
- Capilla de Santa Eugenia de Sobrecueva
- Location: Asturias, Spain

Capilla de Santa Eugenia de Sobrecueva (Spanish: [kaˈpiʎa ðe ˈsanta ewˈxenja ðe soβɾeˈkweβa]) is a church in Asturias, Spain.

== See also ==
- Asturian art
- Catholic Church in Spain
