= Ferrera Palace =

Palace in Spain

Coordinates: 43.5561°N 5.9222°W

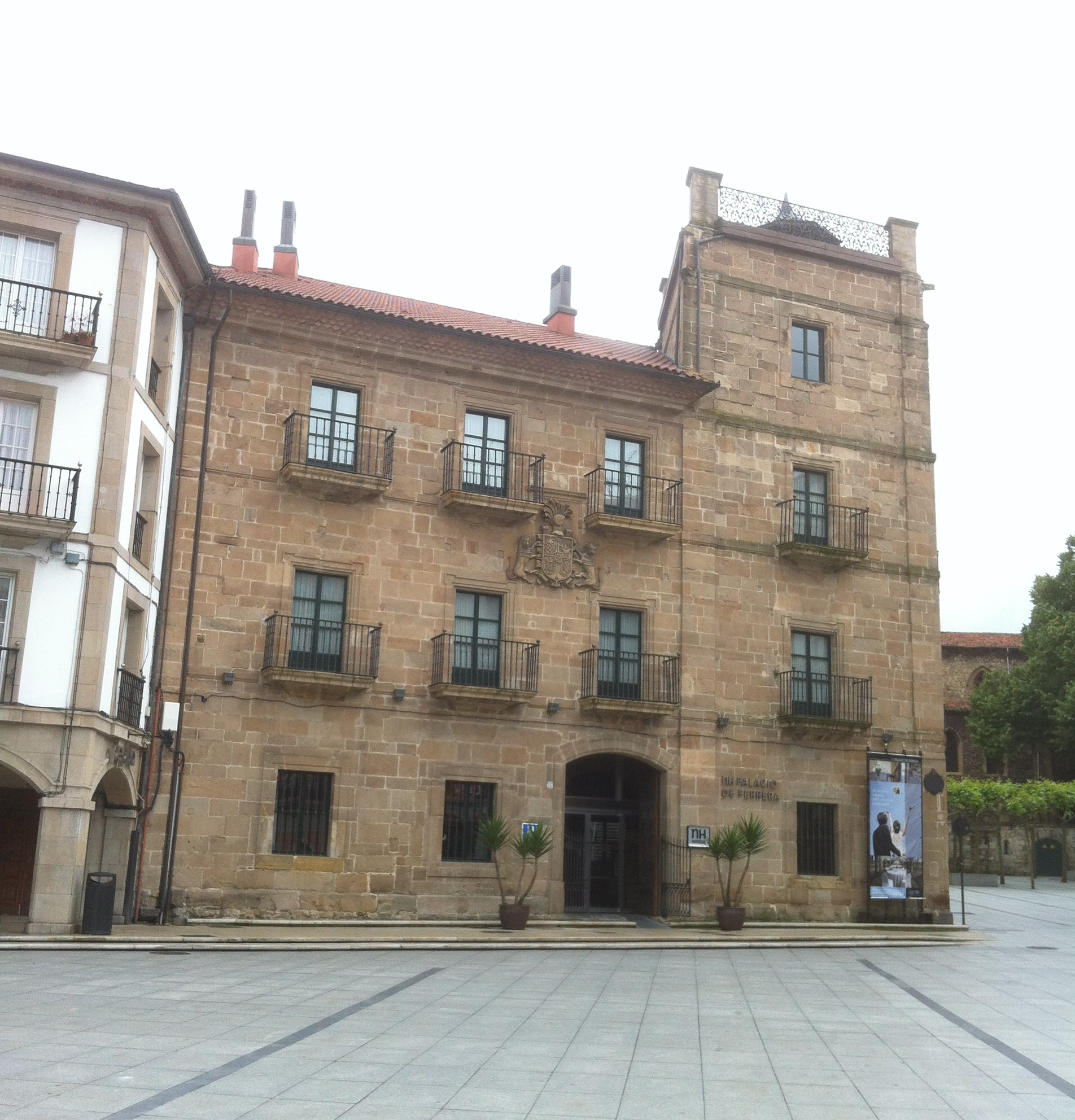
Ferrera Palace

The Ferrera Palace (Palacio de Ferrera) is a palace located in the municipality of Avilés, Asturias, Spain. It is one of the oldest Baroque buildings in the province. Since its construction until 1974, it served as the residence of the Marquis and his close relatives, besides being chosen by the Spanish royal family when arriving in the area as a guesthouse. In 2003 the building underwent significant renovation and was converted into a five-star hotel by hotel chain NH Hoteles.
