= Iglesia de Santa María de la Oliva (Villaviciosa) =

- Church of Santa María de la Oliva
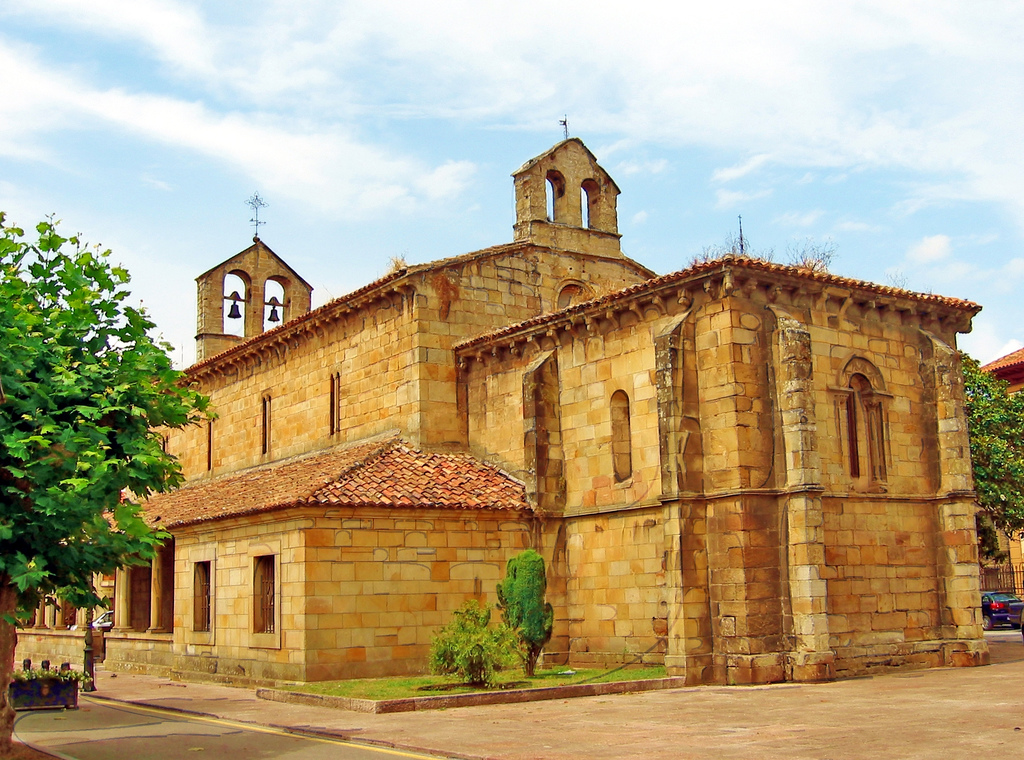
- Church of Santa María de la Oliva, in Villaviciosa.
- Iglesia de Santa María de la Oliva
- 43.48193°N 5.43683°W
- Location: Villaviciosa, Principality of Asturias
- Country: Spain
- Denomination: Roman Catholic

Architecture
- Architectural type: Gothic church
- Style: Spanish Gothic
- Completed: 1270

Iglesia de Santa María de la Oliva is a late 13th to early 14th century stone church in Villaviciosa of the autonomous community of the Principality of Asturias, in Spain. The church and town is on the coast of Asturias in northern Spain.

It was built in the late 13th and early 14th centuries. It is one of the later Romanesque churches in the Villaviciosa area and has Gothic elements making it a transitional church between Romanesque and Gothic.

== See also ==
- Monasterio de Santa María de Valdediós
- Spanish Gothic architecture
