= Maqua Palace =

Coordinates: 43.5566°N 5.9236°W

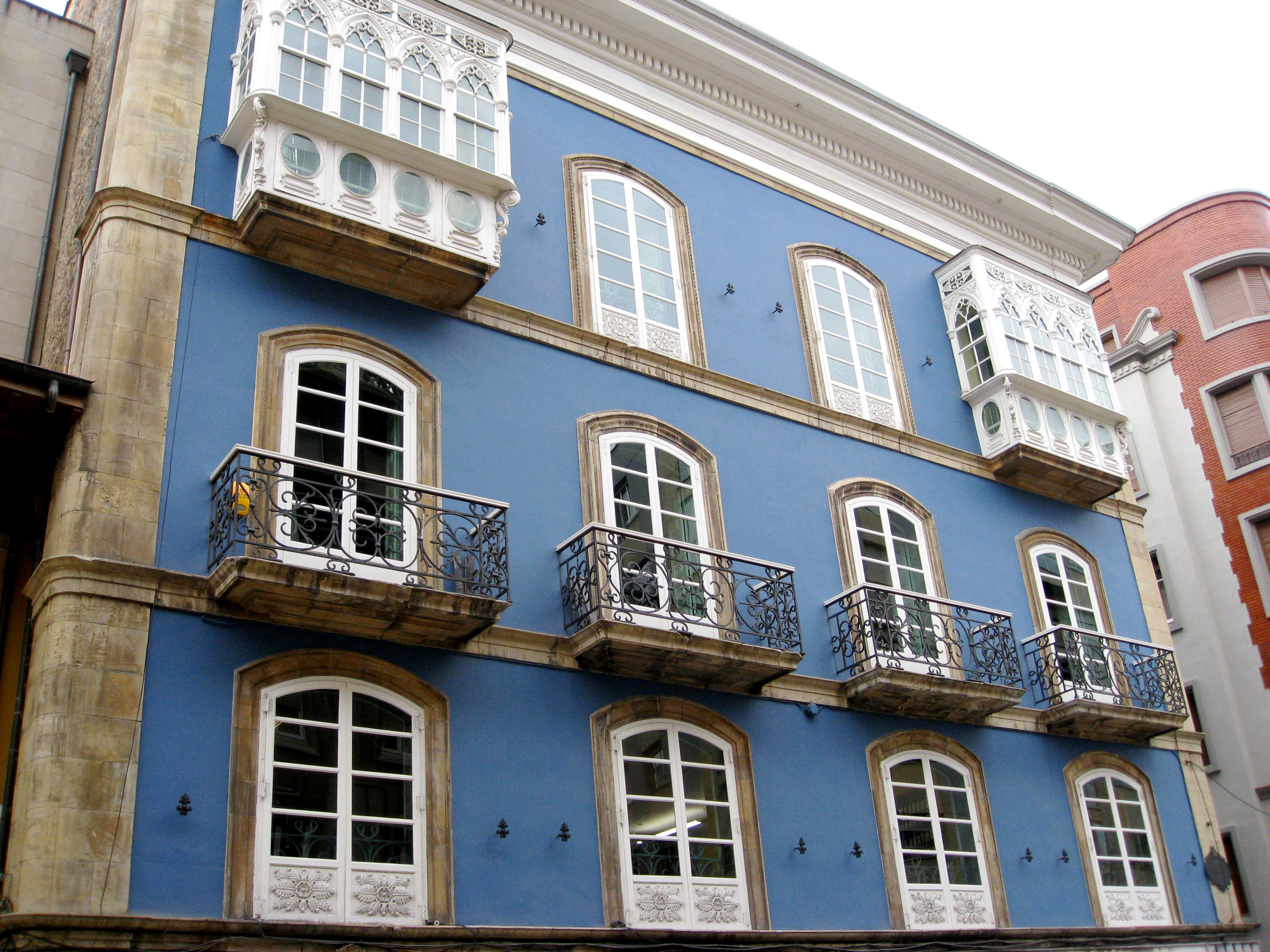
Maqua Palace

The Maqua Palace (Palacio de Maqua) is located in the town of Aviles, Asturias, Spain.

The palace was built during the nineteenth and twentieth centuries for the Maqua family. It has three floors; the highlight being the third floor balconies.

The palace was restored between 1983 and 1997 and was declared a culturally important monument on 3 October 1991. In 2006, the façade was restored and renovated for use as municipal offices.
