= Church of Santa María de Junco =

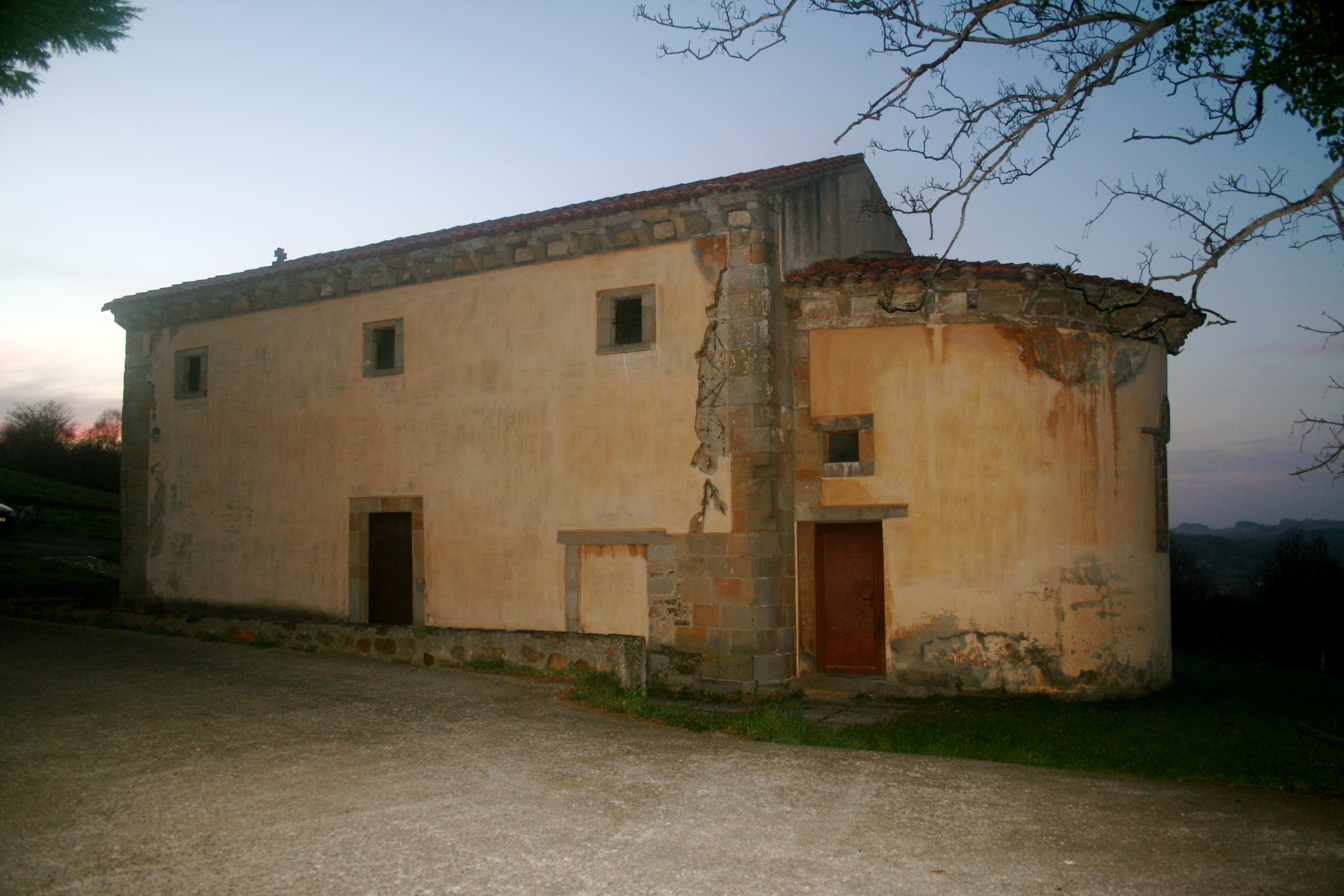

- Location within Spain
- 43°26′27″N 5°03′50″W
- Location: Asturias, Spain

The Church of Santa María de Junco (Spanish: Iglesia de Santa María de Junco) is a Romanesque-style, Roman Catholic church located in the municipality of Ribadesella in Asturias, Spain. A church at the site was erected in the early 13th century.
