= San Isidoro, Oviedo =

Coordinates: 43°21′38″N 5°50′43″W

Iglesia de San Isidoro (Oviedo)
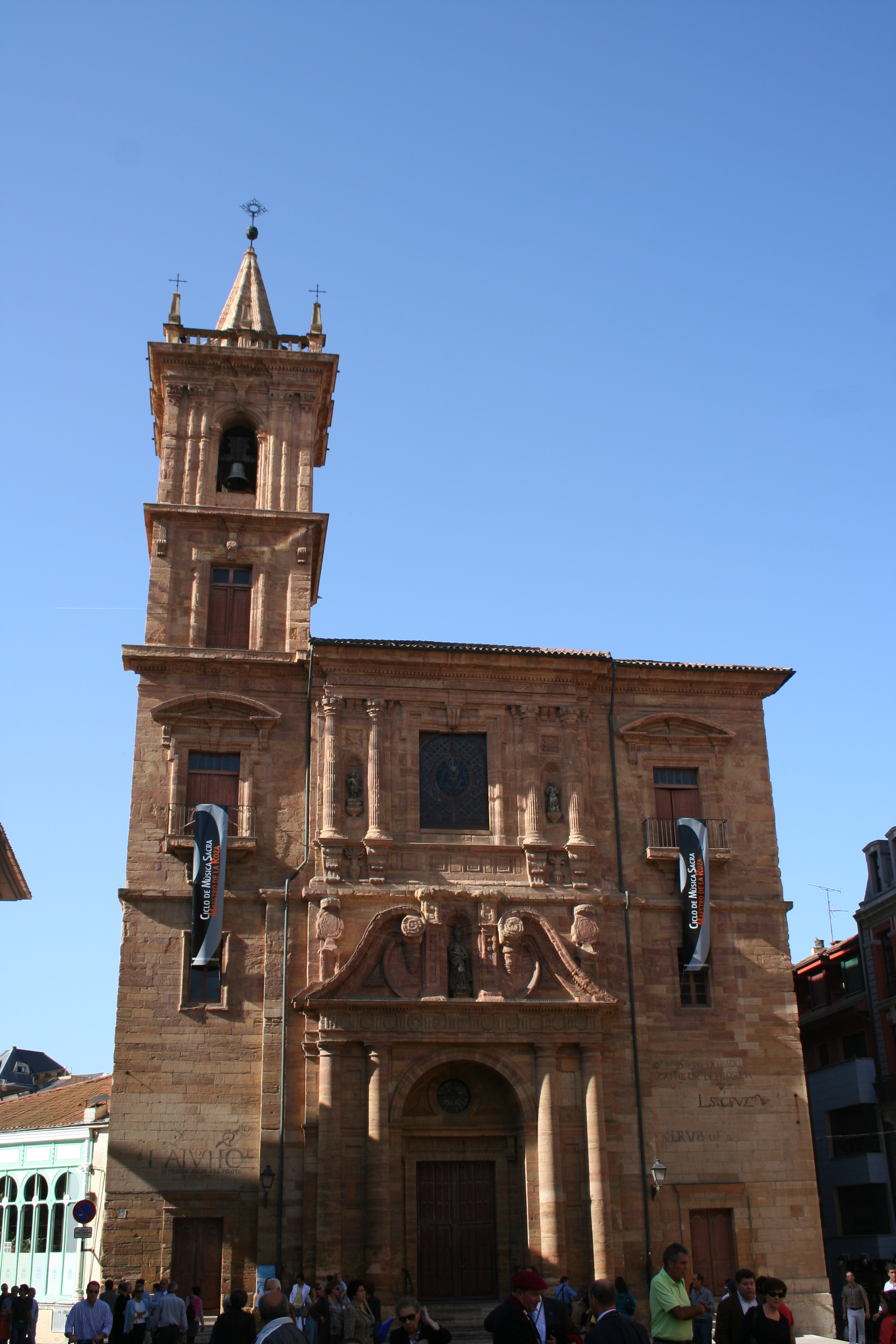
- Iglesia de San Isidoro (Oviedo)
- Location: Oviedo, Asturias, Spain

Iglesia de San Isidoro (Oviedo) is a church in Oviedo, Asturias, Spain. It was opened in 1587.

== See also ==
- Asturian art
- Catholic Church in Spain
- List of Jesuit sites
