= Castle of Soto (Aller) =

- Castillo de Soto (Spanish)
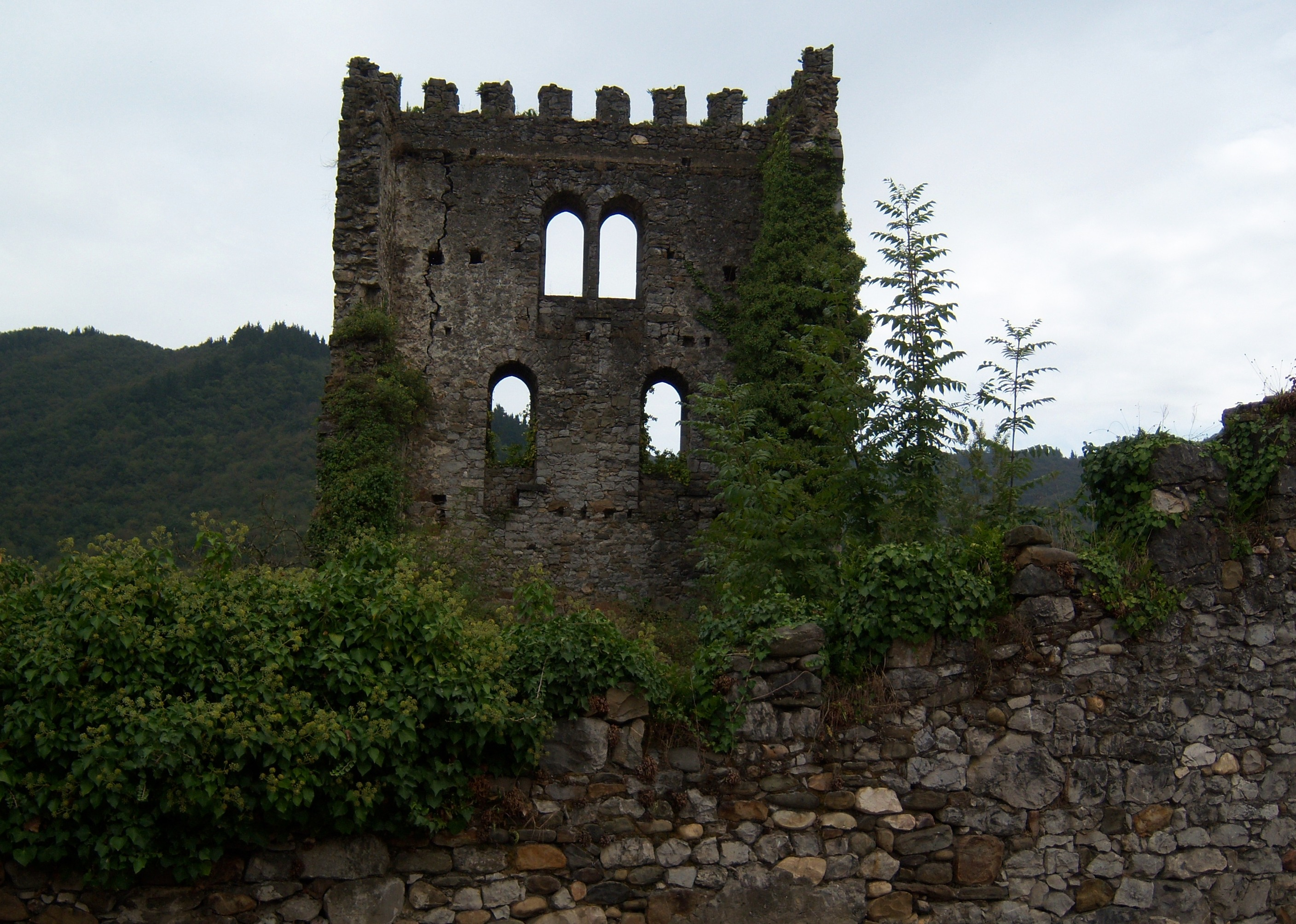

- Location within Spain
- 43°09′48″N 5°38′40″W
- Location: Aller, Asturias, Spain

Spanish Cultural Heritage
- Official name: Castle of Soto (Aller)
- Type: Immovable
- Criteria: Monument
- Designated: 1983

Castle of Soto (Aller) is a castle situated in Aller, Asturias, Spain. It was declared Bien de Interés Cultural on 10 July 1975.
