= Monastery of Santa María de Villanueva de Oscos =

Former monastery in Asturias, Spain

Coordinates: 43°18′37″N 6°58′52″W

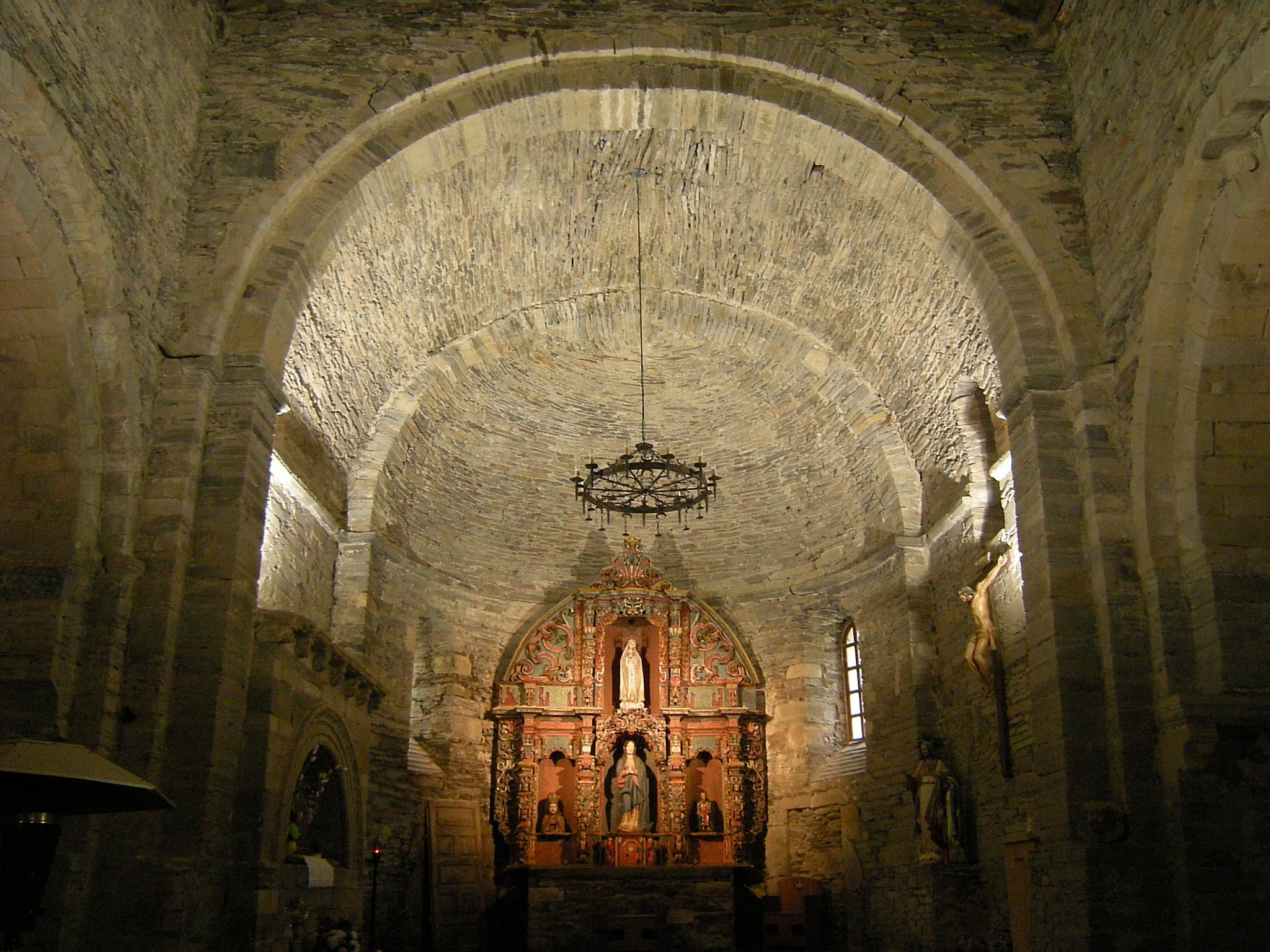
The monastery's church is partly Romanesque

Monasterio de Santa María de Villanueva de Oscos is a monastery in Asturias, Spain. It was founded in the 12th century as a Benedictine house.

The monastic community was closed by the ecclesiastical confiscations of Mendizábal. The church has remained in use as a parish church.

The cartulary preserves 616 parchments about the Middle Ages: 32 from the 12th century, 261 from the 13th century, 224 from the 14th century and 99 from the 15th century.
