= Santa Maria =

Santa Maria, Sta. Maria, Santa María or Santa Marija is a title of Mary, mother of Jesus, in languages such as Italian, Portuguese, Spanish and Maltese.

It may also refer to:

== Arts and entertainment ==
=== Music ===
- "Santa Maria" (Tatjana song), released 1995
- "Santa Maria" (Kenshi Yonezu song), released 2013
- "Santa Maria", a 1976 song by Canadian rock band Trooper
- "Santa Maria", a 1980 song by Guido & Maurizio De Angelis, a.k.a. Oliver Onions
- "Santa Maria" a 1989 song by Rambo Amadeus from the album Hoćemo gusle
- "Santa Maria", a 1999 song by German band In Extremo
- "Santa Maria", a 2001 song by Gotan Project
- "Santa Maria", a 2001 song by The Frames
- "Santa María", a 2019 song by Bad Gyal featuring Busy Signal
- "Santa Maria", a 1980 song by Neoton Família

=== Other media ===
- Santa Maria (operetta) by Oscar Hammerstein I
- Santa Maria, early title of the 2017 film Richie

== Churches ==
=== Italy ===
==== Florence ====
- Florence Cathedral or Basilica di Santa Maria del Fiore
- Santa Maria degli Angeli, Florence
- Santa Maria dei Candeli
- Santa Maria del Carmine, Florence
- Santa Maria Novella, basilica

==== Rome ====
- Basilica di Santa Maria Maggiore
- Basilica of Santa Maria del Popolo
- Basilica of Santa Maria in Ara Coeli
- Santa Francesca Romana, Rome, or Santa Maria Nova
- Santa Maria dei Miracoli and Santa Maria in Montesanto
- Santa Maria della Consolazione
- Santa Maria della Pace
- Santa Maria della Pietà in Camposanto dei Teutonici
- Santa Maria di Loreto, Rome
- Santa Maria in Cosmedin
- Santa Maria in Trastevere
- Santa Maria in Via Lata
- Santa Maria Maddalena
- Santa Maria sopra Minerva

==== Venice ====
- Abbazia della Misericordia or Santa Maria dell'Abbazia della Misericordia
- Gesuati, or Santa Maria del Rosario
- Santa Maria dei Miracoli, Venice
- Santa Maria della Salute
- Santa Maria Formosa
- Santa Maria Gloriosa dei Frari, Basilica
- Santa Maria Zobenigo or Santa Maria del Giglio

==== Other places in Italy ====
- Santa Maria del Regno, Ardara
- Papal Basilica of Saint Mary of the Angels in Assisi
- Santa Maria Maggiore, Bergamo
- Church of Santa Maria Assunta (Esine)
- Sant'Angelo (Milan) or Santa Maria degli Angeli
- Santa Maria presso San Satiro, Milan
- Santa Maria di Montedoro, Montefiascone
- Santa Maria in Strada, Monza
- Santa Maria degli Angeli, Murano
- Santa Maria e San Donato, Murano
- Santa Donna Regina Nuova or Santa Maria Donna Regina Nuova, Naples
- Santa Maria della Catena, Naples
- Santa Maria di Costantinopoli, Naples
- Santa Maria Donna Regina Vecchia, Naples
- Martorana or Church of Santa Maria dell'Ammiraglio, Palermo
- Santa Maria del Carmine, Pavia
- Santa Maria di Canepanova, Pavia
- Santa Maria della Catena, Palermo
- Santa Maria della Spina, Pisa
- Santa Maria delle Carceri, Prato
- Santa Maria in Organo, Verona

=== Malta ===
- Santa Marija Chapel, Żabbar

=== Portugal ===
- Church of Santa Maria do Olival, a church in Tomar
- Jerónimos Monastery#Church of Santa Maria, a church in Lisbon

=== Spain ===
==== Asturias ====
- Church of Santa María de Celón
- Church of Santa María de Junco
- Santa María de la Corte
- Church of Santa María de Llas
- Church of Santa María de Sabada
- Church of Santa María de Sariegomuerto
- Church of Santa María de Villanueva

==== Other places in Spain ====
- Church of Santa María de Bendones
- Colegiata de Santa María la Mayor (Toro)
- Santa María de Melque, Toledo
- Santa María del Naranco, Oviedo

=== United States ===
- Iglesia San Isidro Labrador y Santa María de la Cabeza, Sabana Grande, Puerto Rico

== People ==
- Antonia Santa María (born 1982), Chilean actress
- Cara Santa Maria (born 1983), American science educator and blogger
- Domingo Santa María (1825–1889), Chilean president
- Jodi Sta. Maria (born 1982), Filipina actress

== Places ==
=== Argentina ===
- Santa María, Catamarca
- Santa María Department (disambiguation), two departments in Argentina
- Santa María de Punilla
- Santa María, Misiones
- Santa María, Salta
- Santa María del Buen Ayre, old name of Buenos Aires
- Santa María Centro, Santa Fe
- Santa María Norte, Santa Fe

=== Brazil ===
- Santa Maria, Federal District
- Santa Maria, Rio Grande do Norte
- Santa Maria, Rio Grande do Sul
- Santa Maria das Barreiras, Pará
- Santa Maria da Boa Vista, Pernambuco
- Santa Maria do Cambucá, Pernambuco
- Santa Maria (Carira), Sergipe
- Santa Maria do Herval, Rio Grande do Sul
- Santa Maria de Itabira, Minas Gerais
- Santa Maria de Jetibá, Espírito Santo
- Santa Maria Madalena, Rio de Janeiro
- Santa Maria do Oeste, Paraná
- Santa Maria do Pará, Pará
- Santa Maria do Salto, Minas Gerais
- Santa Maria da Serra, São Paulo
- Santa Maria do Suaçuí, Minas Gerais
- Santa Maria do Tocantins, Tocantins
- Santa Maria da Vitória, Bahia

=== Cape Verde ===
- Santa Maria, Cape Verde

=== Chile ===
- Santa María, Chile

=== Colombia ===
- Santa María, Huila
- Santa María, Boyacá

=== El Salvador ===
- Santa María, Usulután

=== Guatemala ===
- Santa María Cahabón
- Santa María Chiquimula
- Santa María de Jesús
- Santa María Ixhuatán
- Santa María Visitación
- Santa María (volcano)

=== Italy ===
- Santa Maria Nuova, Marche, a comune in Marche
- Santa Maria di Castellabate, a town in Campania
- Santa Maria degli Angeli, Assisi

=== Malta ===
- Saint Mary's Battery, Comino, known in Maltese as Batterija ta' Santa Marija
- Tigné Point, originally known as Punta di Santa Maria

=== Mexico ===
- Misión Santa María de los Ángeles, Baja California
- Santa María de los Ángeles, Jalisco
- Santa María del Oro, Durango
- Santa María del Oro, Nayarit
- Santa María del Río, San Luis Potosí
- Santa María, Oaxaca (disambiguation), several places

=== Panama ===
- Santa María District, Panama
- Santa María, Herrera

=== Paraguay ===
- Santa María, Paraguay, a city and district

=== Peru ===
- Santa María District, Huaura, a district in Huaura province
- Santa María del Mar District, Lima, a district in Lima province

=== Philippines ===
- Santa Maria, Bulacan, a first-class urban municipality in the province of Bulacan
- Santa Maria, Davao Occidental
- Santa Maria, Ilocos Sur, home to the UNESCO World Heritage Site, the Minor Basilica of Our Lady of the Assumption, one of the Baroque Churches of the Philippines
- Santa Maria, Isabela
- Santa Maria, Laguna
- Santa Maria, Pangasinan
- Santa Maria, Romblon

=== Portugal ===
- Santa Maria (Tavira), a civil parish in the municipality of Tavira
- Sé, Santa Maria e Meixedo, a civil parish in the municipality of Bragança
- Cabo de Santa Maria (Faro), a cape south of Faro; the southernmost point of mainland Portugal
- Santa Maria Island, in the eastern group of the Azores

=== Romania ===
- Sântă Măria, a river in Sălaj County
- Sântă Măria, a village in the commune Sânmihaiu Almașului, Sălaj County

=== Spain ===
==== Barcelona ====
- Santa Maria de Besora, Osona
- L'Esquirol, Osona, known as Santa Maria de Corcó until 2014
- Santa Maria de Martorelles
- Santa Maria de Merlès
- Santa Maria de Miralles
- Santa Maria de Palautordera
- Santa Maria del Mar, Barcelona
- Santa Maria d'Oló

==== Burgos ====
- Santa María del Campo
- Santa María del Invierno
- Santa María del Mercadillo
- Santa María Ribarredonda

==== Other places in Spain ====
- El Pla de Santa Maria, Tarragona
- El Puerto de Santa María, Cádiz
- Santa María de Guía de Gran Canaria, Canary Islands
- Santa María de Sando, Salamanca
- Santa María del Páramo, León
- Santa María La Antigua, Valladolid

=== Switzerland ===
- Santa Maria in Calanca
- Santa Maria Val Müstair

=== United States ===
- Santa Maria, California
- Santa Maria, Texas
- Santa Maria Estate, U.S. Virgin Islands
- Santa Maria Valley AVA, California wine region

=== Vanuatu ===
- Gaua, formerly known as Santa Maria Island

== Transport ==
- Santa María (ship), used by Christopher Columbus
- Spanish frigate Santa María
- Santa María (Mexibús), a BRT station in Tultitlán, Mexico
- Santa Maria, a cruise liner hijacked in 1961
- AL-60B-1 Santa Maria, variant of the Aermacchi AL-60
- Santa María (1511 ship), Spanish vessel and 1510s shipwreck

== Other uses ==
- Santa Maria (building), a skyscraper in Miami, Florida, US
- Santa Maria (crater), on Mars

== See also ==
- List of churches consecrated to Santa Maria Assunta
- Maria Maddalena (disambiguation)
- Marie-Madeleine (disambiguation)
- Maria Magdalena (disambiguation)
- Mary Magdalene (disambiguation)
- Santa Maria Airport (disambiguation)
- Santa Maria Island (disambiguation)
- Santa María la Real (disambiguation)
- Santa Maria River (disambiguation)
- Santamaria (disambiguation)
