= Santamaria =

Santamaria (also spelled Santamaría or Santa Maria) is a surname from the Latin Arch in Europe. The name, a reference to the Blessed Virgin Mary meaning Holy Mary or Saint Mary, means the same thing in the Spanish, Italian, Portuguese and Catalan languages. In Arabic, the equivalent name is Mariam. The surname has spread to the Americas, especially South America, via immigration and colonisation.

== People ==
Notable people with the surname include:

- Santamaria (born 1982), Portuguese footballer
- Abel Santamaría (1927–1953), leader in the Cuban Revolutionary movement
- Adriana Martin Santamaria (born 1986), Spanish international footballer
- Álvaro Santamaría (born 1950), Colombian former footballer
- Anderson Santamaría (born 1992), Peruvian football central defender
- Aristodemo Santamaria (1892–1974), Italian footballer
- Arno Santamaria (born 1978), French singer-songwriter
- B. A. Santamaria (1915–1998), Australian political activist and journalist
- Baptiste Santamaria (born 1995), French footballer
- Borja García Santamaría (born 1990), Spanish footballer
- Carlos Sanz de Santamaría (1905–1992), 18th Permanent Representative of Colombia to the UN
- Carmen Quesada Santamaría (born 1969), Costa Rican politician and teacher
- Christian Santamaría (born 1972), retired Honduran football player
- Claudio Santamaria (born 1974), Italian actor
- David Santamaria (born 1990), American soccer player
- Dom Santamaria (born 1979), drummer from the Australian band Epicure
- Domingo Caycedo Santamaria (1783-1843), former Vice-president of Gran Colombia
- Elvira Santamaría (1929–1999), Argentine ballet dancer, milonguera and choreographer
- Enrique Sanz de Santamaría (born 1974), Colombian-American sports executive
- Eva Santamaría (born 1971), Spanish singer
- Fabio Santamaria (1925–2000), Cuban wrestler
- Gorka Santamaría (born 1995), Spanish footballer
- Grimoaldo Santamaria (1883–1902), Italian Roman Catholic clerical student from the Passionists
- Guillermo París Sanz de Santamaría (1820–1867), Colombian businessman
- Guillermo Silva Santamaria (1921–2007), Colombian painter, printmaker and Surrealist
- Haydée Santamaría (1922–1980), Cuban revolutionary and politician
- Higinio Ortúzar Santamaria (1915–1982), Chilean footballer
- Ignacio Pérez Santamaria (born 1980), Spanish retired footballer
- Ingrid Sala Santamaria, Filipina pianist
- Jodi Santamaria (born 1982), Filipina actress
- José Santamaría (1929–2026), Uruguayan football player and coach
- José Antonio Santamaría (1946–1993), Spanish footballer
- José Luis Santamaría (born 1973), Spanish footballer
- Josep Santamaría (born 1957), Spanish politician
- Joseph Santamaria (born 1948), Australian jurist and judge of the Court of Appeal of the Supreme Court of Victoria
- Juan Santamaría (1831–1856), national hero of Costa Rica
- Kamahl Santamaria (born 1980), New Zealand television journalist
- Kevin Santamaría (born 1991), Salvadoran footballer
- Luis Santamaría (born 1975), Honduran footballer
- Luis Fraiz Santamaria (born 1993), Panamanian footballer
- María Elena Santamaría Gómez (1971), Mexican pro wrestler
- Maria Helen Bella Avenila Santamaria (1949–2008), Filipina actress and singer
- Mario Santamaria (born 1950), Nicaraguan boxer
- Mauricio Cárdenas Santamaría (born 1962), Colombian politician and 69th Minister of Finance
- Mauricio Santa María Salamanca (born 1966), Colombian economist and politician
- Miguel Álvarez Santamaría (born 1945), Mexican politician
- Mikel Santamaría (born 1987), Spanish footballer
- Mongo Santamaría (1917–2003), Afro-Cuban Latin jazz percussionist
- Monika Santa Maria, Filipina-Malaysian fashion model
- Nadia Calviño Santamaría (born 1968), Spanish economist and civil servant
- Nathalie Santamaria (born 1973), French singer
- Orlando Santamaría (1920–1992), Cuban sports shooter
- Paco Santamaría (born 1936), Spanish international footballer
- Pedro Santamaría (1942–2017), Spanish cyclist
- Roberto Santamaría Ciprián (1985), Spanish footballer
- Roberto Santamaría Calavia (1962), Spanish footballer
- Sabrina Santamaria (born 1993), American tennis player of Filipino and Panamanian descent
- Santi Santamaria (1957–2011), Spanish Catalan chef
- Santiago Santamaría (1952–2013), Argentine footballer
- Sergio Santamaría (born 1980), Spanish footballer
- Soraya Sáenz de Santamaría (born 1971), Spanish People's Party politician
- Stéphane Santamaria (born 1977), French canoeist
- Wilson Santamaría (born 1981), Bolivian lawyer, politician, and sociologist
- Yūsuke Santamaria (born 1971), stage name of Yūsuke Nakayama, a Japanese playwright, singer and graphics designer

== See also ==
- Santa Maria (disambiguation)
