= Santamaria (disambiguation) =

Santamaria is a surname (including people named Santamaría).

Santamaria may also refer to:

- Santamaria (band), a Portuguese eurodance band
- Santamaria (footballer) (born 1982), Portuguese footballer
- Santamaria (motorcycles), Italian manufacturer of motorcycles
- Santamaría Bullring, a bull ring in Bogotá, Colombia
- Juan Santamaría International Airport, an airport in Costa Rica

== See also ==
- Sântămăria-Orlea, Hunedoara County, Transylvania, Romania
- Santa Maria (disambiguation)
