= Bernardo da Venezia =

Italian architect and sculptor

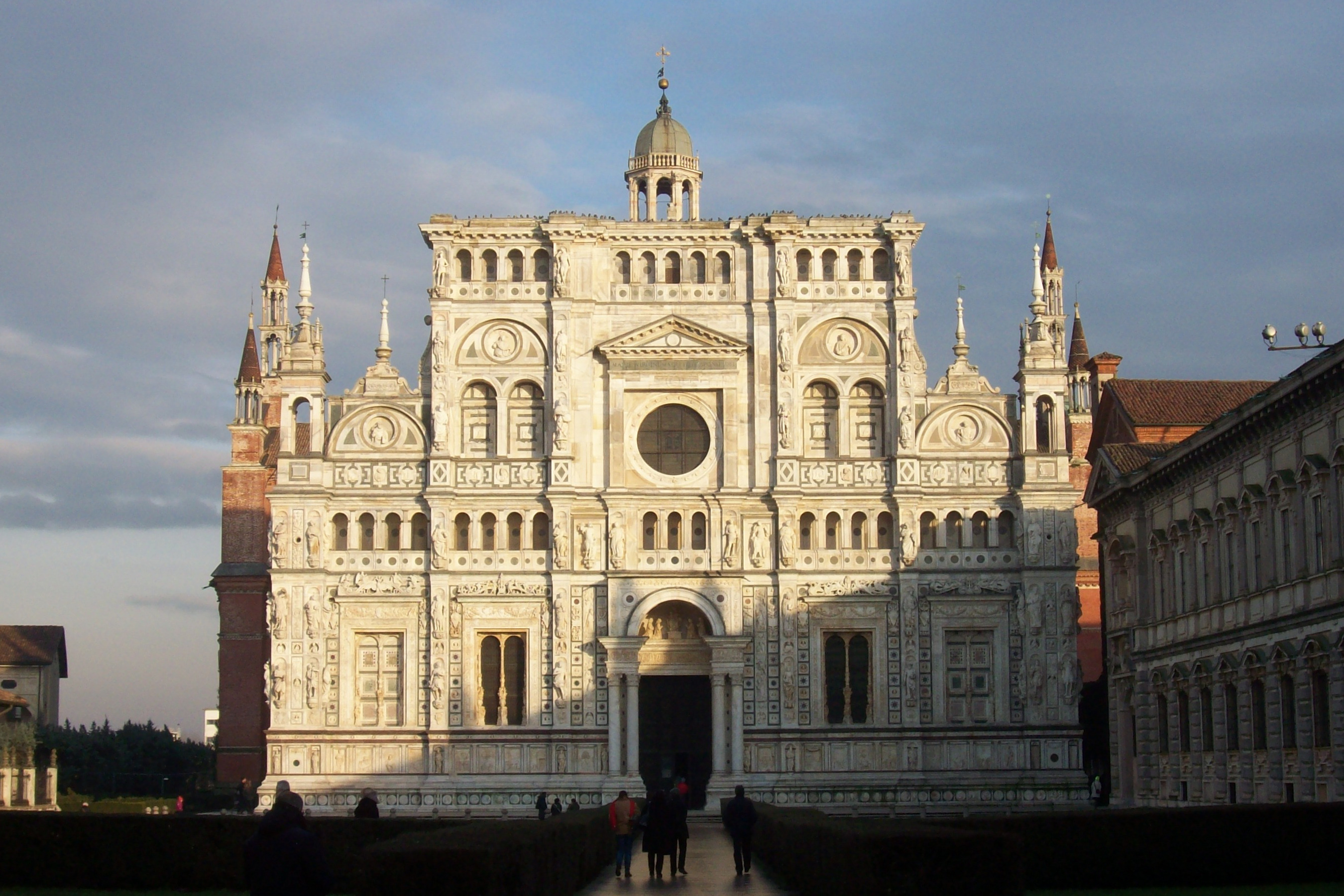
Certosa di Pavia

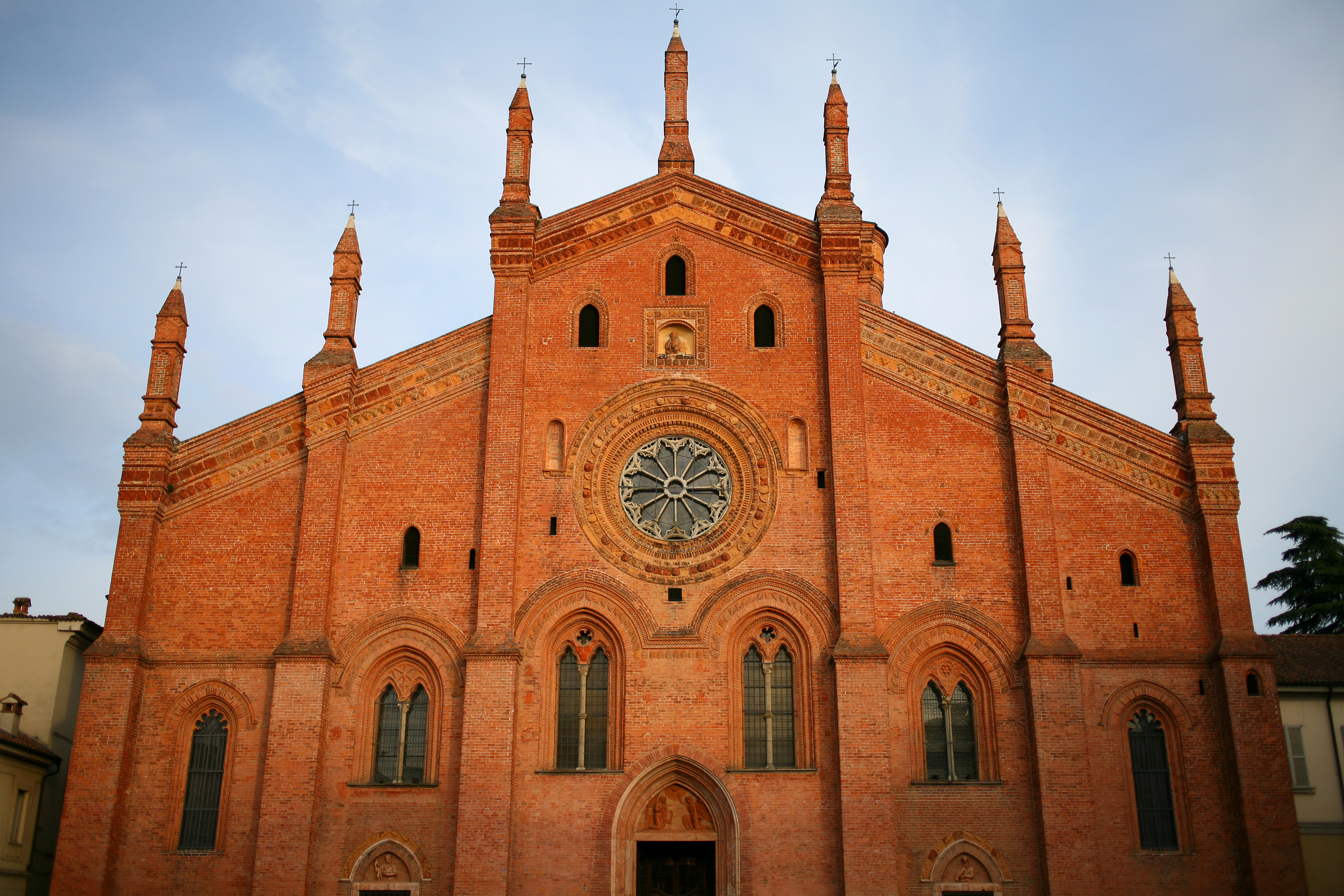
Santa Maria del Carmine, Pavia

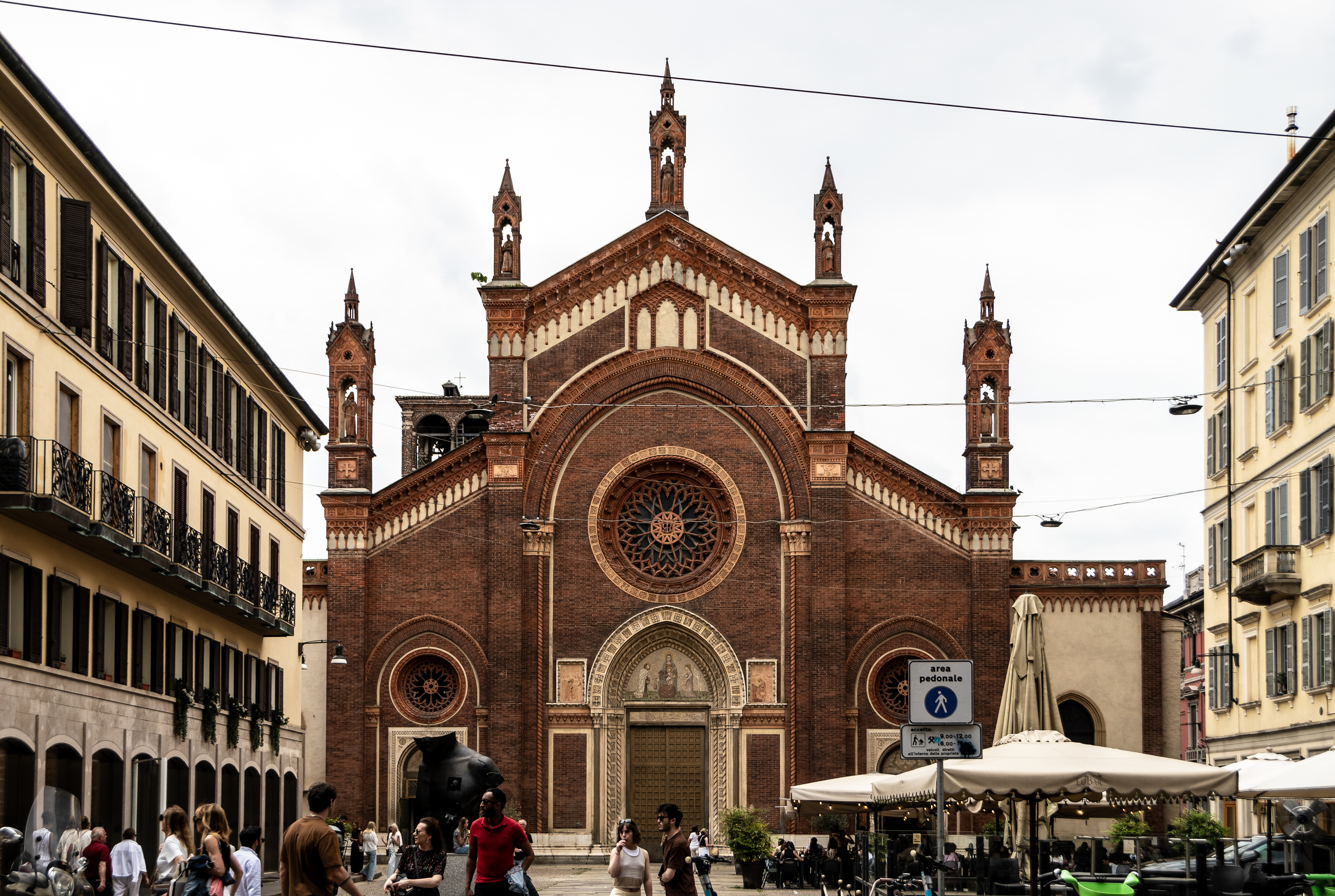
Santa Maria del Carmine, Milan, Neo-Gothic façade by Carlo Maciachini (1880)

Bernardo da Venezia was an Italian architect and sculptor of the Renaissance. Active in Lombardy as an architect, stonemason and wood carver, at the end of the fourteenth century and the beginning of the fifteenth. He was commissioned by Gian Galeazzo Visconti to build the Certosa di Pavia, Santa Maria del Carmine in Pavia, and Santa Maria del Carmine in Milan.

== Biography ==
Despite being called "da Venezia", there is no evidence of his activity in Venice. The name is mentioned for the first time in Pavia in documents of October 8, 1391, in the service of Duke Gian Galeazzo Visconti, and that the Italian requests it. This indicates that he had a certain reputation and that he had already been busy for some time with important work. Although there are no more precise documents, he was then probably building the castle of Pavia, where there are some similarities with the Gothic architecture of Venice., especially in the four-arched loggia and the trefoil arches of the inner courtyard, with terracotta decorations and openwork. He also took part in other important works in Pavia including the construction of the Church of Santa Maria del Carmine, probably begun around 1390, continued until 1397 (interrupted) and that of the Certosa di Pavia. In 1400, he was commissioned by Visconti to design Santa Maria del Carmine in Milan, based on Santa Maria del Carmine in Pavia. Due to financial constraints, half of the columns of the Milanese church were constructed from recycled material, and the other half in brick, instead of using larger composite columns, as was done in the Pavese church. The Milanese church collapsed in 1446, with architect Pietro Antonio Solari later being tasked with its reconstruction in compliance with Bernardo da Venezia's original design.
