= Santa Maria del Carmine, Milan =

Church in Milan, Italy

Santa Maria del Carmine
- Chiesa di Santa Maria del Carmine
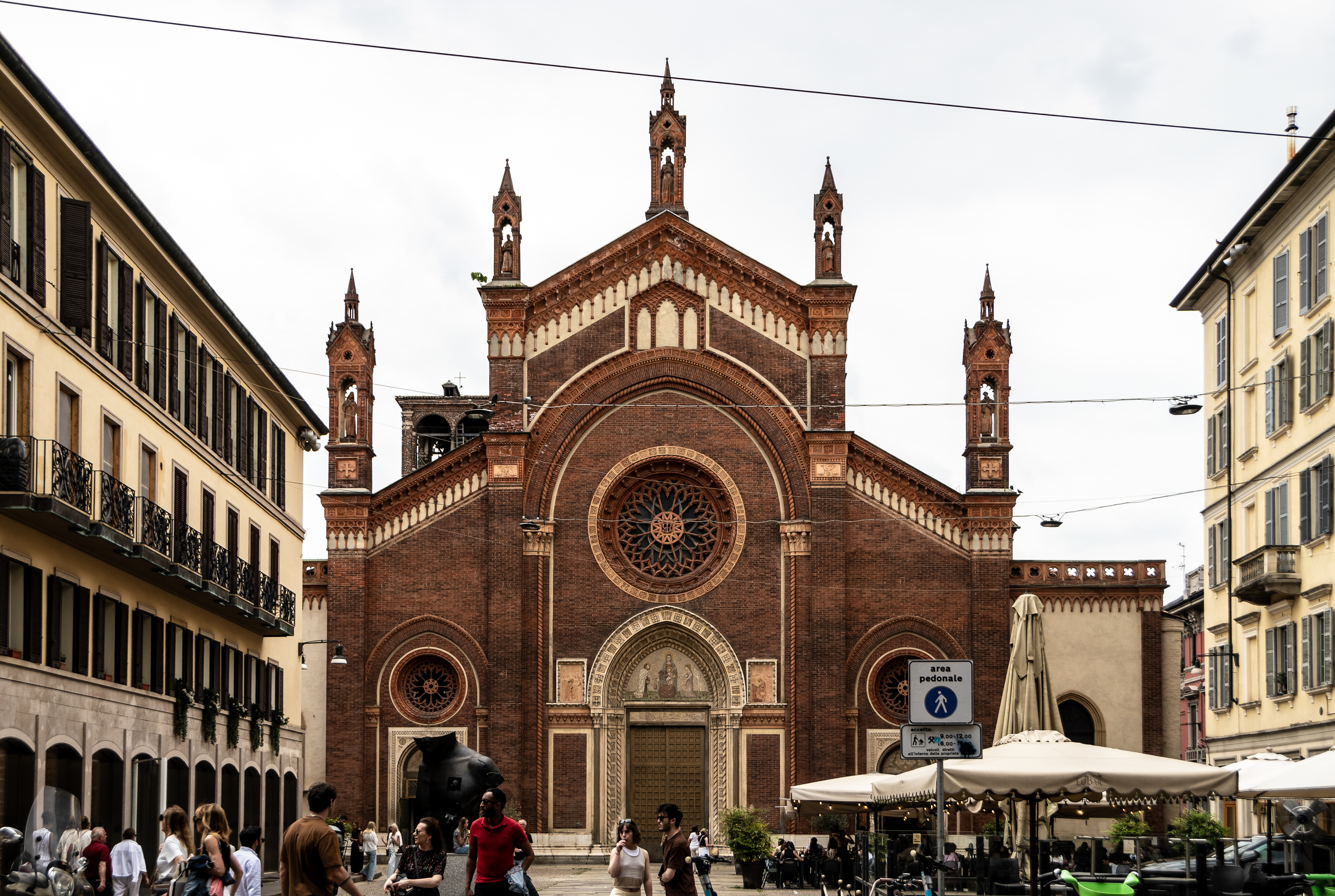
- Façade seen from Piazza del Carmine.
- Click on the map for a fullscreen view.
- 45°28′14″N 9°11′10″E
- Location: Piazza del Carmine 2, Milan
- Country: Italy
- Denomination: Catholic Church
- Tradition: Latin Rite
- Religious order: Carmelites
- Website: chiesadelcarmine.net

History
- Dedication: Mary, mother of Jesus

Architecture
- Architect(s): Bernardo da Venezia, Carlo Maciachini
- Style: Baroque
- Years built: 1400-1880
- Groundbreaking: 1400
- Demolished: Collapsed in 1446, then rebuilt

Administration
- Archdiocese: Archdiocese of Milan
- Parish: Santa Maria del Carmine, San Carlo in Santa Maria del Carmine

Santa Maria del Carmine is a church in Milan, Italy. Its construction began in 1400. It collapsed in 1446, and was later rebuilt.

== History ==
In 1268, the Carmelites obtained a site near Sforza Castle where, starting from the 14th century, they built a convent with an annexed church. The latter was, however, destroyed in a fire in 1330. The friars moved to another convent in 1399.

In 1400, construction of the new church began under the design of friar and architect Bernardo da Venezia. The design was based on another church by the same name in Pavia (Santa Maria del Carmine), also by Bernardo da Venezia. Due to financial constraints, half of the columns of the church were constructed from recycled material salvaged from the former church, and the other half from brick, instead of using larger composite columns, as done in the original Pavese church. The church collapsed in 1446, possibly due to issues associated with these financial constraints. Architect Pietro Antonio Solari was tasked with the church's reconstruction under Ludovico il Moro, in compliance with Bernardo da Venezia's original design. In the mid-15th century, the church became a favourite destination for aristocratic burials, as testified by the numerous noble tombs in the chapels and niches. In the 17th century, the presbytery was remade in the Baroque style. The current façade was designed by Carlo Maciachini and completed in 1880.

The church has two parishes, the Spanish-speaking parish of Santa Maria del Carmine and the English-speaking parish of San Carlo in Santa Maria del Carmine.

== Description ==
The interior has a nave and two aisles. They are covered by crossed vault ceilings and separated by large circular pillars. The appearance of face brick is produced by painted plaster.

In the naves and transepts are several artworks, including works by Camillo Procaccini, Carlo Francesco Nuvolone and Carlo Fiamminghino. One of Procaccini’s works depicts St Charles Borromeo Praying (1585) and there are other works by the painter in the Chapel of Madonna del Carmine, as well as a Madonna statue at the altar.

The high altar has a small temple inspired by that in the Milan Cathedral.
