= Monastery of Santa María la Real (Palencia) =

Monastery in Aguilar de Campoo, Spain

Coordinates: 42°47′43″N 4°16′21″W

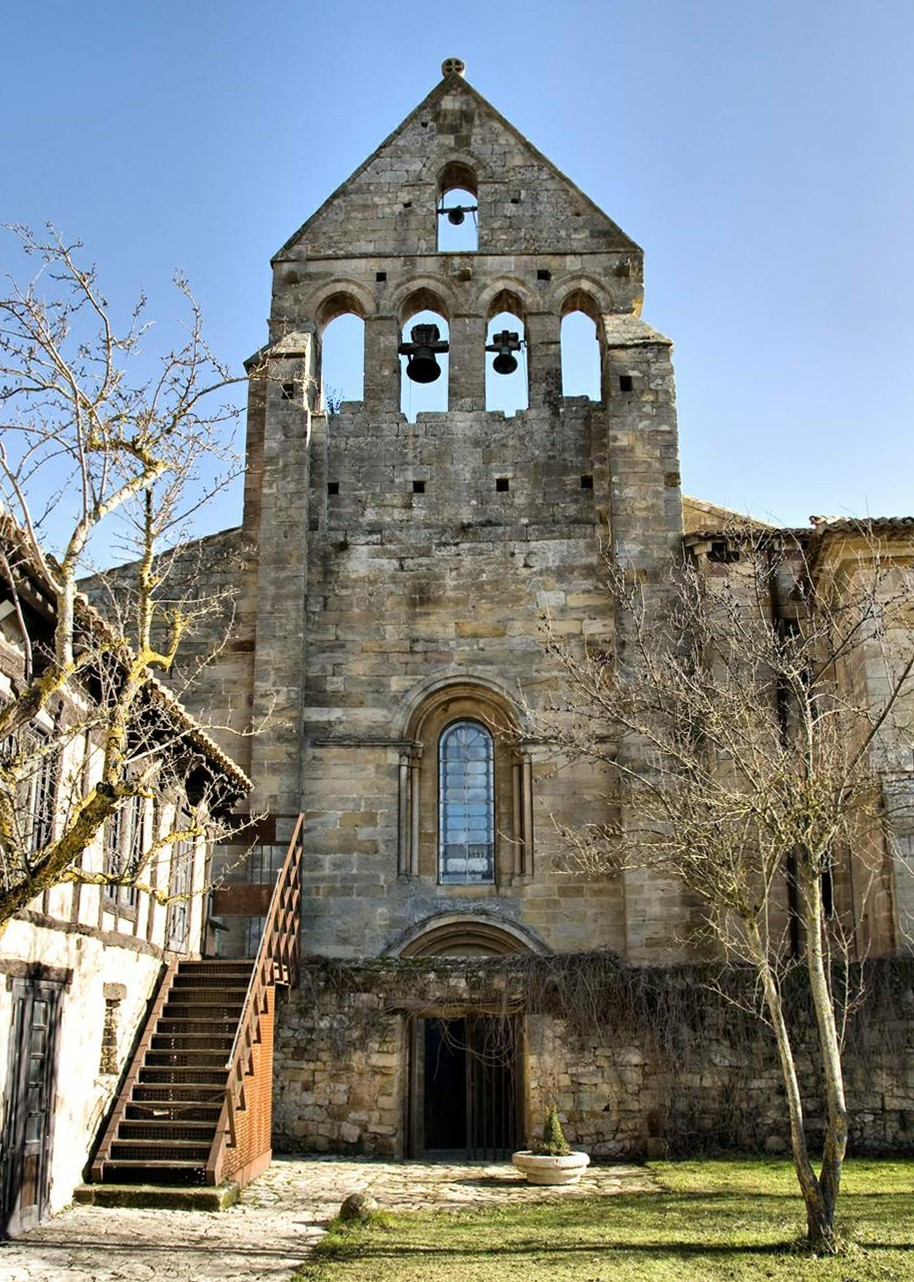
Santa María la Real

Santa María la Real is a monastery in Aguilar de Campoo, province of Palencia, Spain.

Santa María la Real is a common name for monasteries in Spain, and indicates a royal connection, in this case to King Alfonso VIII of Castile.

From the 12th century the monastery was the home of a Premonstratensian community. The architecture is in a transitional style between Romanesque and Gothic.

== Conservation ==
The monastery was closed in the 19th century as a result of the Ecclesiastical Confiscations of Mendizábal. The buildings fell into ruin and in 1871 various capitals (dated circa 1200) were removed to the National Archaeological Museum, Madrid.

In 1914 the monastery was declared a national monument. The restored buildings today house a Secondary Education School (Instituto de Secundaria Santa María La Real) as well as a Foundation for the study of the Romanesque. Palencia is claimed to have the highest density of Romanesque monuments in Europe, and the monastery is promoted in the context of a Romanesque heritage route.
