= Bernardino Lanzani =

Italian painter

Bernardino Lanzani (1460-c. 1530) was an Italian painter of the Renaissance, active mainly in Pavia and Bobbio.

He is also known as Bernardino Colombano since he was born in San Colombano al Lambro. He was a pupil of Ambrogio da Fossano. He painted a triptych for the church of Santa Maria del Carmine, Pavia. He painted for the Abbey of San Colombano in Bobbio, and the church of San Teodoro in Pavia.

== Sources ==
- Boni, Filippo de' (1852). Biografia degli artisti ovvero dizionario della vita e delle opere dei pittori, degli scultori, degli intagliatori, dei tipografi e dei musici di ogni nazione che fiorirono da'tempi più remoti sino á nostri giorni. Seconda Edizione. Venice; Googlebooks: Presso Andrea Santini e Figlio. p. 238.
