= Roberto Santamaría (footballer, born 1962) =

Spanish footballer

Roberto
Personal information
- Full name: Roberto Santamaría Calavia
- Date of birth: 12 March 1962 (age 64)
- Place of birth: Pamplona, Spain
- Height: 1.77 m (5 ft 9 1/2 in)
- Position: Goalkeeper

Youth career
- Osasuna

Senior career*
Years	Team	Apps	(Gls)
1981–1985	Osasuna B	86	(0)
1985–1995	Osasuna	272	(0)
1985–1986	→ Lleida (loan)	29	(0)
1995–1997	Málaga	33	(0)
Total		420	(0)
- * Club domestic league appearances and goals

Roberto Santamaría Calavia (born 12 March 1962), known simply as Roberto, is a Spanish former professional footballer who played as a goalkeeper.

== Club career ==
Born in Pamplona, Navarre, Roberto spent 12 professional years at local CA Osasuna, being the team's undisputed starter in eight of those. In the 1986–87 season he contributed 19 games, but the side barely avoided La Liga relegation.

In the 1990–91 campaign, as Osasuna finished a best-ever fourth place in the top division, Roberto played 3,191 minutes in 36 matches. Two years later, he did not concede one single goal for 488 minutes, which stood in the club's record books for more than 20 years.

However, the emergence of 19-year-old Javier López Vallejo, also brought up at Osasuna, prompted his exit in 1995 at the age of 33 to Segunda División B side Málaga CF, and he closed out his career after two more seasons. He then returned to his first club, acting as goalkeeper coach for both the first and second teams.

== Personal life ==
Roberto's nephews, Mikel and Roberto Santamaría Ciprián, also became footballers, the latter a goalkeeper who too represented Osasuna and Málaga.
