= Santa Maria Island (disambiguation) =

Santa Maria Island is the southernmost of the Azores, a Portuguese archipelago in the North Atlantic Ocean.

Santa Maria Island may also refer to:

- Santa María Island, Chile, in the Bío Bío Region of Chile
- Santa Maria Island, a former name of Gaua, Vanuatu
- Santa Maria Island, a former name of Floreana Island in the Galápagos Archipelago, Ecuador

== See also ==
- Santa Maria (disambiguation)
