= Santa María la Real =

Santa Maria la Real (Saint Mary the Royal) can refer to a number of places in Spain, including:

== Cathedrals ==
- Almudena Cathedral, Madrid
- Pamplona Cathedral

== Churches ==
- Santa María la Real, Aranda de Duero
- Basílica de Santa María la Real de Covadonga
- Santa María la Real, Olite
- Santa María la Real, Sangüesa
- Santa María la Real, Tanes, Caso, Asturias

== Monasteries ==
- Monastery of Santa María la Real (Palencia), Aguilar de Campoo
- Monastery of Santa María la Real, Fitero, Navarre
- Monastery of Santa María la Real, Villamayor de los Montes, Villamayor de los Montes, Castile and León
- Santa María la Real de Irache, Ayegui, Navarre
- Monastery of Iranzu, or Royal Monastery of Saint Mary of Iranzu, Abárzuza, Navarre
- Santa María la Real de Las Huelgas, Burgos
- Monastery of Santa María la Real de las Huelgas, Valladolid, Duero
- Santa María la Real of Nájera, La Rioja
- Monastery of Santa María la Real in Obona, Tineo, Asturias
- Santa María de la Oliva, Carcastillo, Navarre
- St. Bernard de Clairvaux Church, Sacramenia, Segovia

== Towns ==
- Santa María la Real de Nieva, Province of Segovia
