= Josep Santamaría =

Spanish politician

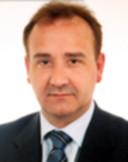
Image of Josep Antoni Santamaría

Josep Antoni Santamaría i Mateo (Xirivella, Spain, 16 July 1957) is a Spanish politician who belongs to the governing Spanish Socialist Workers' Party (PSOE).

Married with two children, Santamaría began architectural studies but did not complete them and subsequently worked for the Valencian regional administration. Until his election to the national parliament he served as mayor of the town of Xirivella to the immediate west of Valencia. He also served as PSOE secretary in the l'Horta Sud area which covers the satellite towns south of Valencia city.

He was elected to the Congress of Deputies as a deputy for Valencia in 2004 and has remained a deputy since then. For the 2008 election he was placed seventh on the PSOE list (the party had won seven seats at the 2004 election) and was the fifteenth of the sixteen candidates elected.
