= Monastery of Santa María la Real in Obona =

Monastery in Obona, Spain

Coordinates: 43°20′31″N 6°28′47″W

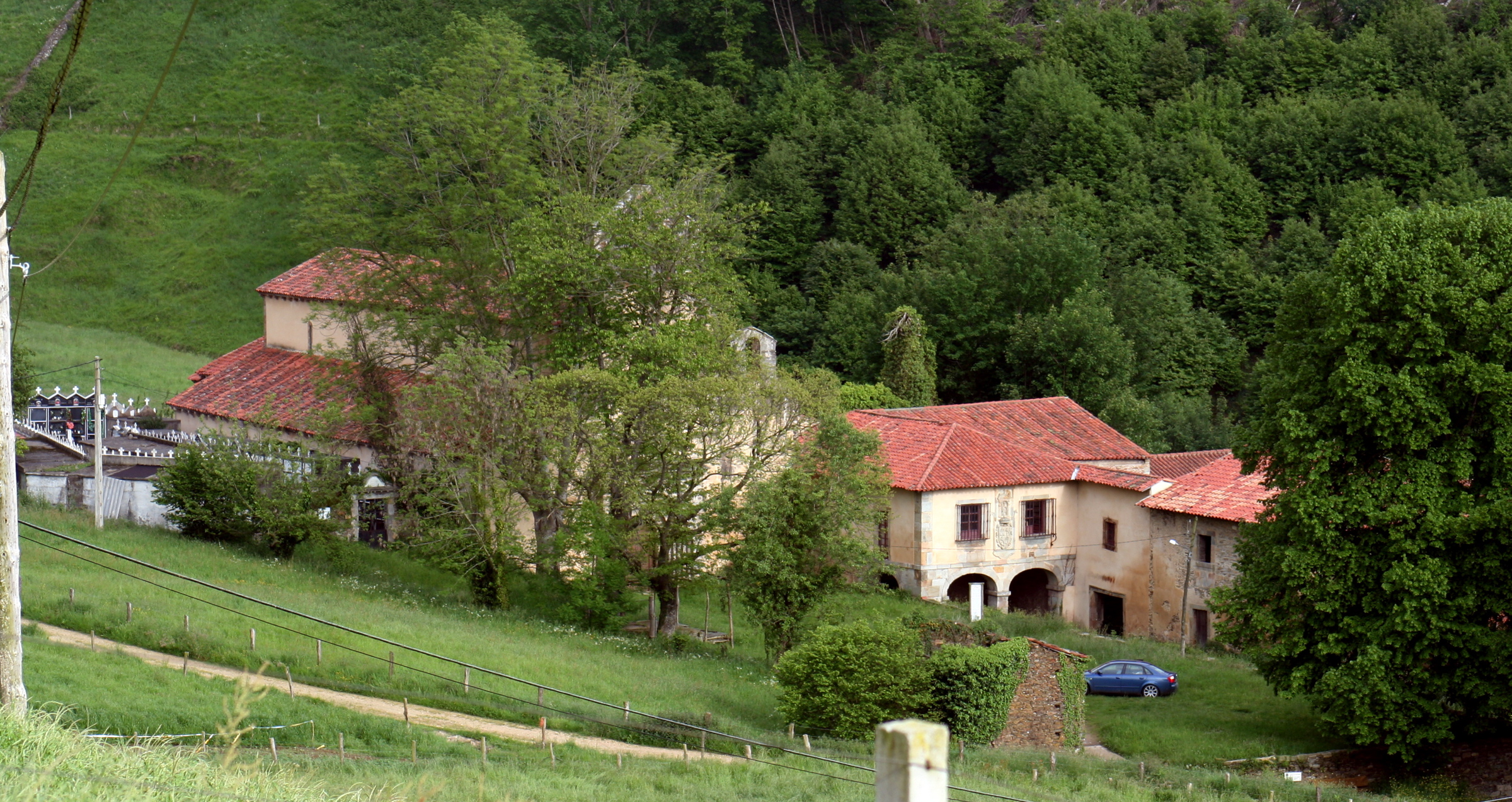
Monasterio de Santa María la Real

The Monastery of Obona (Spanish: Monasterio de Santa María la Real de Obona) is a monastery in the village of Obona, Asturias, Spain. It was declared a monumento nacional in 1982.
