= Santa Maria River =

Several rivers are named Santa Maria River.

== Argentina ==
- Two rivers

== Bolivia ==
- Two rivers

== Brazil ==
- Six rivers, including:
  - Santa Maria River (Mato Grosso do Sul)
  - Santa Maria River (Rio Grande do Sul)
  - Santa Maria River (Sergipe)
  - Santa Maria River (Vitória)

== Chile ==
- Two rivers

== Colombia ==
- Two rivers

== Cuba ==
- Five rivers

== Italy ==
- One river

== Mexico ==
- Seven rivers, including:
- Santa Maria River (Chihuahua)
- Santa Maria River (San Luis Potosi)

== Panama ==
- Santa Maria River (Panama)

== Peru ==
- Two rivers

== Philippines ==
- Four rivers

== Spain ==
- Two rivers

== United States ==
- Santa Maria River (Arizona)
- Santa Maria River (California)

== Venezuela ==
- Santa Maria River (Venezuela)
