= Santa Maria (Carira) =

- Village
- Location of Carira in Sergipe

- Location within Brazil
- Coordinates: 10°12′6″S 37°44′44″W
- Country: Brazil
- State: Sergipe
- Municipality: Carira
- Elevation: 276 m (906 ft)

Santa Maria or Projeto de Assentamento Santa Maria (Brazilian Portuguese pronunciation: [ˈsɐ̃ntɐ mɐˈɾjɐ]) is a village in the municipality of Carira, state of Sergipe, in northeastern Brazil. It is named after Saint Mary.

== See also ==
- List of villages in Sergipe
