= Santa Maria in Strada, Monza =

Religious building of Monza, Italy

Coordinates: 45°34′56″N 9°16′27″E

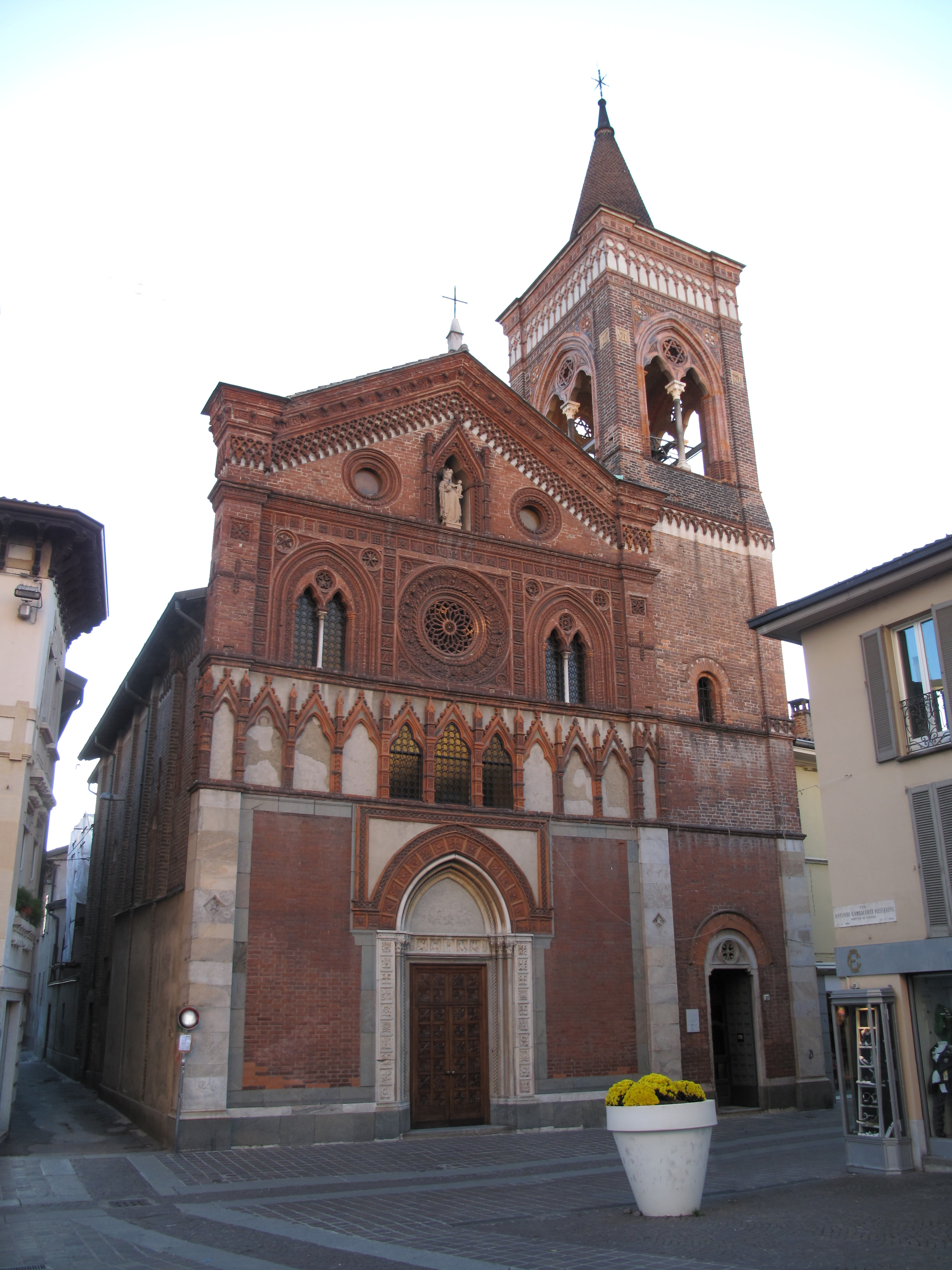
Santa Maria in Strada

Santa Maria in Strada is a church in Monza, Lombardy, northern Italy.

== History ==
According to the chronicler Bonincontro Morigia, the church was begun in 1357 over a pre-existing Franciscan convent. The original edifice was subsequently enlarged and enriched with a choir, a sacristy and a bell tower in 1421. In 1610, by order of archbishop Charles Borromeo, the barrel-vault was added, and the mullioned windows were closed. In 1756, architect Giovanni Battista Riccardi added a frame at the base of the vault and several stucco fake columns, reconstructed the high altar in marble and gilded bronze, and opened several chapels.

Beginning in 1862, the convent served as a kindergarten. The façade was restored in 1870 on a design by Carlo Maciachini.

== Description ==
The brickwork façade is triangular at the top, with numerous decorations and geometric elements. It is formed by horizontal bands separated by frames. The portal has a brickwork arch and marble architrave dating to the 19th century. Over the portal is a series of fake niches with (apart from the three central ones, which are windows) traces of 14th-century frescoes. In the third band are rich terracotta decorations, while in the middle of the façade is a rose window with concentric decorations, flanked by two ogival double mullioned windows with square frames. The decoration of the façade's summit includes a statue of the "Madonna with Child", between two circles and Lombard bands crowning the upper edge.

The bell tower, originally of the same height as the façade, is decorated with mullioned windows, Lombard bands and a cusp.

The interior has a rectangular hall, a semi-octagonal choir and a presbytery. The secondary altars on the sides are decorated with frescoes and a canvas of the Moving of the Icon of Madonna del Buon Consiglio (1756), by Francesco Ferrario. The High Altar is also from 1756, and is made of marble, hardstones and bronze.

The presbytery and the choir are decorated with frescoes by Giambattista Gariboldi, including an Assumption of the Virgin (and a Glory of St. Augustine, respectively.
