= Roberto Santamaría (footballer, born 1985) =

Spanish footballer (born 1985)

Personal information
- Full name: Roberto Santamaría Ciprián
- Date of birth: 27 February 1985 (age 41)
- Place of birth: Pamplona, Spain
- Height: 1.83 m (6 ft 0 in)
- Position: Goalkeeper

Youth career
- Osasuna

Senior career*
| Years | Team | Apps | (Gls) |
| 2004–2006 | Osasuna B | 40 | (0) |
| 2006–2008 | Las Palmas B | 22 | (0) |
| 2008–2010 | Las Palmas | 55 | (0) |
| 2009–2010 | → Málaga (loan) | 0 | (0) |
| 2010–2012 | Girona | 54 | (0) |
| 2012–2014 | Ponferradina | 68 | (0) |
| 2014–2015 | Osasuna | 21 | (0) |
| 2015–2016 | Ponferradina | 33 | (0) |
| 2016–2017 | Mallorca | 24 | (0) |
| 2017–2018 | Reus | 2 | (0) |
| 2018–2019 | Huesca | 22 | (0) |
| 2019–2020 | Rayo Vallecano | 0 | (0) |
| 2020–2021 | Logroñés | 21 | (0) |
| 2021–2022 | Amorebieta | 24 | (0) |
| 2022–2024 | Tudelano | 46 | (0) |
| Total | | 432 | (0) |

International career
| 2002 | Spain U17 | 5 | (0) |
- * Club domestic league appearances and goals

Roberto Santamaría Ciprián (born 27 February 1985) is a Spanish former professional footballer who played as a goalkeeper.

== Club career ==
Born in Pamplona, Navarre, Santamaría was a product of CA Osasuna's youth ranks, and was transferred to UD Las Palmas in summer 2006. In the Canary Islands, he spent his first two seasons with the reserves, making his debut with the first team on 23 February 2008 in a Segunda División match against RC Celta de Vigo in which he saved a penalty kick, helping to a 1–0 home win.

In the 2009 off-season, Santamaría was loaned to Málaga CF. During the campaign, he played as backup to also newly signed Gustavo Munúa, appearing in all of the side's four matches in the Copa del Rey.

On 12 August 2010, after terminating his Las Palmas contract, Santamaría joined Girona FC in the second division, replacing Albert Jorquera who retired earlier in the summer. He continued to compete in that tier the following years, representing SD Ponferradina (two spells), Osasuna, RCD Mallorca, CF Reus Deportiu and SD Huesca.

Santamaría entered Huesca's first season in La Liga as second choice behind Atlético Madrid loanee Axel Werner, and moved further down the depth chart when Serbian Aleksandar Jovanović was signed from Danish club Aarhus Gymnastikforening at the end of August. He was given his debut in the competition against Valencia CF on 23 December 2018 – aged 33 years and 10 months – by manager Francisco Rodríguez after the team had let in 40 goals in 18 competitive fixtures, making six saves in the 2–1 away defeat and being beaten by Cristiano Piccini with the last kick of the game.

On 27 November 2019, Santamaría moved to Rayo Vallecano in division two, agreeing to a deal until the end of the season. The following 1 September, he signed a one-year contract with fellow league team UD Logroñés.

Santamaría signed for second-tier newcomers SD Amorebieta on 13 July 2021.

== Personal life ==
Santamaría's uncle, Roberto Santamaría Calavia, was also a footballer and a goalkeeper. He too represented Osasuna and Málaga, in the 80s/90s.

His brother, Mikel, a defender, was also brought up at Osasuna. In 2022, both siblings signed for CD Tudelano and played together for the first time.

== Career statistics ==
Appearances and goals by club, season and competition
| Club | Season | League | | | National cup | | Total | |
| Club | Season | Division | Apps | Goals | Apps | Goals | Apps | Goals |
|---|---|---|---|---|---|---|---|---|
| Osasuna B | 2004–05 | Segunda Division B | 14 | 0 | — | | 14 | 0 |
| Osasuna B | 2005–06 | Segunda División B | 26 | 0 | — | | 26 | 0 |
| Osasuna B | Total | | 40 | 0 | — | | 40 | 0 |
| Osasuna | 2005–06 | La Liga | 0 | 0 | 0 | 0 | 0 | 0 |
| Las Palmas | 2006–07 | Segunda División | 0 | 0 | 0 | 0 | 0 | 0 |
| Las Palmas | 2007–08 | Segunda División | 16 | 0 | 1 | 0 | 17 | 0 |
| Las Palmas | 2008–09 | Segunda División | 39 | 0 | 0 | 0 | 39 | 0 |
| Las Palmas | Total | | 55 | 0 | 1 | 0 | 56 | 0 |
| Málaga (loan) | 2009–10 | La Liga | 0 | 0 | 4 | 0 | 4 | 0 |
| Girona | 2010–11 | Segunda División | 33 | 0 | 0 | 0 | 33 | 0 |
| Girona | 2011–12 | Segunda División | 21 | 0 | 0 | 0 | 21 | 0 |
| Girona | Total | | 54 | 0 | 0 | 0 | 54 | 0 |
| Ponferradina | 2012–13 | Segunda División | 31 | 0 | 1 | 0 | 32 | 0 |
| Ponferradina | 2013–14 | Segunda División | 37 | 0 | 0 | 0 | 37 | 0 |
| Ponferradina | Total | | 68 | 0 | 1 | 0 | 69 | 0 |
| Osasuna | 2014–15 | Segunda División | 21 | 0 | 1 | 0 | 22 | 0 |
| Ponferradina | 2015–16 | Segunda División | 33 | 0 | 0 | 0 | 33 | 0 |
| Mallorca | 2016–17 | Segunda División | 24 | 0 | 0 | 0 | 24 | 0 |
| Reus | 2017–18 | Segunda División | 2 | 0 | 1 | 0 | 3 | 0 |
| Huesca | 2017–18 | Segunda División | 2 | 0 | — | | 2 | 0 |
| Huesca | 2018–19 | La Liga | 20 | 0 | 0 | 0 | 20 | 0 |
| Huesca | Total | | 22 | 0 | 0 | 0 | 22 | 0 |
| Rayo Vallecano | 2019–20 | Segunda División | 0 | 0 | 0 | 0 | 0 | 0 |
| Logroñés | 2020–21 | Segunda División | 21 | 0 | 0 | 0 | 21 | 0 |
| Amorebieta | 2021–22 | Segunda División | 24 | 0 | 0 | 0 | 24 | 0 |
| Tudelano | 2022–23 | Segunda Federación | 30 | 0 | 2 | 0 | 32 | 0 |
| Tudelano | 2023–24 | Segunda Federación | 16 | 0 | — | | 16 | 0 |
| Tudelano | Total | | 46 | 0 | 2 | 0 | 48 | 0 |
| Career total | | | 410 | 0 | 10 | 0 | 420 | 0 |
