= Carlo Maciachini =

Italian architect and restorer

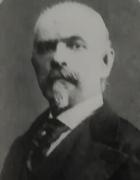
Carlo Maciachini

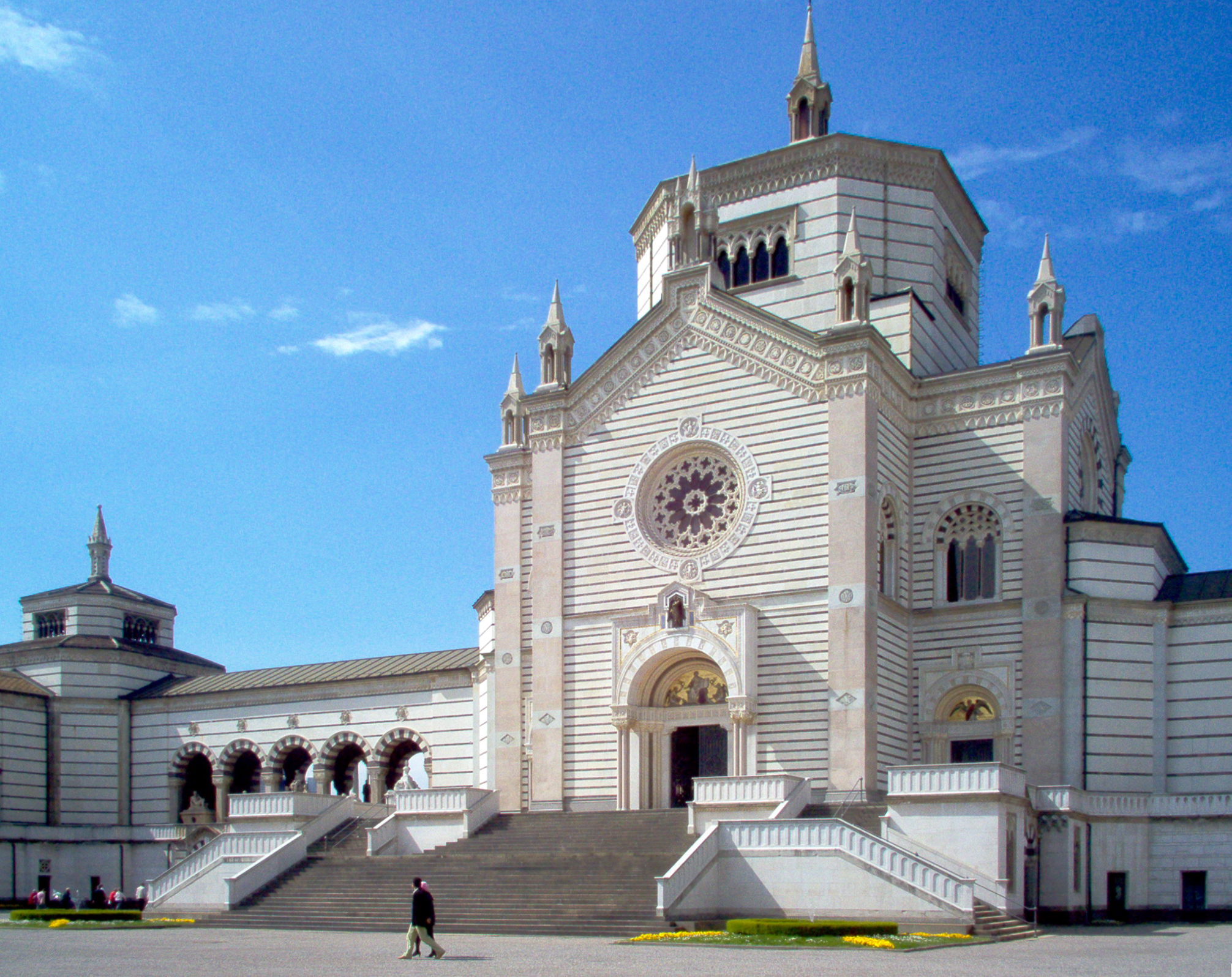
The "Famedio", core building and entrance to Milan's Monumental Cemetery (1866)

Carlo Francesco Maciachini (Italian pronunciation: [ˈkarlo franˈtʃesko matʃaˈkiːni]; sometimes spelled Maciacchini; 2 April 1818 – 10 June 1899) was an Italian architect and restorer. Born near Varese, he studied in Milan, where he also realized some of his most important works, most notably the Monumental Cemetery (1866). Other notable works of Maciachini are restorations of historic churches in several cities of northern Italy.

Along with Camillo Boito, Luca Beltrami, and Luigi Broggi, Maciachini is one of the prominent representatives of the eclectic period of Milanese architecture, sometimes referred to as "Milanese Eclecticism" (approx. 1860–1920).

== Biography ==
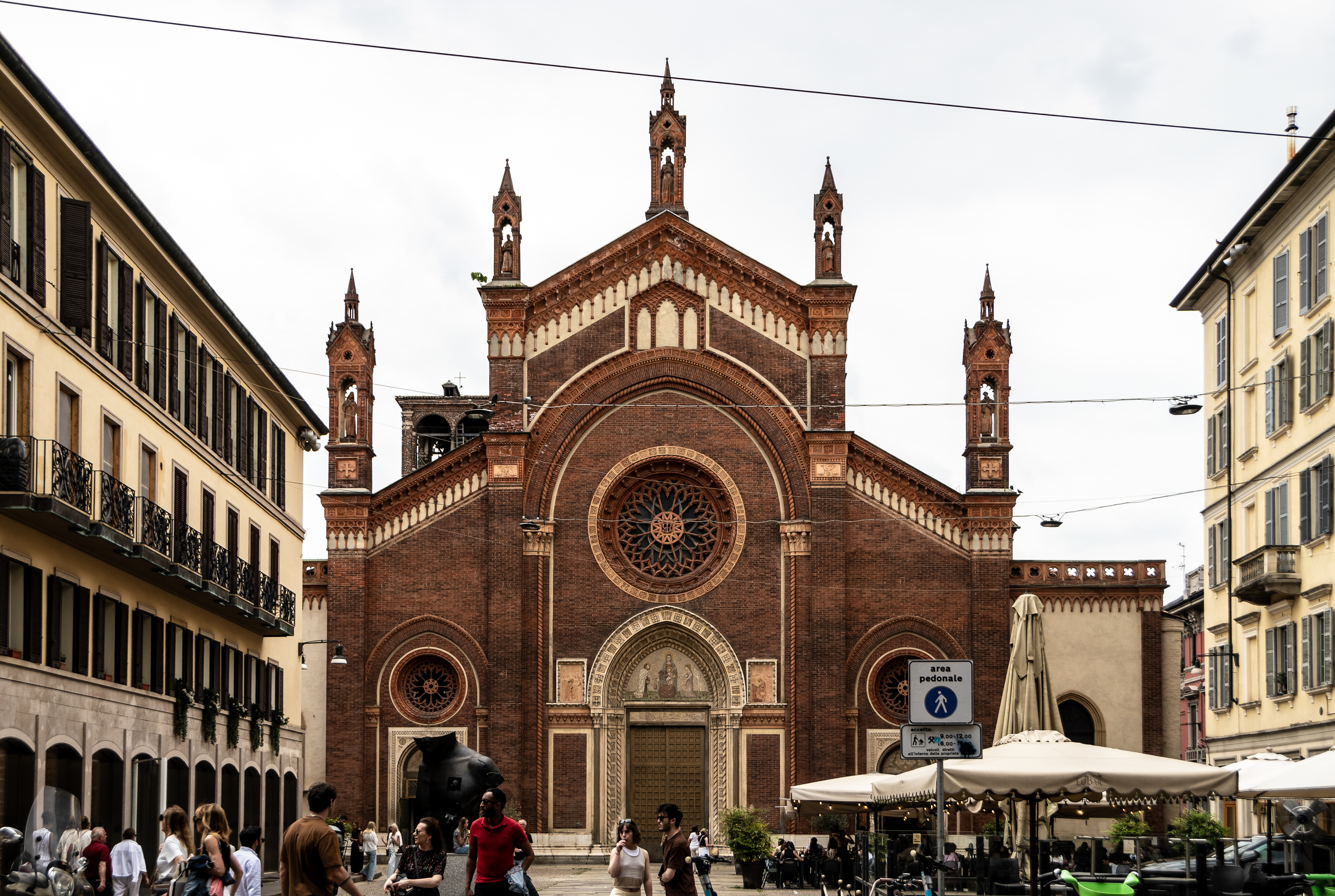
The façade of Santa Maria del Carmine, Milan (1880)

Maciachini was born in Induno Olona, in the Province of Varese (Lombardy), to a farmers family. As a young boy, he proved to be a talented wood carver, working as an apprentice in local woodworking shops. At the age of 20, he moved to Milan to become an art student at the Brera Academy, where eventually graduated in architecture, at the same time earning a great popularity in the Milanese high society as a carver and decorator. His first major work as an architect was the realization of the Saint Spyridon Church in Trieste for the Serbian Orthodox community. A few years later he submitted his proposal for the design of the new Monumental Cemetery of Milan ("Cimitero Monumentale di Milano"), and was chosen by the city authorities for the task. The cemetery was completed in 1866, and is widely recognized as Maciachini's prominent achievement.

Thereafter, Maciachini worked on a number of other designs (mostly restorations of decayed religious buildings) in Milan and other areas of Northern Italy, including several cities in Lombardy, Veneto, and Friuli-Venezia Giulia. He would also sporadically return to sculpture and carving; for example, he realized the Corinthian capitals of the church of Bodio, as well as the pulpits of the Basilica of San Vittore in Varese.

Maciachini was also involved in a resounding failure with his design of the dome of the Cathedral of Pavia, which was completed in 1885 and partially collapsed in that same year. The cathedral had to remain closed for over seven years because pieces of marble would occasionally fall from the fractured dome. The dome is still in place, but its maintenance is difficult and costly because of the defective design.

Maciachini died in Varese in 1899, and was buried in the Monumental Cemetery of Milan. To honour his contributions to the architecture of Milan, a large square of the city, Piazzale Carlo Maciachini, has been named after him.

== Style ==
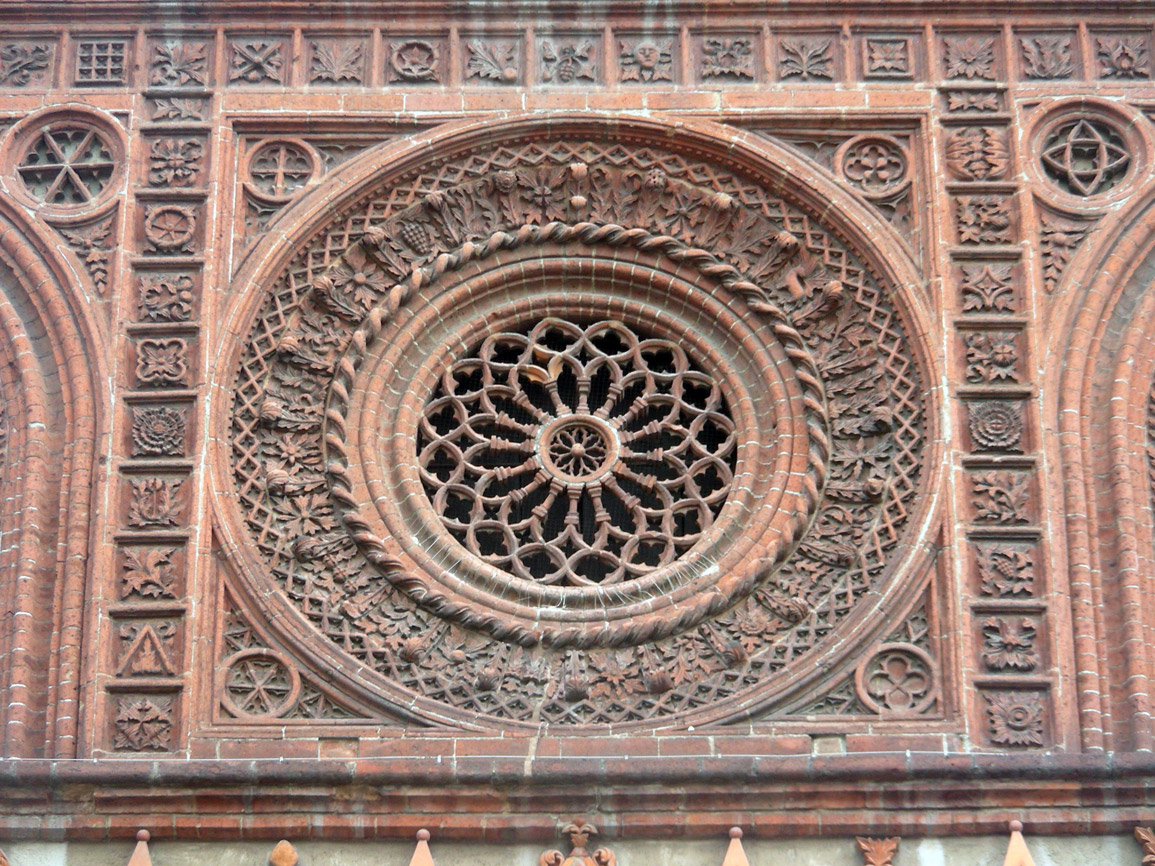
Geometric symbols on the facade of Santa Maria in Strada (Monza)

Especially in the restoration of old buildings, Maciachini developed a personal and appreciated style, which was both scientific and eclectic. He would first try to identify the original structure of the buildings he was restoring through a study of any available documentation, to recreate them as faithfully as possible; but then, when precise documentation wasn't available, he would integrate the design, creatively borrowing features from other buildings of the same historical period and architectural style.

A recurring theme in Maciachini's style is the extensive use of dense patterns of geometric shapes and symbols in the decoration of facades, rose windows, and other architectural elements. It has been noted that, despite working on religious buildings, Maciachini made very little use of Christian symbols: for example, the chapels in the Famedio (the core building of the Monumental Cemetery) did not include any Cross symbol in Maciachini's original design. On the other hand, stars of David, pentagrams, (left-facing) swastikas, triskelions, and other non-Christian symbols are found in many of Maciachini's facades and architectures. This predilection for "pagan" (possibly esoteric) symbols has aroused a number of theories alleging that Maciachini was an affiliate of some sort of secret organisation, such as a Freemasonry society.

== Notable works ==
- San Spiridione (Trieste, 1859)
- Cimitero Monumentale di Milano (Milan, 1866)
- Facade of Santa Maria in Strada (Monza, 1870)
- Facade of San Simpliciano (Milan, 1870)
- Facade of the San Marco (Milan, 1871)
- Facade of Santa Maria del Carmine (Milan, 1880)
- Facade of the Duomo di Voghera (Voghera, 1881)
- Restoration and dome of Santa Maria Assunta (Soncino, 1883–1888)
- Dome of the Pavia Cathedral (Pavia, 1885)
- Facade of Santa Maria di Piazza(Busto Arsizio (1886-1889)

== Gallery ==
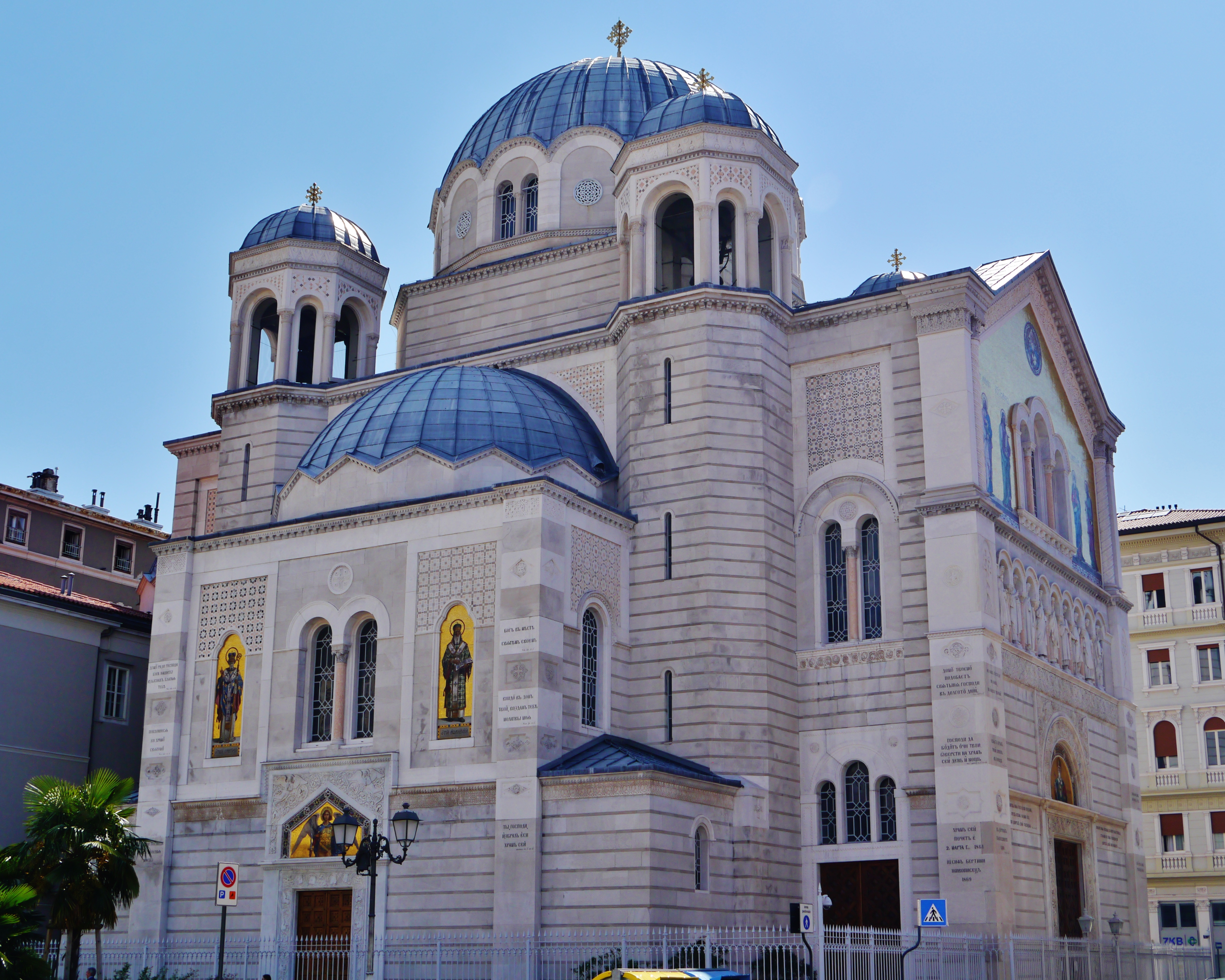
San Spiridione, Trieste

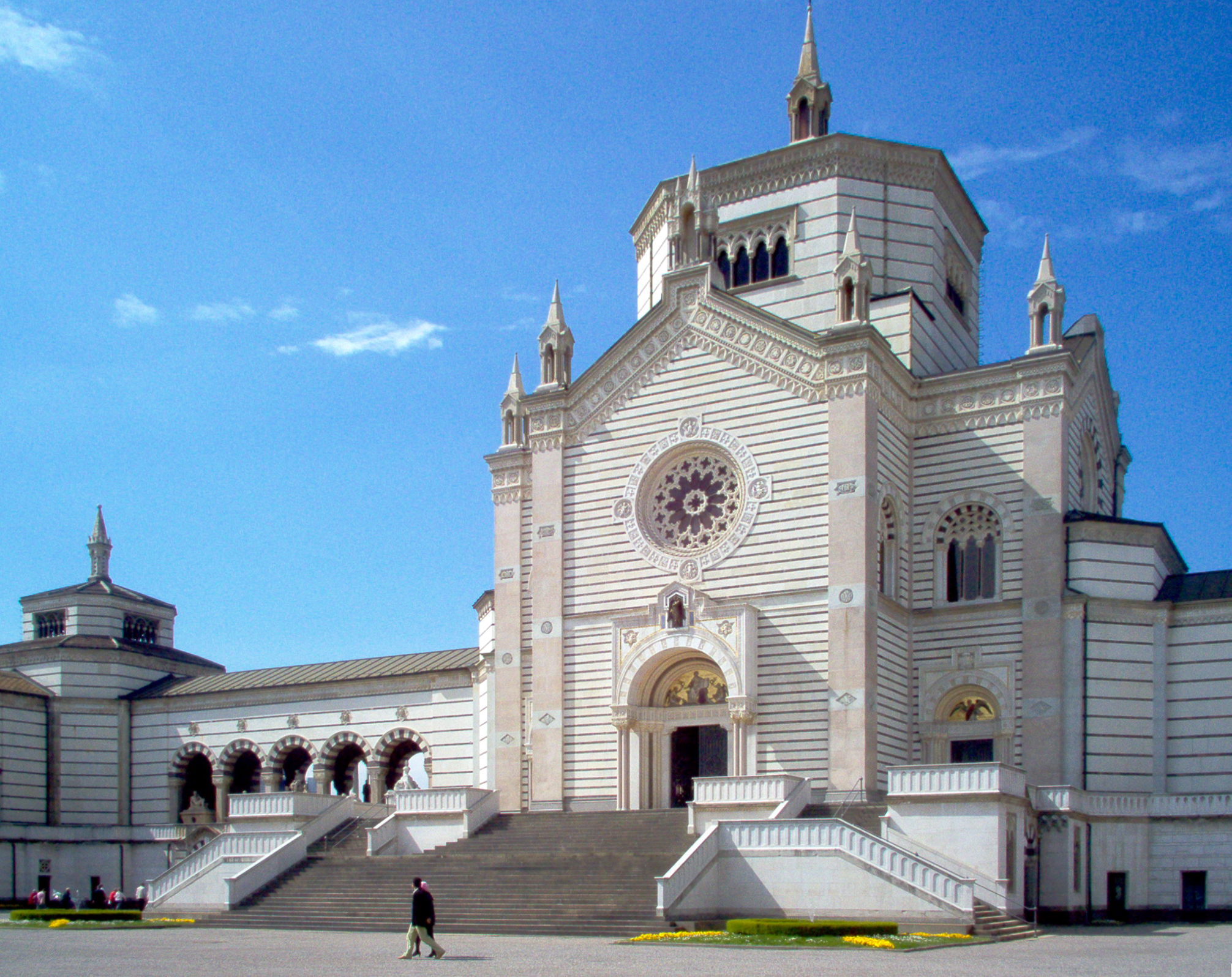
Cimitero Monumentale, Milan

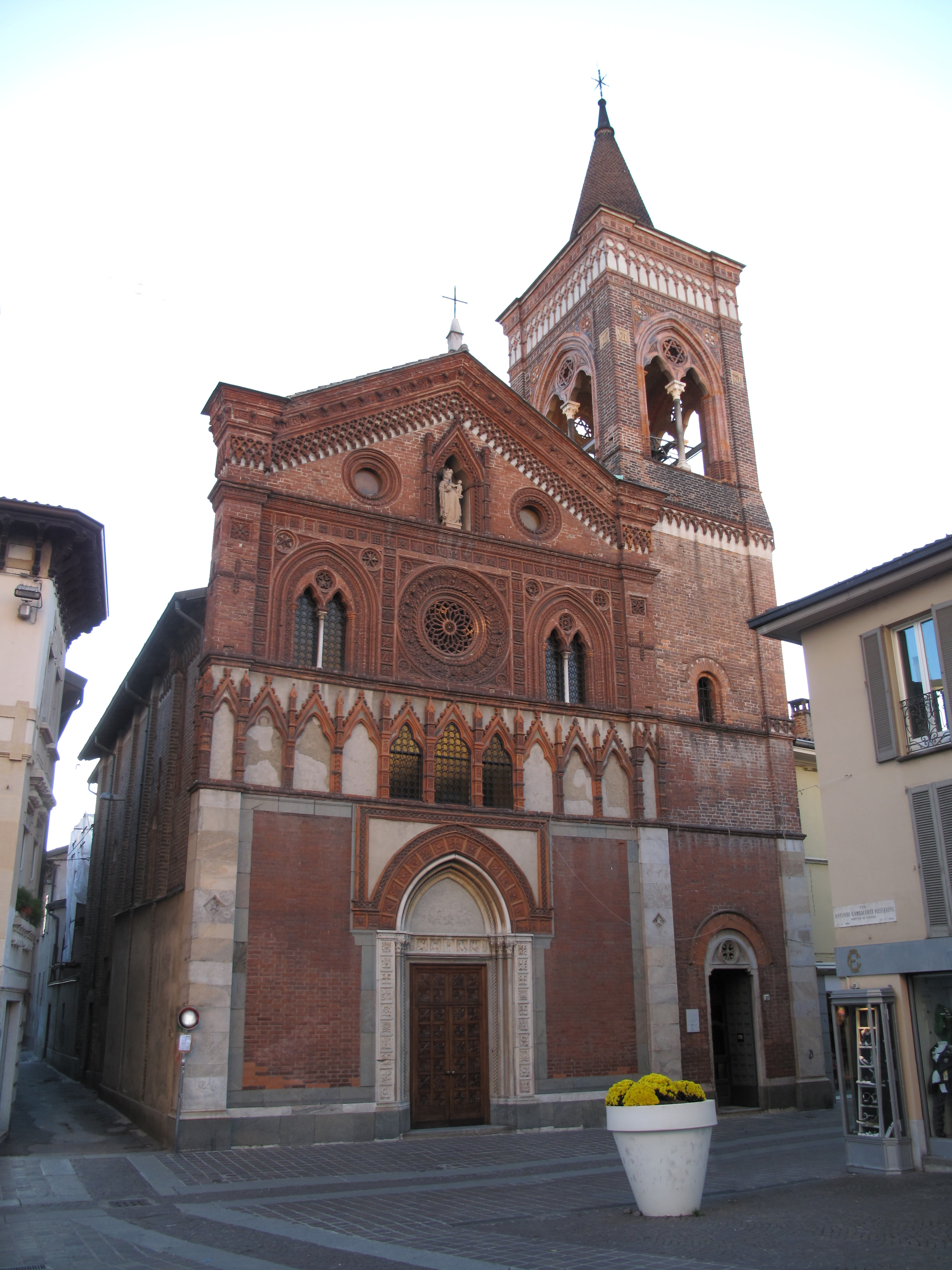
Santa Maria in Strada, Monza

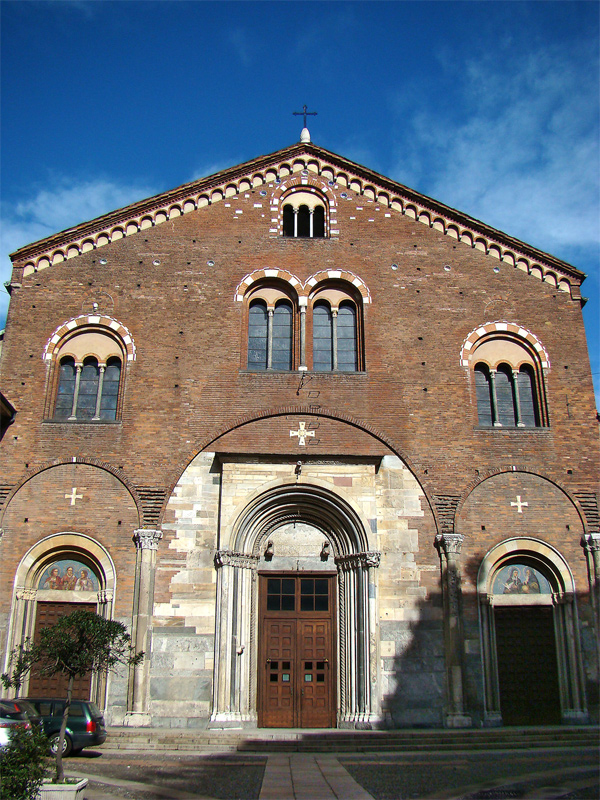
San Simpliciano, Milan

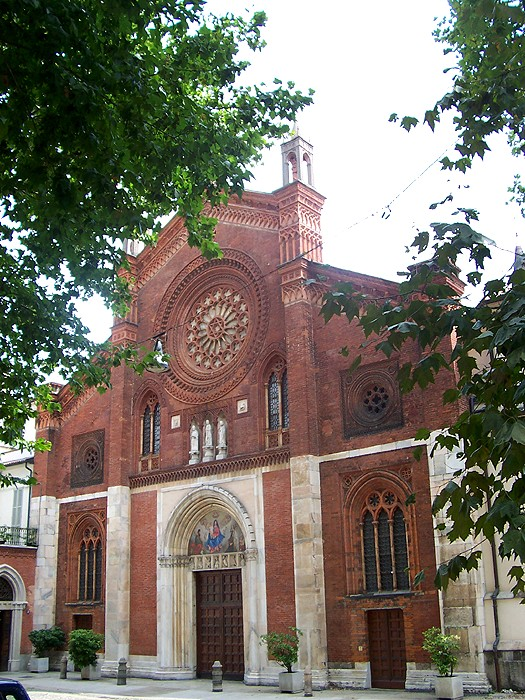
San Marco, Milan

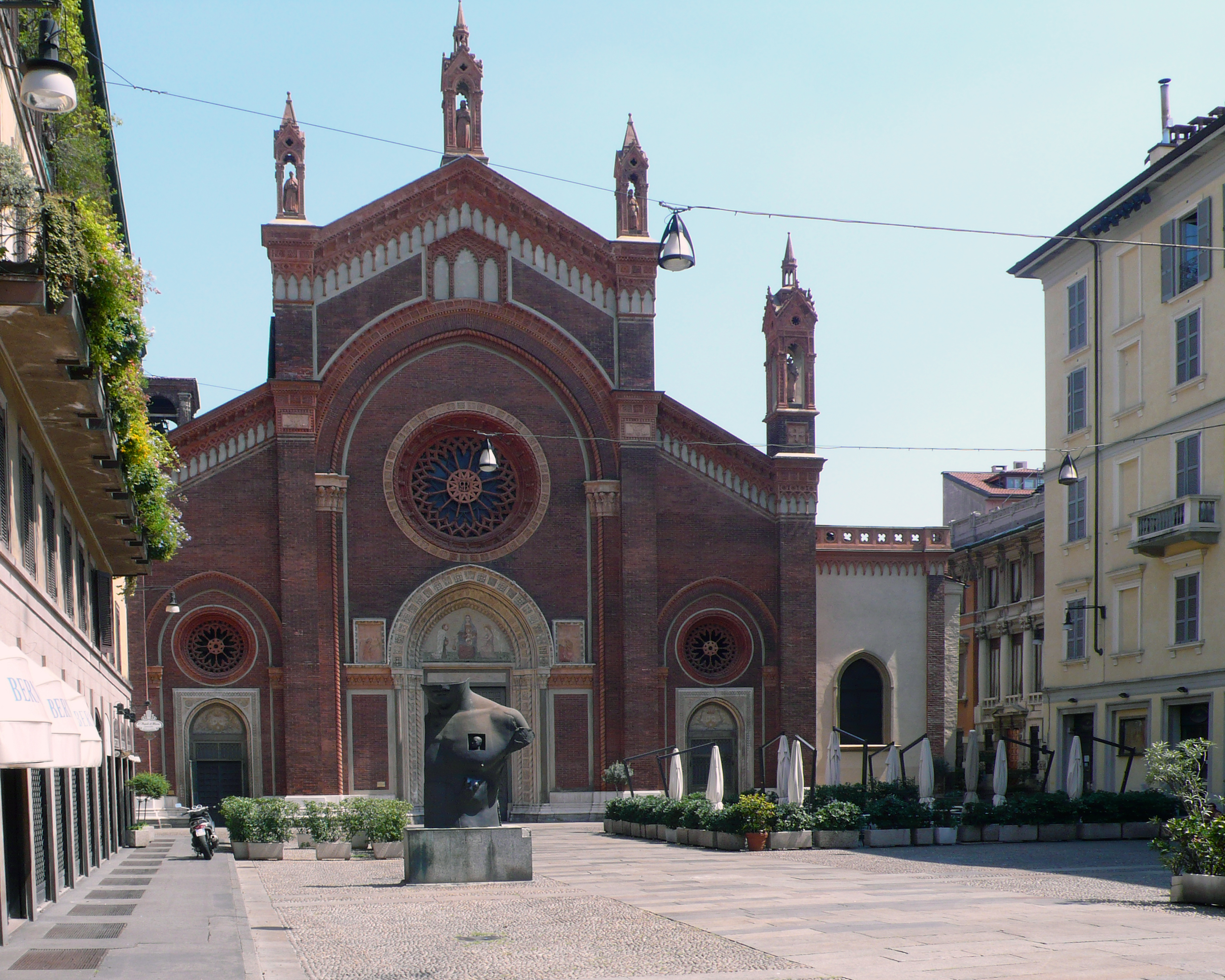
Santa Maria del Carmine, Milan

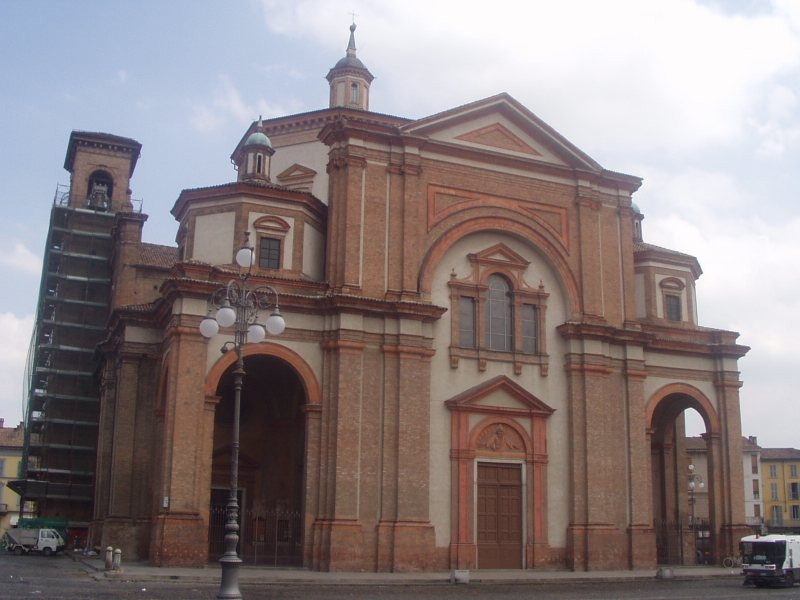
Voghera Cathedral, Voghera

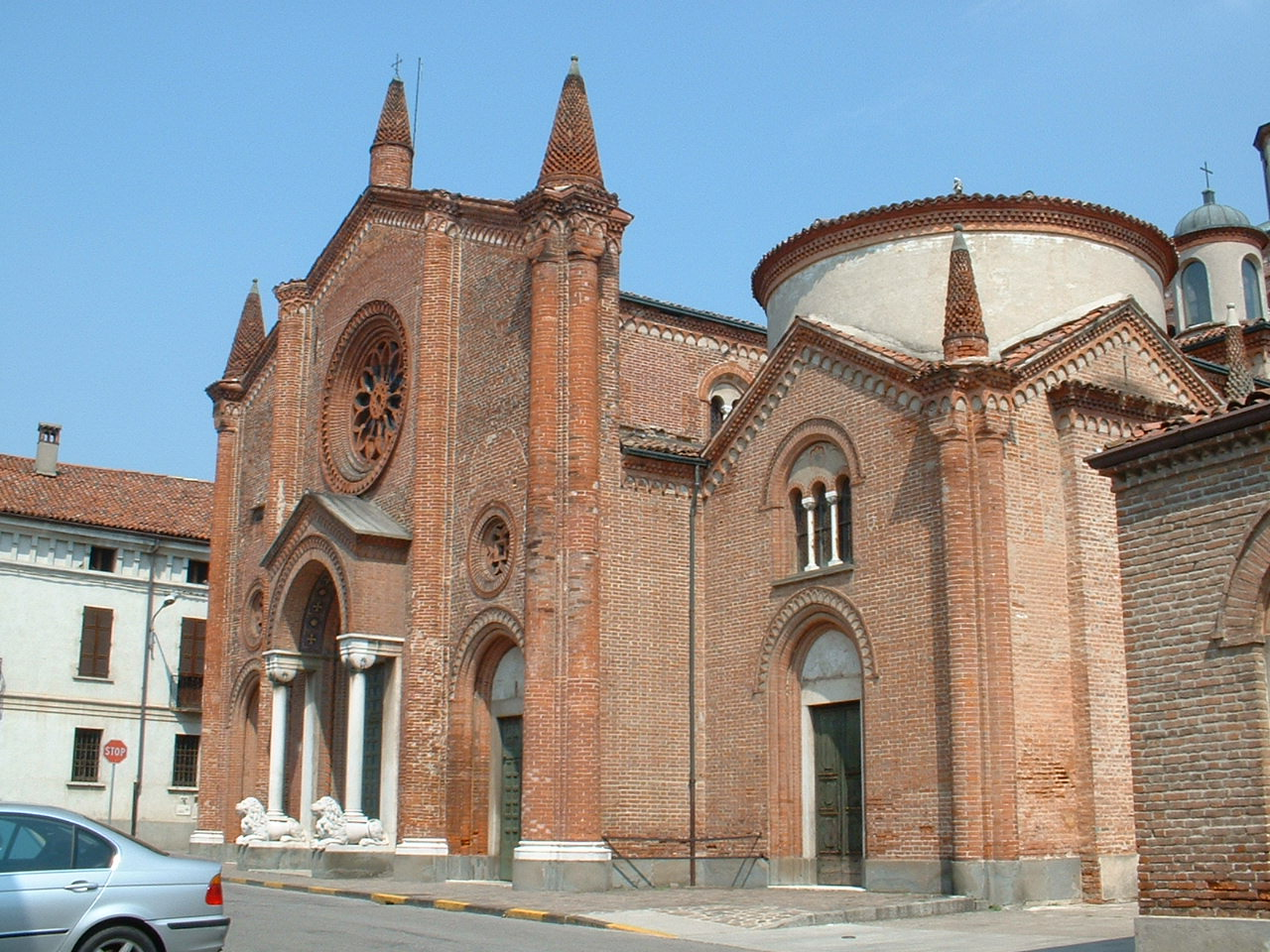
Santa Maria Assunta, Soncino
