= Santa María, Misiones =

Santa María (Misiones)
- Municipality and village
- Motto: Capilla y Habitaciones de los sacerdotes.jpg
- Location within Misiones Province Location within Argentina
- Country: Argentina
- Province: Misiones Province

Government
  - Intendant: Mario Norberto Rucmling
- Time zone: UTC−3 (ART)

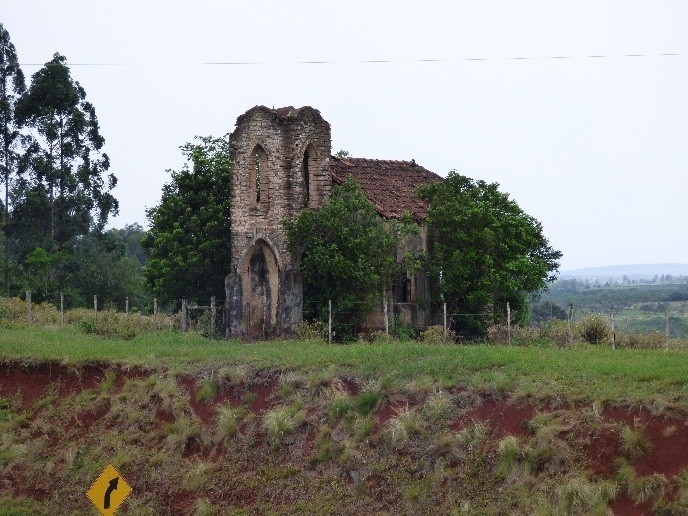
The San Roque Chapel in La Corita, near Colonia Santa María in Misiones, Argentina

Santa María (Misiones) is a village and municipality in Misiones Province in north-eastern Argentina.
