= Santa Maria Airport =

Santa Maria Airport may refer to:

- Santa Maria Airport (Azores), on Santa Maria Island in the Azores (IATA: SMA, ICAO: LPAZ)
- Santa Maria Airport (Peru), in Santa María District, Lima Region, Peru (IATA: SMG, ICAO: SPMR)
- Santa Maria Airport (Rio Grande do Sul), in Santa Maria, Rio Grande do Sul, Brazil (IATA: RIA, ICAO: SBSM)
- Santa Maria Airport (Sergipe), in Aracaju, Sergipe, Brazil (IATA: AJU, ICAO: SBAR)
- Santa Maria Public Airport, in Santa Maria, California, United States (IATA: SMX, ICAO: KSMX)
- Santa Maria Municipal Airport, an alternative name for Hancock Field, a former airport and military airfield in California

== Also ==
- Estância Santa Maria Airport, Campo Grande, Mato Grosso do Sul, Brazil (ICAO: SSKG)
- Santa Maria da Vitória Airport, in Santa Maria da Vitória, Bahia, Brazil (ICAO: SNVD)
- Santa Maria do Suaçuí Airport, in Santa Maria do Suaçuí, Minas Gerais, Brazil (ICAO: SNSI)
