= Santa María Department =

Santa María Department may refer to:

- Santa María Department, Catamarca, in Argentina
- Santa María Department, Córdoba, in Argentina
