= Santa Maria del Carmine, Pavia =

Church in Pavia, Lombardy, Italy, of Lombard Gothic architecture

Coordinates: 45°11′14″N 9°9′11″E

Church of Our Lady of Mount Carmel
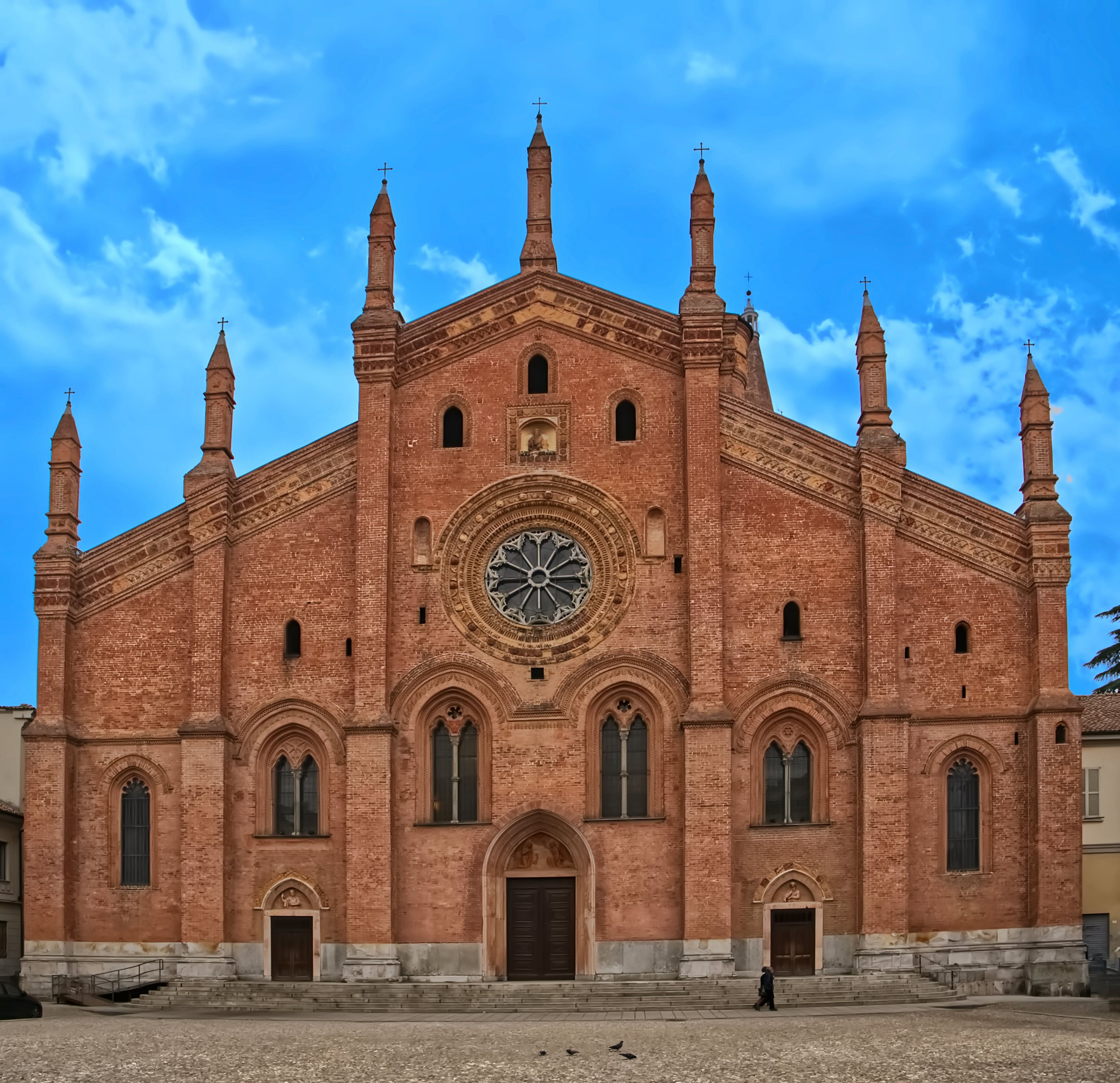
- Façade.

Religion
- Affiliation: Catholic
- Province: Pavia
- Year consecrated: 1374
- Status: Active

Location
- Location: Pavia, Italy
- Interactive map of Church of Our Lady of Mount Carmel

Architecture
- Type: Church
- Style: Gothic
- Completed: 1490

Santa Maria del Carmine is a church in Pavia, Lombardy, northern Italy, considered amongst the best examples of Lombard Gothic architecture. It was begun in 1374 by Gian Galeazzo Visconti, Duke of Milan, on a project attributed to Bernardo da Venezia. The construction followed a slow pace, and was restarted in 1432, being finished in 1461.

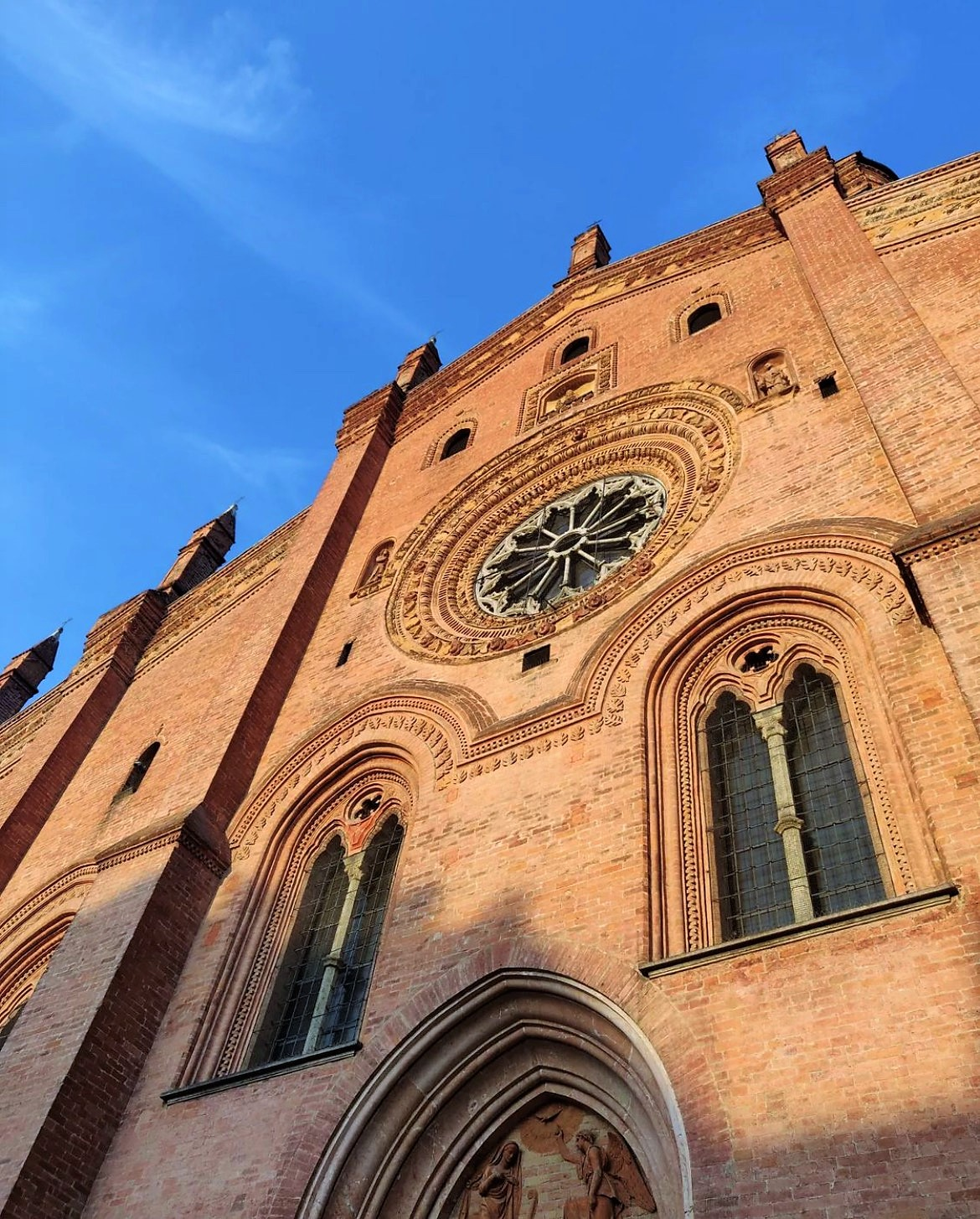
Façade

== History ==
In 1298 the Carmelites built their first church in Pavia in the northern part of the city. The church, dedicated to Santa Maria del Carmine, was demolished by Galeazzo II Visconti in 1364 because it was located in the area where the construction site of Visconti Castle was developing. Galeazzo II Visconti, however, restored the Carmelites by giving them the church of Santi Faustino e Giovita (documented at least since 1105) and financing the construction of the new church. Starting from 1373 the Carmelites started the construction of the new church which lasted for over a century. In 1390 Gian Galeazzo donated a large donation for the construction of the church, however, again in the same years, the beginning of the construction of the Certosa di Pavia caused a slowdown in the works, because many workers were attracted to the new construction site. In 1397 Francesco Barbarava, treasurer of Gian Galeazzo Visconti, chose the high altar of the church as a burial place for his family and donated large sums of money for the construction of the church. Despite the rich donation, work continued rather slowly in the 15th century. The church was completed in 1461, the facade only in 1490. The 16 side chapels that flank the naves were built between 1450 and 1498, some chapels were financed by the aristocratic families of Pavia, two by the guilds of wool workers and butchers. In 1509 the Chapel of Saint Sebastian was chosen as a burial place by students of the University of Pavia from France, Flanders and German-speaking countries. The convent was suppressed in 1799 and the church was transformed into a parish. In 1811, the relics of the Blessed Bernardine of Feltre, which were initially kept in the monastery of San Giacomo della Vernavola in Pavia, were brought to the church.

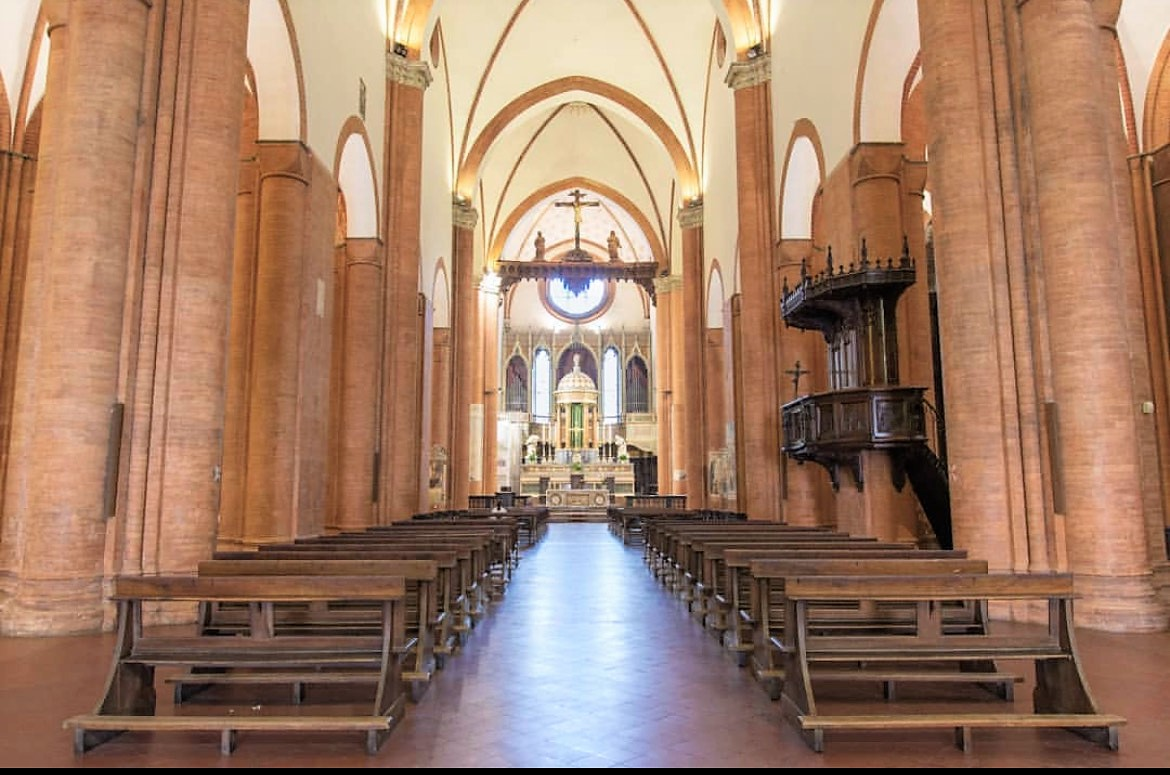
Interior.

== Architecture ==
The church has an imposing façade commanding the square with the same name; the slender forms betray a residual Romanesque influence, although the decorations are undoubutably of Lombard Gothic style. The façade is divided into five vertical compartments by six pilasters surmounted by spires. The three central sectors have a portal each, remade by Giuseppe Marchesi in 1854. Over the portals are four large ogival mullioned windows and an elaborated rose window in brickwork.

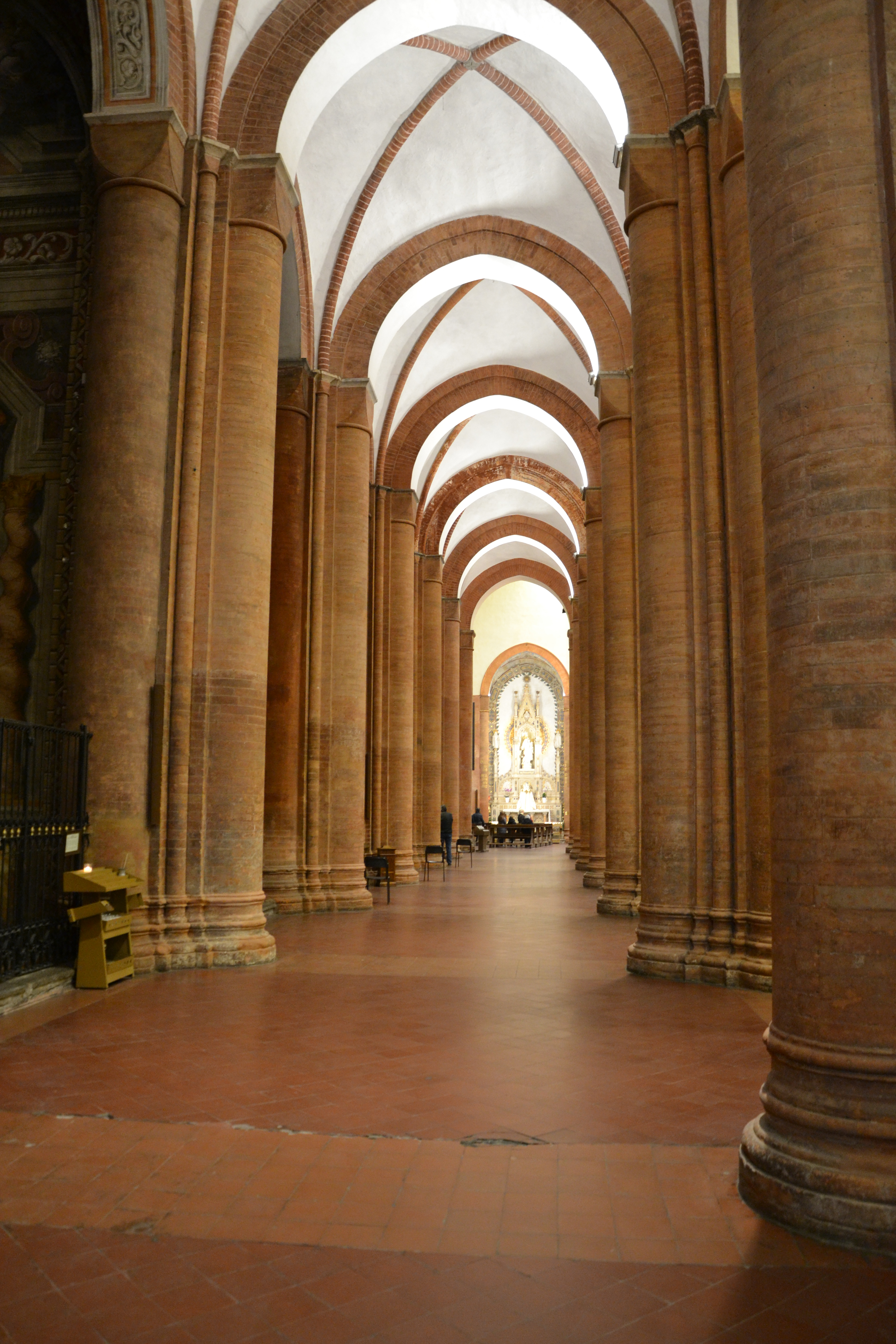
One of the nave.

The central part is occupied by a very elaborate terracotta rose window. The central rose window has a large decorated frame in terracotta which contains, in the outermost part, heads of angels. The upper profile is decorated with a frieze and seven square pinnacles. On the sides of the rose window there are two niches that house the statues of the archangel Gabriel and the Virgin of the Annunciation. Above the rose window, a niche surrounded by a square frame contains a terracotta bas-relief depicting the Eternal Father. These statues are stylistically attributable to the ambit of Giovanni Antonio Amadeo.

The church has a rectangular plan within which there is a Latin cross plan with three naves flanked by square chapels obtained from the remodeling of the outermost aisles (originally the layout had five naves). The plan dimensions are considerable: almost 80 meters long by 40 wide. The large size of the church is linked to belonging to the Carmelites, an order of preaching friars. The proportions of the construction are based on the module ad quadratum, which involves the use of a single square base element which is repeated in width, length and height. The central nave, twice the height of the smaller ones, is subdivided into four square bays which, in the side aisles, are in turn subdivided into two square bells open on two chapels, always with a square plan. The vaults are cross arched and the ribs that divide the structure of the vaults are in terracotta to form a chromatic element in contrast with the light plaster. The pillars also feature a chromatic combination with terracotta and gray Angera stone.

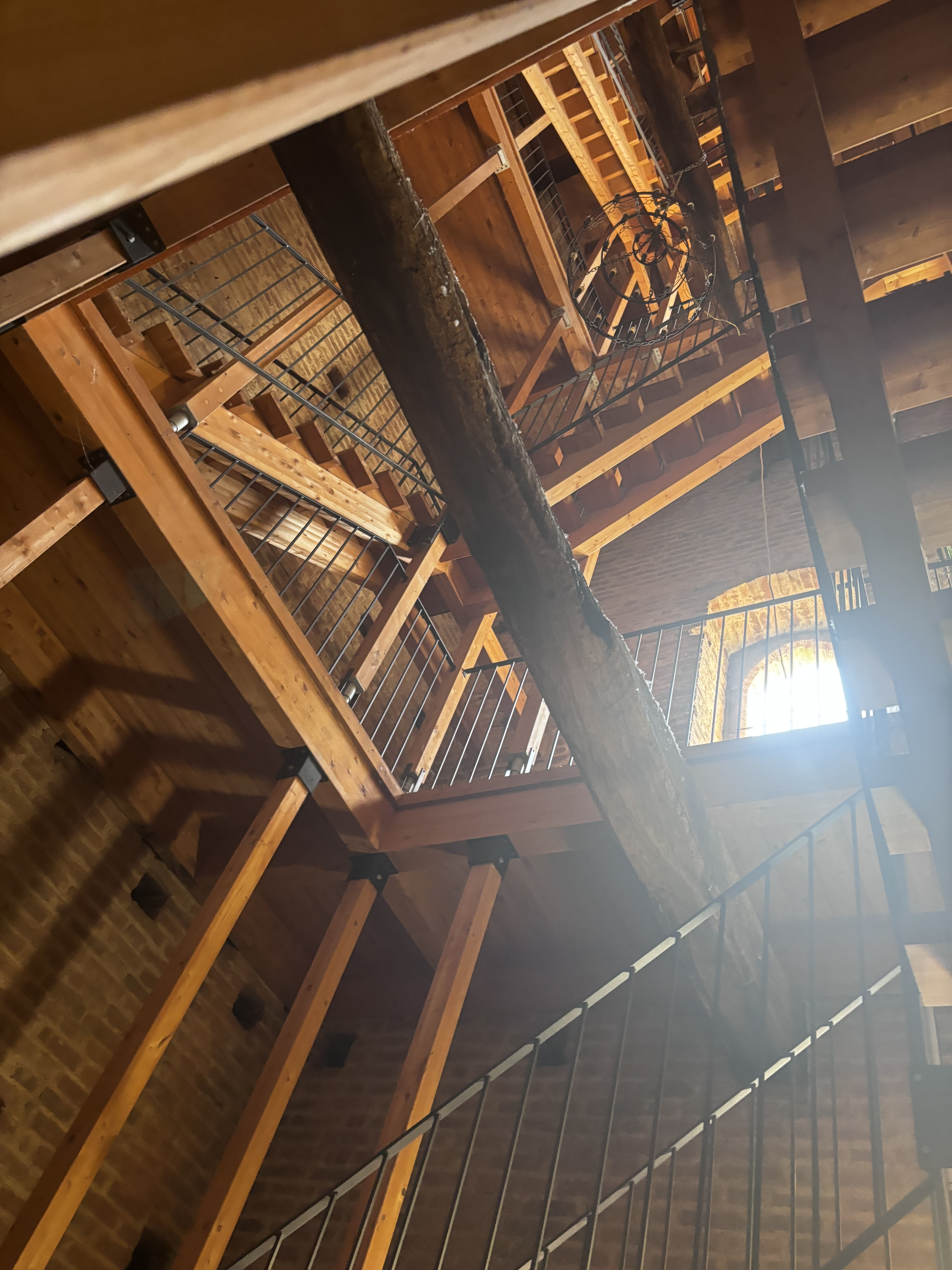
Interior of the bell tower

The bell tower, dating to c. 1450, it stands elegantly over the city; it is adorned with numerous friezes and characterized by a mullioned window adorned with marble columns. With its 75 m high it is the highest bell tower in Pavia.

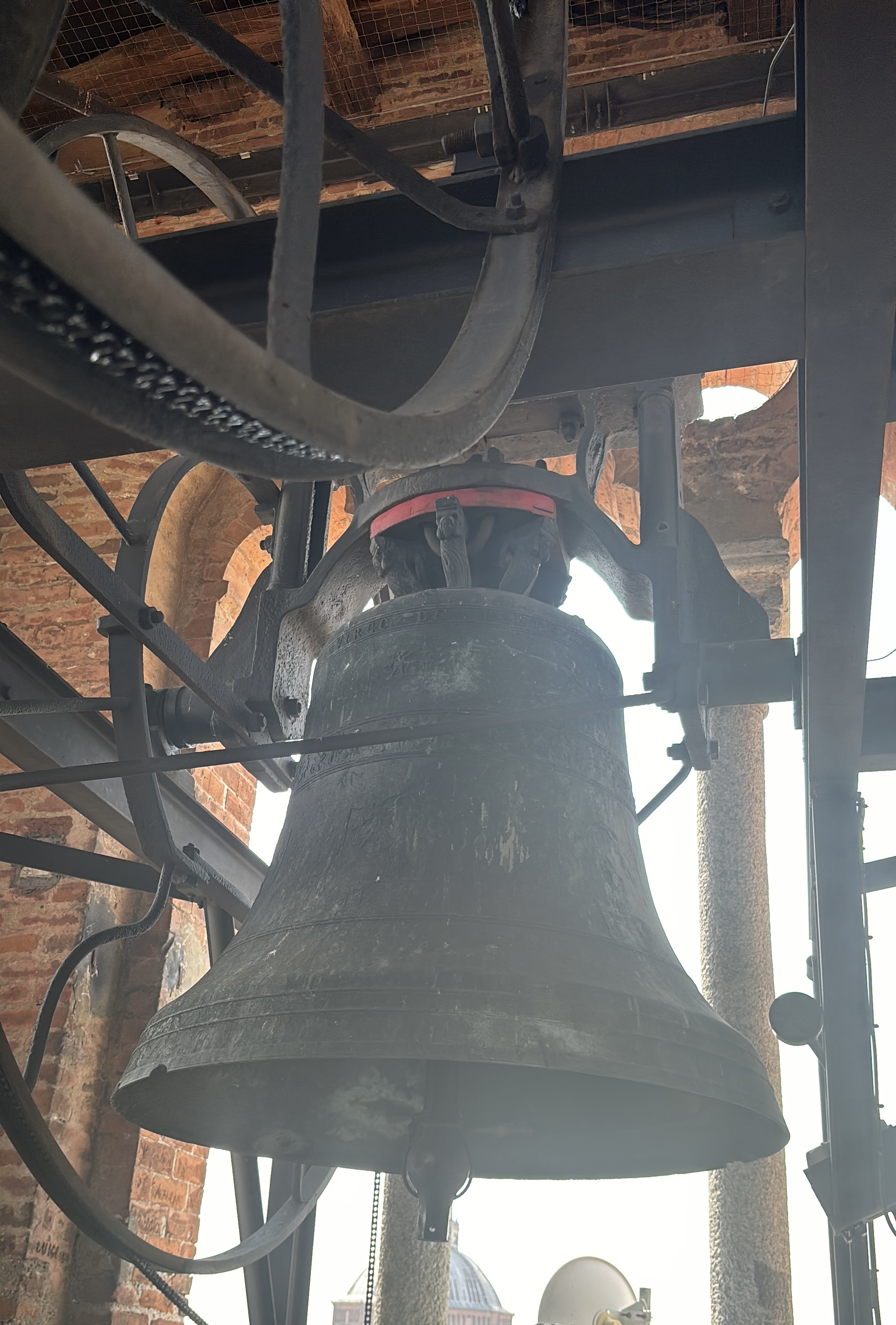
A bell in the bell tower

== Interior ==
The interior is characterized by an inspiring penumbra, and is on the Latin cross plan with a nave and numerous lateral chapels with frescoes and paintings. The most important are:

- 2nd Chapel, with a fresco by Vincenzo Foppa (1462)
- 4th Chapel, with a canvas of the Guardian Angel by Sebastiano Ricci (1694)
- 5th Chapel, with an Assumption by Bernardo Cane and a canvas with "St. Augustine writes on the heart of Maria Maddalena de 'Pazzi" by Pietro Maggi
- 6th Chapel, with an altarpiece of St. Anne and the Wool Making Craft (by Guglielmo Caccia) and with the "Vision of Pope Honorius III" by Filippo Abbiati
- 7th Chapel, housing a Gothic altarpiece donated by Pius X, and 15th century polyptych with Madonna and Saints (by Bernardino da Cotignola).

In the apse wall, above the altar there is a polychrome stained glass window depicting the Madonna enthroned with the Child, made between 1482 and 1489.

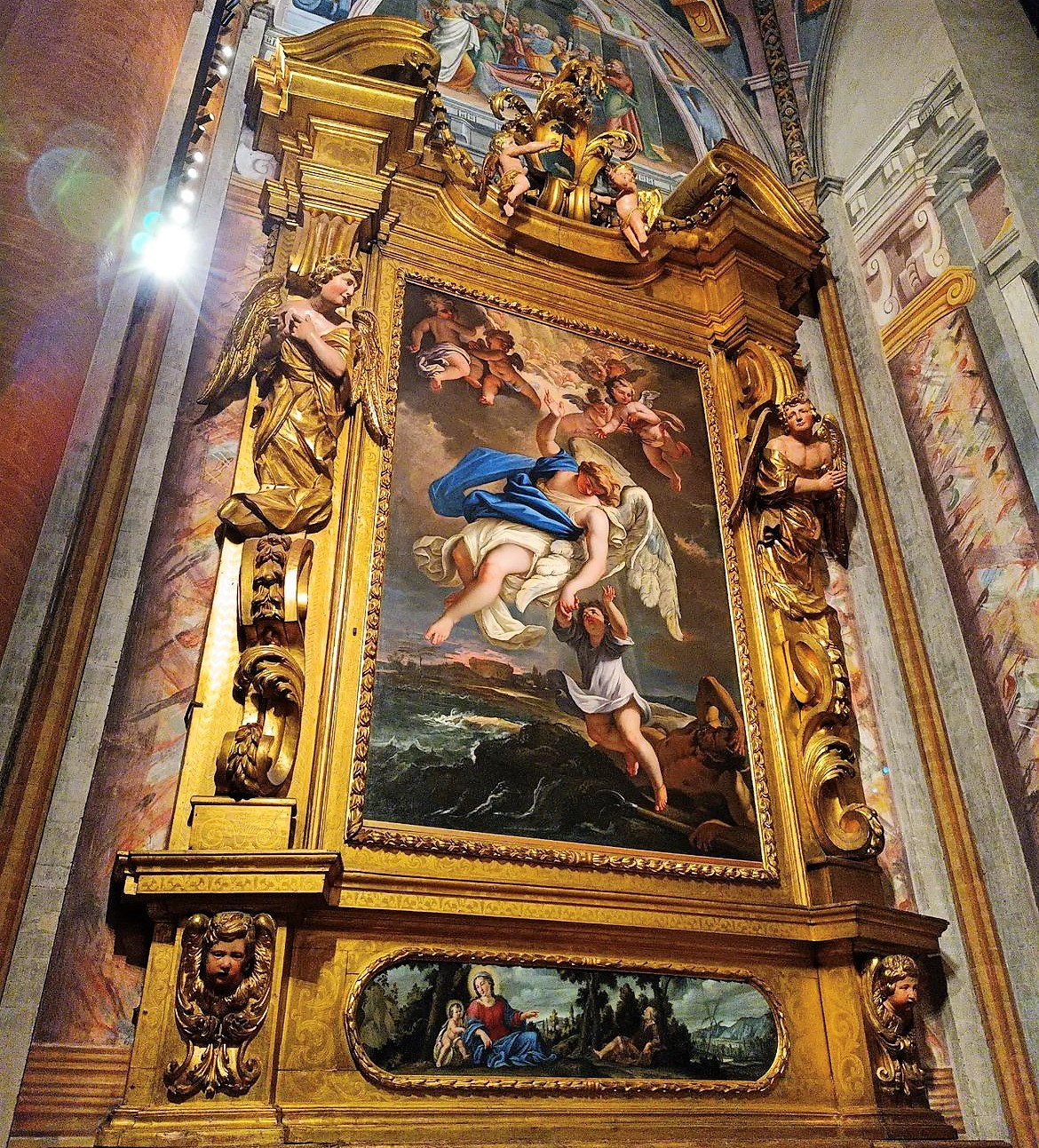
Sebastiano Ricci, Guardian Angel, 1694.

The cartoon with the Madonna has been attributed to Vincenzo Foppa. The fifteenth-century tile is the only one left of the original stained-glass window that had been re-glazed in 1827. During the restoration in 1989, the fifteenth-century tile, placed in the center, with the Madonna enthroned and the Child was inserted in a new frame, a rhombus electric blue with rounded corners in turn inscribed in the large circle of the rose window with modern geometric motifs. Above the altar, the triumphal arch of the church is enriched by a large wooden iconostasis with Jesus crucified and, at its sides, the Madonna and San Giovanni Evangelista, the work of Giovanni Battista Trucazzano, built between 1638 and 1645.

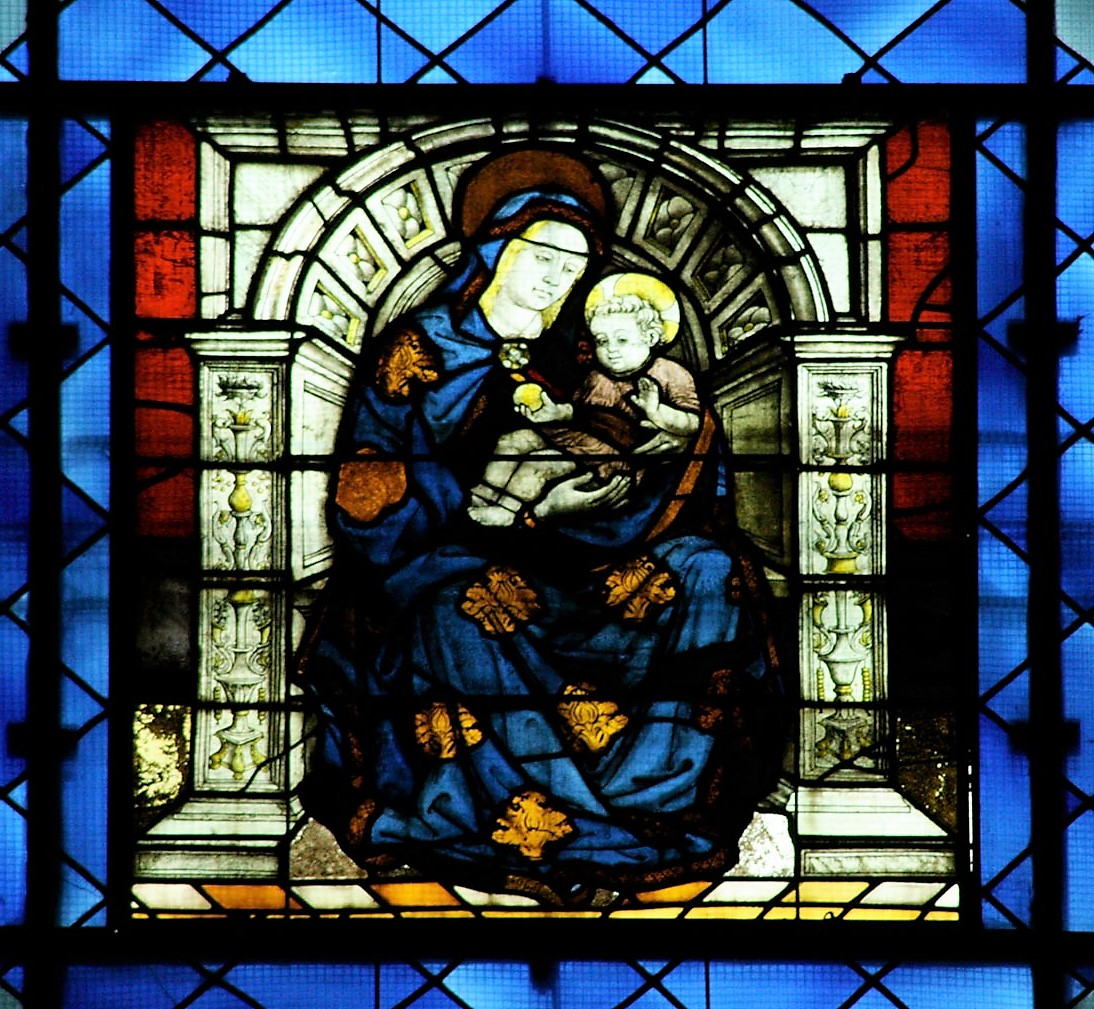
Vincenzo Foppa, polychrome stained glass window depicting the Madonna enthroned with the Child, 1482 -1489

In the presbytery there is the high altar in white marble, which was renovated in 1832 in the classicist style. Behind the altar, on a neo-Gothic balcony, is the organ, which was created in 1836 by the Lingiardi brothers and rebuilt in 1872. In the transept on the left wall there are numerous and precious votive frescoes attributed to the circle of Michelino da Besozzo and dated between the first and fourth decade of the fifteenth century, and an altarpiece by Bernardino Lanzani with the Child Jesus between the Madonna, the SS. Anna, Joachim, John the Evangelist, signed and dated (1515).

On the right side wall of the transept there is the facade, rich in Baroque stuccoes, of the sacristy (1576), built by Count Camillo Pietra. Around the portal that gives access to the room there are symmetrical niches with St. Francis with the stigmata and John the Baptist, while the niche in the tympanum houses the Virgin and Child.

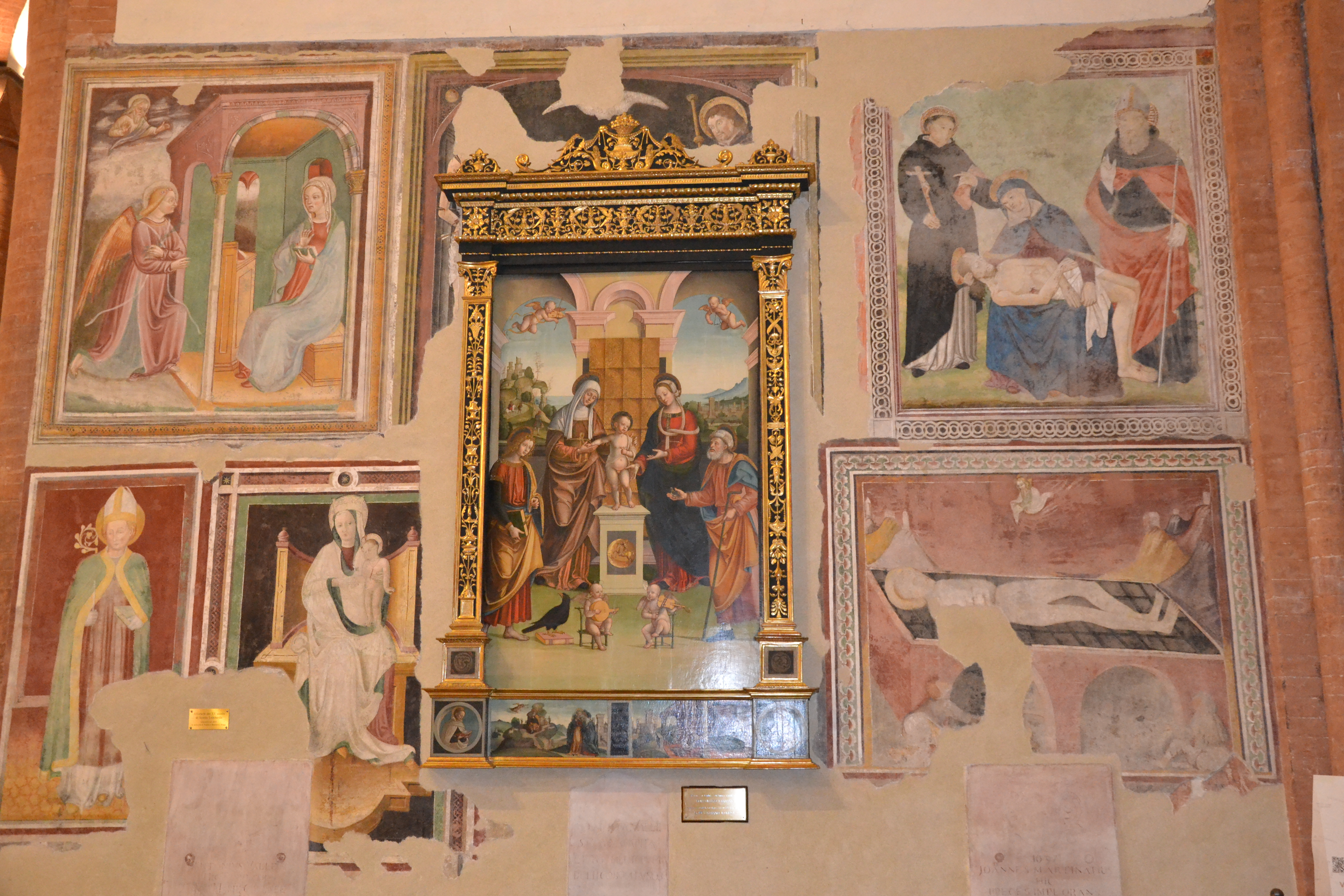
altarpiece by Bernardino Lanzani (1515) and votive frescoes attributed to the circle of Michelino da Besozzo, first half of the 15th century

In the counter-façade there is a painting from the second half of the fifteenth century depicting Our Lady of Graces between Saint Julius of Novara and Saint Anthony the Great within a sixteenth-century architectural frame in carved gilded wood. Popular devotion attributed miraculous powers to the painting and anecdotes and legends were born around it. To the right of the painting there is a fresco (dating back to the second half of the sixteenth century) enclosed in a painted gilded frame that incorporates the wooden cave which has five depictions of the miracles that this Madonna would have performed. Among these is the rescue from a shipwreck in the Ticino in flood.

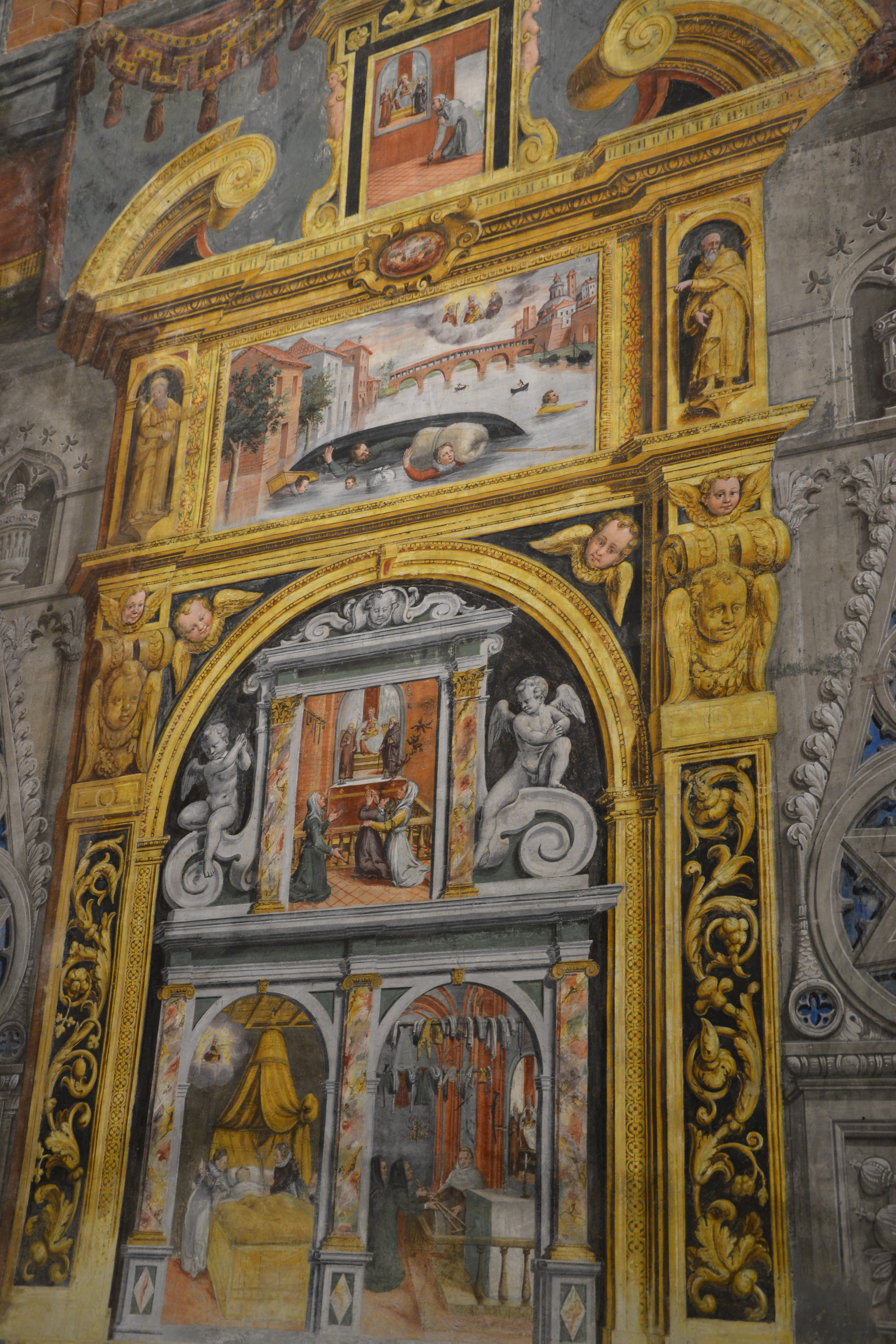
Ex votes on the counter-façade, second half of the 16th century
