= Santamaria (footballer) =

Portuguese footballer

Personal information
- Full name: Ricardo Jorge Oliveira Ribeiro Duarte
- Date of birth: 11 February 1982 (age 44)
- Place of birth: Pontinha, Portugal
- Height: 1.82 m (6 ft 0 in)
- Position: Centre-back

Youth career
- 1990–1992: UDR Santa Maria
- 1992–2000: Sporting CP

Senior career*
Years	Team	Apps	(Gls)
1999–2006	Sporting CP	3	(0)
2000–2004	Sporting CP B	70	(2)
2002–2003	→ Marco (loan)	27	(1)
2004–2006	→ Estrela Amadora (loan)	42	(2)
2006–2007	Olhanense	17	(0)
2007–2009	Ponferradina	24	(0)
2009–2010	Pinhalnovense	17	(0)
2010–2011	AEP	24	(1)
2011–2013	Alki Larnaca	43	(0)
2013–2014	Pinhalnovense	20	(0)
2014–2016	Lourinhanense	47	(2)
2016–2020	Alta de Lisboa	32	(1)
Total		366	(9)

International career
2001–2002	Portugal U20	8	(0)
2002–2003	Portugal U21	5	(0)
- * Club domestic league appearances and goals

Ricardo Jorge Oliveira Ribeiro Duarte (born 11 February 1982 in Pontinha (Odivelas)), known as Santamaria, is a Portuguese former professional footballer who played as a central defender.

== Honours ==
Sporting CP

- Taça de Portugal: 2001–02
