= Mikel Santamaría =

Spanish footballer

Personal information
- Full name: Mikel Santamaría Ciprián
- Date of birth: 20 July 1987 (age 39)
- Place of birth: Pamplona, Spain
- Height: 1.88 m (6 ft 2 in)
- Position: Centre-back

Team information
- Current team: Izarra
- Number: 5

Youth career
- 2004–2006: Osasuna

Senior career*
| Years | Team | Apps | (Gls) |
| 2006–2008 | Osasuna B | 12 | (0) |
| 2008–2009 | Alfaro | 16 | (0) |
| 2009–2011 | Bilbao Athletic | 46 | (0) |
| 2011–2013 | Albacete | 51 | (1) |
| 2013–2015 | Leganés | 56 | (1) |
| 2015–2017 | Racing Santander | 68 | (2) |
| 2017–2018 | Hércules | 28 | (0) |
| 2018–2019 | Logroñés | 10 | (1) |
| 2020–2021 | Calahorra | 21 | (1) |
| 2021–2022 | Racing Rioja | 33 | (3) |
| 2022–2024 | Tudelano | 57 | (1) |
| 2024– | Izarra | 57 | (1) |
- * Club domestic league appearances and goals as of 16:10, 21 July 2026 (UTC)

Mikel Santamaría Ciprián (born 20 July 1987) is a Spanish footballer who plays as a centre-back for CD Izarra.

== Club career ==
Born in Pamplona, Navarre, Santamaría finished his development at CA Osasuna, and made his senior debut with the reserves in the Segunda División B. In 2008, he signed with CD Alfaro of the same league.

Santamaría joined Athletic Bilbao in the summer of 2009, being assigned to the B team also in the third division. He subsequently represented, still in that tier, Albacete Balompié and CD Leganés, being promoted to Segunda División with the latter club at the end of the 2013–14 season.

On 24 August 2014, Santamaría played his first match as a professional, starting in a 1–1 home draw against Deportivo Alavés. On 21 July of the following year, he moved to Racing de Santander, recently relegated from division two.

== Personal life ==
Santamaría's older brother, Roberto, was also a footballer. A goalkeeper, he too was developed at Osasuna. In 2022, both siblings signed for CD Tudelano and played together for the first time.
