= Gothic art and architecture in Pavia =

Gothic architecture and art in Pavia, Italy (13th to 15th centuries)

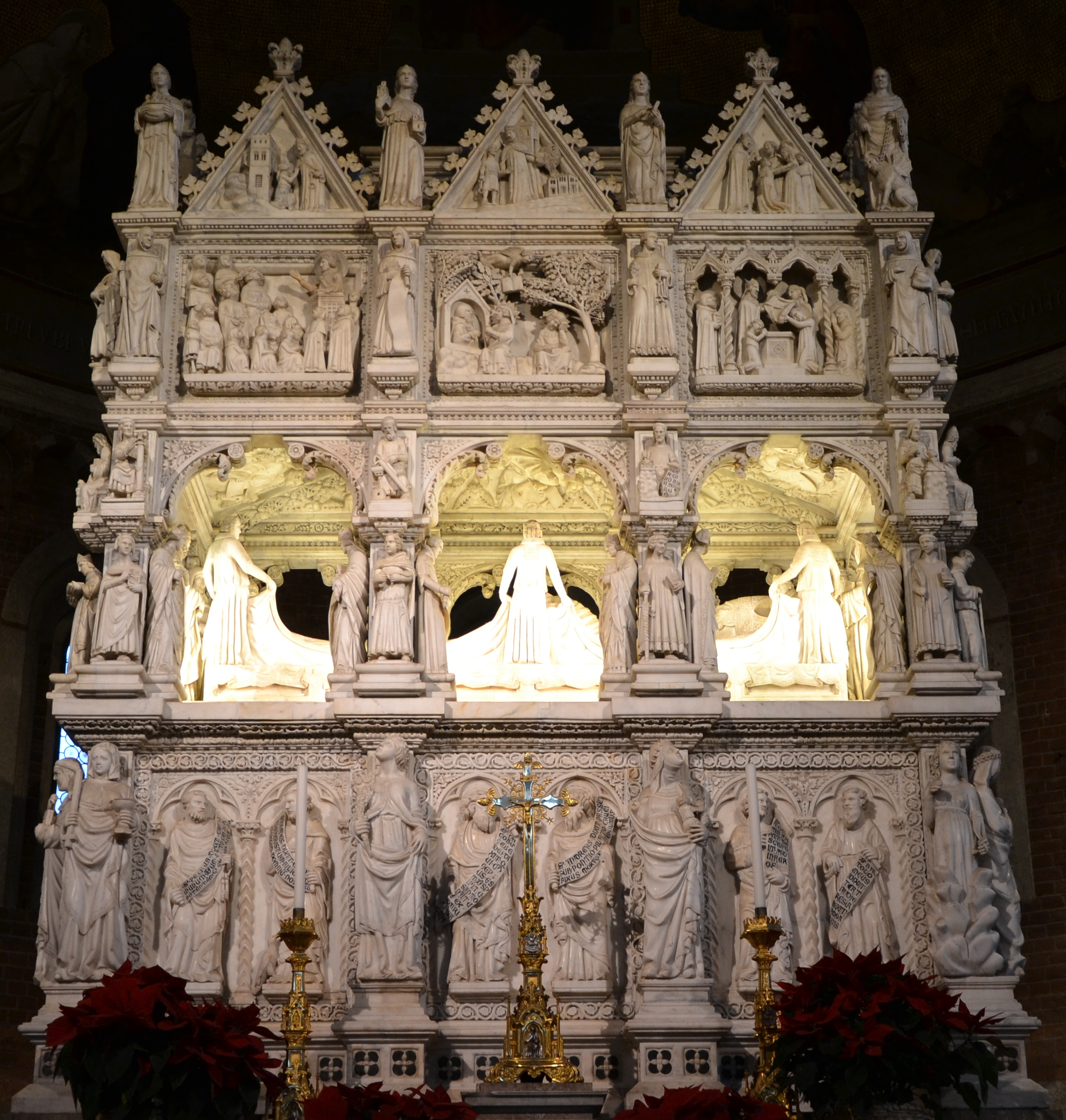
Arca di S. Agostino (1362), Pavia, S. Pietro in Ciel d'Oro

Gothic art and architecture flourished in the city of Pavia (near Milan) between the late 13th century and the first half of the 15th. Thanks to the importance that the city still held in the Lombard area, Pavia was the protagonist of a vibrant artistic period, first under communal power and then under the Visconti, who intended through their commissions to assert their dominance over the second center of the Duchy of Milan, also commissioning works of great value such as the monumental Arca di Sant'Agostino or, by Gentile da Fabriano, the Madonna and Child with Two Saints.

== Architecture ==
=== Religious buildings ===
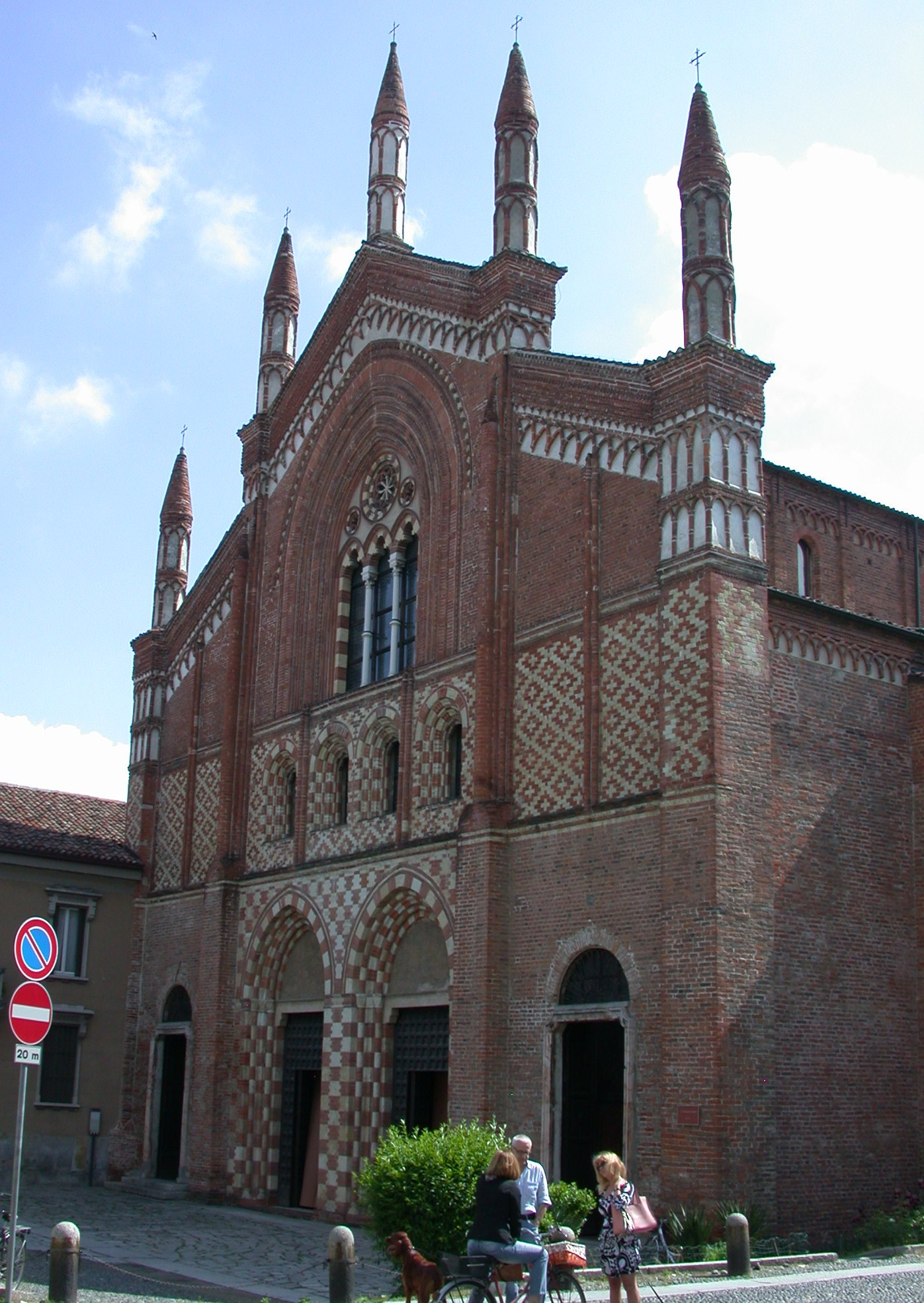
Church of San Francesco

Among the earliest Gothic churches in Pavia is the Church of San Francesco, completed towards the end of the 13th century. The facade presents itself as a faceted facade with terracotta as the predominant element, as typical of Lombard architecture: it is divided into three vertical sections accentuated by buttresses as well as the facets. The central section is the most decorated, with a double portal on the ground floor, likely borrowed from the Basilica of San Francesco in Assisi but also recalling the double fornix of the urban gates of Milan of the time. Above the portals is a stringcourse with four monofore, surmounted in turn by a monumental trifora: the area of the two portals and the stringcourse across all three vertical sections is decorated with diamonds and squares composed of alternating red bricks and white plaster; the facade is topped by five cylindrical pinnacles.

The plan of the church results from the combination of the basilical plan of the hall and the Greek cross plan of the choir. Very few fragments of the original internal decoration remain, including a San Francesco and a Madonna col Bambino from the late 13th century that recall contemporary Byzantine art and a Presentation at the Temple from the mid-14th century by a Lombard painter already active between Bergamo and the Abbey of Viboldone.

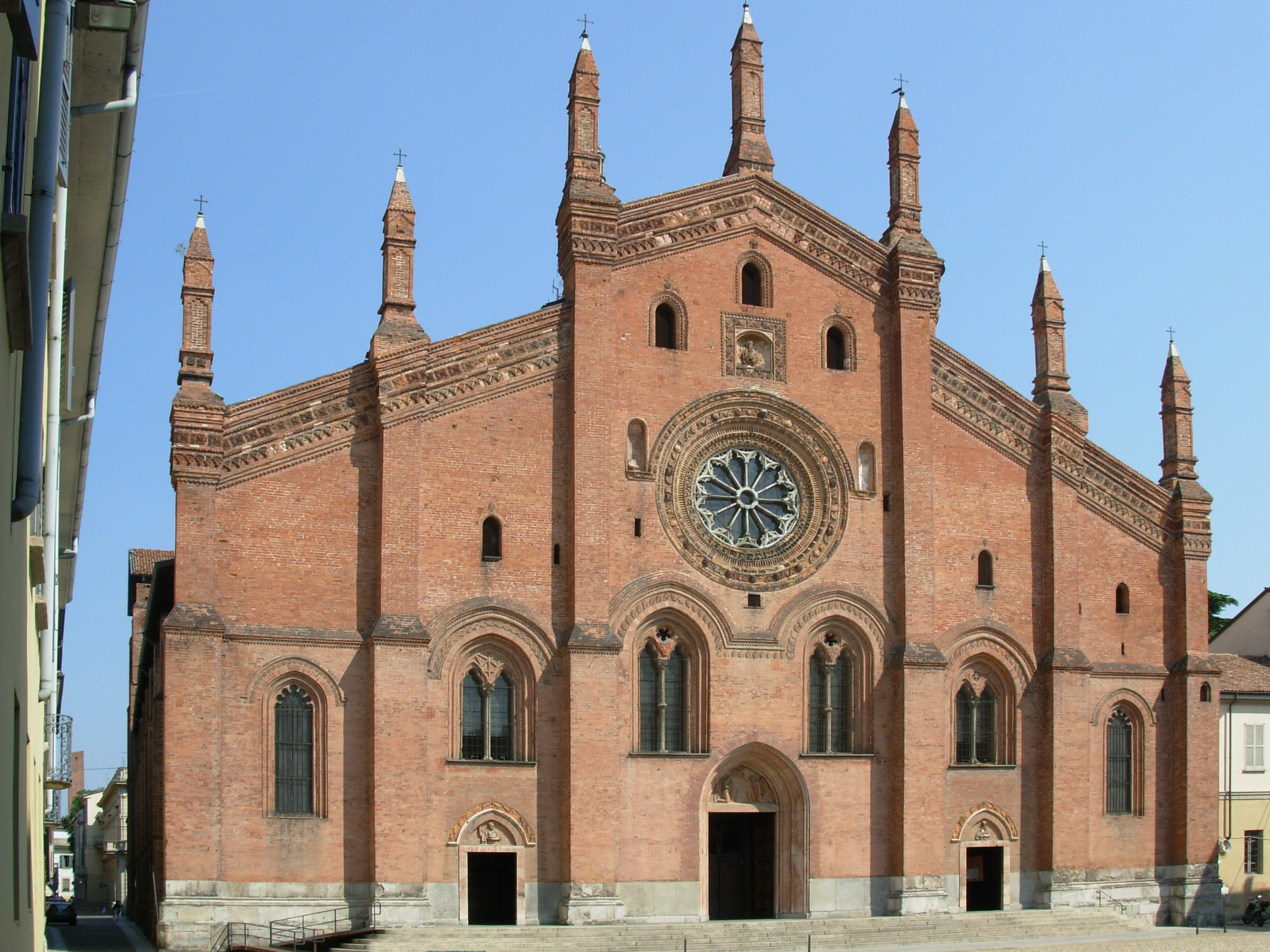
Church of Santa Maria del Carmine

The Church of Santa Maria del Carmine is later: begun in the second half of the 14th century, it would be completed around the mid-15th century: the church's design is often attributed to Bernardo da Venezia, who would later replicate this design for the namesake Church of Santa Maria del Carmine in Milan. The facade appears rather squat, in contrast to the vertical development typical of Gothic, decorated, save for some details, in terracotta. It is divided by six buttresses that create five vertical sections; the two outer sections feature a monofora with a pointed arch, while the three central ones are adorned with bifore; the decoration of the central section includes a rose window flanked by niches with terracotta sculptures of the Announcing Angel and the Annunciated Virgin.

The interior has a longitudinal plan, making extensive use of a modular structure, where the plan is composed of multiple square-plan spaces of the same size: the side of the square corresponds to one-third of the facade’s width; the central nave is as wide as one square, while the side naves and chapels use a square module that is one-fourth of the main starting square (i.e., the combination of two chapels and two bays of the side nave occupies a space equivalent to one bay of the central nave). The vaults are cross vaults supported by bundled piers forming round arches.

==== The Certosa ====
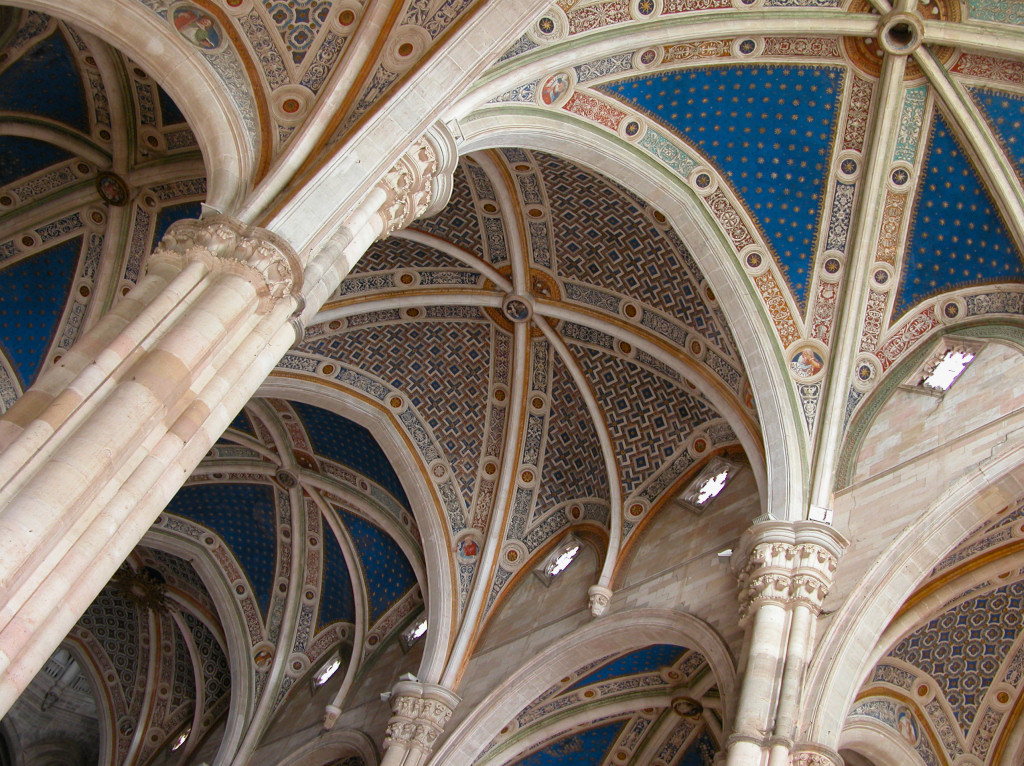
Interior of the Certosa di Pavia

The Certosa di Pavia, commissioned as an ex-voto by Gian Galeazzo Visconti, was, alongside Milan Cathedral, the largest late Gothic construction site in Lombardy and among the most significant in all of Italy. The project was originally assigned to Bernardo da Venezia along with Giacomo da Campione, already active at the Milan Cathedral site: Gian Galeazzo’s intention to place the Visconti family mausoleum there led to the order for the appointees to build a grandiose church, with proportions not too dissimilar from the grand construction site of the city cathedral, from which the structure of the three Gothic naves was notably borrowed, one of the few purely Gothic elements of the church.

Upon Gian Galeazzo’s death in 1402, the church’s construction slowed significantly: work resumed noticeably with the rise of the Sforza, who restarted the project in a style blending late Gothic and Renaissance, seeing it concluded with the creation of the facade, a masterpiece of the Lombard Renaissance. Of the original late Gothic layout, already deeply modified and remodeled in the Renaissance period, the three naves separated by sturdy bundled pillars with Gothic ribbed vaulting remain clearly visible, inspired by the hall of the Milan Cathedral.

=== Civil and military buildings ===
==== The Visconti Castle ====
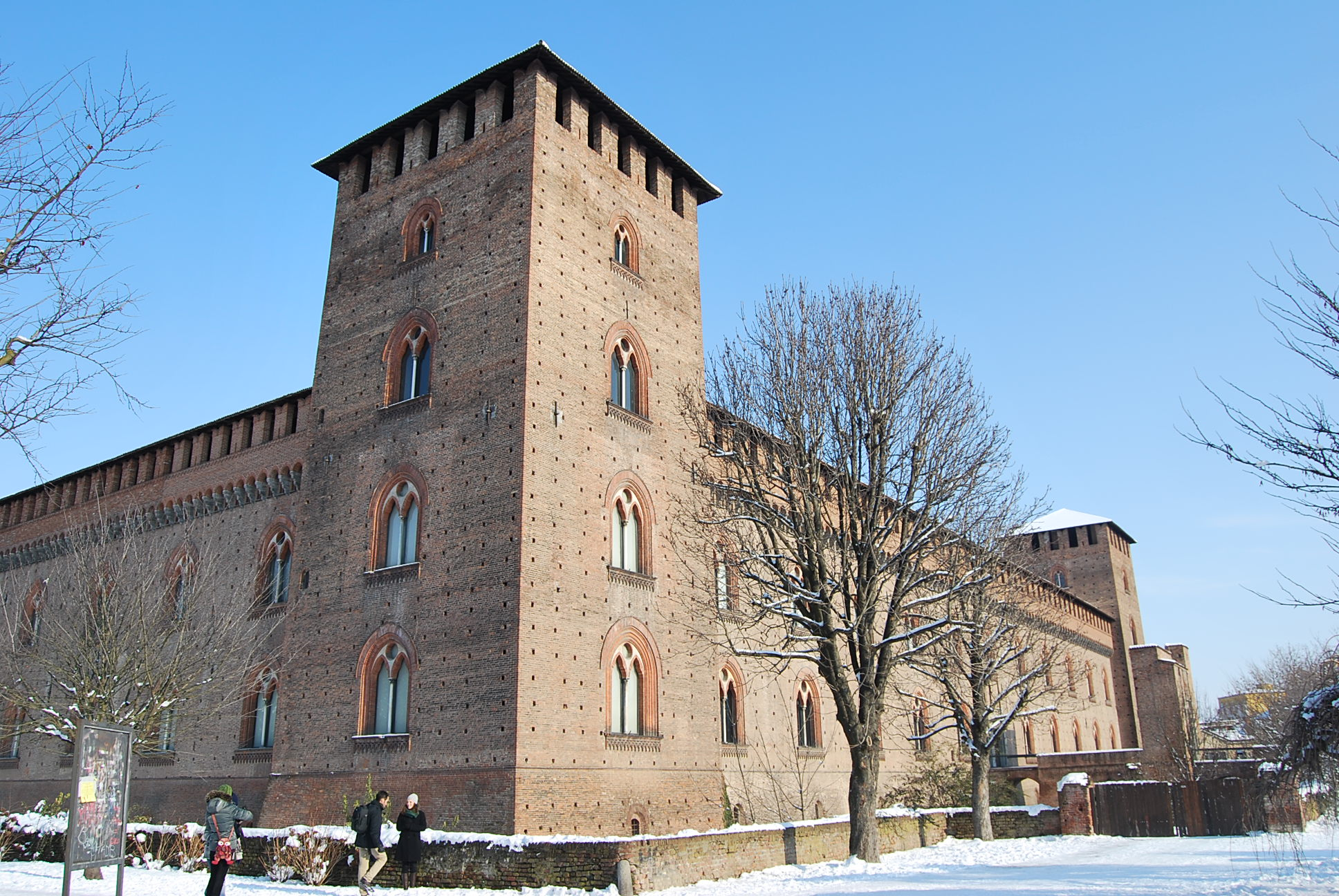
Pavia, Visconti Castle

The Visconti Castle, a military structure also used as a lordly residence, is undoubtedly the greatest Gothic civil monument in the city. It was built on the ruins of the old fortress destroyed by Luchino Visconti, and based on a design by Bernardo da Venezia starting in 1359: its construction utilized workers from across the Duchy of Milan, which reached its maximum expansion under Gian Galeazzo Visconti, the castle’s patron; thanks to this labor effort from throughout the duchy, the castle was completed in just seven years. Though essentially a fortress, it was decorated in a sumptuous and refined manner, so much so that Pier Candido Decembrio described it at the time as “a residence unequaled in Italy”. The northern side of the castle, destroyed by French artillery during a siege in 1525 and never rebuilt, contained frescoes by Pisanello of Animals with a gold background, similar to the Theodelinda Chapel in Monza.

The castle’s perimeter walls are decorated with a double row of bifore in terracotta: the entrance is introduced by a ravelin. Inside, the castle’s residential purpose becomes even clearer: the large courtyard has a ground-floor portico with cylindrical stone pillars and pointed arches; on the upper floor of the southern side, there are quadrifore linked by a continuous frame running along the entire courtyard perimeter. The quadrifore consist of pillars supporting trilobed arches, while between the quadrifore and the frame are three oculi containing decorative terracotta elements. The quadrifore, once present on all four sides of the courtyard, were replaced with bifore and monofore on the western and eastern sides respectively.

The castle also housed one of Italy’s greatest libraries: an inventory from 1426 cataloged 988 handwritten works. However, the entire library was looted by French troops during the siege of the castle in the 16th century, completely dispersing the collection.

==== Palaces ====
Among the most famous of other civil palaces of the Gothic–Visconti period is the Palazzo dei Diversi, or "Red House" (because originally covered in red plaster): in the city’s main square, reorganized at the behest of the Visconti, it has a portico with large pointed arches. The rest of the palace, heavily altered over the years, shows remnants of the original decoration in the monumental trifora in terracotta and some surviving monofore.

Various alterations have also been made to the Palazzo Folperti: of the late Gothic decorations, we find the original double entrance portal with a round arch, now walled up, and the ogival monofore on the upper floors. Although partially altered in subsequent centuries, many other Pavian palaces retain much of their Gothic structure and original decorations, notably: the Palazzo dell'ex Albergo del Saracino, the Casa Danioni, Casa Belcredi, Casa Lonati, and the Palazzo Aschieri and Palazzo Beccaria.

Dating from the early 15th century, only a small portion remains of the original complex of the Casa degli Eustachi. Built by Pasino Eustachi, a commander under Gian Galeazzo Visconti, the house displays extensive terracotta decoration typical of late Lombard Gothic with ogival windows with wide profiling. The entrance portal has the same decoration as the monofore and is surmounted by a decorated terracotta panel. Founded in 1429 by Cardinal Branda Castiglioni, the Collegio Castiglioni Brugnatelli almost entirely preserves the appearance it had in the first half of the 15th century.

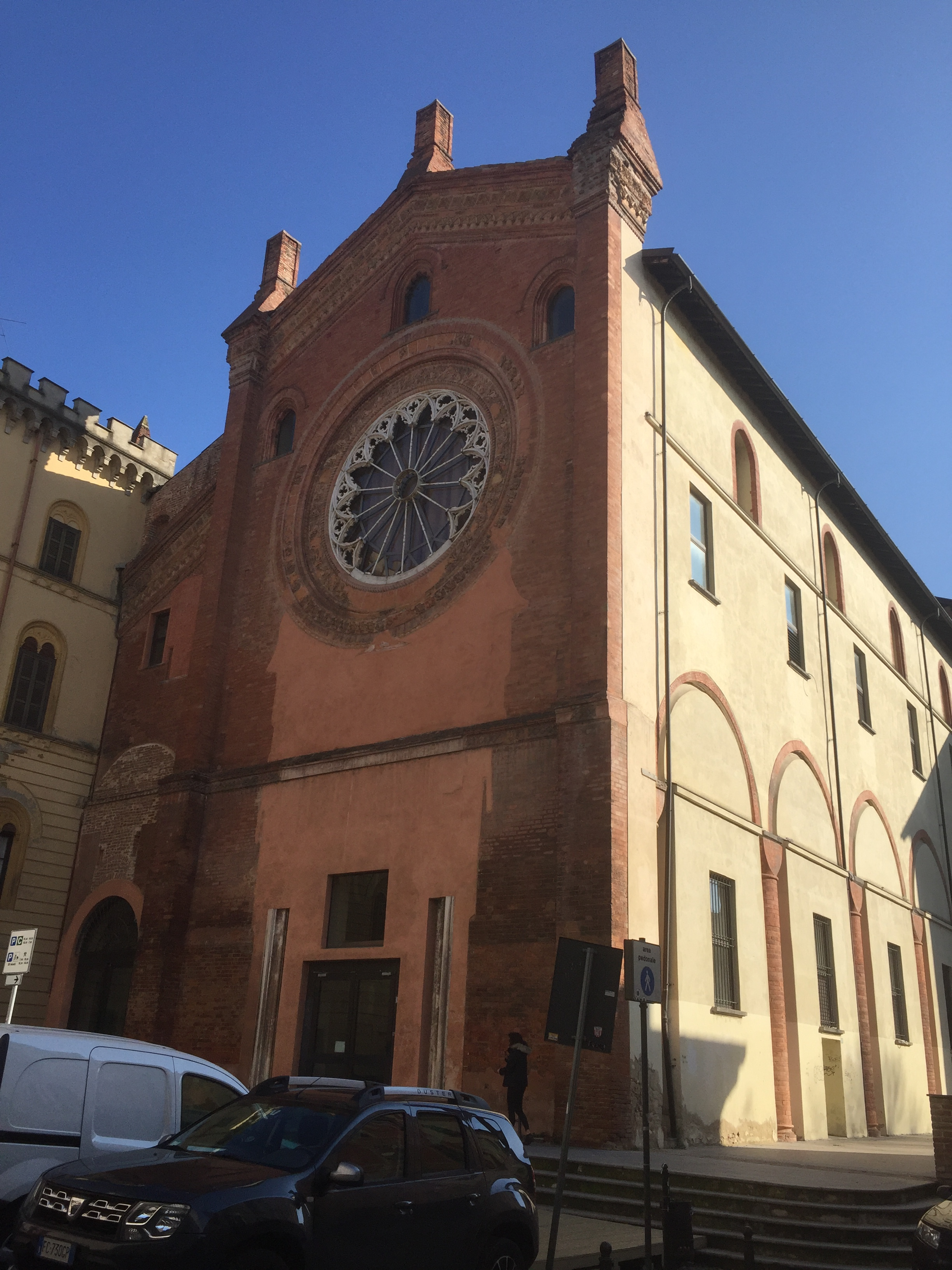
The former Church of San Tommaso

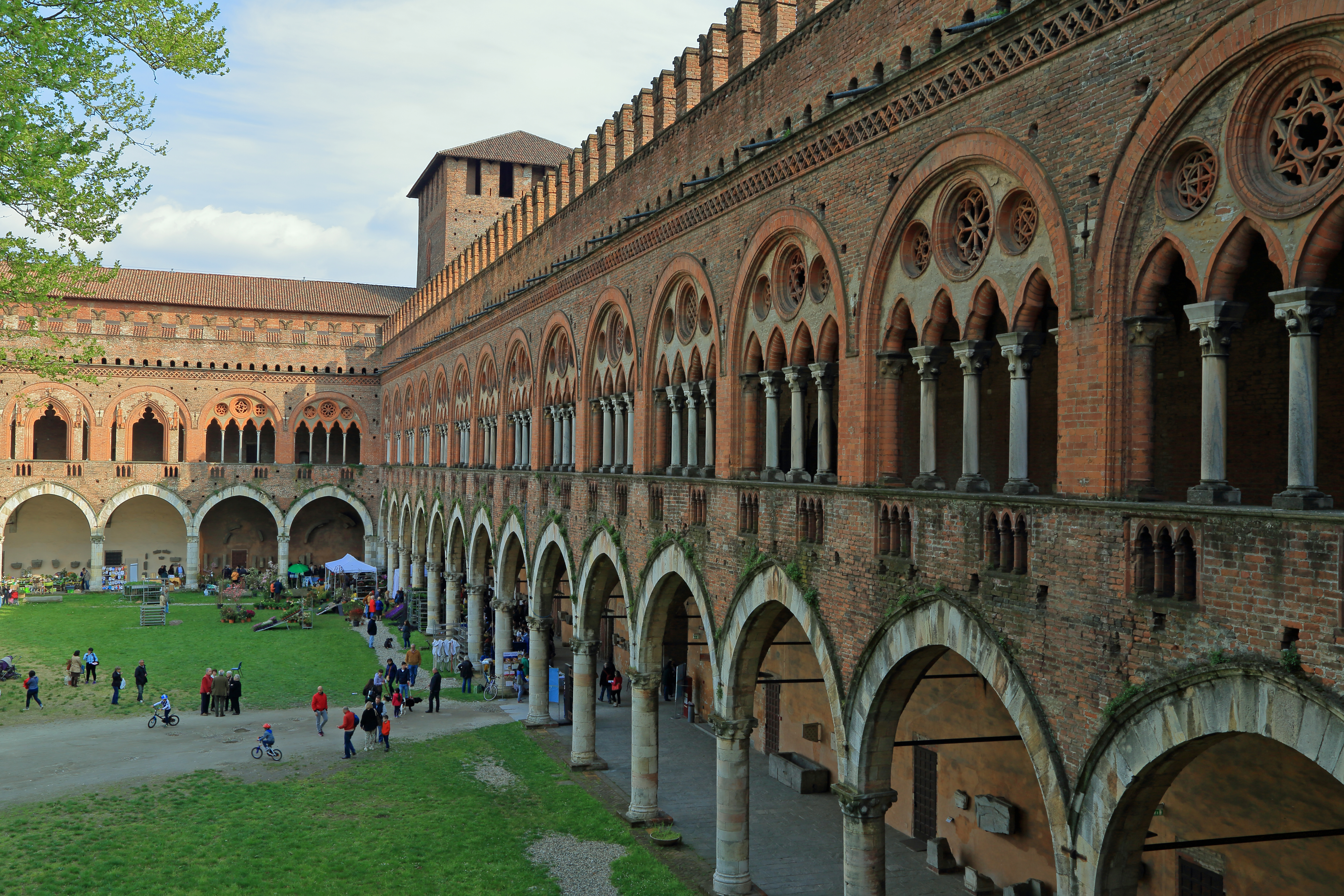
Courtyard of the castle

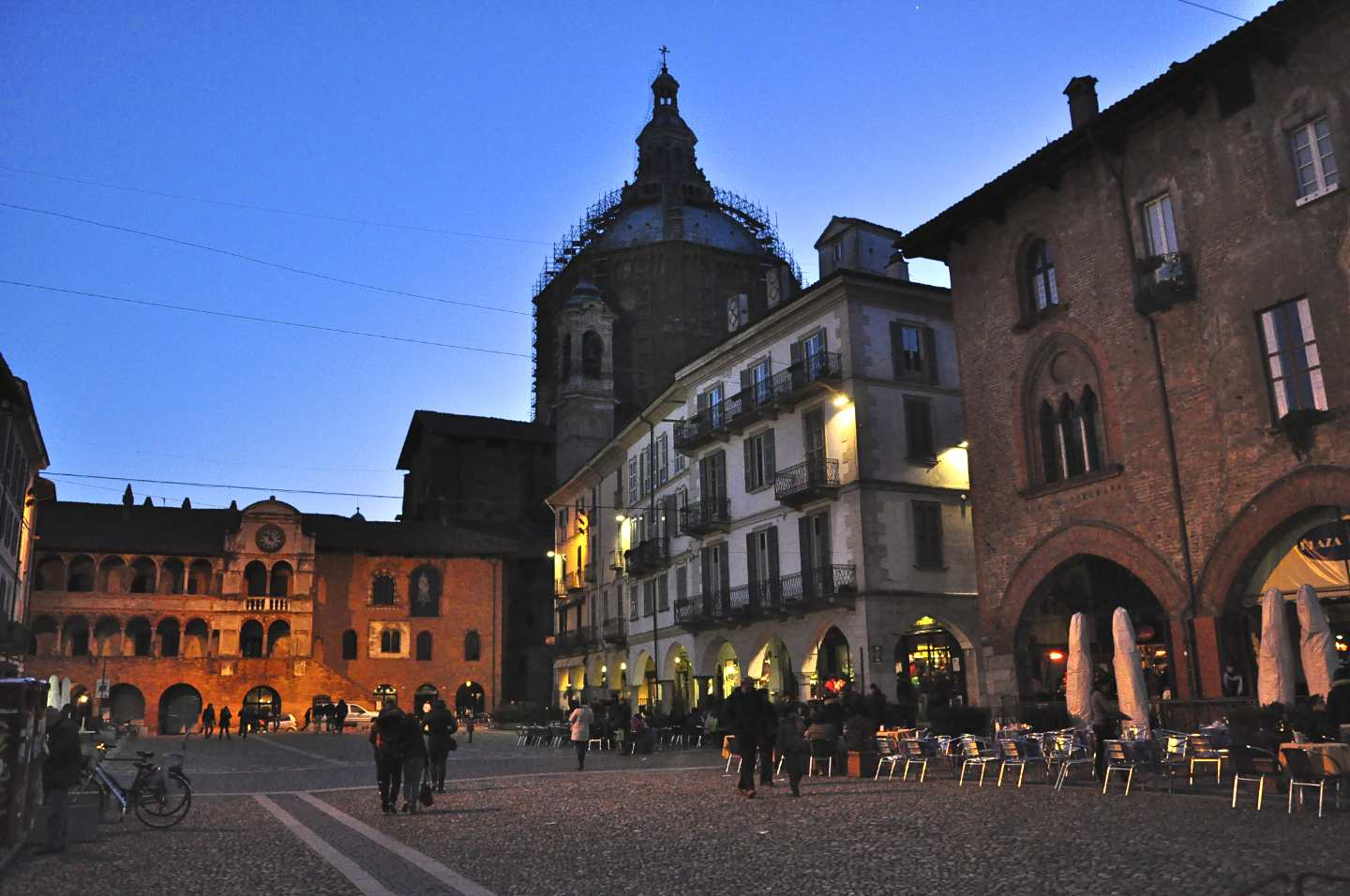
Portico in Piazza della Vittoria and Casa dei Diversi on the right

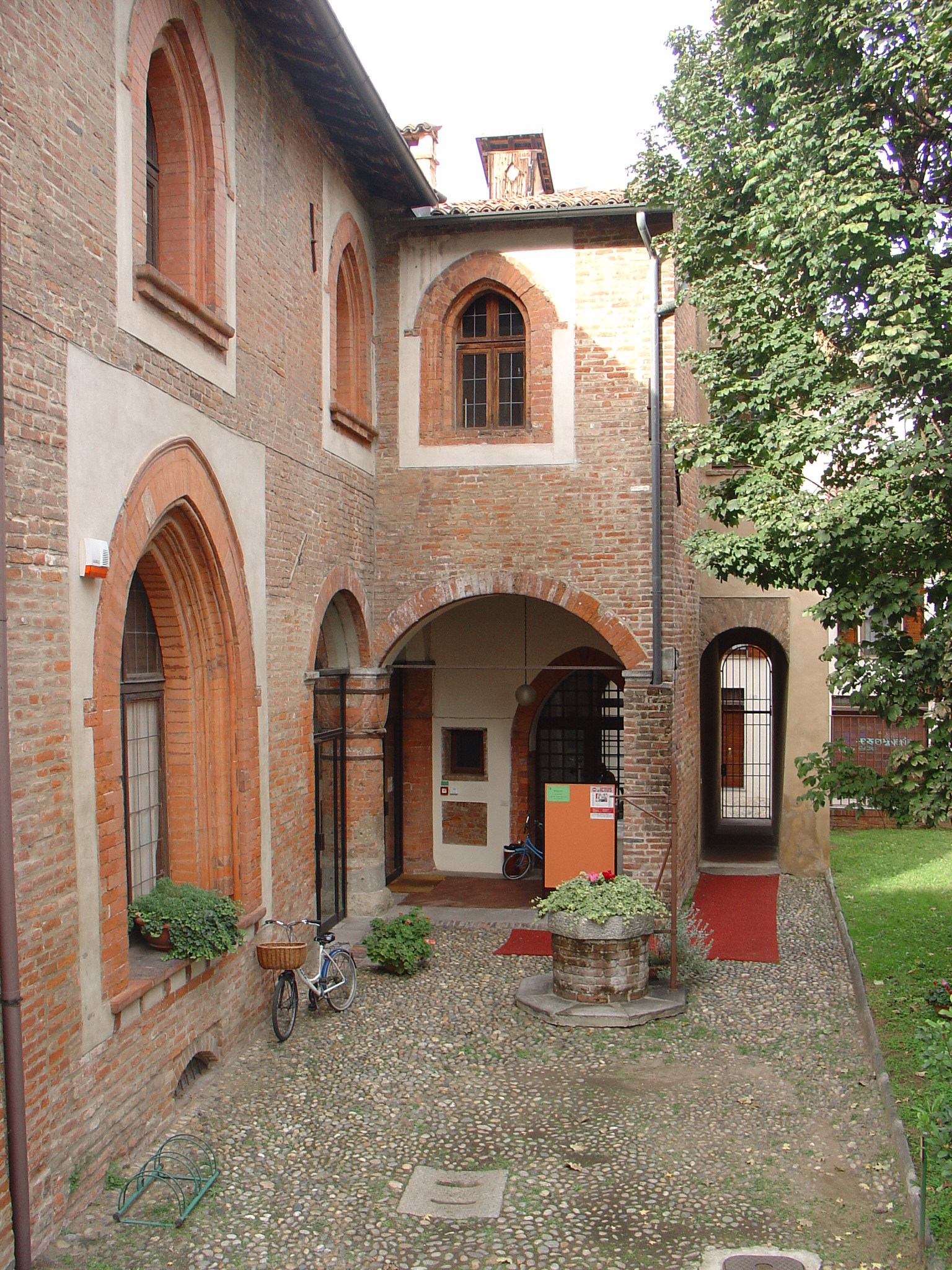
Casa degli Eustachi

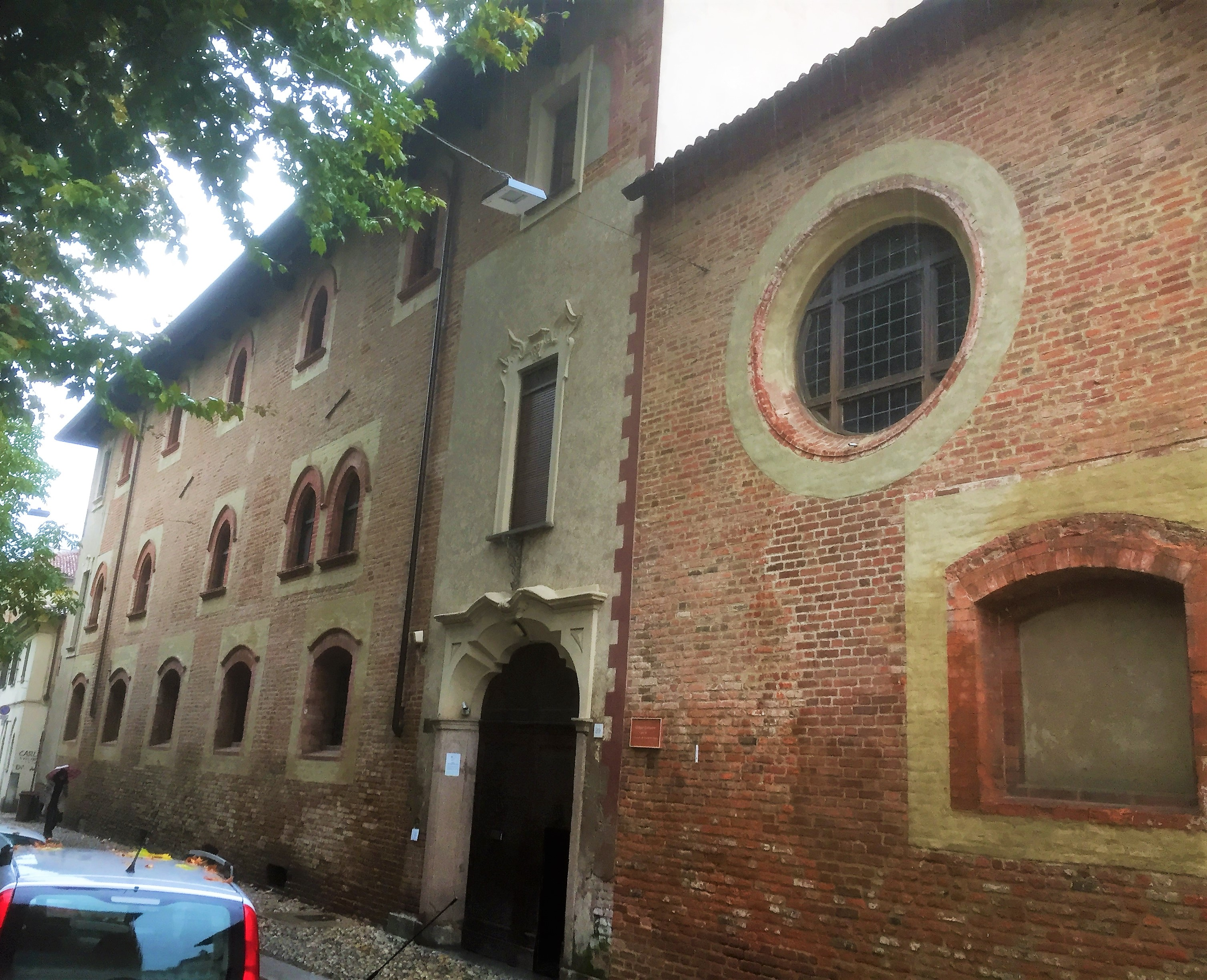
The Castiglioni College

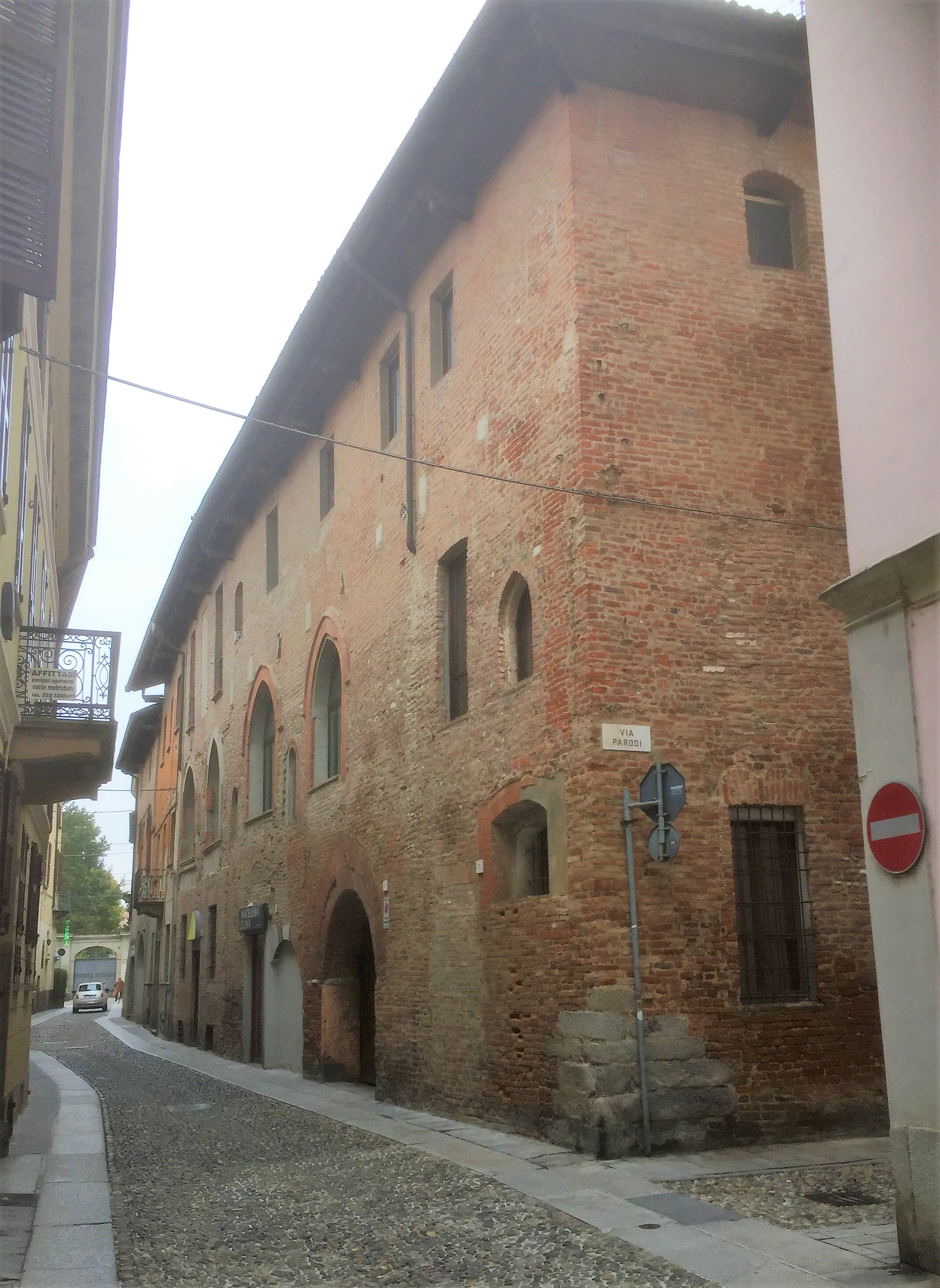
Palazzo Folperti

== Painting ==
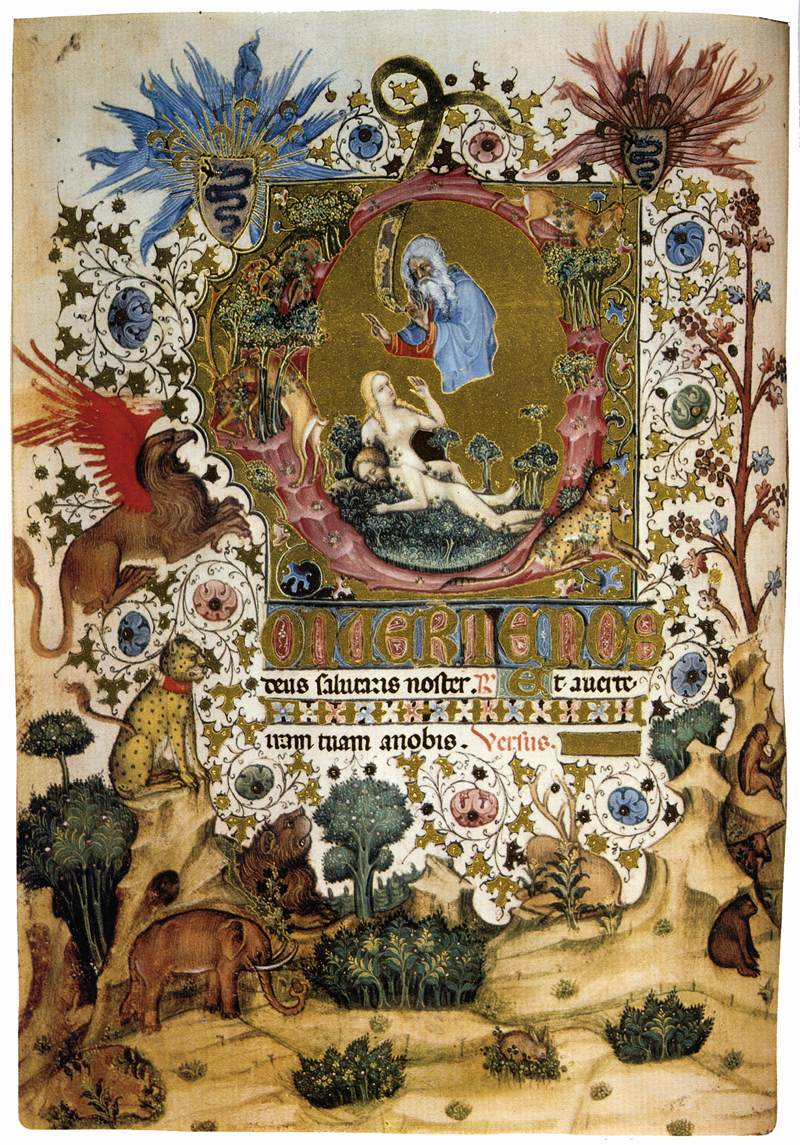
Book of Hours of the Visconti by an anonymous Lombard miniaturist

Among the examples of Gothic painting in the city, a prominent place is held by the remains of the grand pictorial cycles promoted by Galeazzo II Visconti and later Gian Galeazzo Visconti in the Visconti Castle, such as the remnants of frescoes depicting the View of Pavia (south wing, third bay) and Knights (west wing, sixth and eighth bays) dating to the seventh decade of the 14th century and recently attributed to Giusto de' Menabuoi, the sinopia with the image of the Pietà on the chapel portal by Michelino da Besozzo, while inside the space preserves paintings by the Bolognese Andrea de' Bartoli and, above all, the two figures of ladies, recently attributed to Gentile da Fabriano, commissioned by Gian Galeazzo Visconti in 1393 for the "ladies’ room".

=== The Ouvrage de Lombardie ===
After establishing the court and the Biblioteca visconteo sforzesca in Pavia, the Visconti founded the most prestigious school of miniature in the region in the city, which as Ouvrage de Lombardie soon became famous throughout Europe for its realism and refined decorativeness.

The Visconti atelier of miniaturists had, since around 1370, developed a refined fusion of Giottoesque chromatism with courtly and chivalric themes. Protagonists of this early phase were the anonymous miniaturist author of the Guiron le Coutois and the Lancelot du Lac, now at the National Library of France in Paris, and Giovannino de' Grassi, who illuminated the prayer book called Hours of Gian Galeazzo Visconti, with representations of great linear elegance, naturalistic accuracy, and decorative preciousness.

The next generation, especially in the personality of Michelino da Besozzo, elaborated this heritage in an even freer, more imaginative, and international manner. In the Offiziolo Bodmer, he used a fluid line, soft colors, and a precious rhythm in the drawing of figures, disregarding spatial concerns with indifference; all enriched by very fresh naturalistic details taken from direct observation. Michelino’s graceful style was successful and widely followed for a long time: based on it, the Zavattari painted the frescoes in the Theodelinda Chapel in the Monza Cathedral in the 15th century, characterized by soft tones, and astonished and weightless figures from the courtly world.

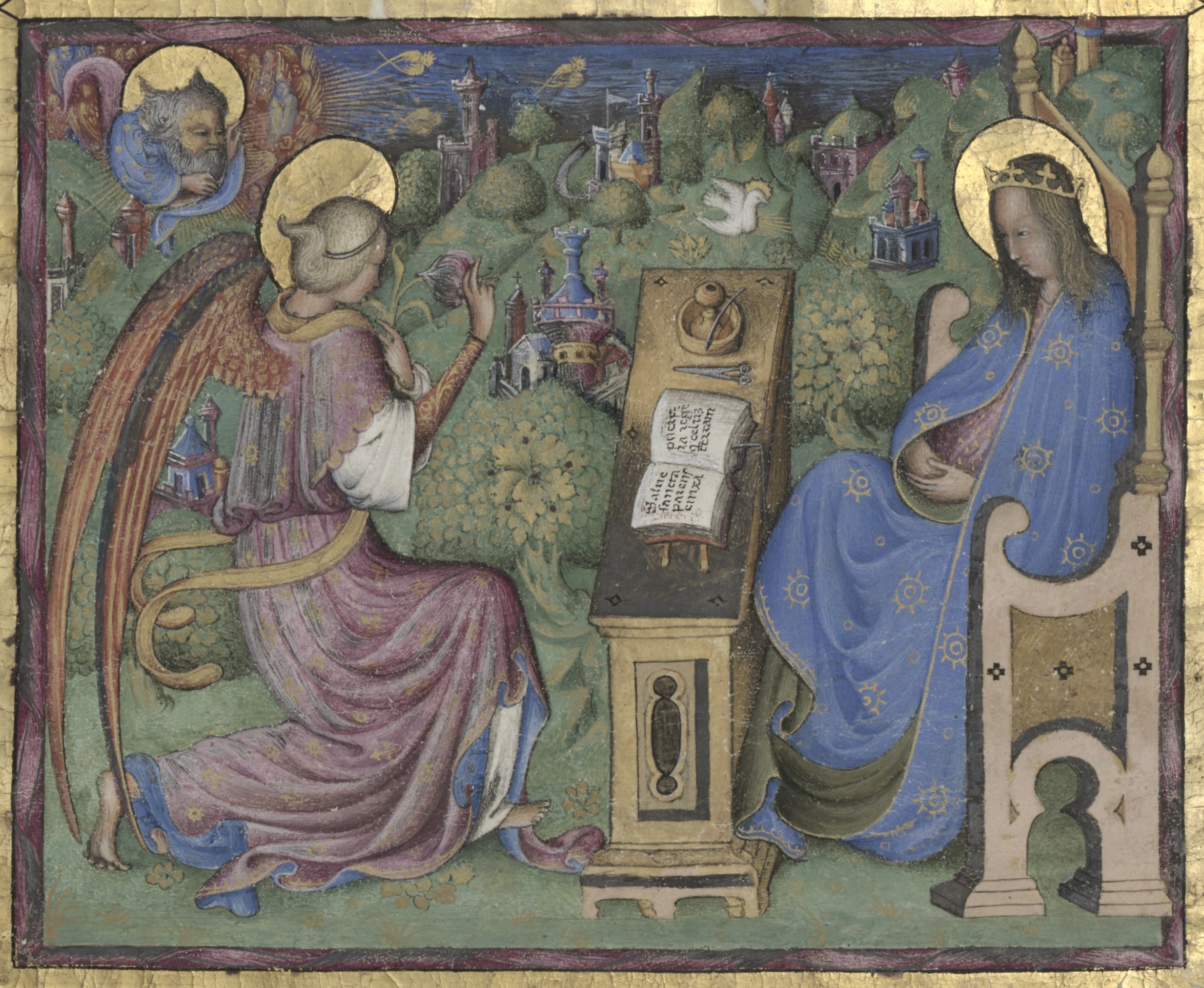
Belbello da Pavia, Antiphonary, Annunciation, Cleveland Museum of Art

The other strand alongside Michelino’s gentle style was the grotesque, taken from the works of Franco and Filippolo de Veris in the fresco of the Giudizio universale in the Church of Santa Maria dei Ghirli in Campione d'Italia (1400), or from the expressive miniatures of Belbello da Pavia. For example, in the Bibbia di Niccolò d'Este, illuminated by Belbello between 1431–1434, fluid and distorting lines, physically imposing figures, exaggerated gestures, and bright, shifting colors are used. He remained faithful to this vocabulary throughout his long career, until around 1470. Another famous manuscript that saw collaboration between Belbello and the so-called Maestro delle Vitae Imperatorum (an unnamed figure already the author of the copy of Suetonius’s Vitae Imperatorum held at the National Library of France) is the Semideus by Cato Sacco, now preserved in the Russian National Library.

== See also ==
- Italian Gothic architecture
- Gothic architecture
- Monza
