= San Francesco, Pavia =

Church in Lombardy, Italy

Coordinates: 45°11′14.31″N 9°9′34.85″E

Church of Saint Francis of Assisi
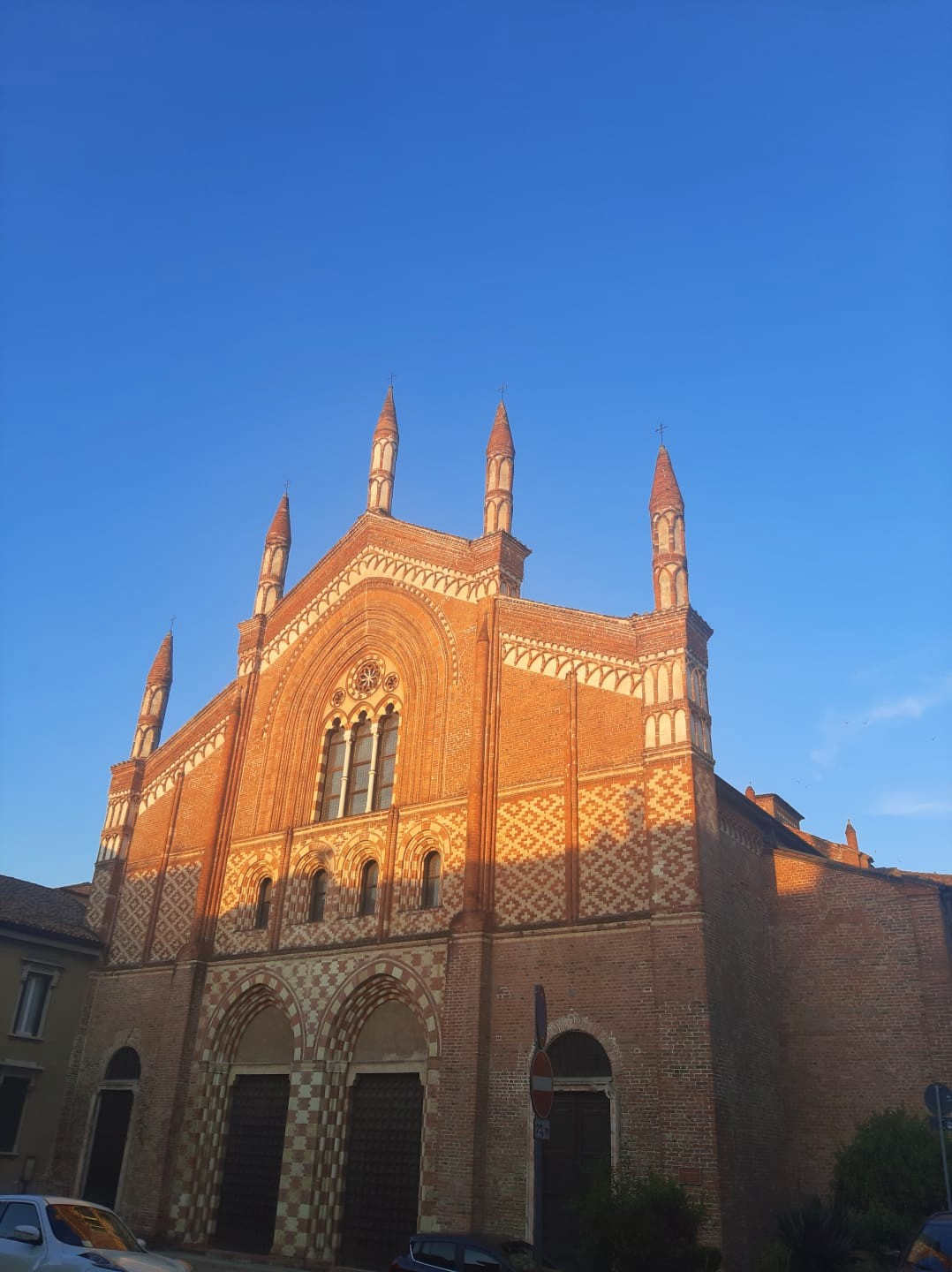
- Façade.

Religion
- Affiliation: Catholic
- Province: Pavia
- Year consecrated: 13th Century
- Status: Active

Location
- Location: Pavia, Italy
- Interactive map of Church of Saint Francis of Assisi

Architecture
- Type: Church
- Style: Gothic
- Completed: 14th Century

The church of San Francesco of Assisi is a Catholic religious building in Pavia, Lombardy, Italy.

== History ==
The first Franciscan community settled in the city around 1220. Initially the friars settled in a church dedicated to the Madonna, located outside the city walls, where they are still reported in a document dated 1234, and in 1267 the construction of the current one began. church of San Francesco of Assisi. The construction of the new building proceeded very slowly, given that, despite the numerous donations, the church and the nearby convent could be said to be almost completed in 1298, when the Franciscans definitively abandoned the suburban complex which was ceded by them to the Carmelites. After the capture of Pavia in 1359, Galeazzo II moved his court from Milan to Pavia and the church was chosen by the lord, and then by his son Gian Galeazzo, to house the burials of members of the family or prominent figures; In fact, Isabella of Valois (first wife of Gian Galeazzo), Carlo and Azzone (sons of Gian Galeazzo and Isabella), the Marquis Manfred V of Saluzzo, Baldus de Ubaldis and, later, Facino Cane were buried here. Almost all the funerary monuments were, following the dictates of the Council of Trent, were eliminated between the sixteenth and seventeenth centuries, while that of Baldus deg Ubaldis was placed in 1790 on the recommendation of Leopoldo Pollack inside one of the courtyards of the university.

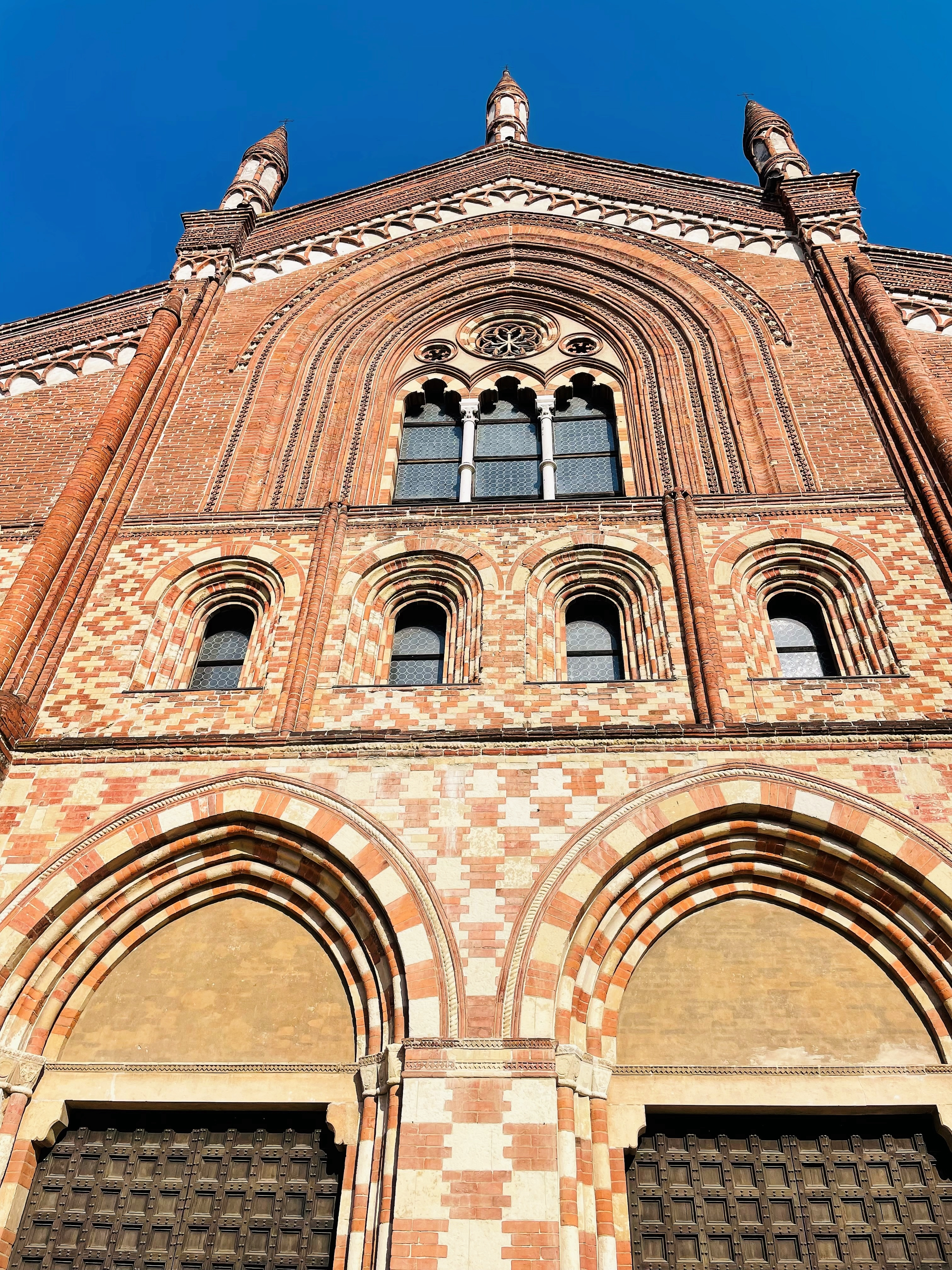
Façade

In addition, the church received donations from prominent figures of the Visconti court, as in 1388, when Ottone Mandelli left the Franciscans three Gothic busts in gilded copper (still preserved in the church) containing the relics of Saint Apollonius, Saint Victor and Saint Corona, taken from Mandelli in the Canossa Castle in 1381. In 1781 the convent was suppressed and the church became an urban parish.

== Architecture ==
The church has a Latin cross plan, formed by two building bodies: the first, oriental, with a Greek cross (to which the chapel of the Immaculate Conception was added in the 18th century, by Giovanni Ruggeri) and the second body inserted in the Greek cross, which extends to form the long arm of the church, so as to form a Latin cross, which ends with the facade.

The length of the building is 68 meters. The structure of the church has three naves. Inside there is a front part characterized by a trussed roof on round arches (which are 14 in all) and a rear part with a red and white ribbed roof on pointed arches. The vaults, as in other contemporary buildings of the mendicant orders, marks the liturgical subdivision between the space reserved for religious (the eastern vaulted part) and that reserved for the laity.

The first side chapels were built starting from 1307, when that of Saint Agnes was created, followed by others in 1339 and 1347. The bell tower, located at the side of the apse and decorated with bands of terracotta arches, was built in the second half of the 13th century.

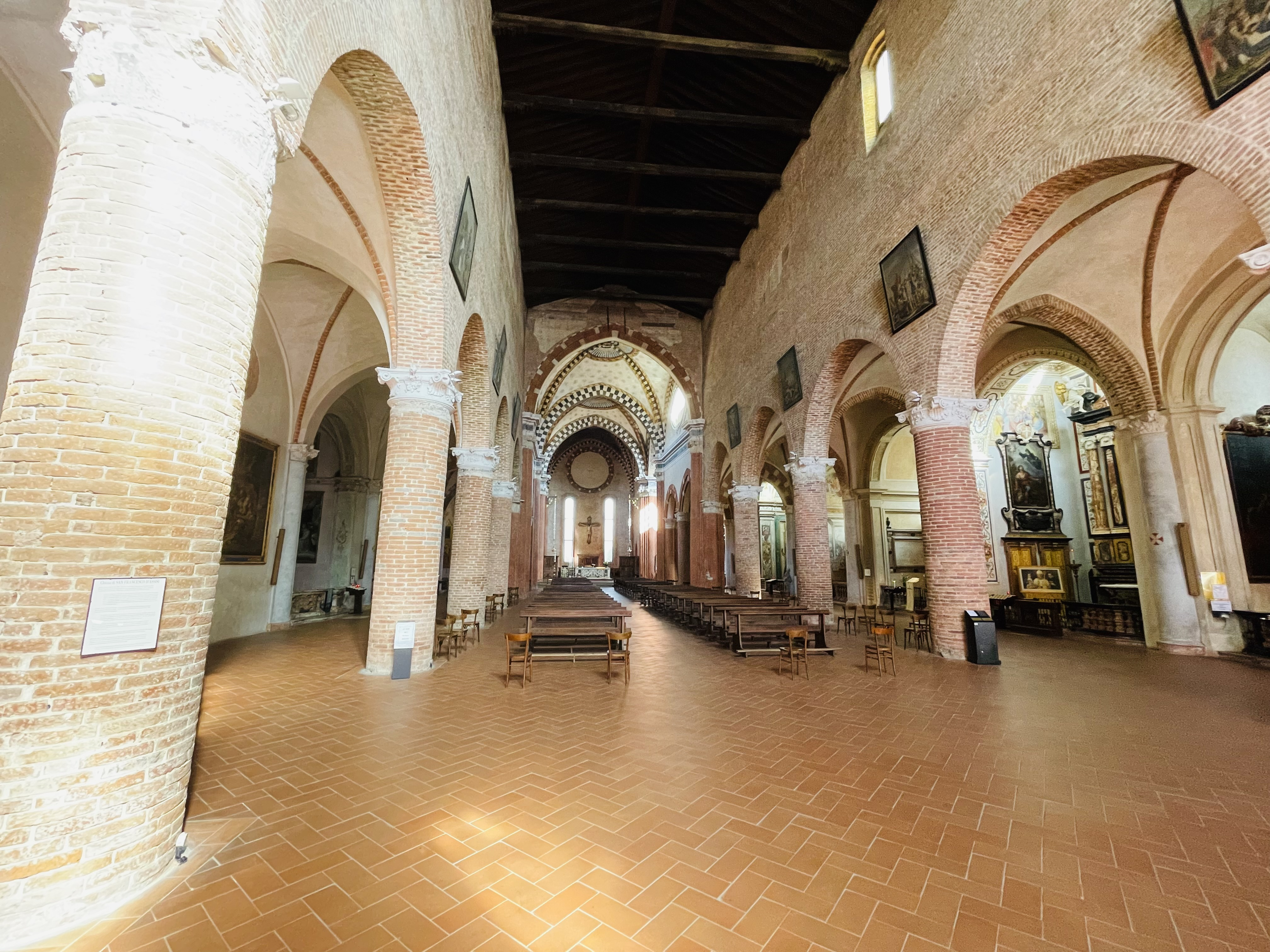
Interior

The facade, built between 1290 and 1310 in the Gothic style, is characterized by a decorative effect built on the contrast between the red of the brick and the white of the sandstone. It has, an unusual case in Italy, a double portal, according to the French style, whose openings are surrounded by a two-tone decoration. The intermediate part is entirely in brick and houses a large three-light window. The upper part of the slopes is limited by a decoration of intertwined brick arches on a light background. The building has two different types of roofs: the western part, open to the faithful, has a wooden roof in the central nave, completely different is the coverage of the space, once reserved for the friars, covered by rib vaults. The side chapels were added between the 14th and 15th centuries and house numerous works of art. Starting from the right you will find: I chapel: built between 1392 and 1398 by Giorgio Rossi, it was frescoed by Giovannino de 'Grassi, traces of these paintings can be found in the crossing of the nave. II chapel: The chapel was consecrated in 1392 by a member of the Rossi family and preserves an altarpiece with St. George on horseback by Bernardino Ciceri. III chapel: preserves a painting by Pietro Antonio Magatti depicting the apparition of Saint Francis of Paola and a late 16th century painting with the Martyrdom of Saint Stephen.

IV chapel: originally dedicated to Saint Nicholas, it was instead named after Saint Matthew by Matteo Beccaria, who was buried in it and who commissioned the Altarpiece with Saint Matthew by Vincenzo Campi (made in 1588) placed on the altar. The light and realism of Campi's work have been interpreted by critics as important precedents for Caravaggio's future painting.

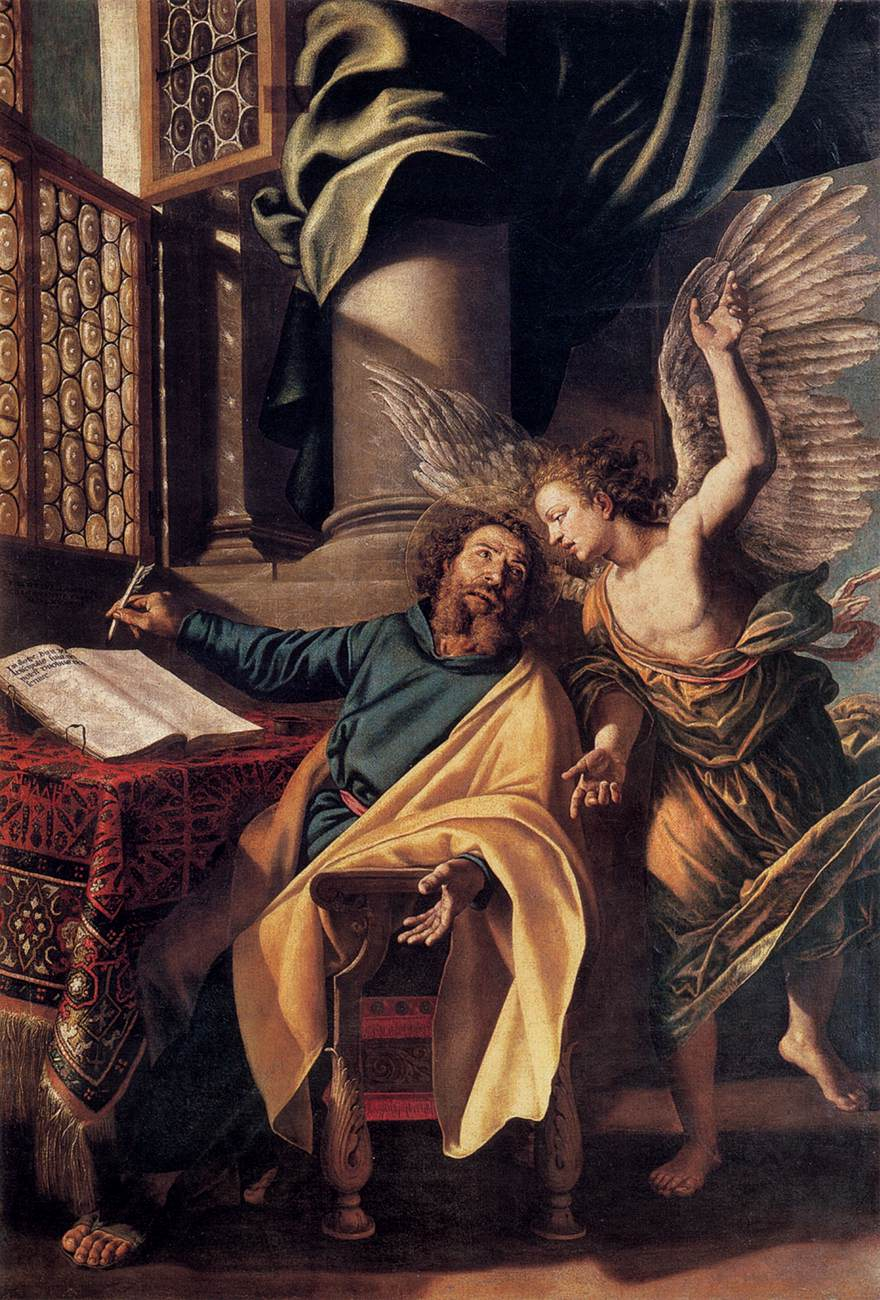
Vincenzo Campi, Altarpiece with Saint Matthew (1588)

V chapel: dedicated to Saint Agnes of Roma and Saint Catherine of Alexandria preserves a canvas with the Martyrdom of Saint Catherine of Alexandria by Camillo Procaccini and one with the Martyrdom of Saint Bartholomew, by Giovanni Battista Tassinari of 1613. VI chapel: preserved: altarpiece with Saint Francis of Paola appears in Saint Francis of Sales by Carlo Sacchi and canvases depicting Saint Francis of Paola healing the sick by Pietro Gilardi and A miracle of San Francis of Paola by Giovanni Antonio Cucchi. VII chapel: it was built in 1387 by the Pavese aristocrat Filippo Landolfi, as reported by an epigraph placed outside the chapel, but was rearranged in the second half of the 16th century, the period to which the altar belongs, the altarpiece depicting the Transfiguration of Christ, the work of Gervasio Gatti, a pupil of Bernardino Gatti, while on the side there is a triptych depicting Christ taking leave of the Virgin with the Saints Francis and Louis of Tolosa, dating back to the early decades of the sixteenth century of uncertain attribution, for some scholars the work of Bernardino Gatti, for others from Macrino d'Alba.

In the left arm of the transept, above the side door, there is a large canvas by Francesco Barbieri, painted around the middle of the eighteenth century, depicting the triumph of the Franciscan order. In the transept, the second chapel preserves an altarpiece by Giovanni Francesco Romani from the first half of the seventeenth century with the Assumption of the Virgin, while the first chapel contains two canvases by the Sienese painter Giovanni Sorbi.

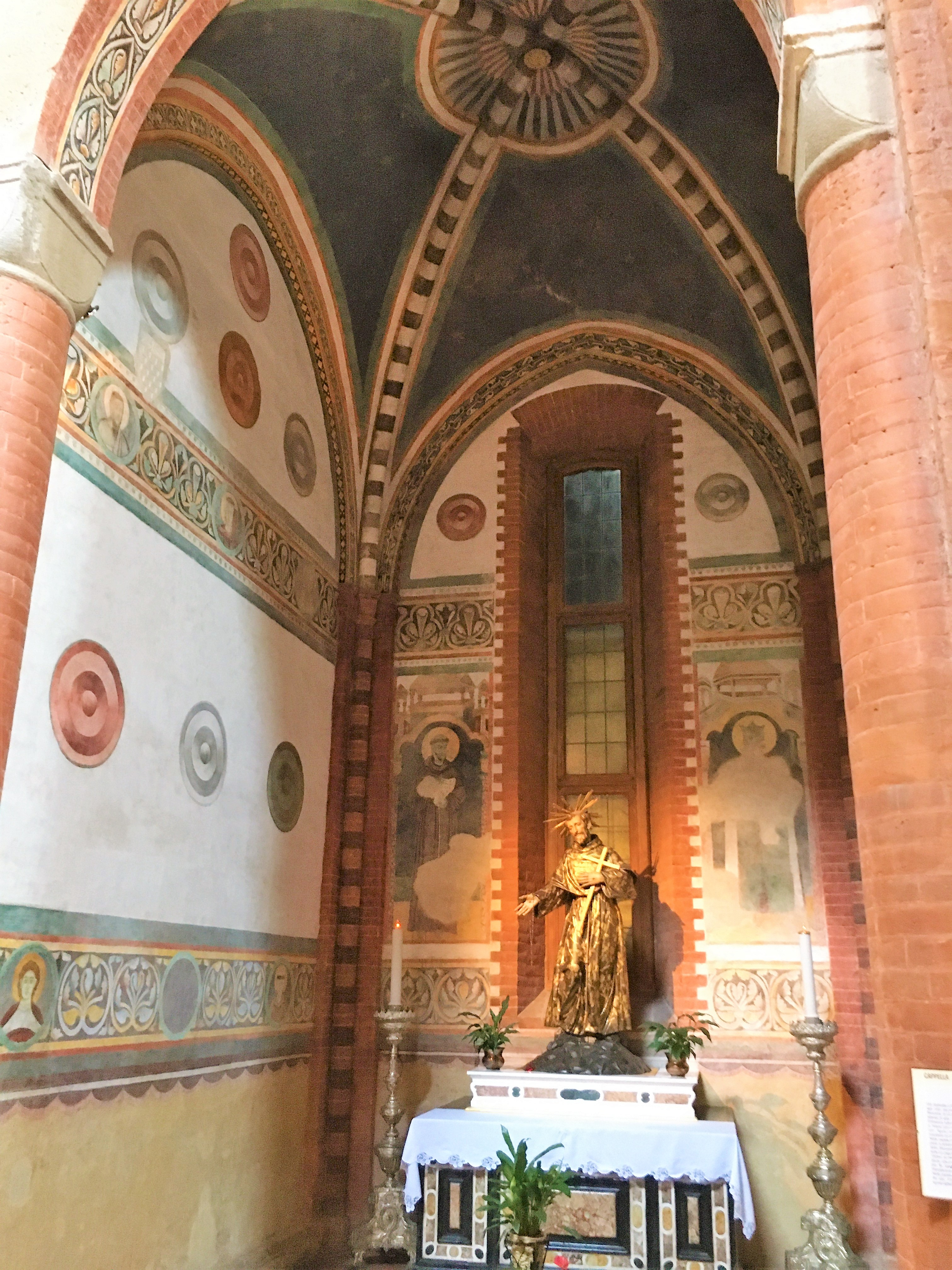
Chapel of San Francesco with frescoes dating back to around 1298.

The altar, where part of the relics of Saint Epiphanius are kept (and others, kept in a carved stone box dating back to the sixth century and coming from the church of Saint Epiphanius), is enriched by the precious wooden choir in walnut made, starting from 1484, by the brothers Giovanni Pietro and Giovanni Ambrogio Donati. Above the choir there are two frescoes, found during the restorations of the 1970s: the first, dating back to the mid-fourteenth century, depicts the presentation of Jesus in the temple, while the second, dated between the last years of the thirteenth century and the first of the following, it represents the Madonna with the Child. In the presbytery there is a large wooden crucifix from the 15th century, attributed to Baldino de Surso. In the left arm of the transept, the first chapel, whose patronage belonged to the aristocratic Beccaria family, which preserves the original late-Romanesque structure, preserves frescoes, made around 1298 and with a strong Byzantine influence, depicting St. Francis, a crowned saint and a Madonna and Child placed under architectural aedicules. At the end of the transept is the chapel of the Immaculate Conception, commissioned by the Compagnia dell'Immacolata (a brotherhood which had its seat in the church from the 16th century to the end of the 18th century) and designed by Giovanni Ruggeri in 1711. The chapel is decorated with marble and bronzes. and precious baroque decorations, the altar, completed in 1777, was designed by Giulio Galliori and preserves an altarpiece depicting the Madonna, by Bernardino Ciceri, while the dome was frescoed by Pietro Antonio Magatti. In the left aisle there are the following chapels:

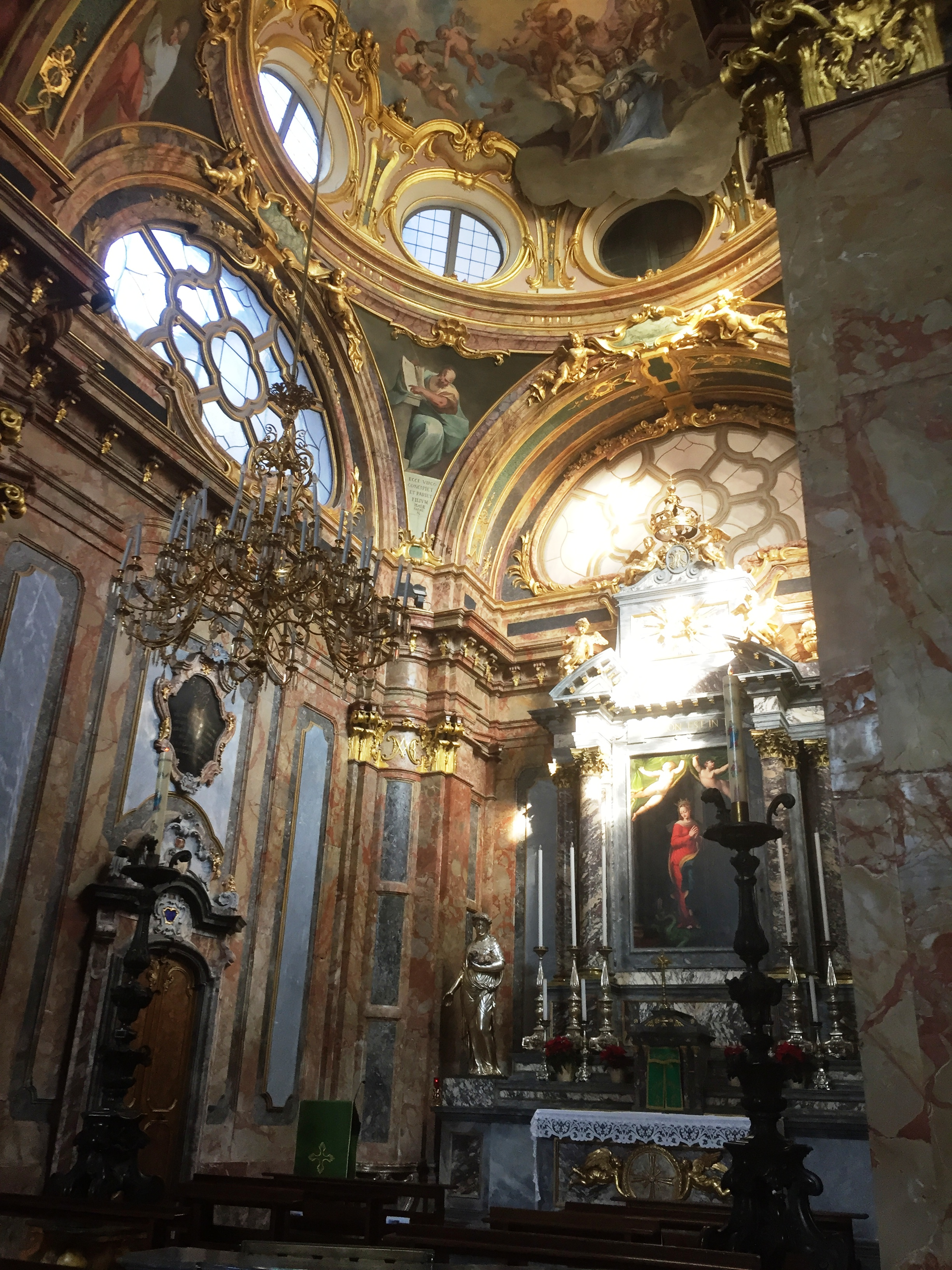
Chapel of the Immaculate Conception with frescoes by Pietro Antonio Magatti and altarpiece by Bernardino Ciceri

III chapel: originally dedicated to Saint Mary Magdalene, it was dedicated to the Holy Family in the eighteenth century. The Pavese aristocratic family of the Pietra had the patronage of the chapel, as evidenced by the rich baroque balustrades adorned with two bronze lions (symbol of the family). It contains an altarpiece depicting the Holy Family by Carlo Antonio Bianchi, while the entire left wall is occupied by an eighteenth-century stucco with Jesus among the doctors in the Temple. I chapel: previously dedicated first to Saint Christopher and then to the Madonna, it was later dedicated to Saint Joseph of Cupertino and preserves an altarpiece with the Ecstasy of Saint Joseph of Cupertino, a work of 1775 by Carlo Antonio Bianchi.

The first four bays of the left aisle, devoid of chapels, host four large canvases on the wall depicting episodes from the life of the Saint Mark. Two are the work of the Emilian painter Antonio Fratacci (18th century), one of the Bolognese Pietro Gilardi, while the one with Baptism given by Saint Peter in Saint Mark was painted by Pietro Antonio Magatti. On the same wall there are also the marble tombstones of friar Francesco del Mangano from 1469, still in the Gothic style, and that of friar Francesco della Somaglia (1508).

== Bibliography ==
- Carlo Cairati, Pavia viscontea. La capitale regia nel rinnovamento della cultura figurativa lombarda. Vol. 1: castello tra Galeazzo II e Gian Galeazzo (1359-1402), Milano, Scalpendi Editore, 2021.
- Cristina Molina, Antonio Rovelli, Hortus sanitatis.Arte, storia e virtù terapeutiche nel coro ligneo della chiesa di San Francesco d'Assisi in Pavia, Varzi, Guardamagna, 2012.
- Maria Teresa Mazzilli Savini, L'architettura gotica pavese, in Banca Regionale Europea (a cura di), Storia di Pavia. L’arte dall’XI al XVI secolo, III (tomo III), Milano, Industrie Grafiche P. M., 1996.
- Faustini Gianani, La chiesa di San Francesco Grande nella storia dell'arte, Pavia, Fusi, 1980.
