= Madonna and Child with Two Saints (Gentile da Fabriano) =

c. 1395 painting by Gentile da Fabriano

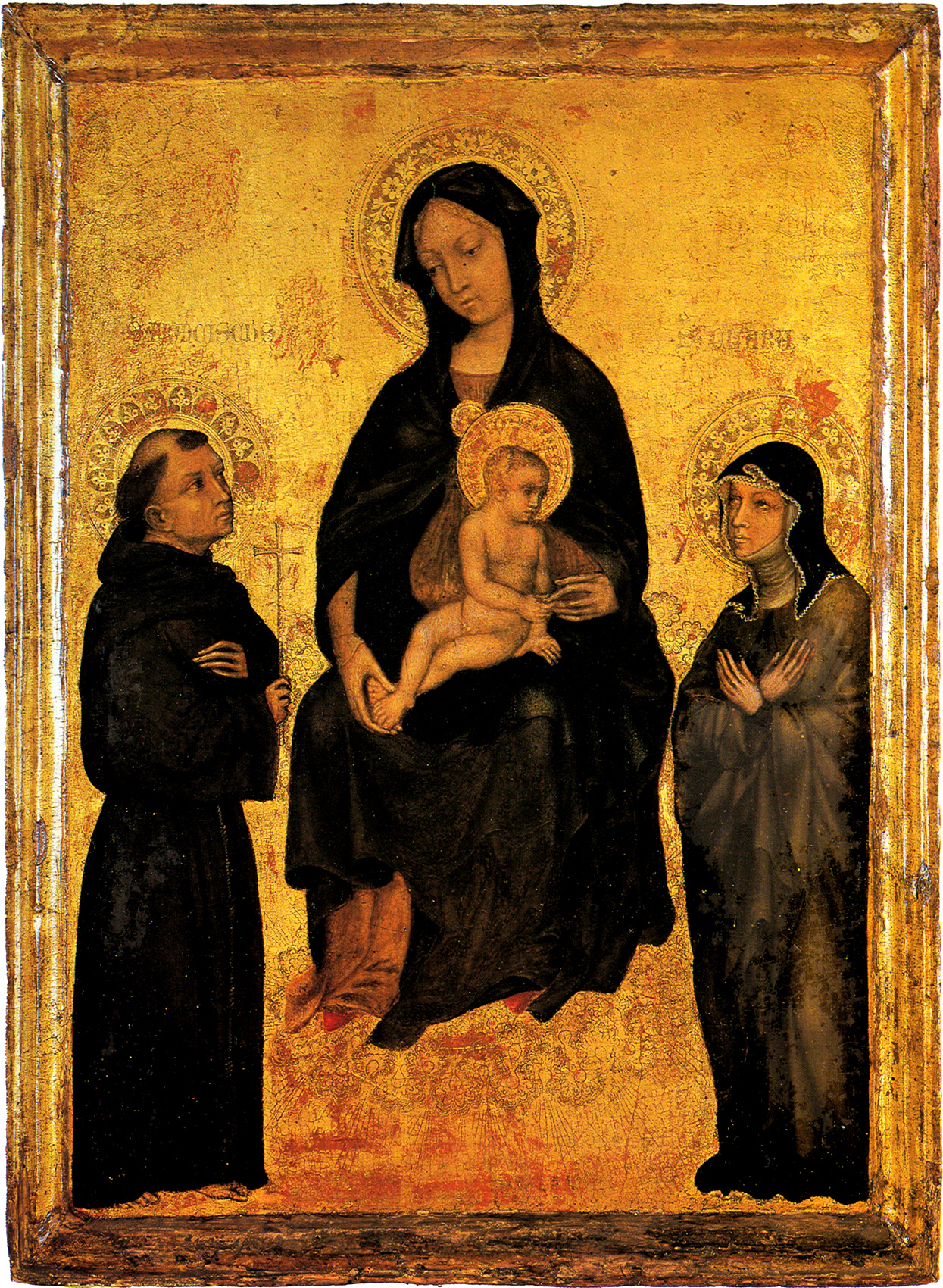
Madonna and Child with Two Saints (c. 1390–1395) by Gentile da Fabriano

Madonna and Child with Two Saints or Madonna and Child in Glory between Saint Francis and Saint Clare is a c.1390–1395 tempera and gold on panel painting by the Italian artist Gentile da Fabriano, now in the Pinacoteca Malaspina in Pavia. It is one of the earliest surviving works attributed to the artist.

It probably originated in the Santa Chiara la Reale monastery in Pavia, founded as a Franciscan house in 1380 by Bianca of Savoy. The gold-working is highly influenced by that of Giovannino de' Grassi.
