= Giuseppe Crastoni =

Italian painter

Giuseppe Crastoni or Gioseffo Crastone or Crastona (1674 in Pavia – 1718) was an Italian painter, mainly active as a landscape painter.

== Biography ==
He initially studied in Pavia under Bernardino Ciceri, then moved to Rome. He returned to Pavia to open a studio for teaching painting.
