= Gervasio Gatti =

Italian painter

Gervasio Gatti (c. 1550 in either Cremona, Vercelli or Pavia – c. 1631) was an Italian painter during the late-Renaissance, active in Parma, Piacenza, and Cremona. He was also known as Il Soiaro (or Sojaro). Gatti trained with his uncle Bernardino Gatti. He helped decorate the salons in the Rocca of San Secondo Parmense. He also studied with Correggio.

== Works ==
- Portrait of Margherita Aldobrandini
- Portrait of Alexander Farnese (uncertain)
- Transfiguration of Christ, San Francesco church, Pavia
- Martyr of Saint Catherine, Santa Maria Assunta and San Cristoforo in Castello churches in Viadana
- Martyr of Saint Stephen, Sant'Agata church, Cremona
- Saint Sebastian (San Sebastiano) (1578), Sant'Agata church, Cremona
- Martyr of Saint Cecilia (1601), San Pietro church, Cremona
