= Casa degli Eustachi =

Medieval palace in Italy

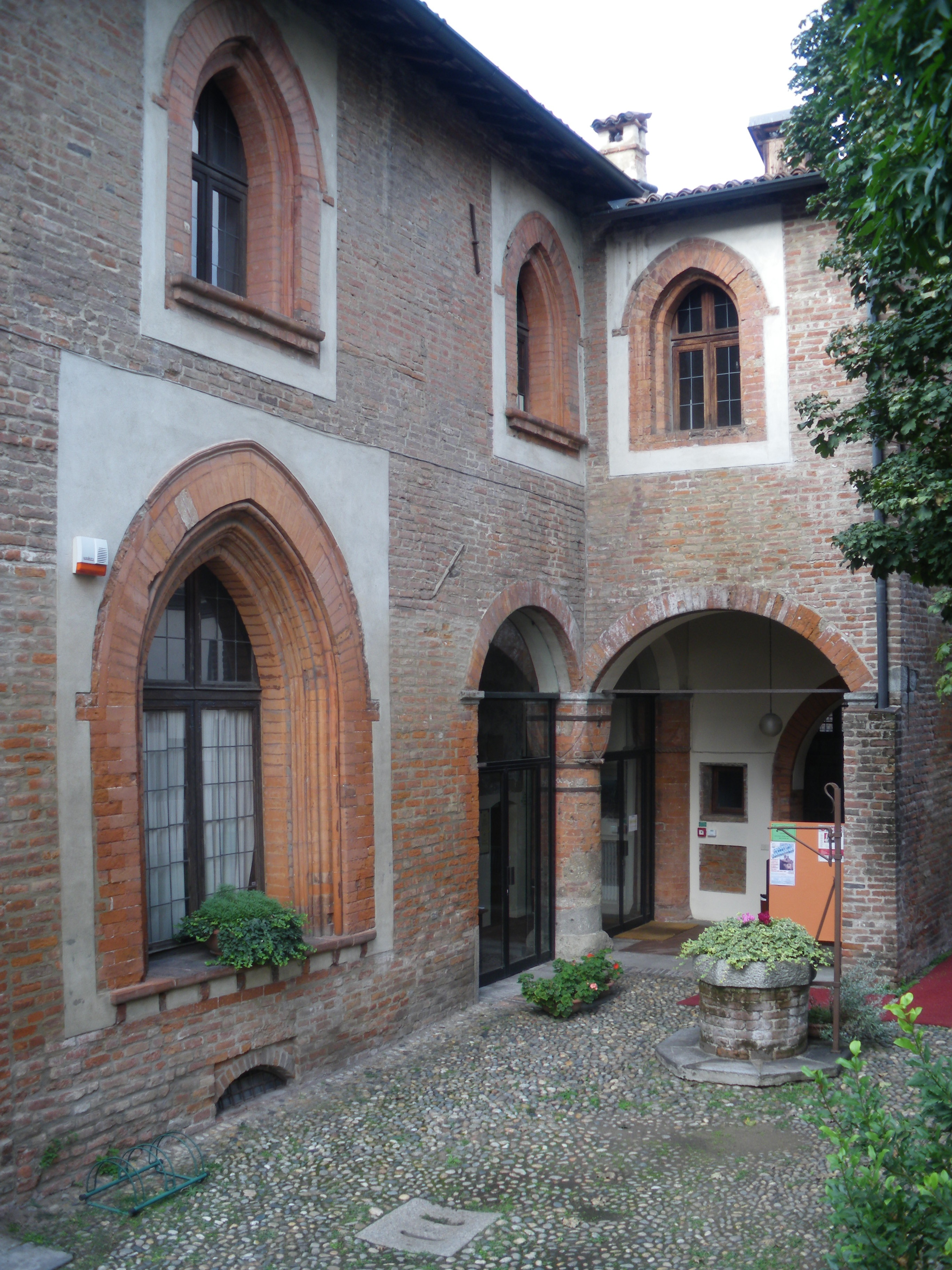
- The courtyard
- Interactive map of the Casa degli Eustachi area

General information
- Type: Palace
- Architectural style: Gothic
- Location: Pavia, Italy
- Coordinates: 45°10′57″N 9°9′04″E
- Opened: 15th century
- Owner: Comune di Pavia

The Casa degli Eustachi is a medieval palace in Pavia in Lombardy.

== History ==
The Eustachi house is located in the ancient district of Porta Calcinara, near the Ticino bank. The Eustachi family, of popular origin and dedicated to river traffic, during the fourteenth century became, working for the Visconti, one of the main city families, so much so that Pasino Eustachi became, under Gian Galeazzo and then of Filippo Maria, captain of the Visconti fleet and defeated the Venetian fleet on the Po in the important battle of Cremona in 1431. The house dates back to the early 15th century and is built around a small internal courtyard. Today, two "L" -shaped buildings remain of the structure, but it is assumed that it was much larger. Casa Eustachi now houses the University of the Third Age.

== Architecture ==
The building has an "L" planimetrically with the longer side to the west and the shorter side to the north, along the main street. The entire complex consists of a ground floor (to which the garden is attached in the rear part of the building) and a first floor. The ground floor consists of two large rooms with coffered wooden ceilings; one of the rooms is illuminated by a large Gothic window; the first room is accessed from the main entrance (on via porta Pertusi), consisting of a Gothic arched portal with a ring richly decorated with terracotta plant motifs and surmounted by a tile, decorated with rhomboidal geometric motifs, which was to house the coat of arms of the family. Even the large cylindrical column, which supports the two lowered arches of the portico, surmounted by a cubic capital, seems to be an architectural element linked to the tried and tested Romanesque construction tradition. Although the permanence of the late Gothic language continued in the Pavia area, and in Lombardy more generally, throughout the fifteenth century, it is also true that the planimetric configuration of the building and the refined workmanship of the architectural elements that make up the building are to be considered as modernity characters. In the case of the Casa degli Eustachi, the study of early fifteenth-century architecture gave results of considerable interest thanks to the integrity of the living organisms that have not undergone subsequent modifications or amalgamations.
