= Bernardino Gatti =

Italian painter (c. 1495 – 1576)

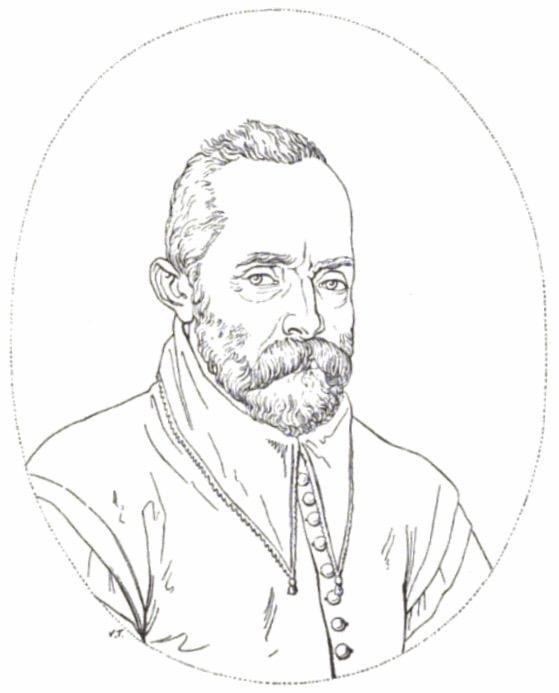
- Born: 1495
- Died: 22 February 1576; Cremona
- Occupation: Painter

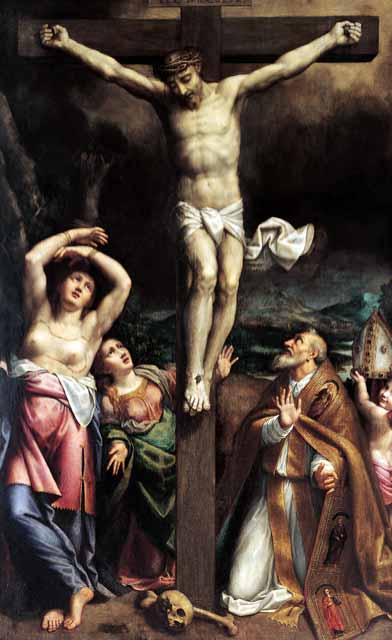
The crucifixion by Bernardino Gatti, located in the Parma cathedral

Bernardino Gatti (c. 1495 – 22 February 1576) was an Italian painter of the Renaissance, active mainly in Parma and Cremona. He is also commonly called Il Sojaro.

He was born in or near Pavia or Cremona. His early apprenticeship is unclear, though he was influenced by the pre-eminent local painters: Pordenone, alongside whose works are many of Gatti's frescoes, as well as Correggio. Gatti worked for 12 years, 1560–1572, in the fresco decoration of the cupola of the duomo of Parma, where he was assisted by Bartholomaeus Spranger. His major works are the large fresco in the refectory of San Pietro in Cremona from 1552, frescoes in the dome of the Santa Maria della Steccata (1560–1566) in Parma, and his Assunta in the Duomo of Cremona. He also worked in Pavia (1531) and Piacenza (1543). Among his most famous pupils are Sofonisba Anguissola and his nephew, Gervasio Gatti.

== Selected works ==
- Last Supper and Resurrection (1529), Cathedral of Cremona.
- Madonna of the Rosary (1531) Cathedral of Pavia.
- Life of the Virgin (1543), Basilica di Santa Maria di Campagna, Piacenza.
- Crucifixion with Mary Magdalen, Sant'Agata, San Bernardo degli Uberti, & Angel, (1566–1574), Chapel of Sant'Agata, Duomo of Parma.
- Assumption of Virgin (1560-1572), Sanctuary of Santa Maria della Steccata, Parma.
- Pietà, (Louvre)
- Multiplication of the Loaves and Fishes Refectory in San Pietro al Po, Cremona.
- Coronation Virgin with Saints Benedetto and Bernardo (1572), Abbey of Chiaravalle, Milan.
- Assunta (1572), Cathedral of Cremona

== Sources ==
- Getty Museum biography on Gatti
- Freedberg, Sydney J. (1993). Pelican History of Art (ed.). Painting in Italy, 1500-1600. Penguin Books. pp. 380–381. ISBN 0-14-056035-1
