= Bernardino Ciceri =

Italian painter

Bernardino Ciceri (born 1650) was an Italian painter of the Baroque period, active mainly in Pavia. He was a pupil of the painter Carlo Sacchi in Rome. One of his pupils was Gioseffo Cristona. He painted the Baptism of Christ for the church of Santa Maria del Carmine, Pavia.
