= Giovannino de' Grassi =

Italian artist

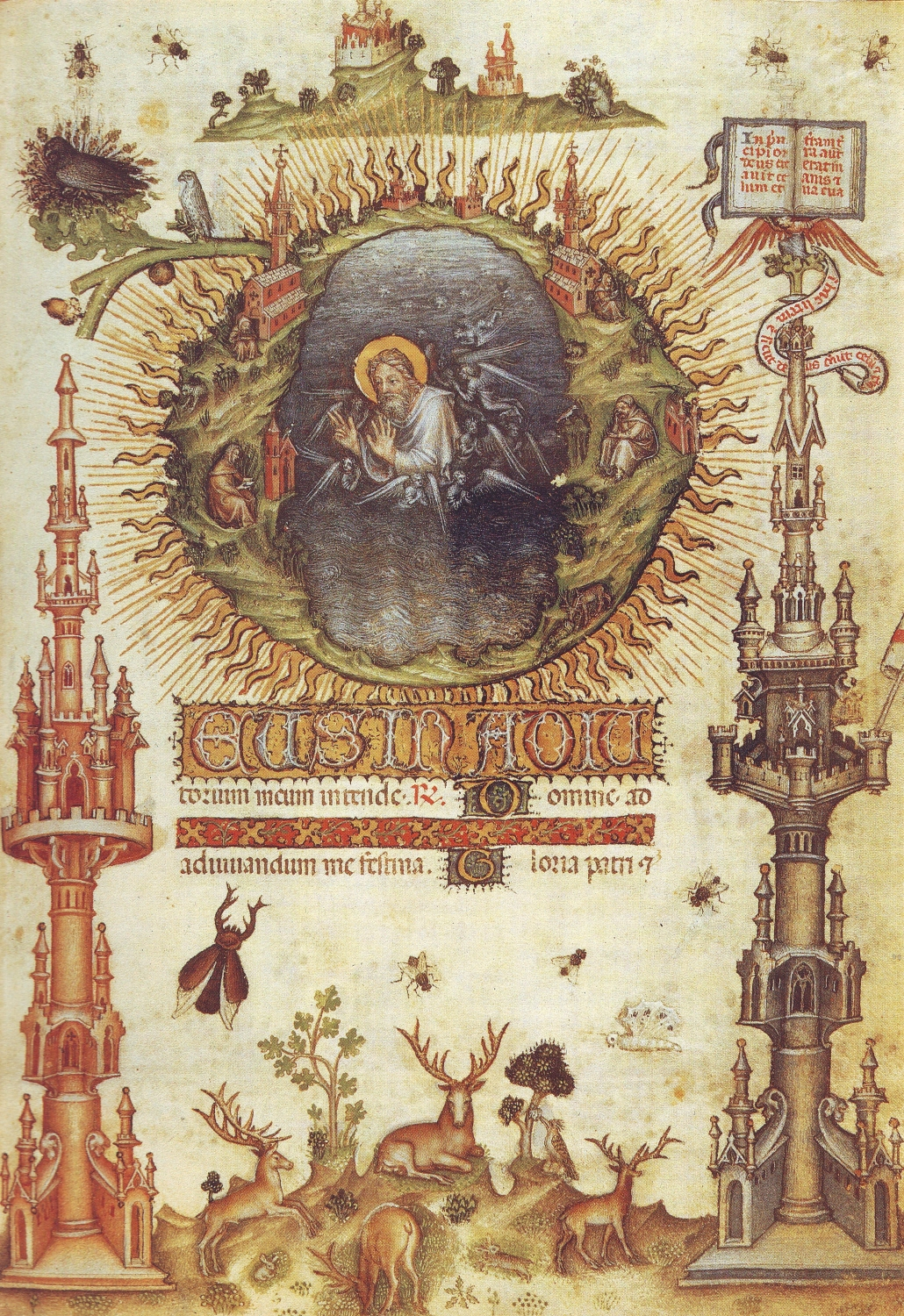
Office Book - God the Father and Hermit Saints

Giovannino de' Grassi (c.1350 – 6 July 1398) was an Italian architect, sculptor, painter and illuminator.

== Life ==
He was born in Milan, Italy, in the 14th century, although the year of his birth is uncertain. Nothing is known about his life before 1370.

Grassi was trained in Pavia by Pietro da Pavia.

He is known have made illuminated manuscripts for the Visconti family of Milan.

He collaborated with the Lombard architect Giacomo de Campione.

== Death ==
de Grassi died in 1398.
