= Palace Carminali Bottigella =

Medieval palace in Italy

- Palazzo Carminali Bottigella
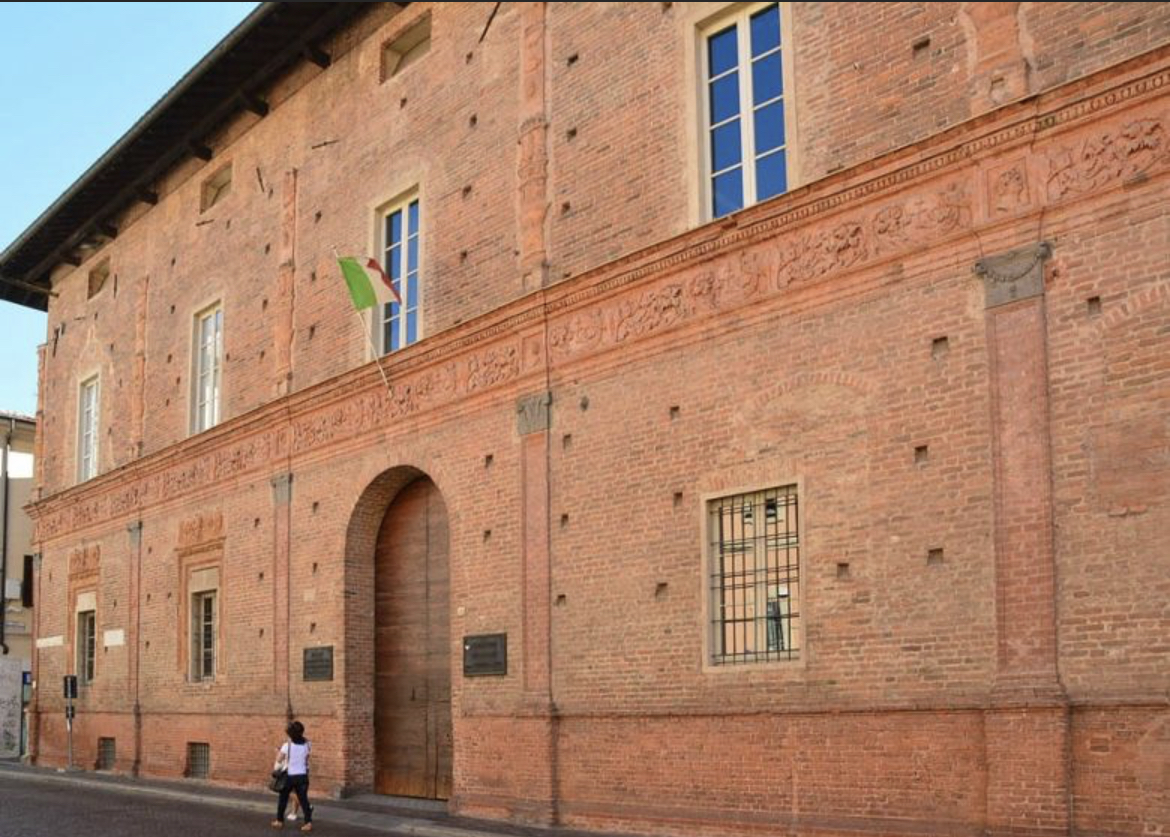
- The main façade of the palace on Via Luigi Porta, Pavia
- Interactive map of the Palace Carminali Bottigella area

General information
- Type: Palace
- Architectural style: Renaissance architecture
- Location: Pavia, Italy
- Coordinates: 45°11′10″N 9°09′03″E
- Opened: 1490–1499

Palace Carminali Bottigella (Italian: Palazzo Carminali Bottigella) is a noble palace in Pavia, originally built by the ancient Beccaria family. The structure, dating from the Sforza era, was constructed between 1490 and 1499. The façade, which retains its original terracotta decorations, is considered one of the most notable examples of Renaissance civil architecture in the city.

== History ==
The first owners of the building were the Beccarias, who at least from 1348 held a fair amount of real estate in the Porta Marenga district. In 1695 the building was purchased by Giovanni and Flavio Carminali, a family of noble merchants from Bergamo, who had been present in the city since the second half of the 16th century.

The Carminals moved their home here from their previous residence in Piazza Vittoria near the Church of Santa Maria Gualtieri. The new owners promoted important extension works of the house. The large Baroque staircase with two flights, adhering to the east side of the building, in fact bears the date 1696 engraved on the central pillar of the balustrade, adorned with 18 coats of arms. In 1763 the palace passed, by will of Pier Francesco Carminati, to his cousins Ottavio and Francesco Malaspina Giorgi di Sannazzaro and, in 1784, it was sold to Monsignor Antonio Picchiotti, the bishop's vicar, who in turn left it to his nephew Baldassarre Bottigella. In 1866, the residence was inherited by the Vicos and, after becoming the headquarters of the Casa del Fascio, in 1946 it passed to the Provincial Association of Merchants.

== Architecture ==
As regards its construction, attributions to Bramante and Giovanni Antonio Amadeo have been hypothesized. Some notarial deeds drawn up between 1491 and 1496 testify that in those years Andrea Beccaria and his brothers paid some Milanese stonecutters, Alessandro Bossi and Domenico Solari, then engaged in the reconstruction of the family's domus magna, and therefore probable that the current palace it replaced a previous stately home of the family (of which the tower remains, leaning against the western part of the façade, now trimmed and reduced to the same height as the building). The works for the construction of the building were however directed by the ducal engineer Martino Fugazza. The façade overlooking Corso Cavour is entirely in brick and was not completed, however, what exists is sufficiently indicative of the intentions of the designer. The surface, extended to two floors above ground plus one under the eaves, remained entirely in exposed brick, is divided into two parts by the large string course in terracotta, decorated with plant motifs with interspersed coats of arms and profiles of characters marked by a typically Renaissance taste. This string course is ideally supported by terracotta pilasters with marble capitals on the ground floor. And in turn it holds as many candelabra-columns, always in terracotta. Each of the backgrounds thus obtained (which perhaps originally should have been plastered) was intended to house a window, surrounded by a frame, surmounted by a decoration with fauns and bucrania, also in terracotta. However, only the two at the left end of the ground floor were completed, while on the first floor both the size and the arched shape that can be read in the traces of the original openings would suggest the intention of placing mullioned windows. This party can in part recall others belonging to palaces in the Po Valley but not in Pavia: above all Palazzo Mozzanica in Lodi and Palazzo Landi in Piacenza, both of which have a similar horizontal band dividing the lower area from the upper part, but have neither pilasters or candelabra-columns. The interiors were extensively remodeled between the seventeenth and eighteenth centuries and retain Baroque stuccos and frescoes, while in the middle of the great staircase, the fifteenth-century funerary slabs of members of the Bottigella family from the church San Tommaso are preserved.

== Gallery ==
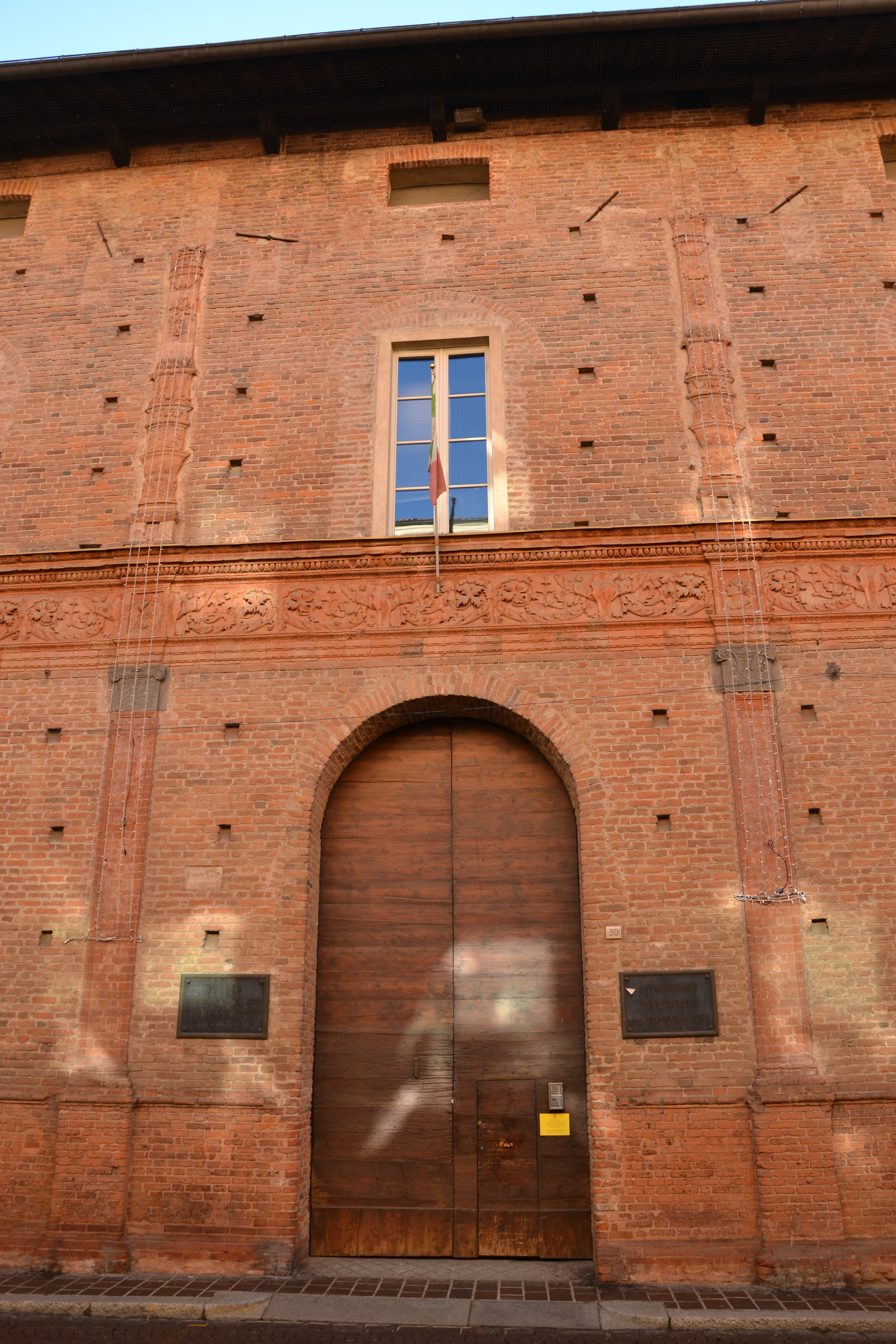
The portal of the palace

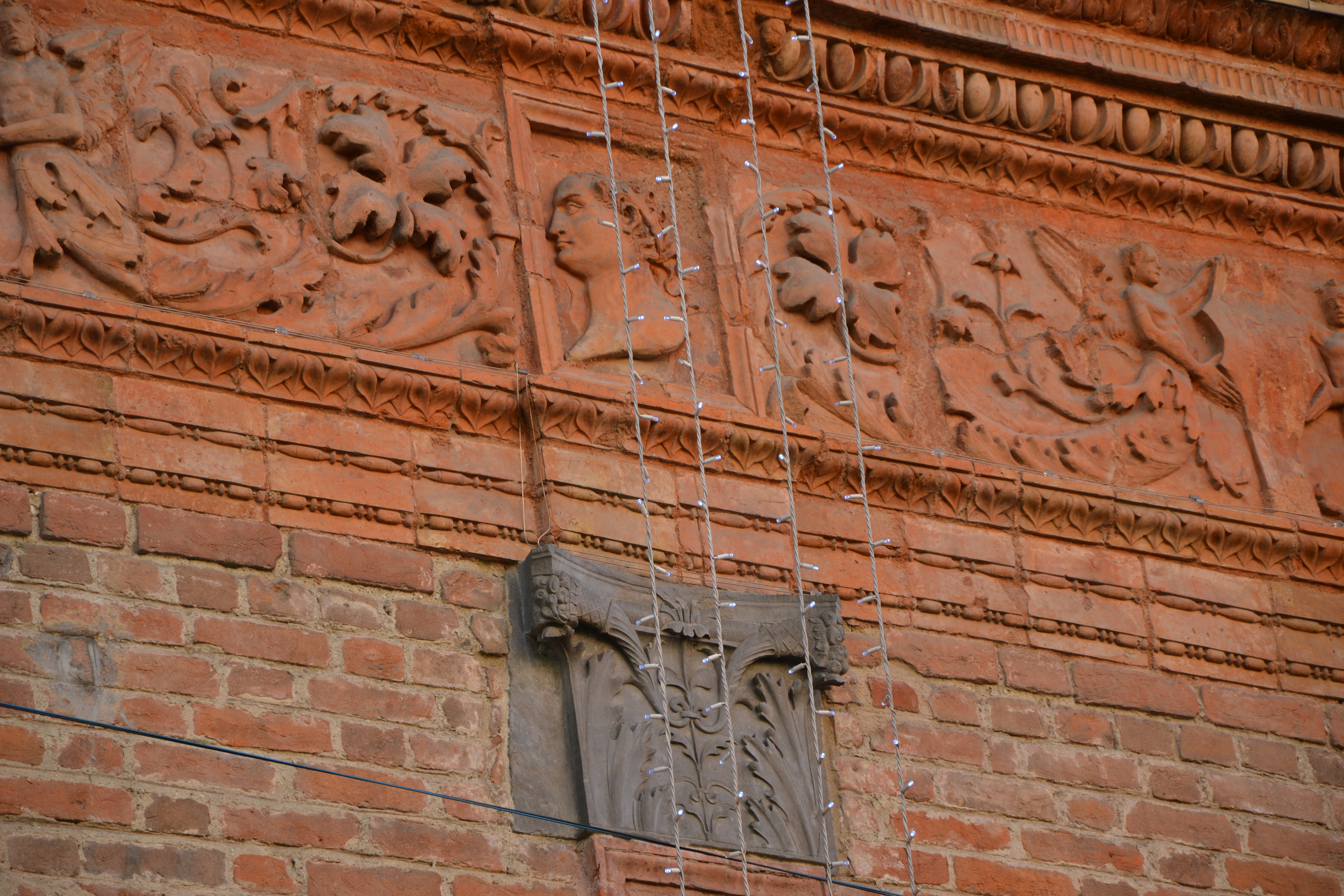
Façade decorations: detail.

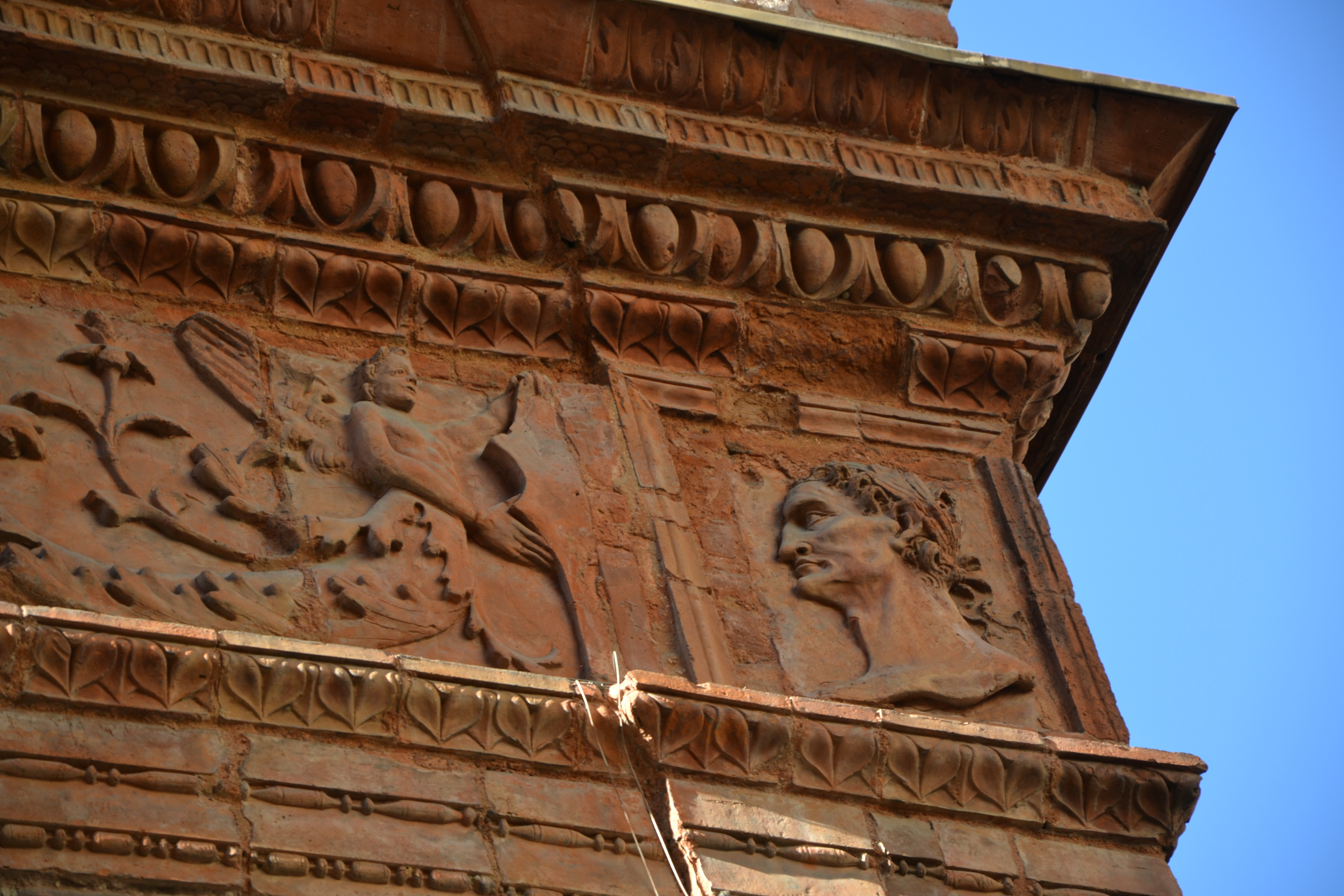
Façade decorations: detail.

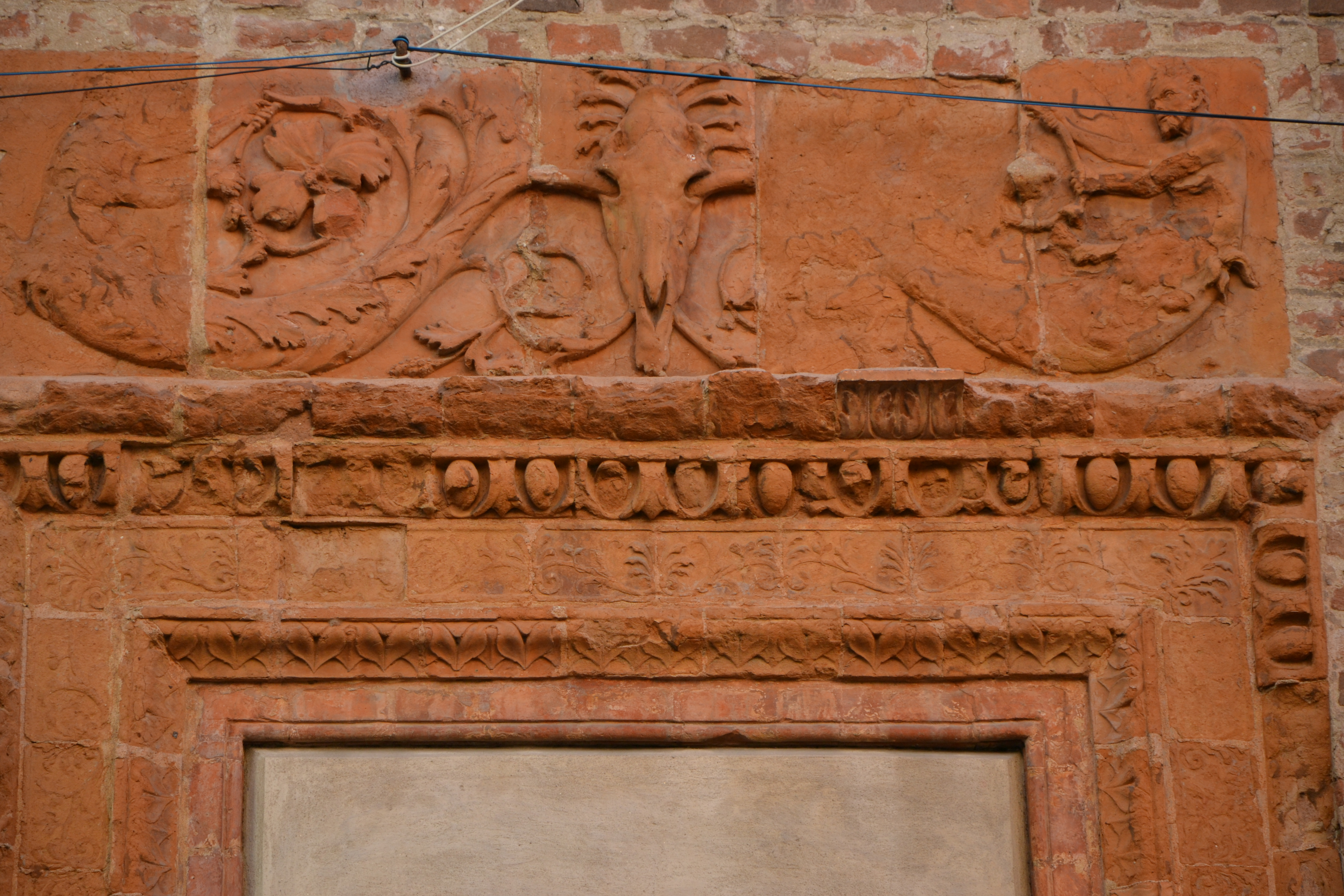
The decoration of the windows.

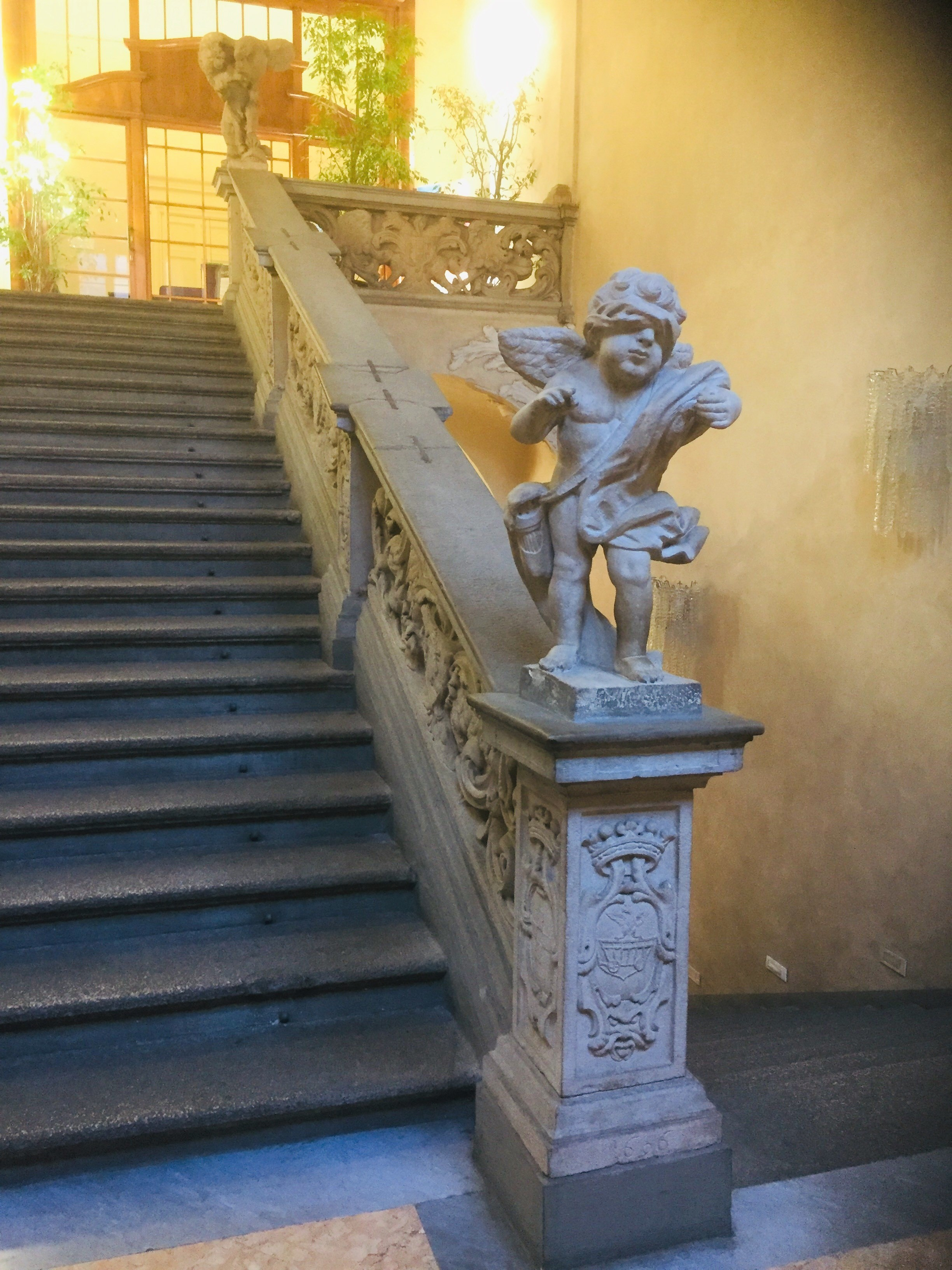
The Baroque staircase (1696).
