= March 19 =

March 19 this year in various calendars
- Thursday, 19 March 2026
Other calendars
| Armenian | 2 Ahekani 1475 |
| Aztec | Huei Tecuilhuitl 8, 4 Cōzcacuāuhtli |
| Babylonian | 29 Shabatu, 2336 SE |
| Balinese pawukon | Menga, Beteng, Menala, Keliwon, Aryang, Wraspati of Kelawu, Uma, Jangur, Manusa |
| Bengali | 7 Bhadro, BS 1433 |
| Chinese | Yang Water Dragon・Legs Mansion -146 Qīyuè, Bǐngwǔnián (Jingzhe, 1 day until Chunfen) |
| Common Era | 19 March 2026 CE |
| Coptic | 10 Paremhat, AM 1742 |
| Egyptian | 7 Mesori, 2774 NE |
| Ethiopian | 10 Magābit, 2018 Amätä Məhrät |
| French Republican | Décade III, Nonidi de Ventôse de l'Année 234 de la République |
| Gregorian | 19 March, AD 2026 |
| Hebrew | 1 Nisan, AM 5786 |
| Icelandic | Fimmtudagur, 26 Góa 2025 |
| Islamic | 30 Ramadan, AH 1447 (using tabular method) |
| ISO week date | 2026-W12-4 |
| Japanese | 1 Kisaragi, Reiwa 8 (Keichitsu, 1 day until Shunbun) |
| Julian | 6 March, AD 2026 (AM 7534) |
| Julian day | 2461119 |
| Maya | 13.0.13.7.16; 14 Cumku, 4 Cib |
| Roman | Pridie Nonas Martias, MMDCCLXXIX AUC |
| Solar Hijri | 28 Esfand, SH 1404 |

| << | March | | | | | >> |
| Su | Mo | Tu | We | Th | Fr | Sa |
| 1 | 2 | 3 | 4 | 5 | 6 | 7 |
| 8 | 9 | 10 | 11 | 12 | 13 | 14 |
| 15 | 16 | 17 | 18 | 19 | 20 | 21 |
| 22 | 23 | 24 | 25 | 26 | 27 | 28 |
| 29 | 30 | 31 |
2026

March 19 in recent years
2026 (Thursday)
2025 (Wednesday)
2024 (Tuesday)
2023 (Sunday)
2022 (Saturday)
2021 (Friday)
2020 (Thursday)
2019 (Tuesday)
2018 (Monday)
2017 (Sunday)

March 19 is the 78th day of the year (79th in leap years) in the Gregorian calendar; 287 days remain until the end of the year.

== Events ==
=== Pre-1600 ===
- 1205 – Latin forces under Henry of Flanders defeat a Nicaean army under Constantine Laskaris in the Battle of Adramyttion.
- 1227 – Election of Ugolino di Conti as Pope Gregory IX following the death of Pope Honorius III.
- 1277 – The Byzantine–Venetian treaty of 1277 is concluded, stipulating a two-year truce and renewing Venetian commercial privileges in the Byzantine Empire.
- 1279 – A Mongol victory at the Battle of Yamen ends the Song dynasty in China.
- 1284 – The Statute of Rhuddlan incorporates the Principality of Wales into England.
- 1452 – Frederick III of Habsburg is the last Holy Roman Emperor crowned by medieval tradition in Rome by Pope Nicholas V.
- 1563 – The Edict of Amboise is signed, ending the first phase of the French Wars of Religion and granting certain freedoms to the Huguenots.

=== 1601–1900 ===
- 1649 – The House of Commons of England passes an act abolishing the House of Lords, declaring it "useless and dangerous to the people of England".
- 1687 – Explorer Robert Cavelier de La Salle, searching for the mouth of the Mississippi River, is murdered by his own men.
- 1808 – Charles IV, king of Spain, abdicates after riots and a popular revolt at the winter palace Aranjuez. His son, Ferdinand VII, takes the throne.
- 1812 – The Cortes of Cádiz promulgates the Spanish Constitution of 1812.
- 1824 – American explorer Benjamin Morrell departs Antarctica after a voyage later plagued by claims of fraud.
- 1831 – First documented bank heist in U.S. history, when burglars steal $245,000 (1831 values) from the City Bank (now Citibank) on Wall Street. Most of the money was recovered.
- 1865 – American Civil War: The Battle of Bentonville begins. By the end of the battle two days later, Confederate forces had retreated from Four Oaks, North Carolina.
- 1885 – Louis Riel declares a provisional government in Saskatchewan, beginning the North-West Rebellion.

=== 1901–present ===
- 1918 – The US Congress establishes time zones and approves daylight saving time.
- 1920 – The United States Senate rejects the Treaty of Versailles for the second time (the first time was on November 19, 1919).
- 1921 – Irish War of Independence: One of the biggest engagements of the war takes place at Crossbarry, County Cork. About 100 Irish Republican Army (IRA) volunteers escape an attempt by over 1,300 British forces to encircle them.
- 1932 – The Sydney Harbour Bridge is opened.
- 1943 – Frank Nitti, the Chicago Outfit Boss after Al Capone, commits suicide at the Chicago Central Railyard.
- 1944 – World War II: The German army occupies Hungary.
- 1945 – World War II: Off the coast of Japan, a dive bomber hits the aircraft carrier USS Franklin, killing 724 of her crew. Badly damaged, the ship is able to return to the US under her own power.
- 1945 – World War II: Adolf Hitler issues his "Nero Decree" ordering all industries, military installations, shops, transportation facilities, and communications facilities in Germany to be destroyed.
- 1946 – French Guiana, Guadeloupe, Martinique, and Réunion become overseas départements of France.
- 1958 – The Monarch Underwear Company fire leaves 24 dead and 15 injured.
- 1962 – The Algerian War of Independence ends.
- 1964 – Over 500,000 Brazilians attend the March of the Family with God for Liberty, in protest against the government of João Goulart and against communism.
- 1965 – The wreck of the SS Georgiana, valued at over $50,000,000 and said to have been the most powerful Confederate cruiser, is discovered by teenage diver and pioneer underwater archaeologist E. Lee Spence, exactly 102 years after its destruction.
- 1969 – The 385-metre-tall (1,263 ft) TV-mast at Emley Moor transmitting station, United Kingdom, collapses due to ice build-up.
- 1979 – The United States House of Representatives begins broadcasting its day-to-day business via the cable television network C-SPAN.
- 1982 – Falklands War: Argentinian forces land on South Georgia Island, precipitating war with the United Kingdom.
- 1989 – The Egyptian flag is raised at Taba, marking the end of Israeli occupation since the Six Days War in 1967 and the Egypt–Israel peace treaty in 1979.
- 1990 – The ethnic clashes of Târgu Mureș begin four days after the anniversary of the Revolutions of 1848 in the Austrian Empire.
- 1998 – An Ariana Afghan Airlines Boeing 727 crashes on approach to Kabul International Airport, killing all 45 on board.
- 2003 – United States President George W. Bush addresses the nation, announcing the invasion of Iraq.
- 2004 – Catalina affair: A Swedish DC-3 shot down by a Soviet MiG-15 in 1952 over the Baltic Sea is finally recovered after years of work.
- 2004 – March 19 Shooting Incident: The Republic of China (Taiwan) president Chen Shui-bian is shot just before the country's presidential election on March 20.
- 2004 – The Konginkangas bus disaster kills 23 and injures 14 people in Äänekoski, Finland.
- 2008 – GRB 080319B: A cosmic burst that is the farthest object visible to the naked eye is briefly observed.
- 2011 – Libyan Civil War: After the failure of Muammar Gaddafi's forces to take Benghazi, the French Air Force launches Opération Harmattan, beginning foreign military intervention in Libya.
- 2013 – A series of bombings and shootings kills at least 98 people and injures 240 others across Iraq.
- 2016 – Flydubai Flight 981 crashes while attempting to land at Rostov-on-Don international airport, killing all 62 on board.
- 2016 – An explosion occurs in Taksim Square in Istanbul, Turkey, killing five people and injuring 36.
- 2019 – The first President of Kazakhstan, Nursultan Nazarbayev, resigns from office after nearly three decades, leaving Senate Chairman Kassym-Jomart Tokayev as the acting President and successor.
- 2023 – The Swiss Government brokers a deal for UBS to buy out rival Credit Suisse in an attempt to calm the 2023 banking crisis.

== Births ==
=== Pre-1600 ===
- 1206 – Güyük Khan, Mongol ruler, 3rd Great Khan of the Mongol Empire (died 1248)
- 1434 – Ashikaga Yoshikatsu, Japanese shōgun (died 1443)
- 1488 – Johannes Magnus, Swedish archbishop and theologian (died 1544)
- 1534 – José de Anchieta, Spanish missionary and saint (died 1597)
- 1542 – Jan Zamoyski, Polish nobleman (died 1605)

=== 1601–1900 ===
- 1601 – Alonso Cano, Spanish painter, sculptor, and architect (died 1667)
- 1604 – John IV of Portugal (died 1656)
- 1641 – Abd al-Ghani al-Nabulsi, Syrian author and scholar (died 1731)
- 1661 – Francesco Gasparini, Italian composer and educator (died 1727)
- 1684 – Jean Astruc, French physician and scholar (died 1766)
- 1721 – Tobias Smollett, Scottish-Italian poet and author (died 1771) (baptised on this day)
- 1734 – Thomas McKean, American lawyer and politician, 2nd Governor of Pennsylvania (died 1817)
- 1739 – Charles-François Lebrun, duc de Plaisance, French lawyer and politician (died 1824)
- 1742 – Túpac Amaru II, Peruvian rebel leader (died 1781)
- 1748 – Elias Hicks, American farmer, minister, and theologian (died 1830)
- 1778 – Edward Pakenham, Anglo-Irish general and politician (died 1815)
- 1784 – José Prudencio Padilla López, Colombian naval commander and politician (died 1828)
- 1809 – Fredrik Pacius, German composer and conductor (died 1891)
- 1813 – David Livingstone, Scottish missionary and explorer (died 1873)
- 1816 – Johannes Verhulst, Dutch composer and conductor (died 1891)
- 1821 – Richard Francis Burton, English soldier, geographer, and diplomat (died 1890)
- 1823 – Arthur Blyth, English-Australian politician, 9th Premier of South Australia (died 1891)
- 1824 – William Allingham, Irish poet, author, and scholar (died 1889)
- 1829 – Carl Frederik Tietgen, Danish businessman (died 1901)
- 1844 – Minna Canth, Finnish journalist, playwright, and activist (died 1897)
- 1847 – Albert Pinkham Ryder, American painter (died 1917)
- 1848 – Wyatt Earp, American police officer (died 1929)
- 1849 – Alfred von Tirpitz, German admiral and politician (died 1930)
- 1858 – Kang Youwei, Chinese scholar and politician (died 1927)
- 1860 – William Jennings Bryan, American lawyer and politician, 41st United States Secretary of State (died 1925)
- 1861 – Lomer Gouin, Canadian lawyer and politician, Premier of Quebec (died 1929)
- 1864 – Charles Marion Russell, American painter and sculptor (died 1926)
- 1865 – William Morton Wheeler, American entomologist, myrmecologist, and academic (died 1937)
- 1868 – Senda Berenson Abbott, Lithuanian-American basketball player and educator (died 1954)
- 1871 – Schofield Haigh, English cricketer and coach (died 1921)
- 1872 – Anna Held, Polish singer (died 1918)
- 1873 – Max Reger, German pianist, composer, and conductor (died 1916)
- 1875 – Zhang Zuolin, Chinese warlord (died 1928)
- 1876 – Felix Jacoby, German philologist (died 1959)
- 1880 – Ernestine Rose, American librarian and advocate (died 1961)
- 1881 – Edith Nourse Rogers, American social worker and politician (died 1960)
- 1882 – Gaston Lachaise, French-American sculptor (died 1935)
- 1883 – Norman Haworth, English chemist and academic, Nobel Prize laureate (died 1950)
- 1883 – Joseph Stilwell, American general (died 1946)
- 1885 – Attik, Greek composer (died 1944)
- 1888 – Josef Albers, German-American painter and educator (died 1976)
- 1888 – Léon Scieur, Belgian cyclist (died 1969)
- 1891 – Earl Warren, American lieutenant, jurist, and politician, 14th Chief Justice of the United States (died 1974)
- 1892 – Theodore Sizer, American professor of the history of art (died 1967)
- 1892 – Ado Vabbe, Estonian painter (died 1961)
- 1892 – James Van Fleet, American general and diplomat (died 1992)
- 1893 – Gertrud Dorka, German archaeologist, prehistorian and museum director (died 1976)
- 1894 – Moms Mabley, American comedian and singer (died 1975)
- 1900 – Carmen Carbonell, Spanish stage and film actress (died 1988)
- 1900 – Frédéric Joliot-Curie, French physicist and academic, Nobel Prize laureate (died 1958)

=== 1901–present ===
- 1901 – Jo Mielziner, French-American set designer (died 1976)
- 1905 – Joe Rollino, American weightlifter and boxer (died 2010)
- 1905 – Albert Speer, German architect and politician, convicted Nuremberg war criminal (died 1981)
- 1906 – Clara Breed, American librarian and activist (died 1994)
- 1906 – Adolf Eichmann, German SS officer, one of the main organizers of the Holocaust (died 1962)
- 1907 – Elizabeth Maconchy, British/Irish composer (died 1994)
- 1909 – Louis Hayward, South African-American actor (died 1985)
- 1909 – Marjorie Linklater, Scottish campaigner for the arts and environment of Orkney (died 1997)
- 1910 – Joseph Carroll, American general (died 1991)
- 1912 – Hugh Watt, Australian-New Zealand engineer and politician, Prime Minister of New Zealand (died 1980)
- 1914 – Leonidas Alaoglu, Canadian-American mathematician and theorist (died 1981)
- 1914 – Jay Berwanger, American football player and coach (died 2002)
- 1915 – Robert G. Cole, American colonel, Medal of Honor recipient (died 1944)
- 1915 – Patricia Morison, American actress and singer (died 2018)
- 1916 – Eric Christmas, English-Canadian actor (died 2000)
- 1916 – Irving Wallace, American journalist, author, and screenwriter (died 1990)
- 1917 – Laszlo Szabo, Hungarian chess player (died 1998)
- 1919 – Lennie Tristano, American pianist, composer, and educator (died 1978)
- 1920 – Kjell Aukrust, Norwegian author, poet, and painter (died 2002)
- 1921 – Tommy Cooper, British magician and prop comedian (died 1984)
- 1922 – Guy Lewis, American basketball player and coach (died 2015)
- 1922 – Hiroo Onoda, Japanese lieutenant (died 2014)
- 1923 – Pamela Britton, American actress (died 1974)
- 1923 – Benito Jacovitti, Italian illustrator (died 1997)
- 1923 – Henry Morgentaler, Polish-Canadian physician and activist (died 2013)
- 1924 – Joe Gaetjens, Haitian footballer (died 1964)
- 1925 – Brent Scowcroft, American general and diplomat, 9th United States National Security Advisor (died 2020)
- 1927 – Richie Ashburn, American baseball player and sportscaster (died 1997)
- 1928 – Hans Küng, Swiss theologian and author (died 2021)
- 1928 – Patrick McGoohan, Irish-American actor, director, producer, and screenwriter (died 2009)
- 1931 – Emma Andijewska, Ukrainian poet, writer and painter
- 1932 – Gay Brewer, American golfer (died 2007)
- 1932 – Peter Hall, English geographer, author, and academic (died 2014)
- 1932 – Gail Kobe, American actress and producer (died 2013)
- 1933 – Richard Williams, Canadian-English animator, director, and screenwriter (died 2019)
- 1935 – Nancy Malone, American actress, director, and producer (died 2014)
- 1936 – Ben Lexcen, Australian sailor and architect (died 1988)
- 1937 – Egon Krenz, German politician, briefly leader of East Germany
- 1938 – Joe Kapp, American football player, coach, and actor (died 2023)
- 1942 – Heather Robertson, Canadian journalist and author (died 2014)
- 1943 – Nate Bowman, American basketball player (died 1984)
- 1943 – Mario J. Molina, Mexican chemist and academic, Nobel Prize laureate (died 2020)
- 1943 – Mario Monti, Italian economist and politician, Prime Minister of Italy
- 1943 – Vern Schuppan, Australian race car driver
- 1944 – Said Musa, Belizean lawyer and politician, 5th Prime Minister of Belize
- 1944 – Sirhan Sirhan, Palestinian-Jordanian assassin of Robert F. Kennedy
- 1945 – John Holder, English cricketer and umpire
- 1945 – Modestas Paulauskas, Lithuanian basketball player and coach
- 1946 – Ruth Pointer, American musician
- 1947 – Marinho Peres, Brazilian footballer and coach (died 2023)
- 1948 – David Schnitter, American saxophonist and educator
- 1949 – Blase J. Cupich, American theologian and cardinal
- 1950 – José S. Palma, Filipino archbishop
- 1952 – Warren Lees, New Zealand cricketer and coach
- 1952 – Martin Ravallion, Australian economist and academic (died 2022)
- 1953 – Ian Blair, English police officer (died 2025)
- 1953 – Peter Hendy, English businessman, Minister of State for Rail
- 1953 – Ricky Wilson, American singer-songwriter and musician (died 1985)
- 1954 – Cho Kwang-rae, South Korean footballer, coach, and manager
- 1954 – Scott May, American basketball player
- 1956 – Yegor Gaidar, Russian economist and politician, First Deputy Prime Minister of Russia (died 2009)
- 1957 – Dudley Bradley, American basketball player
- 1958 – Andy Reid, American football player and coach
- 1960 – Eliane Elias, Brazilian singer-songwriter and pianist
- 1963 – Neil LaBute, American director and screenwriter
- 1964 – Yoko Kanno, Japanese pianist and composer
- 1966 – Michael Crockart, Scottish police officer and politician
- 1966 – Olaf Marschall, German footballer and manager
- 1966 – Andy Sinton, English footballer and manager
- 1967 – Sandra Dombrowski, Swiss ice hockey player and referee
- 1967 – Vladimir Konstantinov, Russian-American ice hockey player
- 1968 – Tyrone Hill, American basketball player and coach
- 1970 – Harald Johnsen, Norwegian bassist and composer (died 2011)
- 1970 – Michael Krumm, German race car driver
- 1970 – Janne Laukkanen, Finnish ice hockey player
- 1973 – Ashley Giles, English cricketer and coach
- 1975 – Antonio Daniels, American basketball player
- 1976 – Derek Chauvin, American criminal and former police officer
- 1976 – Andre Miller, American basketball player
- 1976 – Alessandro Nesta, Italian footballer and manager
- 1977 – David Ross, American baseball player and manager
- 1978 – Cydonie Mothersille, Jamaican-Caymanian sprinter
- 1979 – Sheldon Brown, American football player
- 1979 – Ivan Ljubičić, Croatian tennis player
- 1979 – Christos Patsatzoglou, Greek footballer
- 1979 – Hedo Türkoğlu, Turkish basketball player
- 1980 – Luca Ferri, Italian footballer
- 1980 – Taichi Ishikari, Japanese wrestler
- 1980 – Mikuni Shimokawa, Japanese singer-songwriter
- 1980 – Theo Von, American stand-up comedian
- 1981 – Steve Cummings, English cyclist
- 1981 – Casey Jacobsen, American basketball player and sportscaster
- 1981 – Kolo Touré, Ivorian footballer
- 1982 – Jonathan Fanene, American football player
- 1982 – Brad Jones, Australian footballer
- 1982 – Hana Kobayashi, Venezuelan singer
- 1982 – Landon Powell, American baseball player and manager
- 1986 – Tyler Bozak, Canadian ice hockey player
- 1986 – Ahmad Bradshaw, American football player
- 1987 – AJ Lee, American wrestler and author
- 1987 – Michal Švec, Czech footballer
- 1987 – Miloš Teodosić, Serbian basketball player
- 1988 – Clayton Kershaw, American baseball player
- 1988 – Ben Uzoh, Nigerian-American basketball player
- 1990 – EJ Manuel, American football player
- 1990 – Anders Nilsson, Swedish ice hockey player
- 1991 – Aleksandr Kokorin, Russian footballer
- 1993 – Hakim Ziyech, Moroccan footballer
- 1995 – Héctor Bellerín, Spanish footballer
- 1995 – Julia Montes, Filipino actress
- 1996 – Yung Gravy, American rapper
- 1996 – Barbara Haas, Austrian tennis player
- 1996 – Quenton Nelson, American football player
- 1998 – Caylee Cowan, American actress
- 1998 – Julian Love, American football player
- 1998 – Sakura Miyawaki, Japanese singer
- 1999 – Nico Collins, American football player

== Deaths ==
=== Pre-1600 ===
- 235 – Severus Alexander, Roman emperor (born 208)
- 953 – al-Mansur bi-Nasr Allah, caliph of the Fatimid Caliphate (born 913)
- 968 – Emma of Paris, duchess of Normandy (born 943)
- 1238 – Henry the Bearded, Polish duke and son of Bolesław I the Tall (born 1163)
- 1263 – Hugh of Saint-Cher, French cardinal (born 1200)
- 1279 – Zhao Bing, Chinese emperor (born 1271)
- 1286 – Alexander III, king of Scotland (born 1241)
- 1330 – Edmund of Woodstock, 1st Earl of Kent, English politician, Lord Warden of the Cinque Ports (born 1301)
- 1372 – John II, marquess of Montferrat (born 1321)
- 1533 – John Bourchier, 2nd Baron Berners, English baron and statesman (born 1467)
- 1534 – Michael Weiße, German theologian (born c. 1488)
- 1539 – Lord Edmund Howard, English nobleman (born c. 1478)
- 1563 – Arthur Brooke, English poet
- 1568 – Elizabeth Seymour, Lady Cromwell, English noblewoman (bornc. 1518)
- 1581 – Francis I, duke of Saxe-Lauenburg (born 1510)

=== 1601–1900 ===
- 1612 – Sophia Olelkovich Radziwill, Belarusian saint (born 1585)
- 1637 – Péter Pázmány, Hungarian cardinal (born 1570)
- 1649 – Gerhard Johann Vossius, German scholar and theologian (born 1577)
- 1683 – Thomas Killigrew, English playwright and manager (born 1612)
- 1687 – René-Robert Cavelier, Sieur de La Salle, French-American explorer (born 1643)
- 1697 – Nicolaus Bruhns, German organist and composer (born 1665)
- 1711 – Thomas Ken, English bishop and hymn-writer (born 1637)
- 1717 – John Campbell, 1st Earl of Breadalbane and Holland, Scottish soldier (born 1636)
- 1721 – Pope Clement XI (born 1649)
- 1783 – Frederick Cornwallis, English archbishop (born 1713)
- 1790 – Cezayirli Gazi Hasan Pasha, Ottoman general and politician, 182nd Grand Vizier of the Ottoman Empire (born 1713)
- 1797 – Philip Hayes, English organist and composer (born 1738)
- 1816 – Filippo Mazzei, Italian-American physician and philosopher (born 1730)
- 1871 – Wilhelm Karl Ritter von Haidinger, Austrian mineralogist, geologist, and physicist (born 1795)
- 1884 – Elias Lönnrot, Finnish physician and philologist (born 1802)
- 1897 – Antoine Thomson d'Abbadie, Irish-French geographer, ethnologist, linguist, and astronomer (born 1810)
- 1900 – John Bingham, American lawyer and politician, 7th United States Ambassador to Japan (born 1815)
- 1900 – Charles-Louis Hanon, French pianist and composer (born 1819)

=== 1901–present ===
- 1914 – Giuseppe Mercalli, Italian priest, geologist, and volcanologist (born 1850)
- 1919 – Emma Bell Miles, American writer, poet, and artist of Appalachia (born 1879)
- 1930 – Arthur Balfour, Scottish-English politician, Prime Minister of the United Kingdom (born 1848)
- 1930 – Henry Lefroy, Australian politician, 11th Premier of Western Australia (born 1854)
- 1942 – Clinton Hart Merriam, American zoologist, ornithologist, and entomologist (born 1855)
- 1944 – William Hale Thompson, American rancher and politician, 41st Mayor of Chicago (born 1869)
- 1947 – James A. Gilmore, American businessman and baseball executive (born 1887)
- 1948 – Maud Howe Elliott, American novelist (born 1854)
- 1949 – James Somerville, English admiral and politician, Lord Lieutenant of Somerset (born 1882)
- 1949 – James Newland, Australian soldier and policeman (born 1881)
- 1950 – Edgar Rice Burroughs, American soldier and author (born 1875)
- 1950 – Norman Haworth, English chemist and academic, Nobel Prize laureate (born 1883)
- 1951 – Dmytro Doroshenko, Ukrainian historian and politician, Prime Minister of Ukraine (born 1882)
- 1976 – Albert Dieudonné, French actor and author (born 1889)
- 1976 – Paul Kossoff, English guitarist and songwriter (born 1950)
- 1977 – William L. Laurence, Lithuanian-born American journalist and author (born 1888)
- 1978 – M. A. Ayyangar, Indian lawyer and politician, 2nd Speaker of the Lok Sabha (born 1891)
- 1982 – J. B. Kripalani, Indian lawyer and politician (born 1888)
- 1982 – Randy Rhoads, American guitarist, songwriter, and producer (born 1956)
- 1984 – Garry Winogrand, American photographer (born 1928)
- 1986 – Sabino Barinaga, Spanish footballer and manager (born 1922)
- 1987 – Louis de Broglie, French physicist and academic, Nobel Prize laureate (born 1892)
- 1988 – Bun Cook, Canadian ice hockey player and coach (born 1904)
- 1990 – Andrew Wood, American singer-songwriter (born 1966)
- 1993 – Henrik Sandberg, Danish production manager and producer (born 1915)
- 1996 – Lise Østergaard, Danish psychologist and politician (born 1924)
- 1996 – Alan Ridout, English composer and teacher. (born 1934)
- 1996 – Virginia Henderson, American nurse, researcher, theorist and author (born 1897)
- 1997 – Willem de Kooning, Dutch-American painter and educator (born 1904)
- 1997 – Eugène Guillevic, French poet and author (born 1907)
- 1998 – E. M. S. Namboodiripad, Indian theorist and politician, 1st Chief Minister of Kerala (born 1909)
- 1999 – Tofilau Eti Alesana, Samoan politician, 5th Prime Minister of Samoa (born 1924)
- 2000 – Joanne Weaver, American baseball player (born 1935)
- 2000 – Shafiq-ur-Rahman, Pakistani physician and author (born 1920)
- 2003 – Michael Mathias Prechtl, German soldier and illustrator (born 1926)
- 2004 – Mitchell Sharp, Canadian economist and politician, 23rd Canadian Minister of Finance (born 1911)
- 2005 – John DeLorean, American engineer and businessman, founded the DeLorean Motor Company (born 1925)
- 2008 – Arthur C. Clarke, English science fiction writer (born 1917)
- 2008 – Hugo Claus, Belgian author, poet, and playwright (born 1929)
- 2008 – Paul Scofield, English actor (born 1922)
- 2009 – Maria Bergson, Austrian-American architect and interior designer (born 1914)
- 2011 – Kym Bonython, Australian drummer and radio host (born 1920)
- 2012 – Jim Case, American director and producer (born 1927)
- 2012 – Ulu Grosbard, Belgian-American director and producer (born 1929)
- 2012 – Hugo Munthe-Kaas, Norwegian intelligence agent (born 1922)
- 2014 – Patrick Joseph McGovern, American businessman, founded IDG (born 1937)
- 2014 – Fred Phelps, American lawyer, pastor, and activist, founded the Westboro Baptist Church (born 1929)
- 2014 – Heather Robertson, Canadian journalist and author (born 1942)
- 2014 – Robert S. Strauss, American diplomat, United States Ambassador to Russia (born 1918)
- 2014 – Lawrence Walsh, Canadian-American lawyer, judge, and politician, 4th United States Deputy Attorney General (born 1912)
- 2014 – Joseph F. Weis, Jr., American lawyer and judge (born 1923)
- 2015 – Gus Douglass, American farmer and politician (born 1927)
- 2015 – Safet Plakalo, Bosnian author and playwright (born 1950)
- 2015 – Danny Schechter, American director, producer, and screenwriter (born 1942)
- 2016 – Roger Agnelli, Brazilian banker and businessman (born 1959)
- 2016 – Jack Mansell, English footballer and manager (born 1927)
- 2019 – William Whitfield, British architect (born 1920)
- 2021 – Glynn Lunney, American engineer (born 1936)
- 2026 – Chuck Norris, American martial artist and actor (born 1940)

== Holidays and observances ==
- Christian Observances:
  - Alkmund of Derby
  - Blessed Andrea Gallerani
  - Saint Joseph (Western Christianity; if this date falls on Sunday, the feast is moved to Monday March 20)
    - Saint Joseph's Day (Roman Catholicism and Anglican Communion) related observances:
      - Falles, celebrated on the week leading to March 19 (Valencia)
      - Father's Day (Spain, Portugal, Italy, Honduras, and Bolivia)
      - "Return of the Swallow", annual observance of the swallows' return to Mission San Juan Capistrano in California
  - Blessed Marcel Callo
  - Blessed Sibyllina Biscossi
  - March 19 (Eastern Orthodox liturgics)
  - Earliest day on which Maundy Thursday can fall, while April 22 is the latest; celebrated on Thursday before Easter (Christianity)
- Minna Canth's Birthday and the Day of Equality (Finland)
- Kashubian Unity Day (Poland)
