= Giorgio Anselmi =

Giorgio Anselmi may refer to:

- Giorgio Anselmi (astrologer) (died c. 1449), physician, music theorist and astrologer from Parma
- Giorgio Anselmi (poet) (died 1528), Latin poet from Parma
- Giorgio Anselmi (painter) (1723–1797), painter from Verona
- Giorgio Anselmi (senator) (1873–1961), Italian Fascist politician
