= Giorgio Anselmi (astrologer) =

Italian physician and astrologer

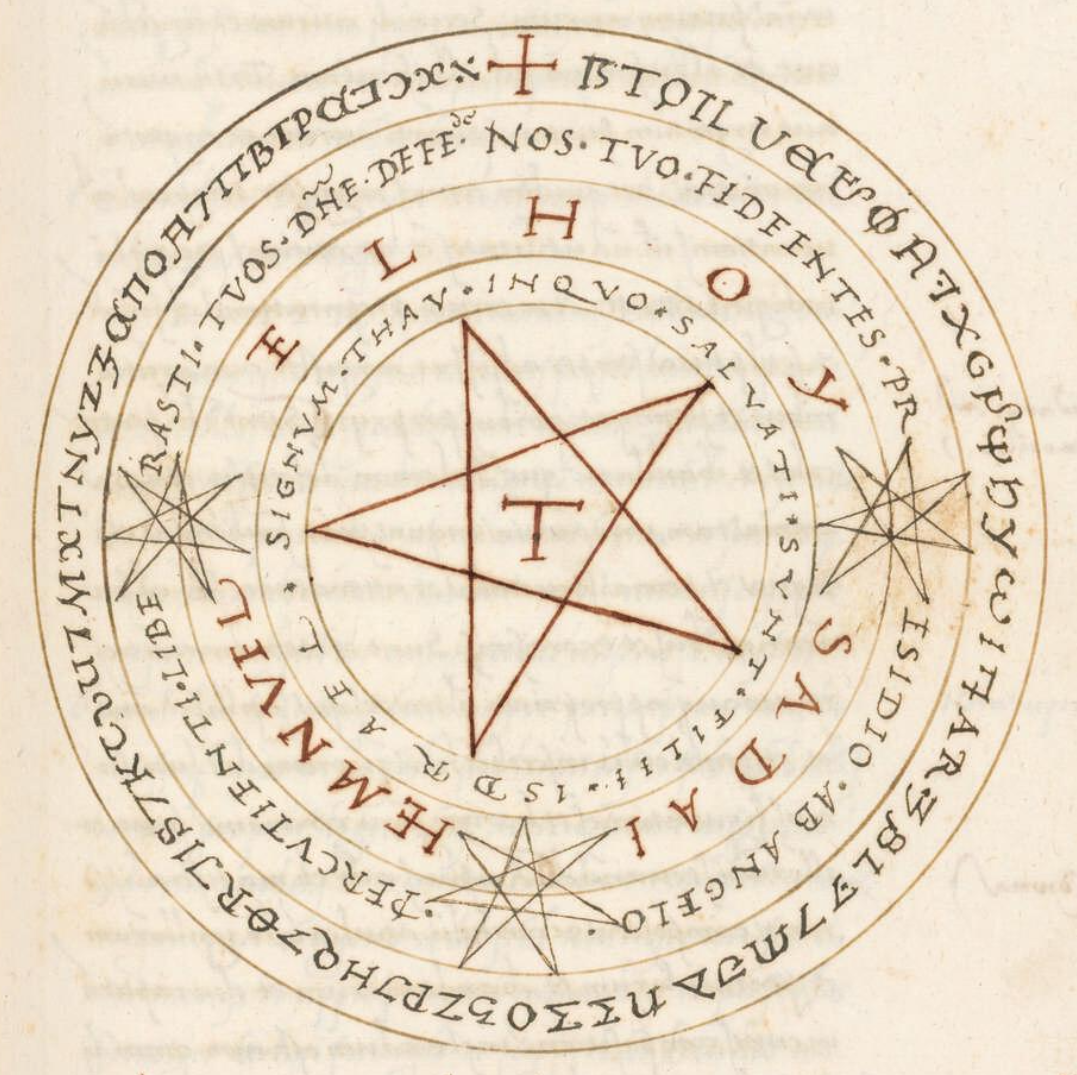
Anselmi's sigillum omnipotentis Dei

Giorgio Anselmi (fl. 1386–1449) was an Italian physician and scholar whose surviving writings concern astrology, magic and music theory.

== Life ==
Anselmi was born in Parma before 1386. His father, Enrico, and grandfather, Bernardo, were both philosophers. Enrico died in the year of his son's birth. Nothing is known of his education. He may have taken lessons from Biagio Pelacani, who was teaching in Parma in those years. When the University of Parma was reopened in 1412, Pelacani and Anselmi were both professors in the faculty of art and medicine.

When the university was suppressed in 1420, Anselmi may have entered the service of Niccolò III d'Este, Marquis of Ferrara. In 1425, he was practising medicine in Modena. In 1428, he received honorary citizenship in Ferrara. In September 1433, he had discussions about music with Pier Maria de' Rossi at Bagni di Lucca. In April 1434, he sent Rossi a written account of these discussions in the form of a dialogue.

Although the University of Parma had ceased to be a teaching institution in 1420, it still existed on paper and had the power to confer degrees. In 1439, Anselmi returned to Parma for a degree conferral. In 1440, as Doctor of Arts and Medicine, he took part in the reform of the statutes of the University of Parma. In 1448–1449, he was teaching medicine at the University of Bologna.

Anselmi died in 1449 or later. He had a daughter, Francesca, and four sons, Ilario, Bartolomeo, Giovanni and Andrea. Andrea's son, also Giorgio Anselmi, wrote epigrams in honour of his grandfather and tried unsuccessfully to published some of the elder Anselmi's unpublished works.

== Works ==
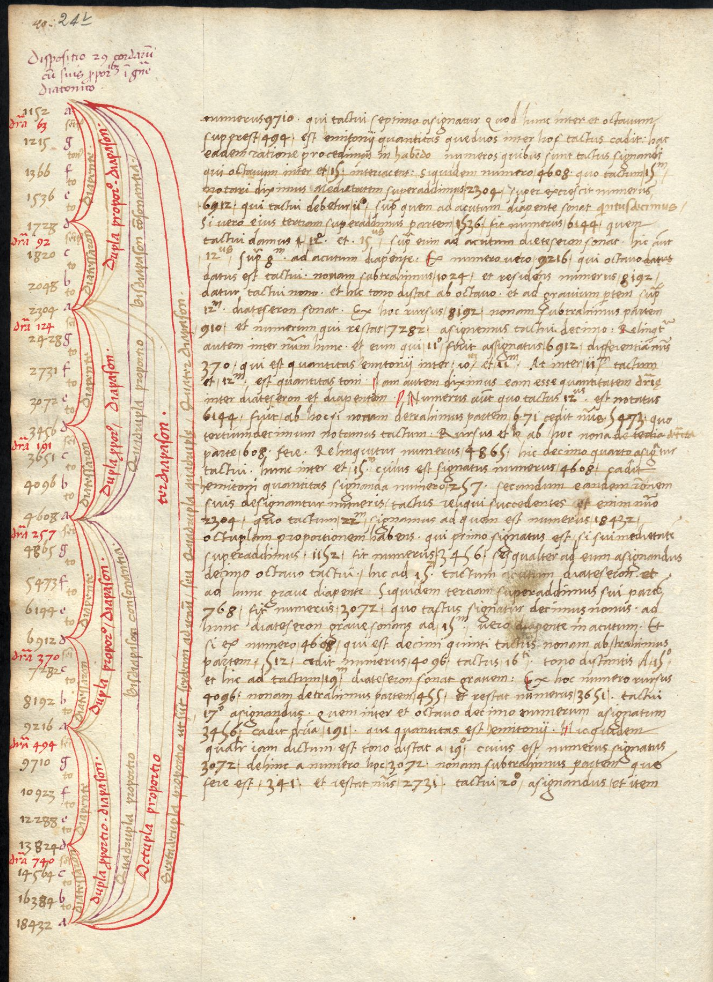
A page from De musica

Anselmi wrote many works on medicine, mathematics, astronomy, astrology and magic. Most of these are lost. Only two survive. The Astronomia, also called Theoremata radicalia, is actually a treatise on astrology. Although a copy once existed in the library of the church of San Tommaso in Pavia, the only copy today is found in a single manuscript (Vat. lat. 4080) of the Vatican Library. The Divinum opus de magia disciplina is one of the earliest commissioned works on magic from Italy. It is divided into five treatises and takes up 230 folios in the single complete copy, now shelfmark Plut. 44.35 in the Biblioteca Medicea Laurenziana in Florence. In addition, the fourth part of the fourth treatise, Quarta pars quarti tractati Georgii Parmensis de modis specialibus Imaginum octavi orbis, is also found in a Vatican manuscript (Vat. lat. 5333).

Anselmi's most famous and influential work is his dialogue on music theory written for Rossi in 1434, De musica. It is preserved in a single manuscript, shelfmark H 233 Inf. in the Biblioteca Ambrosiana in Milan. This copy had been owned by Franchinus Gaffurius, whose made extensive notes in it. De musica is divided into three parts on the music of the spheres (de harmonia coelesti), on musical instruments (de harmonia instrumentali) and on singing (de harmonia cantabili). The philosophical first part is influenced by Boethius' De institutione musica. In the second part Anselmi discusses tonality and various instruments, including the ancient cithara and monochord. In the third part he proposes a new system of mensural notation, which never caught on, although it was reproduced as late as 1613 in Pietro Cerone's Melopeo y maestro. De musica was a major influence on Gaffurius.

== Bibliography ==
- Adkins, Cecil; Blackburn, Bonnie J. (2001). "Anselmi, Giorgio". Grove Music Online (8th ed.). Oxford University Press. ISBN 978-1-56159-263-0. (subscription, Wikilibrary access, or UK public library membership required)
- Azzolini, Monica (2013). The Duke and the Stars: Astrology and Politics in Renaissance Milan. Harvard University Press. doi:10.4159/harvard.9780674067912. ISBN 978-0-674-06663-2.
- Burnett, Charles (1995). "The Scapulimancy of Giorgio Anseimi's Divinum opus de magia disciplina". Euphrosyne. 23: 63–81. doi:10.1484/J.EUPHR.5.125974. S2CID 190265302.
- Cox, Merlin (2016). Similar Stars and Strange Angels: Giorgio Anselmi's Astrological Magic (PDF) (MA thesis). Warburg Institute.
- Grendler, Paul F. (2002). The Universities of the Italian Renaissance. Johns Hopkins University Press.
- Handschin, Jacques (1948). "Anselmi's Treatise on Music Annotated by Gafori". Musica Disciplina. 2 (Fasc. 1/2): 123–140. JSTOR 20531763.
- Moskovitz, Marc D. (2022). Measure: In Pursuit of Musical Time. The Boydell Press.
- Pannella, Liliana (1961). "Anselmi, Giorgio senior". Dizionario Biografico degli Italiani (in Italian). Vol. 3: Ammirato–Arcoleo. Rome: Istituto dell'Enciclopedia Italiana. OCLC 883370.
- Slemon, Peter (2010). "Georgius Anselmi". In Robert E. Bjork (ed.). The Oxford Dictionary of the Middle Ages. Oxford University Press. ISBN 978-0-19-866262-4.
- Thorndike, Lynn (1934). A History of Magic and Experimental Science During the First Thirteen Centuries of Our Era. Vol. 4. Columbia University Press.
- Zambelli, Paolo (2007). White Magic, Black Magic in the European Renaissance. Brill.
