= Giorgio Anselmi (poet) =

Italian humanist, classicist and poet (c. 1450–1528)

Possible portrait sketch of Giorgio Anselmi by Parmigianino

Giorgio Anselmi (c. 1450 – 1528) was an Italian humanist, classicist and poet.

== Life ==
Anselmi was born in Parma before 1459. His father was Andrea Anselmi. He often added the Latin epithet nepos (grandson) to his name, to distinguish himself from his grandfather, the physician and astrologer Giorgio Anselmi. He was educated in the Latin and Greek classics, philosophy and medicine. He was also a numismatist.

Anselmi was friends with Francesco Mario Grapaldo, Taddeo Ugoleto and Francesco Carpesano. He is known to have given a coin of Petillius Capitolinus to Ugoleto out of his large collection. He was active in Parmesan politics and was fled the city with his family when King Charles VIII of France approached it with his army during the invasion of 1494. He returned following the war, but spent most of his later years on his farms outside Parma and near Brescello.

Anselmi had an interest in magic and the occult. He may be the Giorgio who lent his copy of Picatrix to Marsilio Ficino. In the 1510s, he worked unsuccessfully to have his grandgather's occult works published. He was by then an esteemed man of letters. There is an acrostic for Anselmi in Teofilo Folengo's Chaos del tri per uno. In 1523, he was praised by the Venetian envoy to Parma, Andrea Navagero.

Anselmi had two daughters, Ottavia and Virginia, one of whom entered the convent of San Paolo in Parma in 1518. In decorating the Camera della Badessa around that time, the abbess Gioanna da Piacenza and the painter Correggio may have consulted with Anselmi on classical themes. Anselmi died in Parma in 1528 during an outbreak of plague.

== Works ==
Anselmi's Latin poetry is humanistic and highly classicizing. Although strong technically, it was criticized as dry even by contemporaries like Lelio Gregorio Giraldi.

Several of Anselmi's works were printed at Parma, Hecuba in 1506 and Epiphyllides in Plautum in 1510. His greatest work, a collection of poems in seven books, Epigrammaton libri septem, was first printed at Parma in 1526. The third edition, printed by Maffeo Pasini at Venice in 1528, includes three other poetic compositions:Sosthyrides, Peplum Palladis and Aeglogae quattuor. Anselmi dedicated epigrams to Navagero, Carpesano, Giovanni Pontano, Pietro Bembo, the physician Giovanni Marco Garbazzo and his friend and fellow coin collector, Bernardo Bregonzi. He wrote an epitaph for his grandfather and several epigrams are dedicated to the latter's lost works on astrology and magic, plus one on his surviving work De musica. Three epigrams are dedicated to Homer. The thoroughly secular and even polytheistic work ends with thanks offered to the Virgin Mary. An example of Anselmi's "only half-playful polytheism" can be found in his "Jovi et diis omnibus":

Maxime optime Juppiterque, vosque
Omnes Dii Deaeque, quis agello
Sedem ex paupere dico dedicoque
Et solemnia rite sacra et aras
Hac re, legeque, dico dedicoque.
Jupiter Optimus Maximus, and you, all the gods and goddesses to whom I vow and dedicate a shrine from [the proceeds] of my modest little country place, to you I also duly vow and dedicate, by this deed and undertaking, solemn sacrifices and altars.

Anselmi's biography of Jacopo Caviceo, Vita de Giacopo Caviceo, was printed at Venice in 1538. A number of his poems are included in the collection Delitiae CC Italorum Poetarum by Jan Gruter (1708).

== Bibliography ==
- Franzoni, Claudio (2020). "Correggio, the Humanists and the Homeric nepenthes". Journal of the Warburg and Courtauld Institutes. 83 (1): 337–347.
- Panofsky, Erwin (1961). The Iconography of Correggio's Camera Di San Paolo. The Warburg Institute.
- Periti, Giancarla (2014–2015). "Regarding Parmigiano's Early Portraits". Memoirs of the American Academy in Rome. 59–60: 284–309. JSTOR 44981979.
- Quattrucci, Mario (1961). "Anselmi, Giorgio". Dizionario Biografico degli Italiani (in Italian). Vol. 3: Ammirato–Arcoleo. Rome: Istituto dell'Enciclopedia Italiana. OCLC 883370.
- Zambelli, Paolo (2007). White Magic, Black Magic in the European Renaissance. Brill.
