= Church Santa Maria Gualtieri =

Church in Pavia, Italy

Santa Maria Gualtieri
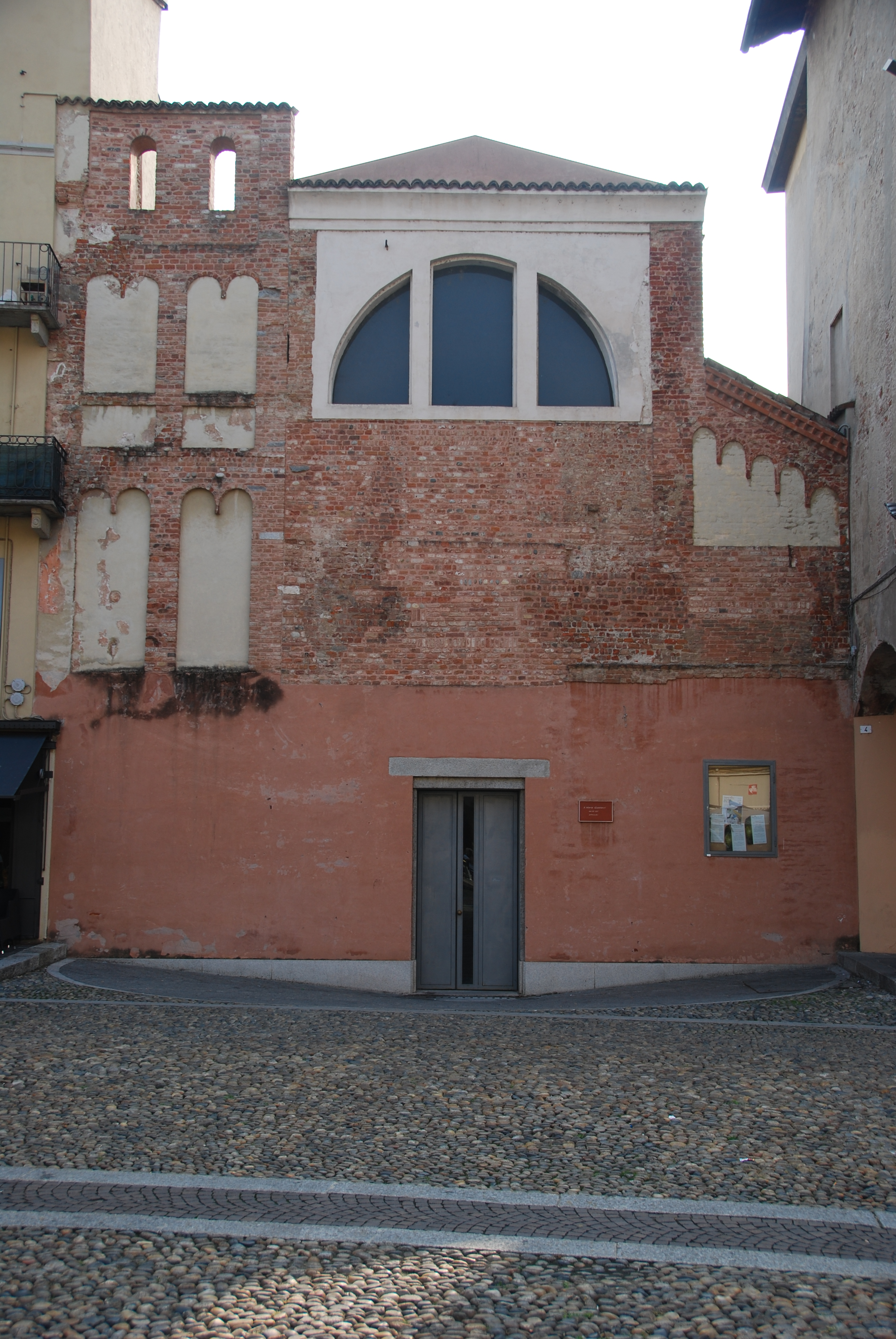

Religion
- Affiliation: Catholic
- Province: Pavia
- Year consecrated: 989
- Status: Active

Location
- Location: Pavia, Italy
- Interactive map of Santa Maria Gualtieri
- Coordinates: 45°11′9.672″N 9°9′18.108″E

Architecture
- Type: Church
- Style: Romanesque
- Completed: 11th century

The church Santa Maria Gualtieri is a deconsecrated church in Pavia now used for exhibitions, concerts and conferences.

== History ==
The church was founded in 989 by Walterius (in Italian Gualtiero), son of Wualpertus, judge of the Royal Palace of Pavia, missus dominicus and brother of the Countess Rotruda, who had the church built near his own home, dedicating it to Santa Maria. Walterius himself endowed the church with rich possessions, including the hospital of San Giacomo della Cerreta in Belgioioso. The church, which overlooks Piazza Vittoria, the ancient Roman forum of the city, was rebuilt in the second half of the 11th century and was consecrated by Pope Urban II in 1096, when the pontiff visited Pavia. In 1182 the church was governed by a canonical college formed by a provost and seven canons. In 1250 the church was included among the parishes of Porta Laudensis, while the apostolic visitation of 1576 informs us that at that date the clergy consisted of eight priests and the parish was populated by 300 communion souls, which rose, in 1769, to seven priests and seven clerics. Even at the end of the eighteenth century, the rectory still possessed discrete land properties, concentrated above all in the Pavia area, equivalent to 76.5 hectares. The population of the parish rose in 1780 to 993 communion souls.

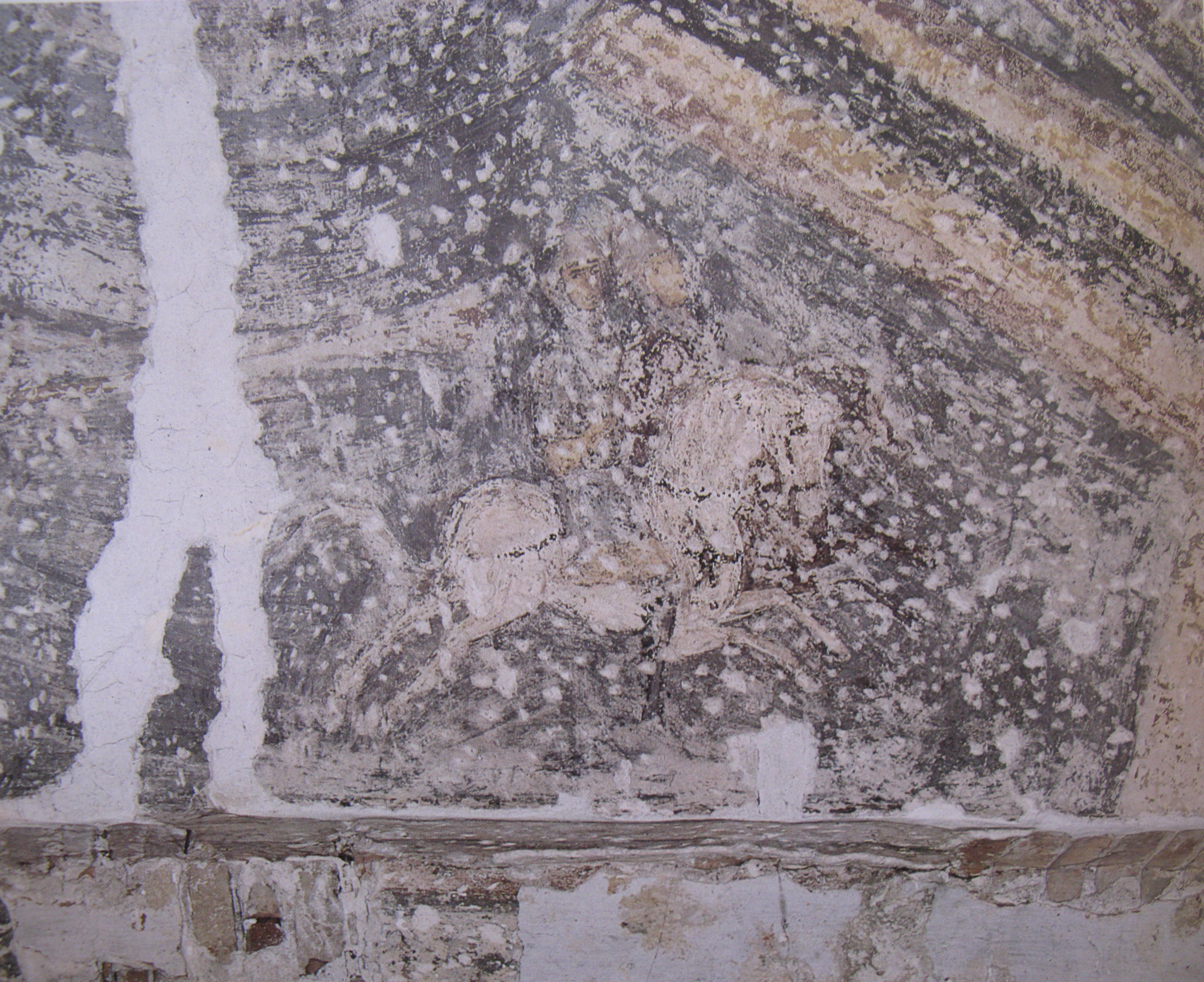
The Horsemen of the Apocalypse, 11th century.

In 1788, on the basis of the reorganization plan of the urban parishes desired by Emperor Joseph II, the church was suppressed and united with the parish of Saints Gervasio and Protasio. The building was definitively deconsecrated in 1798 and sold to private individuals, who transformed it into homes and shops. The church was purchased by the municipality of Pavia in the 1960s and was the subject of archaeological investigations in 1975. After a long restoration, in 1991, the church was reopened.

== Architecture ==
As evidenced by the archaeological excavations, the first church, dating back to the second half of the 10th century, had a single hall with three apses. The current building was built in the second half of the 11th century. It has three naves, with rib vaults, for four bays. Much of the building is made by reusing large bricks from the Roman age and river pebbles. The pillars have brick capitals typical of 11th-century Lombard architecture. Illumination is guaranteed by some single lancet windows and internally there are traces of frescoes (the knights of the Apocalypse, the figure of an angel) also dating back to the late 11th century.

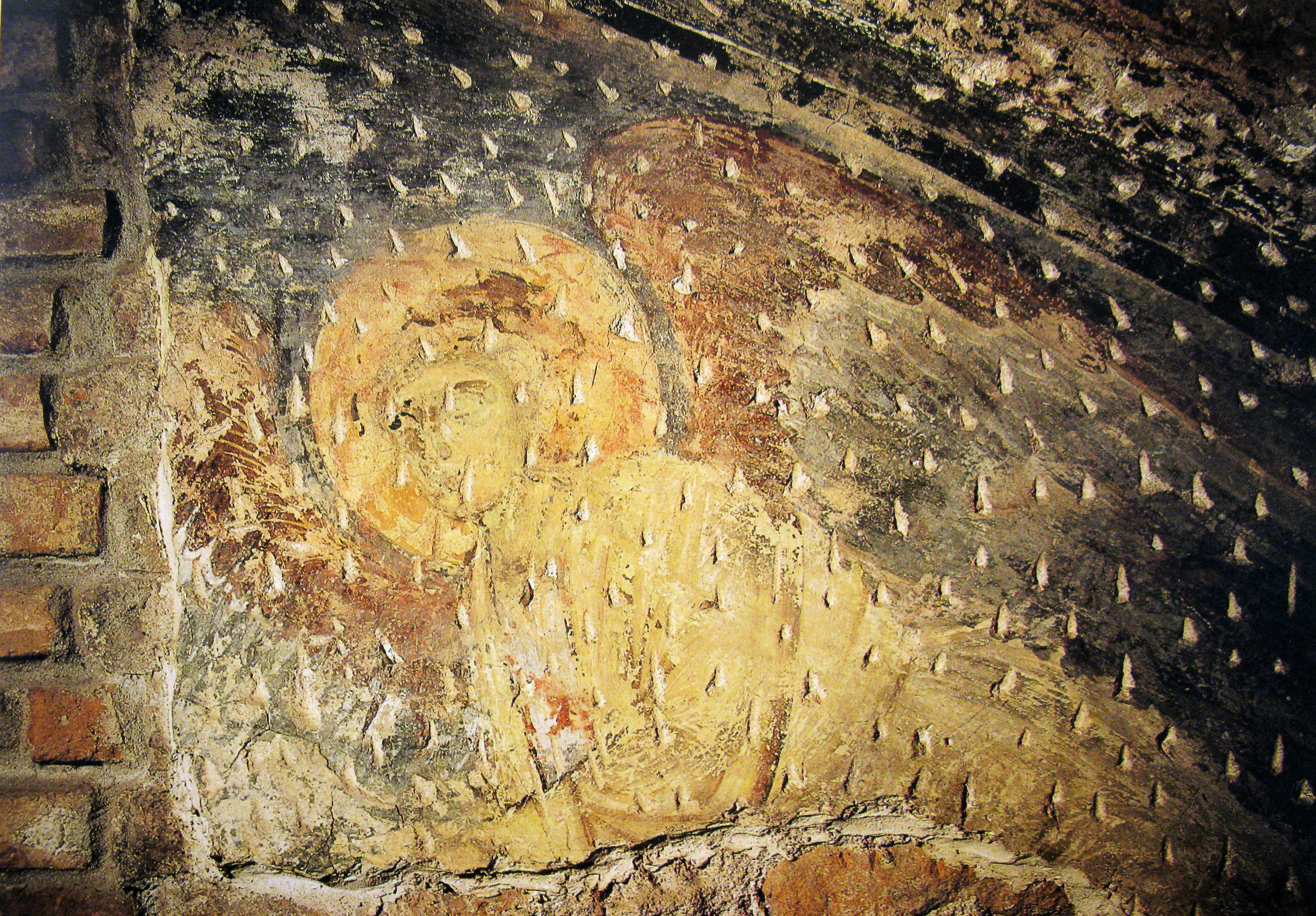
Fresco with angelic figure, 11th century.

The church underwent radical structural changes in the 16th century: two of the original apses were demolished (only the southern one remains intact) and the central one was replaced by a rectangular choir. In the late seventeenth century the church underwent renovations to adapt it to the new Baroque taste, a large window was opened on the facade, the interiors were enriched with stuccos and the medieval cloister of the church was demolished. The facade is divided into three fields by buttresses and ends with small arches. Of the original late 10th-century building, part of the masonry of the bell tower is preserved, decorated with small arches and clearly visible on the side of the facade.

== Bibliography ==
- Giovanna Forzatti Golia, Istituzioni ecclesiastiche pavesi dall'età longobarda alla dominazione visconteo- sforzesca, Roma, Herder, 2002.
- Archeologia urbana a Pavia, I, a cura di Hugo Blake, Pavia, Emi, 1995.
- La chiesa di santa Maria Gualtieri in Pavia: indagini, analisi, progetti e metodoligia di restauro, a cura di Alice Astori, Como, New Press, 1991.
