= Sibyllina Biscossi =

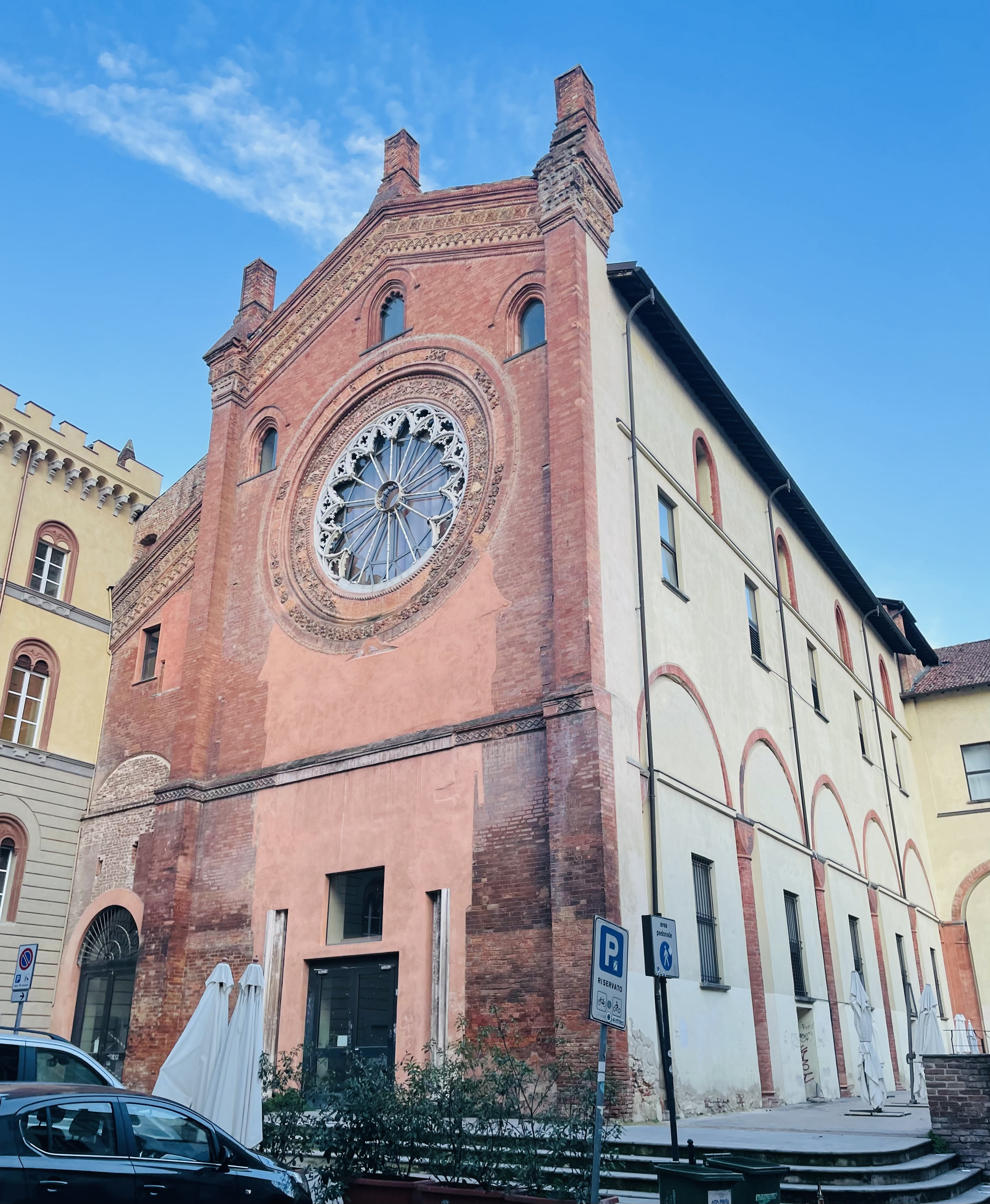
Sybillina Biscossi lived for the majority of her life as a recluse in a cell next to the Dominican Church of Pavia

Sibyllina Biscossi OP (1287 – 19 March 1367) was an Italian Dominican nun, recluse and mystic.

== Biography ==
Sibyllina Biscossi was born to a distinguished and religious family of Pavia in 1287. She became an orphan at a very young age and therefore had to earn a living for herself as a servant. When she was twelve, she completely lost her eye-sight and was taken in by some nuns of the Dominican Order. With fifteen years she became a member of the Third Order of Saint Dominic and confined herself to a small cell next to the church of the Dominicans in Pavia. There, she lived a life of asceticism and contemplation and was visited by many who asked for her advice and comfort. She died on March 19 1367 surrounded by the religious of her order after having received the Final Sacrament.

== Veneration ==
Soon after her death her hagiography was written by the Dominican Thomaso of Bozzolasto but she continued to be venerated mostly within Pavia. She was finally officially beatified by Pope Pius IX in 1854. Her feast day according to the Roman Martyrology is March 19, but the diocese of Pavia celebrates it on March 23 and the Dominican Order on April 18.

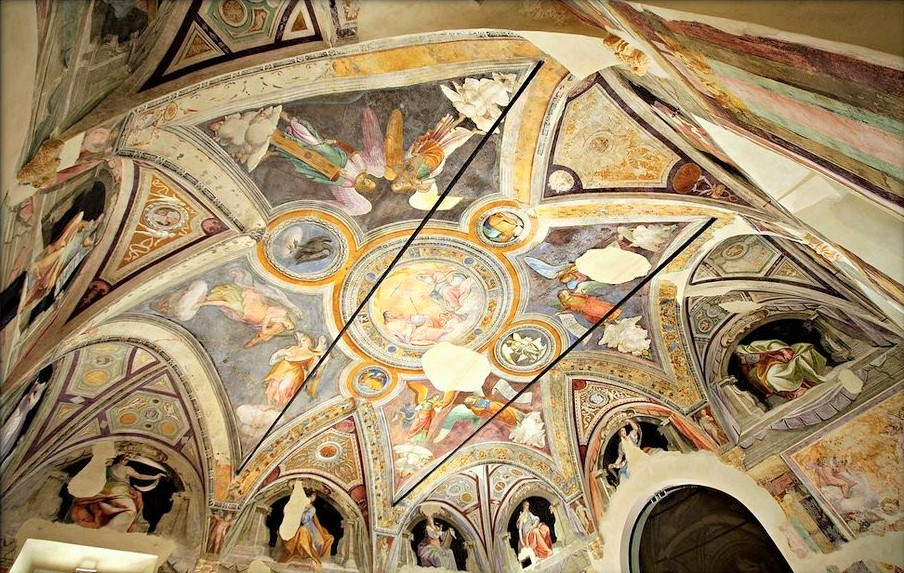
Botigella chapel where Biscossi's remains were first interred

Her remains were originally buried in the Church of San Tommaso where Giovanni Matteo Bottigella, an important Pavian citizen and distant relative, established a chapel to honor her relics. After the Dominican convent was dissolved the relics were transferred to the cathedral of Pavia.
