= Water dragon =

Water dragon may refer to:

- Sea serpent, a type of sea monster that is sometimes known as the Water Dragon
- Australian water dragon, Intellagama lesueurii, a lizard native to eastern Australia
- Chinese water dragon, Physignathus cocincinus, a lizard native to mainland Asia
- Saururus cernuus, plant species also known as water-dragon
- Water Dragon (Chinese Zodiac) in the Chinese Sexagenary cycle
- Water dragon, a fictional race in the Freedom Planet video game series
