= Church of San Tommaso, Pavia =

Church in Pavia, Lombardy, Italy

Church of San Tommaso
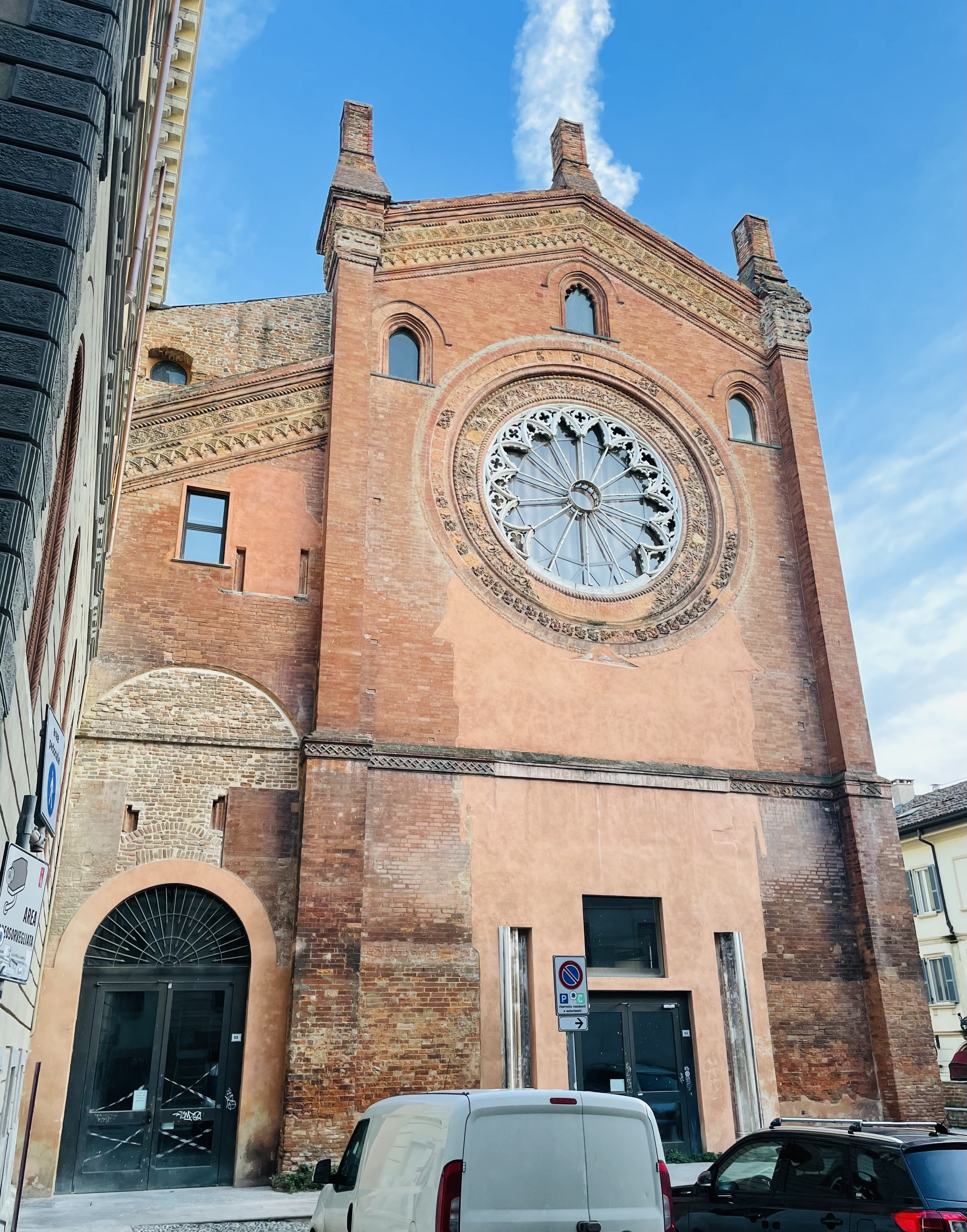
- Façade of church

Religion
- Province: Pavia
- Year consecrated: 1320
- Status: Active

Location
- Location: Pavia, Italy
- Interactive map of Church of San Tommaso
- Coordinates: 45.1841°N 9.1565°E

Architecture
- Type: Church
- Style: Gothic
- Completed: 1478

The Church of San Tommaso is a former Catholic church and monastery in the city of Pavia, Lombardy, Italy. It is located within the historic city center and belongs to the University of Pavia.

== History ==
The female Benedictine monastery of San Tommaso is first mentioned in an imperial diploma by Arnulf of Carinthia from 889. It was built on the remains of a large building with apses, perhaps thermal in purpose, which date from Roman times. The church was rebuilt in 1213, and in 1302 it became the seat of the Dominican friars.

In 1320, work began on the construction of a new, larger church. However, due to numerous interruptions, the construction was only completed in 1478. Many private individuals contributed to the construction of the new church through bequests, including Ardengo Folperti—the Master of the Ducal Entrances of the Duchy of Milan—who paid for the work of the apse, as evidenced by the stone coats of arms inserted outside the structure.

From the 14th century, the monastery became the seat of the Inquisition in Pavia. The monastery owned large agricultural estates in Roncaro and Samperone, located mainly within the territory of Pavia.

In 1782, the monastery was suppressed by Joseph II and transformed into the General Seminary for the Austrian Lombardy. Giuseppe Piermarini, charged with adapting the complex to the new destination, heavily modified the church and demolished the entire right aisle, while saving the 15th-century cloister. A few years later, in 1791, the seminary was closed, and the complex became a barracks; it remained so until the 1980s, when it was sold to the University of Pavia. After restorations, the university now uses the church as the seat of some university faculties and the Humanistic Studies library.

== Architecture ==
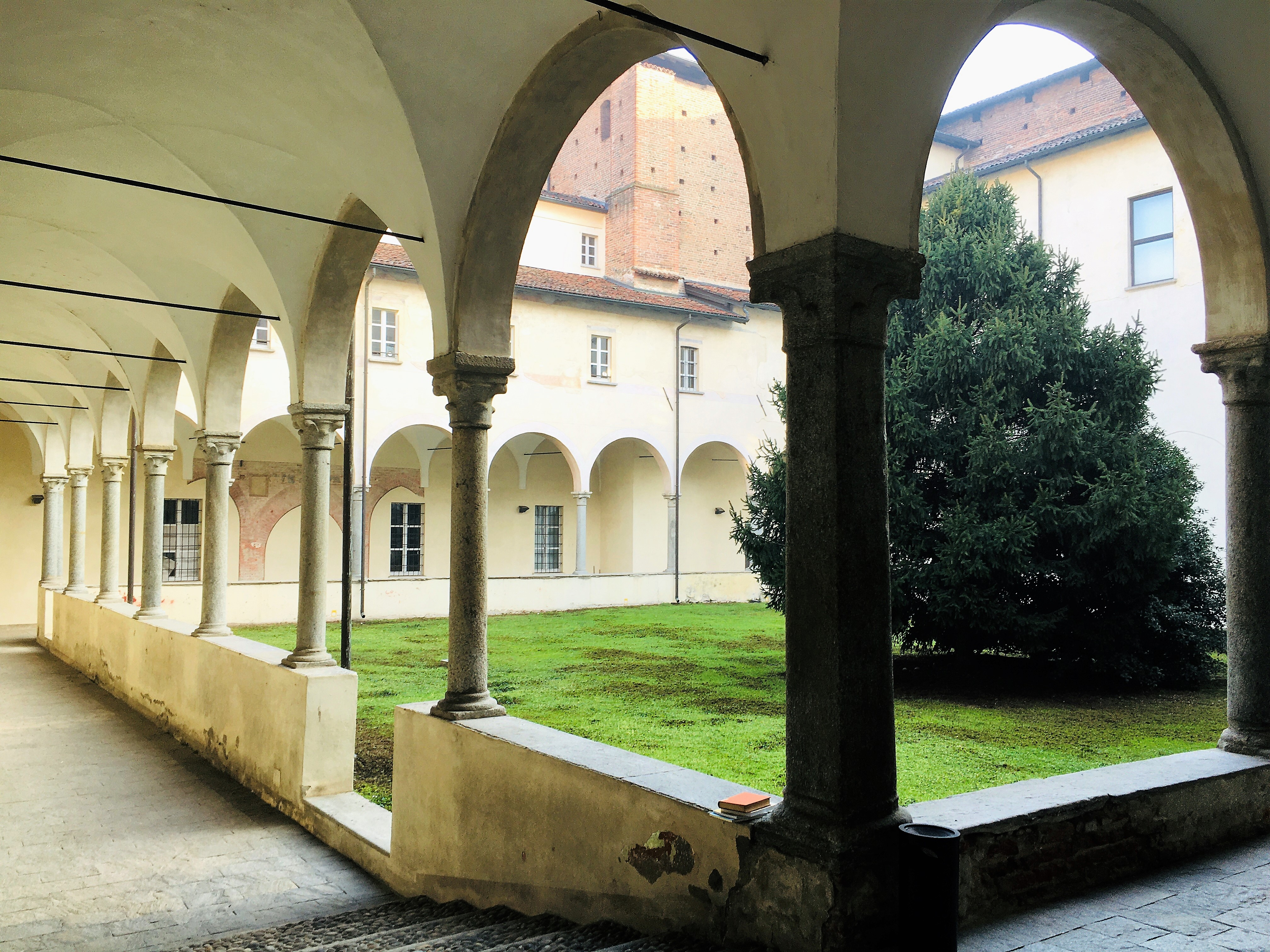
The cloister

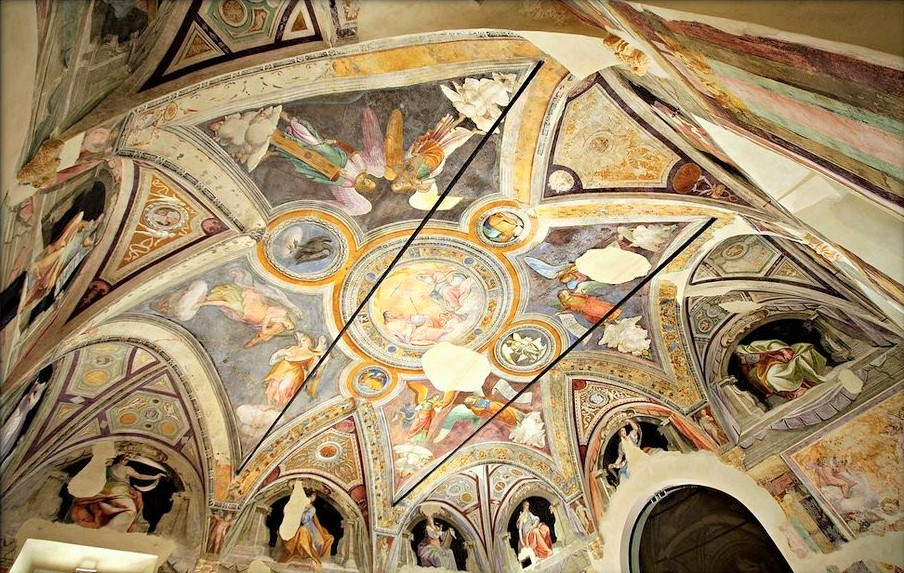
Bottigella Chapel

The church's façade has a broken pediment, with a central elevation and a large gothic rose window of white marble in the center. This façade recalls that of the nearby church of Santa Maria del Carmine; similarities include the decorative terracotta crowning band and the rose window. The church has a Greek cross plan and was divided into three naves, of which only two remain; the southern nave was demolished by Giuseppe Piermarini between 1782 and 1789.

On the left aisle there were five chapels, one of which was granted to the University of Pavia by the Dominican fathers in 1392. Another chapel, built in the second half of the 15th century by Giovanni Matteo Bottigella, remains almost completely intact. This chapel was used as a burial place for the members of the Bottigella family, and contained the relics of Sibyllina Biscossi. It originally housed the large Pala Bottigella by Vincenzo Foppa, which was initially frescoed by Bernardino Lanzani. Between the end of the 16th century and the beginning of the 17th century, it was re-frescoed by the Sienese painter Alessandro Casolari and the Roman Angelo Righi, who completed the cycle of the Sibyls in 1605.

Similar to the church of San Francesco in Pavia, the Church of San Tommaso has cross-vaults in the presbytery and in the side aisles, while part of the central aisle was equipped with a wooden trussed ceiling. The naves are divided by mighty cylindrical brick pillars, with notched cube capitals. According to Piermarini's project, the church's height was divided into two floors; this partition was maintained during restorations in the 1990s.
