= Iglesia de Santa María =

Iglesia de Santa María may refer to:

- Iglesia de Santa María (Arbazal), a church in Asturias, Spain
- Iglesia de Santa María (Arzabal), a church in Asturias, Spain
- Iglesia de Santa María (Bendones), a church in Asturias, Spain
- Iglesia de Santa María (Cerredo), a church in Asturias, Spain
- Iglesia de Santa María (Limanes), a church in Asturias, Spain
- Iglesia de Santa María (Llanes), a church in Llanes, Asturias, Spain
- Iglesia de Santa María (Luanco), a church in Asturias, Spain
- Iglesia de Santa María (Lugás), a church in Asturias, Spain
- Iglesia de Santa María (Mián), a church in Asturias, Spain
- Iglesia de Santa María (Monasterio de Hermo), a church in Asturias, Spain
- Iglesia de Santa María (Noreña), a church in Asturias, Spain
- Iglesia de Santa María (Oviedo), a defunct church in Oviedo, Asturias, Spain
- Iglesia de Santa María (Piedeloro), a church in Asturias, Spain
- Iglesia de Santa María (San Antolín de Ibias), a church in Asturias, Spain
- Iglesia de Santa María (Sebrayo), a church in Asturias, Spain
- Iglesia de Santa María (Soto de Luiña), a church in Asturias, Spain
- Iglesia de Santa María (Tanes), a church in Asturias, Spain
- Iglesia de Santa María (Valdediós), a church in Asturias, Spain
- Iglesia de Santa María (Villamayor), a church in Asturias, Spain
- Iglesia de Santa María del Temple (Ceinos de Campos)
