= Luanco =

- Parish
- Location within Spain
- Coordinates: 43.6175°N 5.793889°W
- Country: Spain
- Autonomous community: Asturias
- Province: Asturias
- Municipality: Gozón

Luanco (Asturian: Lluanco) is the capital town (and parish) of the municipality of Gozón, within the province of Asturias, in northern Spain.

The population is 5,693 (INE 2007).

Luanco was an important fishing and whaling port. Currently, Luanco is a relevant tourist point in northern Spain, well known for its historic buildings (Santa María church, the Torre del Reloj, or the Palace of Menéndez Pola), the beaches of Santa María and La Ribera and its gastronomy. The town also hosts the Torneo Tenis Playa, the only organized tennis tournament played on sand courts.

Luanco houses the Maritime Museum of Asturias (Museo Marítimo de Asturias) since 1948.

== Villages and hamlets ==
- Aramar
- Balbín
- Legua
- Luanco (capital town)
- Mazorra
- Moniello
- Peroño
- Santa Ana
- Santa Eualia de Nembro

== Gallery ==
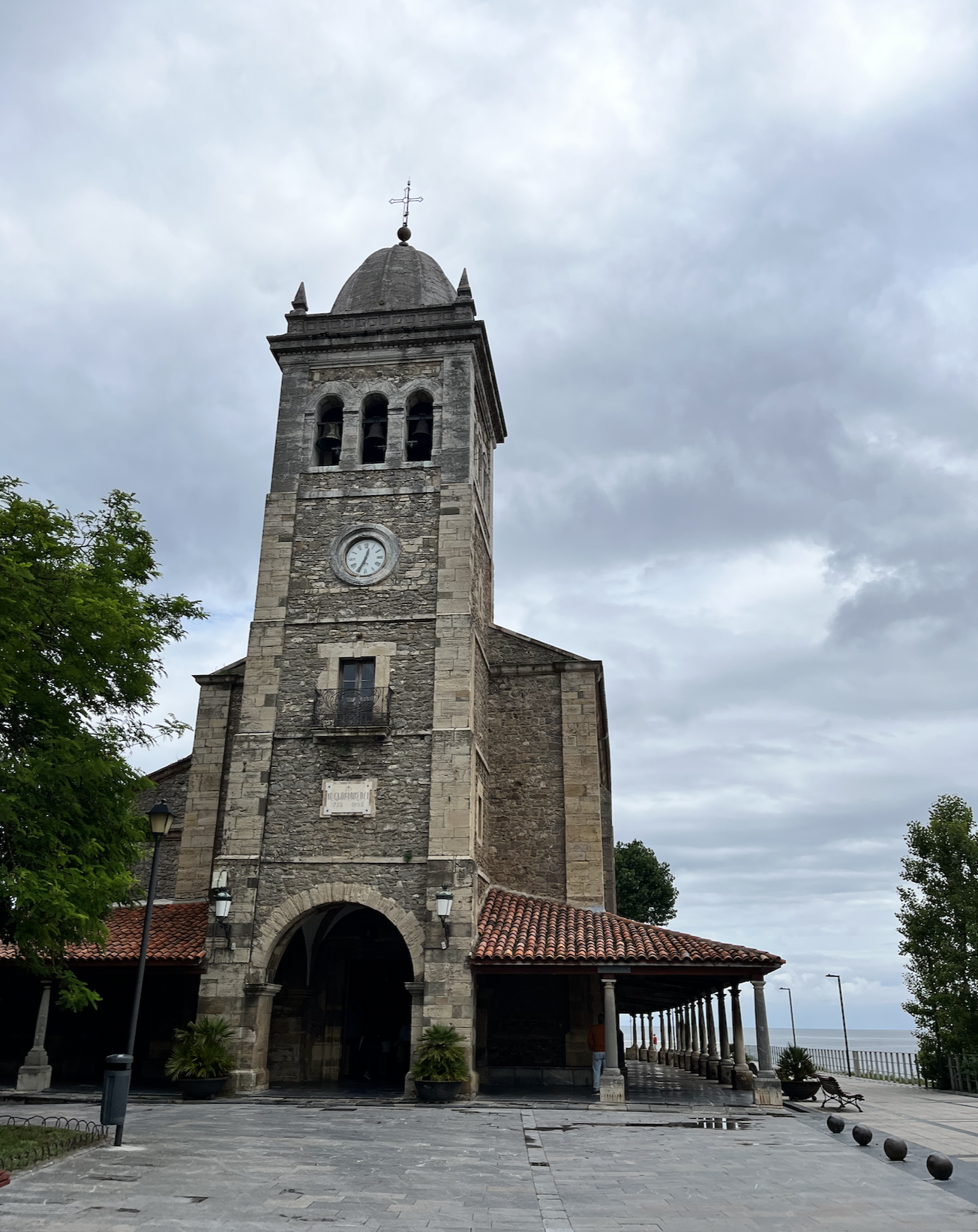
Santa María church

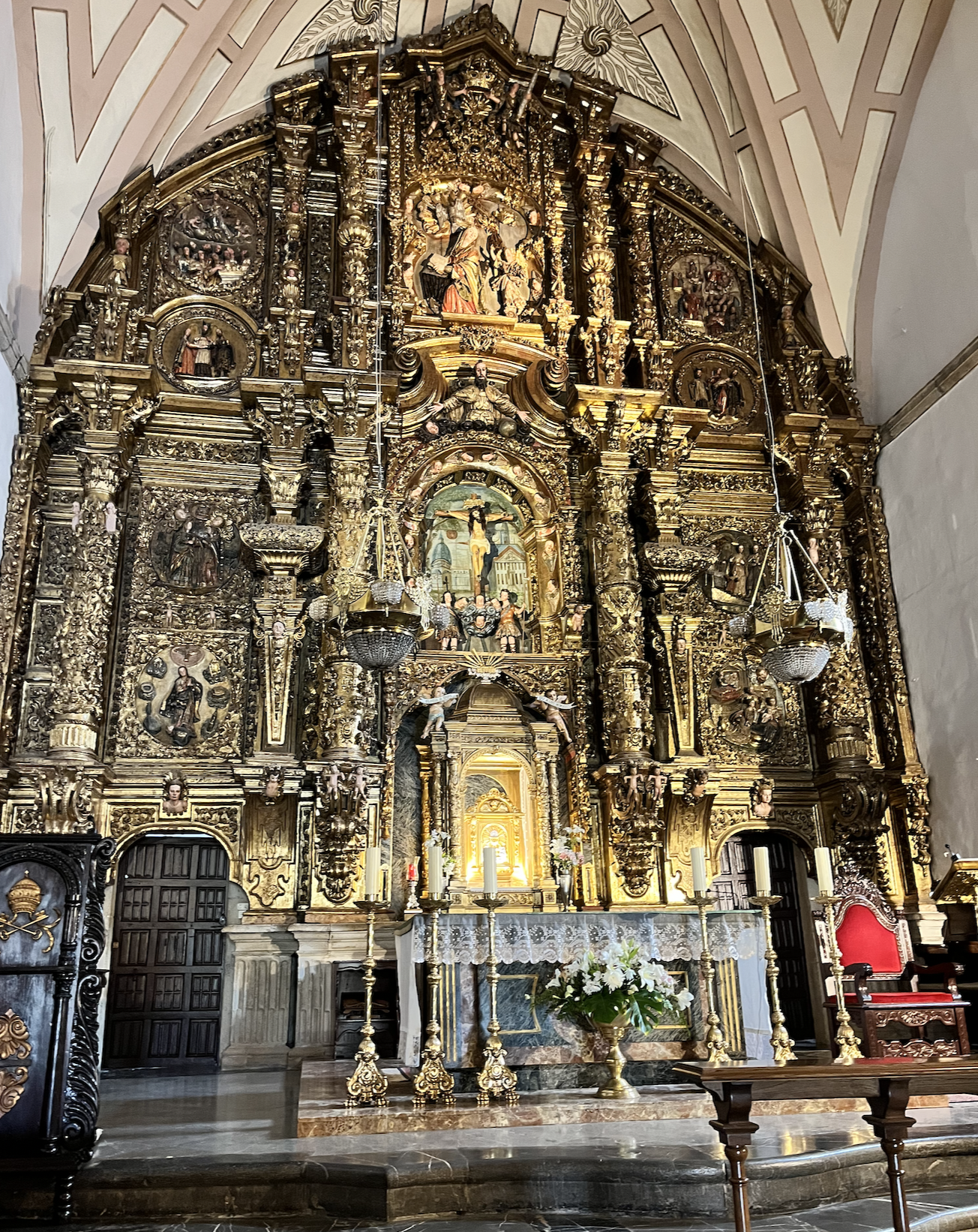
Interior altar of the Santa María church in Lluanco

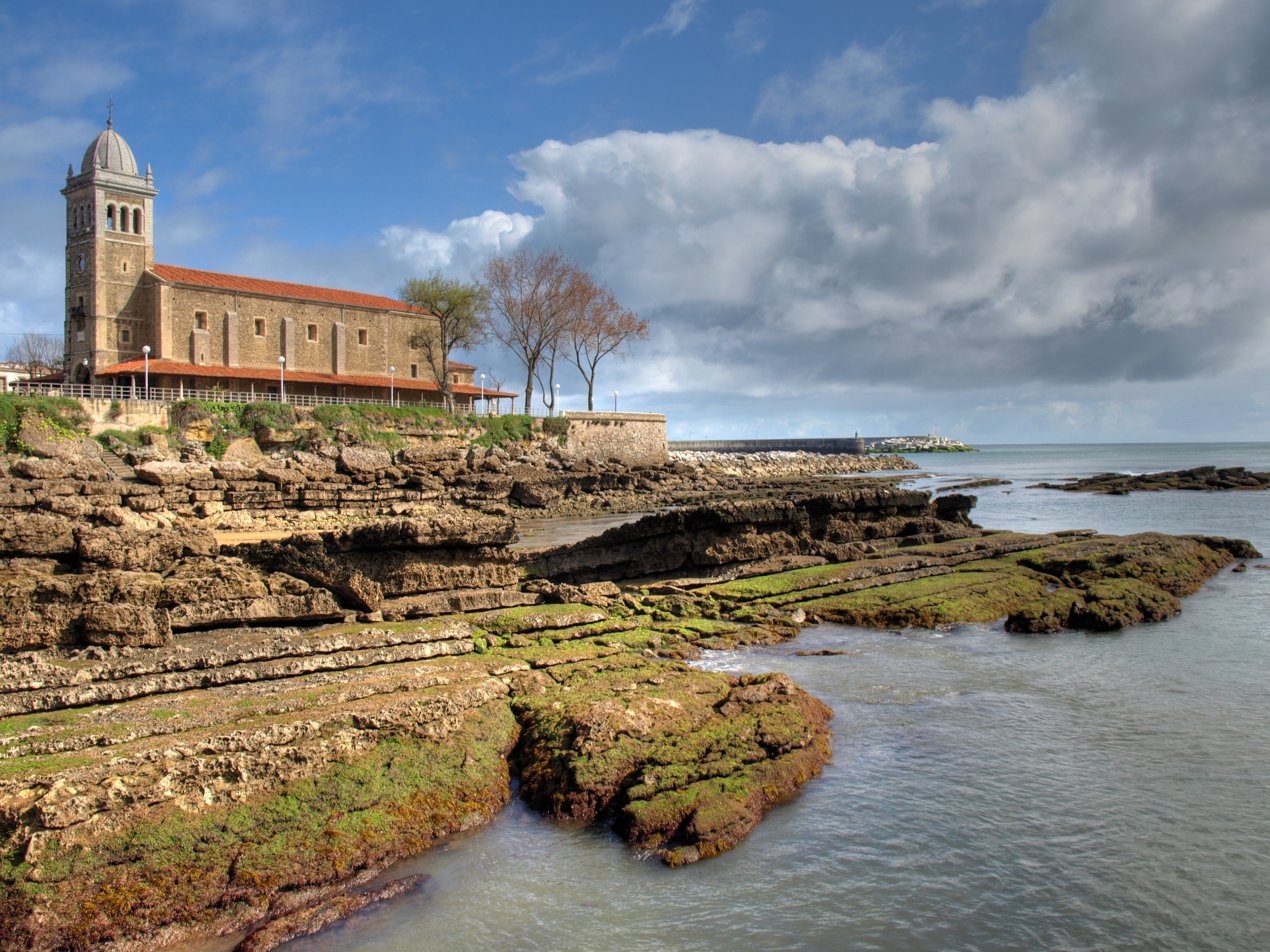
Santa María church

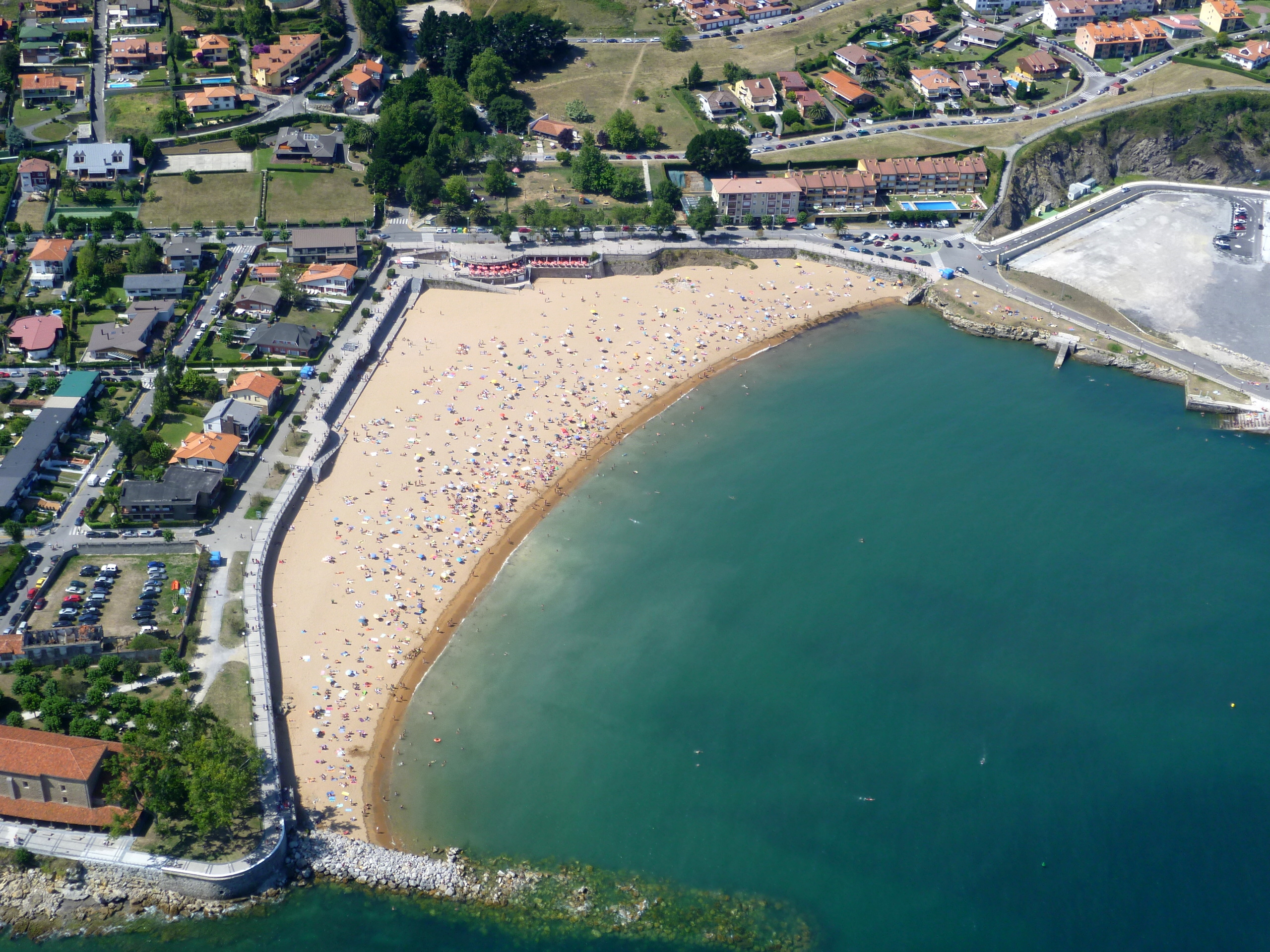
Santa María beach

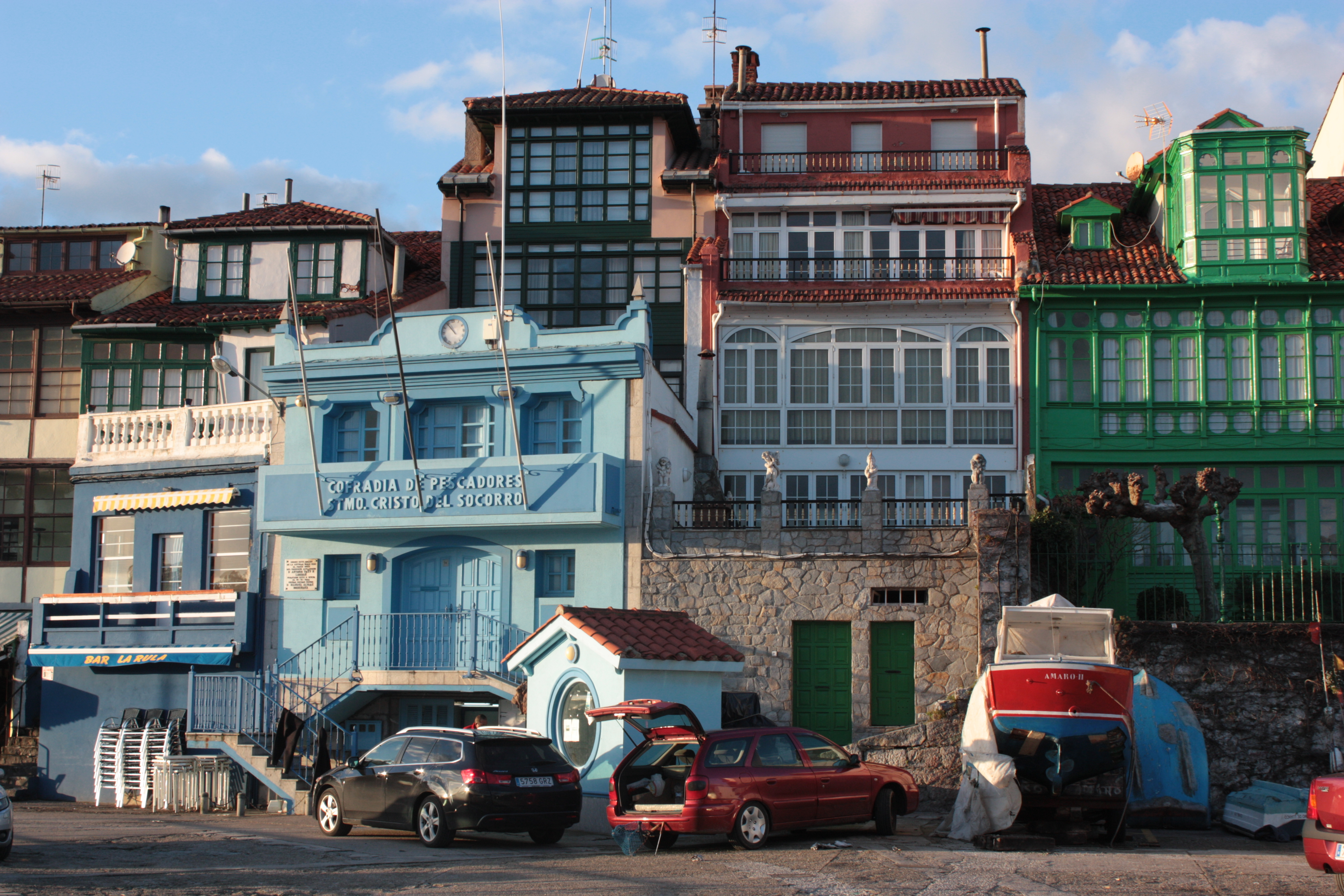
Typical buildings

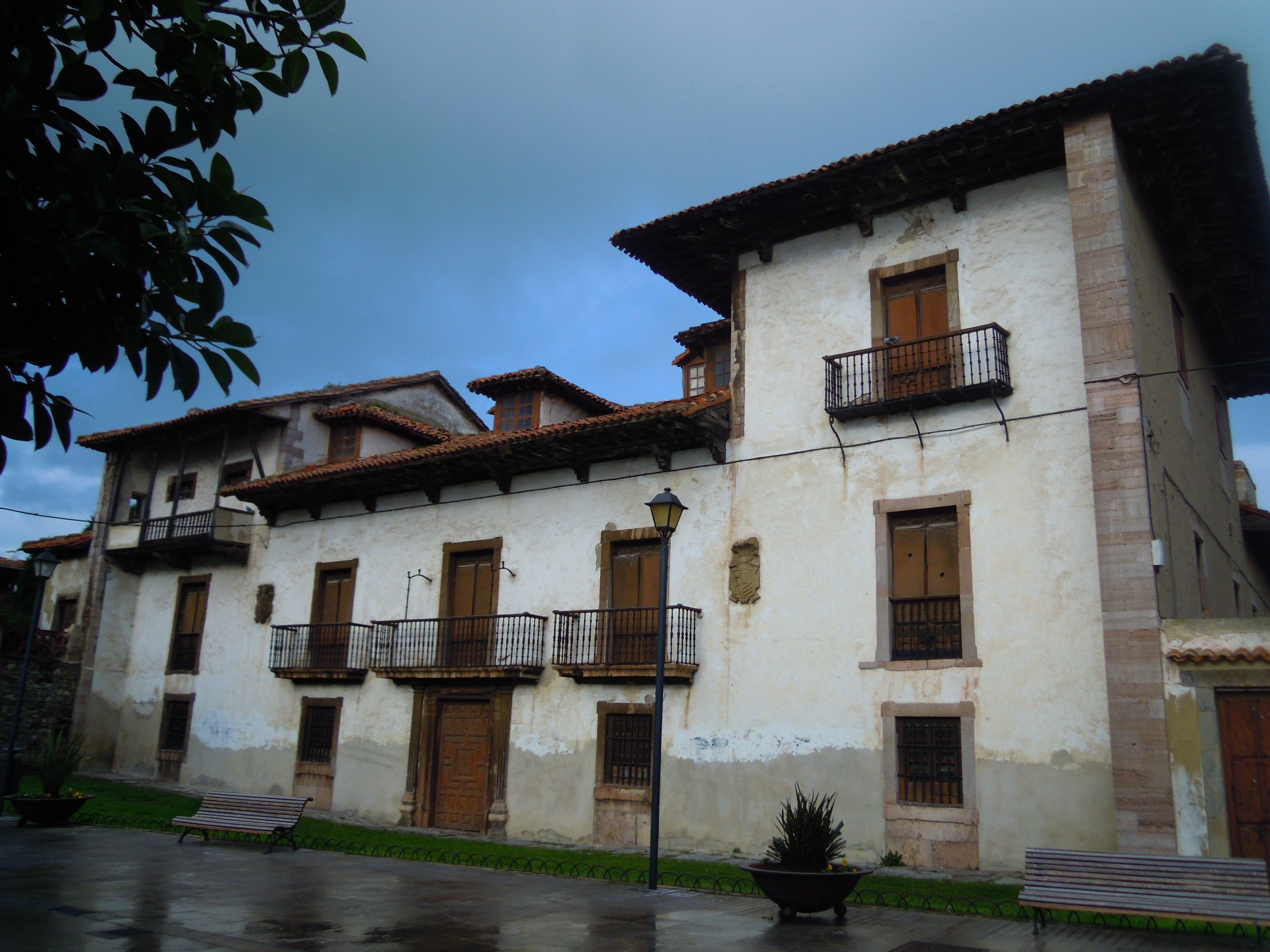
Menéndez Pola Palace

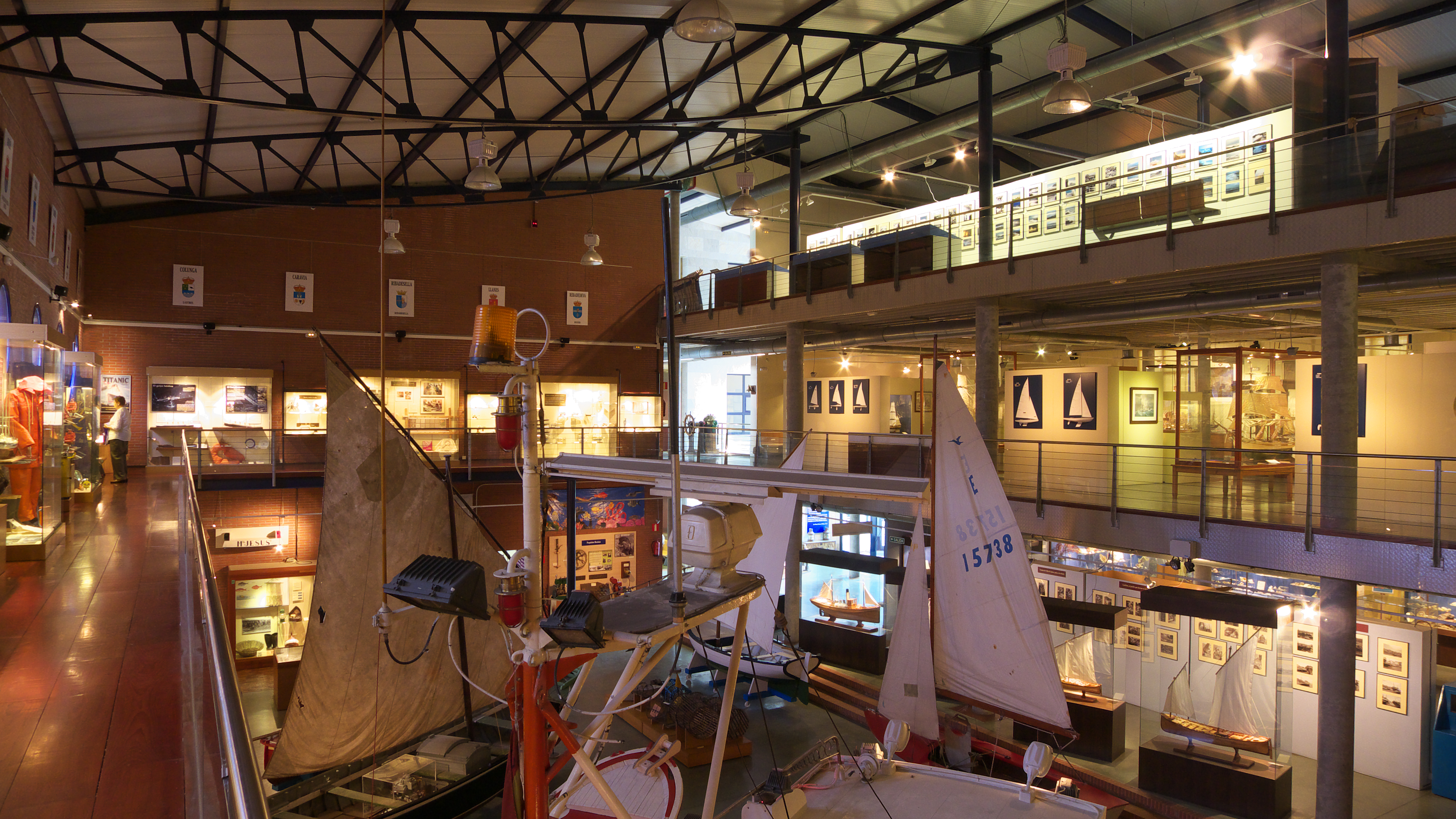
Maritime Museum

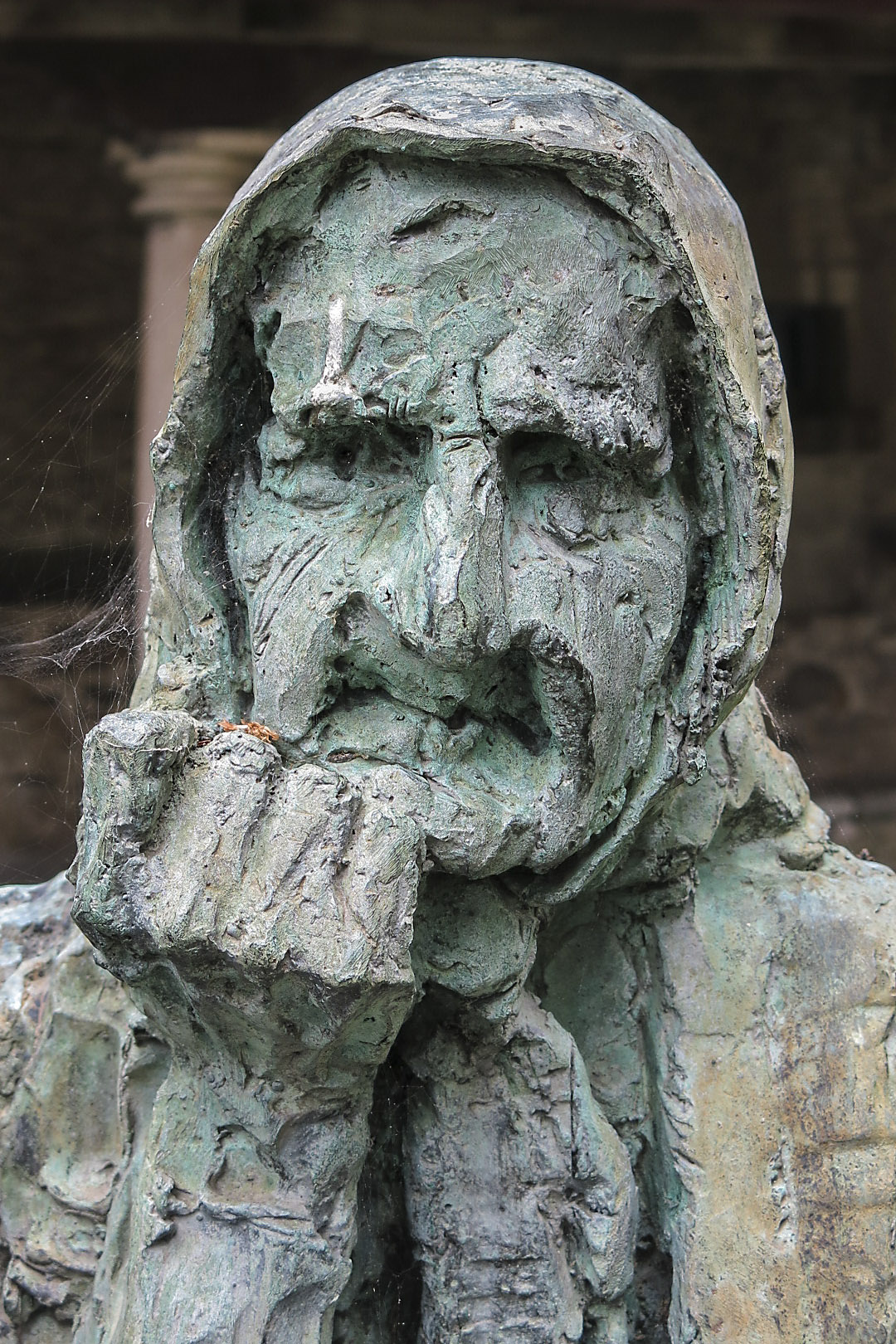
Plañideras, Pepe Antonio Márquez
