= Ceinos de Campos =

- Flag Coat of arms

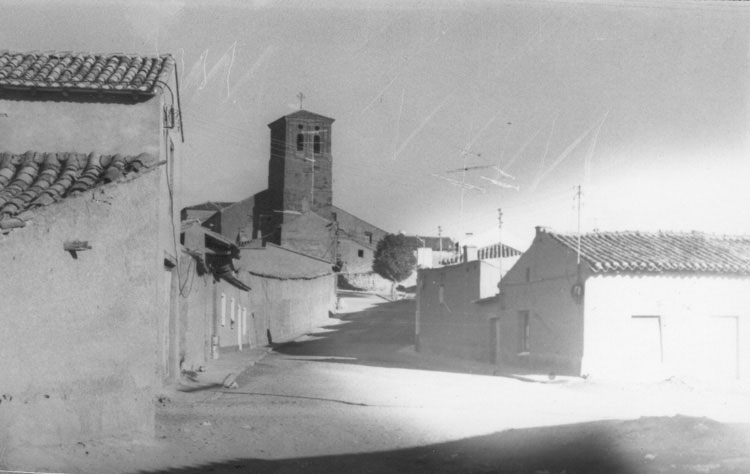

- Location within Castile and León Location within Spain
- Coordinates: 42°01′57″N 5°08′57″W
- Country: Spain
- Autonomous community: Castile and León
- Province: Valladolid
- Municipality: Ceinos de Campos

Area
  - Total: 36 km^{2} (14 sq mi)

Population (2025-01-01)
  - Total: 172
  - Density: 4.8/km^{2} (12/sq mi)
- Time zone: UTC+1 (CET)
  - Summer (DST): UTC+2 (CEST)

Ceinos de Campos is a municipality located in the province of Valladolid, Castile and León, Spain.

According to the 2004 census (INE), the municipality had a population of 278 inhabitants.

== See also ==
- Templar church of Saint Mary (Ceinos de Campos), demolished.
