= Torneo Tenis Playa =

Exhibition
- Founded: 1971
- Location: Luanco; Spain
- Venue: Playa de La Ribera
- Surface: Sand beach
- Website: Official Page

The Torneo Tenis Playa, also named as Trofeo Juan Avendaño is an exhibition tennis tournament played annually in La Ribera beach in Luanco, Asturias, Spain.

It is the only tennis tournament in the world organized on the sand of a beach, during low tide. Stands installed on the beach seat 2,000 spectators.

== History ==
The first tournament was played in 1971, by initiative of a group of friends who didn't have any court to play in the town. In 1973, Juan Avendaño played his first tournament and since that year it has grown in popularity. In 1995, the tournament was re-organized due to Avendaño and other professional players that started to play.

The tournament is played between July and August, when the low tide comes in the night. In 2006, the Torneo Tenis Playa was declared as tourist interest activity and is now broadcast on TV by Asturian TPA.

In 2014, the board of the Torneo Tenis Playa did not reach any agreement for the organization of the tournament and it was not played. This agreement arrived in January 2015, and it was announced the tournament would be recovered for July 2015, but ultimately the tournament did not take place.

After a stint of seven years without being played, the tournament was due to return in 2020. However, due to the COVID-19 pandemic it was postponed for one more year.

== Tournament winners ==
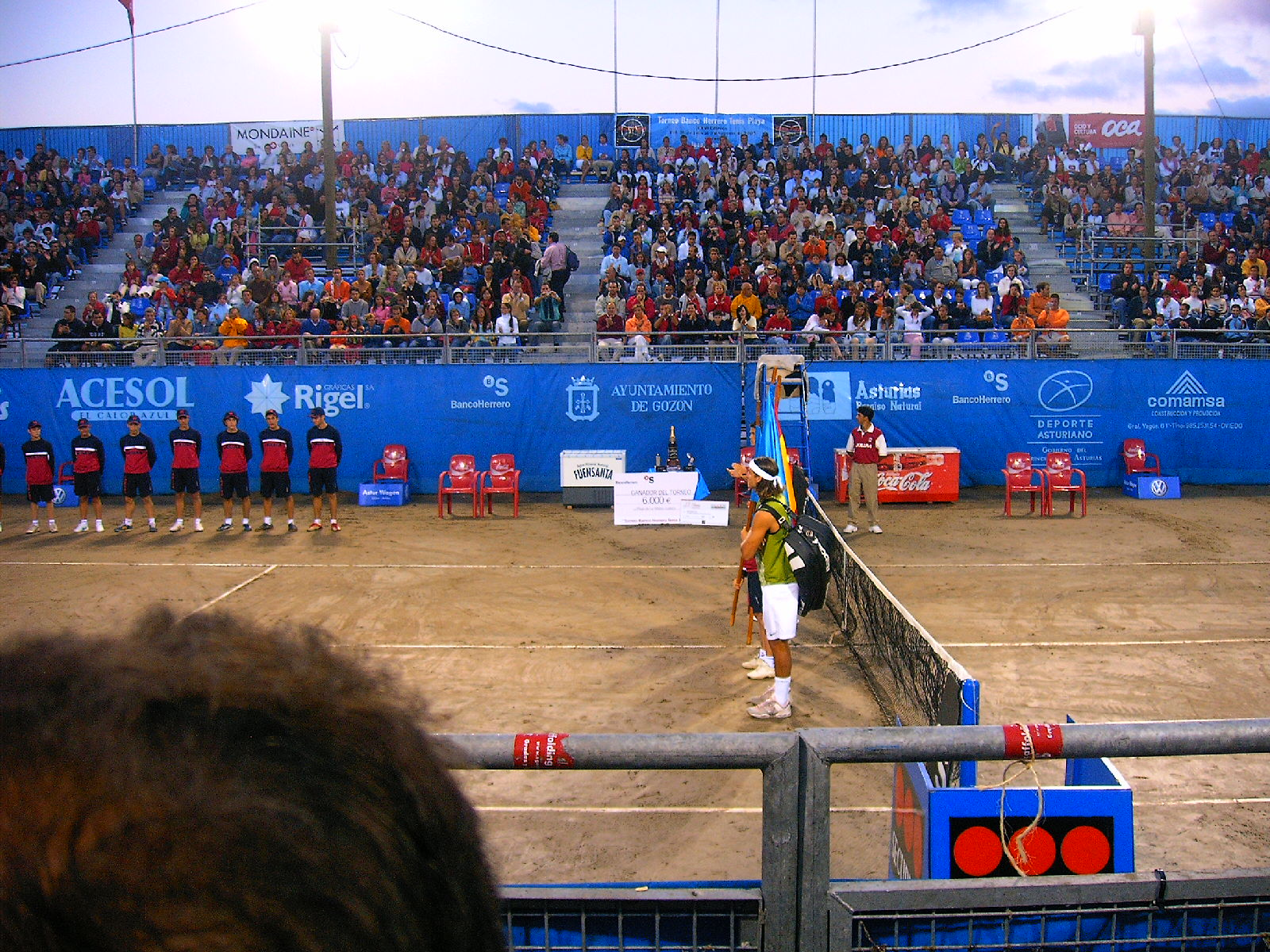
Feliciano López, before the final of the 2005 edition.

Year	Winner	Runner-up	Score
1971	(Spain) José Antonio Fernández Badalla	(Spain) Francisco Artime	
1972	(Spain) Francisco Artime	(Spain) Chema Ayala	
1973	(Spain) Jacinto Aramendi	(Spain) Luis García Sanz	
1974	(Spain) Juan Avendaño	(Spain) Guillermo Ocio	
1975	(Spain) Juan Avendaño	(Spain) Horacio Arias	
1976	(Spain) Juan Avendaño	(Spain) Rufino Orejas	
1977	(Spain) Juan Avendaño	(Spain) Luis Orejas	
1978	(Spain) Juan Manuel Hidalgo	(Spain) Juan Avendaño	
1979	(Spain) Juan Avendaño	(Spain) Carlos Landó	
1980	(Spain) Juan Avendaño	(Spain) Juan Manuel Hidalgo	
1981	(Spain) Juan Avendaño	(Spain) Miguel Mir	
1982	(Chile) Jaime Fillol	(Spain) Miguel Mir	
1983	(Spain) Juan Avendaño	(Argentina) Eduardo Bengoechea	
1984	(Spain) Juan Avendaño	(Spain) Javier Soler	6–4, 6–4
1985	(Spain) Sergio Casal	(Spain) Juan Avendaño	2–6, 6–3, 6–2
No tournament between 1986 and 1994
1995	(Spain) Francisco Clavet	(Spain) Carlos Moyá	6–4, 6–3
1996	(Spain) Francisco Clavet	(Spain) Carlos Moyá	6–2, 6–3, 7–5
1997	(Spain) Félix Mantilla	(Spain) Albert Portas	6–1, 6–3
1998	(Spain) Àlex Corretja	(Spain) Alberto Martín	6–2, 3–6, 6–4
1999	(Spain) Carlos Moyá	(Spain) Fernando Vicente	6–4, 7–6^{(7–1)}
2000	(Spain) Juan Carlos Ferrero	(Spain) Alberto Berasategui	6–4, 6–3
2001	(Spain) Albert Portas	(Spain) Francisco Clavet	6–2, 6–2
2002	(Spain) Francisco Clavet	(France) Cédric Pioline	6–3, 6–4
2003	(Morocco) Younes El Aynaoui	(Spain) Alberto Martín	6–3, 6–3
2004	(Spain) Alberto Martín	(Spain) Àlex Corretja	6–1, 6–3
2005	(Spain) Fernando Verdasco	(Spain) Feliciano López	7–5, 7–5
2006	(Argentina) Guillermo Cañas	(Spain) Nicolás Almagro	7–6^{(7–5)}, 6–7^{(4–7)}, [7–5]
2007	(Spain) Feliciano López	(Spain) Félix Mantilla	7–6^{(7–2)}, 3–6, 7–6^{(7–5)}
2008	(Spain) Juan Carlos Ferrero	(Spain) Carlos Moyá	7–6^{(7–3)}, 6–4
2009	(Spain) David Ferrer	(Argentina) Guillermo Cañas	10–9^{(7–5)}
2010	(Spain) Nicolás Almagro	(Spain) David Ferrer	6–4, 7–6^{(7–5)}
2011	(Spain) Albert Montañés	(Spain) Carlos Moyá	1–6, 6–3, 6–2
2012	(Spain) Albert Ramos	(Spain) Daniel Muñoz	7–6^{(7–4)}, 7–5
2013	(Spain) Tommy Robredo	(Spain) Nicolás Almagro	6–4, 7–6^{(7–3)}
No tournament between 2014 and 2021
2022	(Spain) Pablo Carreño	(Spain) Feliciano López	6–4, 6–2
2023	(Lithuania) Edas Butvilas	(Spain) Miguel Avendaño	6–4, 6–1
2024	(Argentina) Diego Schwartzman	(Argentina) Pedro Cachín	6–3, 3–6, [10–3]
2025	(France) Richard Gasquet	(Austria) Dominic Thiem	6–4, 6–4

== 2009 ==
Due to heavy rain, the final was played with a format of only one set where the winner was the first one to achieve ten games.

Qualifying round
2 August
(Chile) Nicolás Piñones	7	6
(Spain) Ignacio González	6	1
3 August
(Portugal) João Sousa	6	6
(France) Loïc Ducourau	2	3

Quarter-finals
3 August
(Argentina) Mariano Zabaleta	7	6
(Chile) Nicolás Piñones	5	1
4 August
(Argentina) Guillermo Cañas	6	6
(Portugal) João Sousa	2	2

Semi-finals
5 August
(Spain) David Ferrer	6	6
(Argentina) Mariano Zabaleta	4	4
4 August
(Argentina) Guillermo Cañas	7	7
(Spain) Nicolás Almagro	6	6

Final
5 August
(Spain) David Ferrer	10
(Argentina) Guillermo Cañas	9

== 2010 ==
Qualifying round
2 August
(Spain) Carlos Bautista	6	6
(Spain) Ignacio González	2	4

Quarter-finals
3 August
(Spain) Nicolás Almagro	6	6
(Spain) Pablo Carreño	4	3
2 August
(Russia) Igor Andreev	6	6
(Spain) Axel Álvarez	1	4
3 August
(Argentina) Juan Ignacio Chela	6	6
(Spain) Carlos Bautista	2	2

Semi-finals
4 August
(Spain) Nicolás Almagro	7	7
(Russia) Igor Andreev	5	5
4 August
(Spain) David Ferrer	7	6
(Argentina) Juan Ignacio Chela	6	4

Final
5 August
(Spain) Nicolás Almagro	6	7
(Spain) David Ferrer	4	6

== 2011 ==
Qualifying round
27 July
Ignacio González	3	6	2
Carlos Bautista	6	4	6

Quarter-finals
27 July
Pere Riba	6	6
Axel Álvarez	1	2
28 July
Albert Montañés	6	6
Roberto Ortega	3	2
28 July
Carlos Moyá	7	6
Carlos Bautista	5	2

Semi-finals
29 July
Pere Riba	4	4
Albert Montañés	6	6
29 July
Pablo Andújar	1	5
Carlos Moyá	6	7

Final
30 July
Albert Montañés	1	6	6
Carlos Moyá	6	3	2

== 2012 ==
Pos	Team	Pld	Pts	RAM	MUÑ	FER	MON
1	Albert Ramos	3	5	—	6–4, 6–4	—	—
2	Daniel Muñoz	3	5	—	—	—	—
3	Juan Carlos Ferrero	3	4	5–7, 3–6	2–6, 1–6	—	6–4, 6–3
4	Albert Montañés	3	4	6–2, 6–4	4–6, 6–7	—	—

Final
2 August
Albert Ramos	7	7
Daniel Muñoz	6	5

== 2013 ==
Quarter-finals
30 July
(Portugal) João Sousa	6	6
(Spain) Miguel Álvarez Hevia	1	2
31 July
(Spain) Tommy Robredo	6	6
(Spain) Eduardo Segura	2	1
30 July
(Spain) Marc López	6	6
(Spain) Ramón del Olmo	0	2
31 July
(Spain) Nicolás Almagro	6	6
(Spain) Juan Lizariturry	4	3

Semi-finals
1 August
(Portugal) João Sousa	4	4
(Spain) Tommy Robredo	6	6
1 August
(Spain) Marc López	3	4
(Spain) Nicolás Almagro	6	6

Final
2 August
(Spain) Tommy Robredo	6	7
(Spain) Nicolás Almagro	4	6

== 2022 ==
Quarter-finals
27 July
(Spain) Tommy Robredo	6	6
(Spain) Miguel Avendaño	4	3
26 July
(Spain) Feliciano López	6	6
(Russia) Pavel Petrov	1	1
27 July
(Spain) Pablo Carreño	6	6
(Spain) Gerard Planelles	4	4
26 July
(Spain) Marc López	4	6
(Lithuania) Edas Butvilas	6	7

Semi-finals
28 July
(Spain) Tommy Robredo	4	4
(Spain) Feliciano López	6	6
28 July
(Spain) Pablo Carreño	6	5	[10]
(Lithuania) Edas Butvilas	3	7	[2]

Final
29 July
(Spain) Feliciano López	4	2
(Spain) Pablo Carreño	6	6

== 2023 ==
First round
29 July
(United States) Garrett Johns	6	6
(Spain) Iker Sevilla	4	4
29 July
(Spain) Miguel Avendaño	3	6	[10]
(Spain) Luis Llorens	6	2	[7]

Second round
30 July
(Lithuania) Edas Butvilas	4	7	[10]
(United States) Garrett Johns	6	5	[6]
30 July
(Spain) Feliciano López	3	6
(Spain) Miguel Avendaño	6	7

Semi-finals
31 July
(Spain) Bernabé Zapata	2	6	[8]
(Lithuania) Edas Butvilas	6	4	[10]
31 July
(France) Richard Gasquet	3	6	[8]
(Spain) Miguel Avendaño	6	3	[10]

Final
1 August
(Lithuania) Edas Butvilas	6	6
(Spain) Miguel Avendaño	4	1

== 2024 ==
First round
16 July
(Spain) Luis Llorens	6	6	[6]
(Spain) Iker Sevilla	7	6	[10]
16 July
(Spain) Miguel Avendaño	6	6
(Ukraine) Roman Venger	3	4

Second round
17 July
(Lithuania) Edas Butvilas	6	7
(Spain) Iker Sevilla	3	6
17 July
(Spain) Pablo Andújar	6	7
(Spain) Miguel Avendaño	2	6

Semi-finals
18 July
(Argentina) Pedro Cachín	7	4	[10]
(Lithuania) Edas Butvilas	6	6	[6]
18 July
(Argentina) Diego Schwartzman	5	6	[10]
(Spain) Pablo Andújar	7	2	[1]

Final
19 July
(Argentina) Pedro Cachín	3	6	[3]
(Argentina) Diego Schwartzman	6	3	[10]

== 2025 ==
First round
4 August
(Argentina) Pedro Cachín	6	6
(Spain) Bernardo Munk	3	3
4 August
(France) Benoît Paire	5	4
(Spain) Miguel Avendaño	7	6

Second round
5 August
(Lithuania) Edas Butvilas	3	6	[11]
(Spain) Miguel Avendaño	6	2	[9]
5 August
(Spain) Bernabé Zapata	6	7
(Argentina) Pedro Cachín	4	6

Semi-finals
6 August
(France) Richard Gasquet	6	7
(Lithuania) Edas Butvilas	4	6
6 August
(Austria) Dominic Thiem	6	7
(Spain) Bernabé Zapata	4	5

Final
7 August
(France) Richard Gasquet	6	6
(Austria) Dominic Thiem	4	4
