= Iglesia de Santa María (Limanes) =

- Iglesia de Santa María (Limanes)
- Location: Asturias, Spain

Iglesia de Santa María (Limanes) is a church in Asturias, Spain. It is listed as a Bien de Interés Cultural.

It is located in the village of Vallín, civil parish of Limanes.
