= Iglesia de Santa María (Piedeloro) =

Coordinates: 43°33′45″N 5°48′38″W

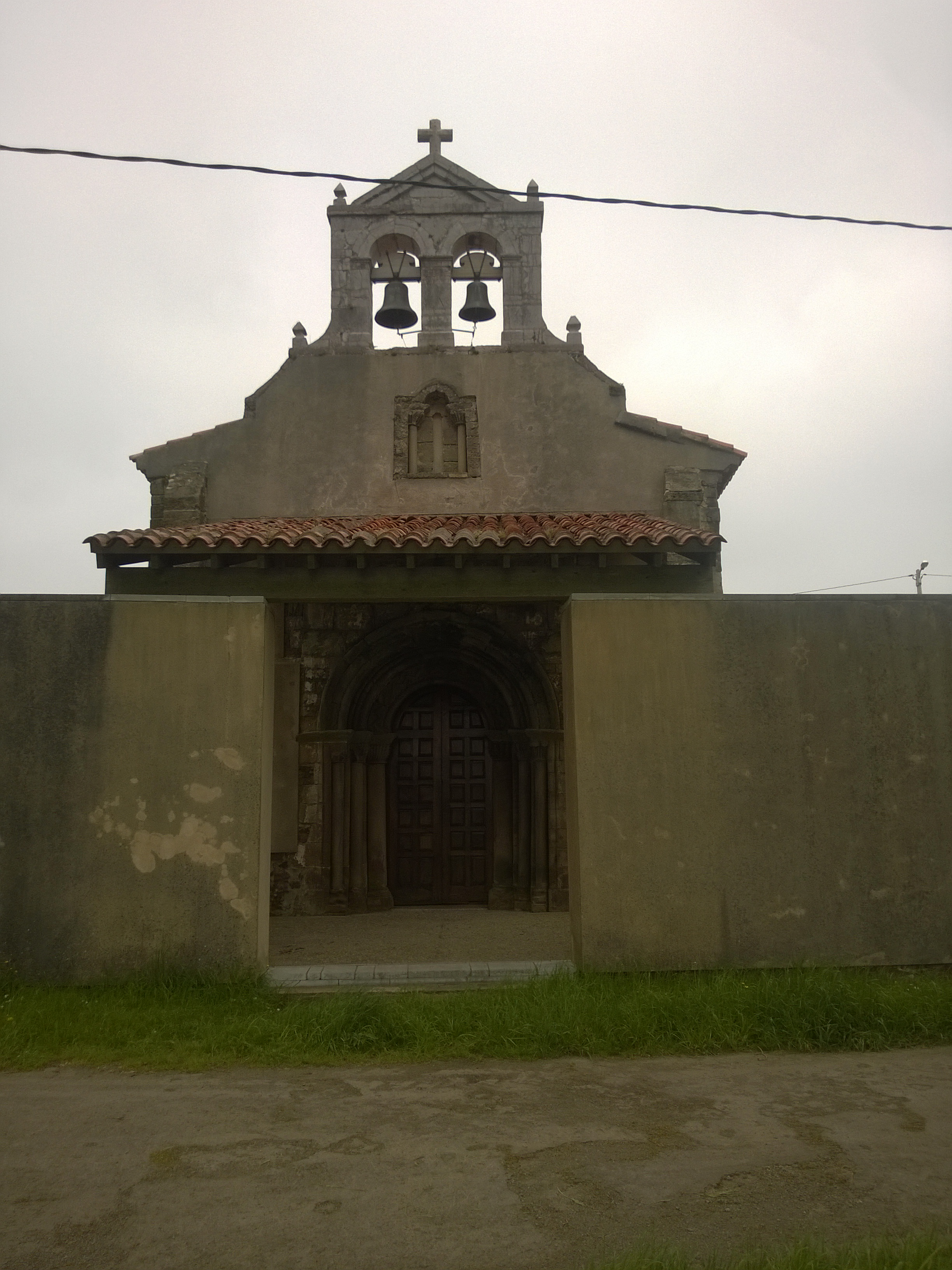
- Iglesia de Santa María (Piedeloro)
- Location: Asturias, Spain

Iglesia de Santa María (Piedeloro) is a church in Asturias, Spain.
