= Iglesia de Santa María (Oviedo) =

- Location: Oviedo, Asturias, Spain

Iglesia de Santa María in Oviedo was a defunct church, formerly located within the complex formed by the Iglesia de San Salvador, the original Iglesia de San Tirso, and the Iglesia de Santa Leocadia.

The construction of the temple was ordered by Alfonso II el Casto in the 9th century as part of the building of the aforementioned structures. It was located on the northern side of the Iglesia de San Salvador. The building was a basílica with three naves, divided into six bays by arcos de medio punto. The cabecera had a triple rectangular plan and featured a blind arcade.

The iglesia had three altars: the main one dedicated to the Virgen María, and two smaller ones dedicated to San Esteban and San Julián.

Three sculpted heads from a calvario dating from the 12th century—originally placed in the cabecera—have been preserved.

== See also ==
- Asturian art
- Catholic Church in Spain
- Churches in Asturias
- List of oldest church buildings
