= Iglesia de Santa María (Noreña) =

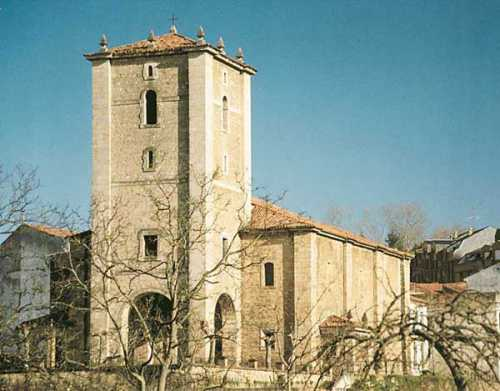
- Iglesia de Santa María (Noreña)
- 43.3939°N 5.7120°W
- Location: Asturias, Spain

Iglesia de Santa María (Noreña) is a church in Asturias, Spain.
