= Iglesia de Santa María (Monasterio de Hermo) =

Coordinates: 42°58′41″N 6°32′21″W

- Iglesia de Santa María (Monasterio de Hermo)
- Location: Asturias, Spain

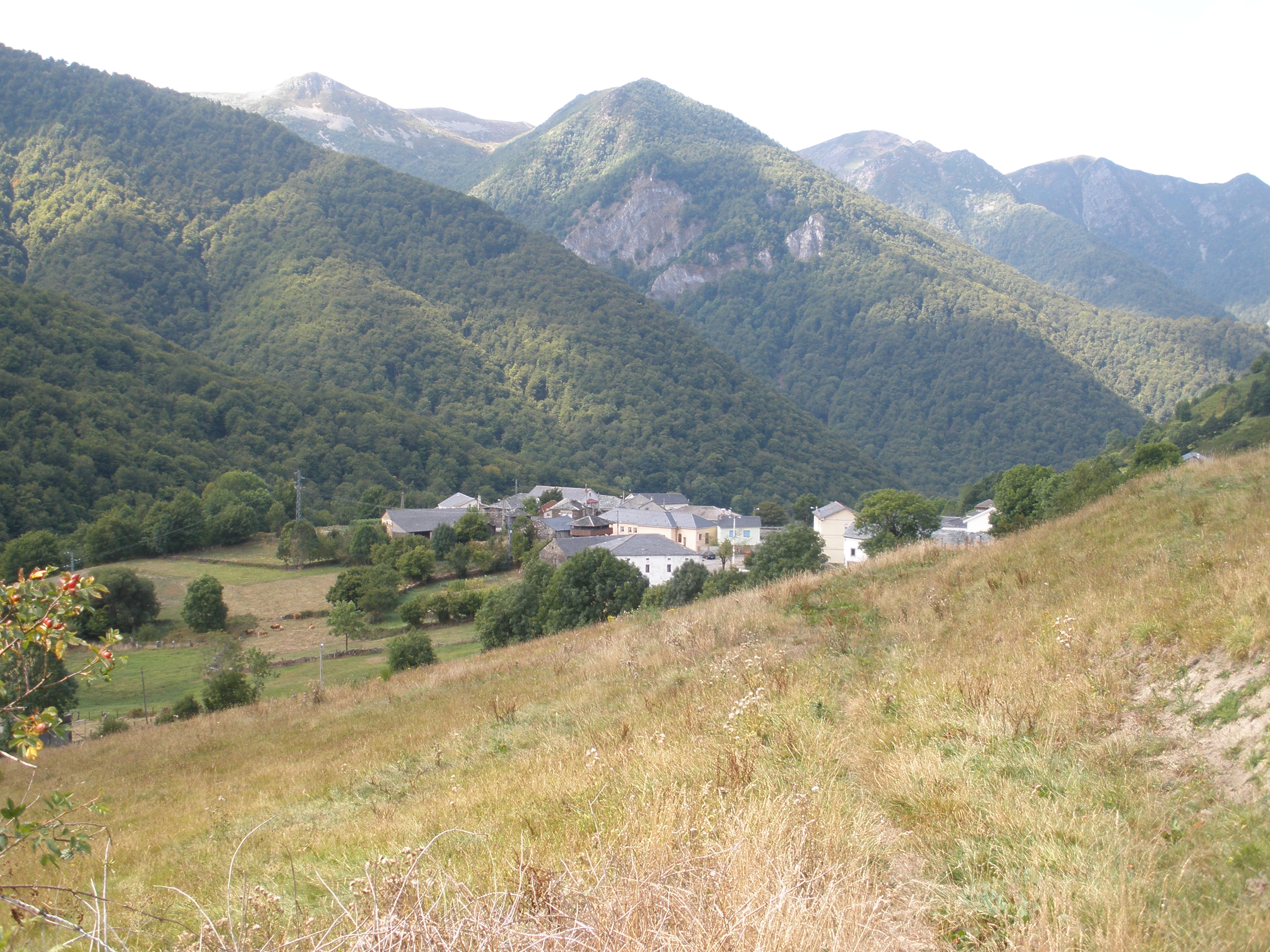
Monasterio de Hermo

Iglesia de Santa María (Monasterio de Hermo) is a church in Asturias, Spain.
