= Iglesia de Santa María (Llanes) =

- Iglesia de Santa María (Llanes)
- Location: Llanes, Asturias, Spain

Iglesia de Santa María (Llanes) is a church in Llanes, Asturias, Spain. The church was established in the 15th century.

== See also ==
- Asturian art
- Catholic Church in Spain
