= Iglesia de Santa María (Arbazal) =

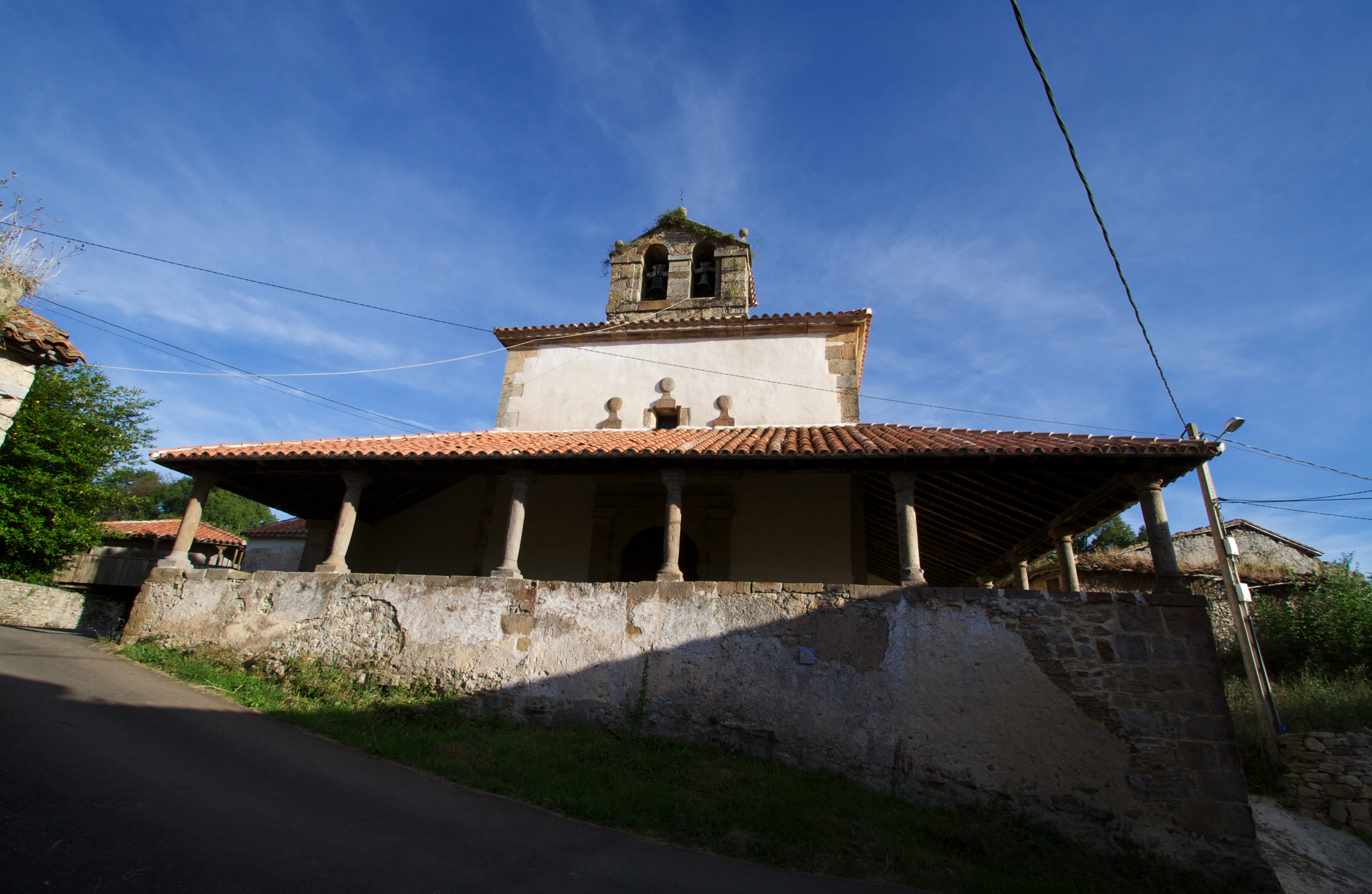
- Iglesia de Santa María (Arbazal)
- 43°20′31″N 6°28′47″W
- Location: Asturias, Spain

Iglesia de Santa María (Arbazal) is a 13th-century (romanesque, or "romanica") church in the concejo of Villaviciosa, in the Principality of Asturias, Spain. It is unusual in having preserved the fabric of an earlier construction dated between the 8th and 10th centuries.
