= Iglesia de Santa María (Sebrayo) =

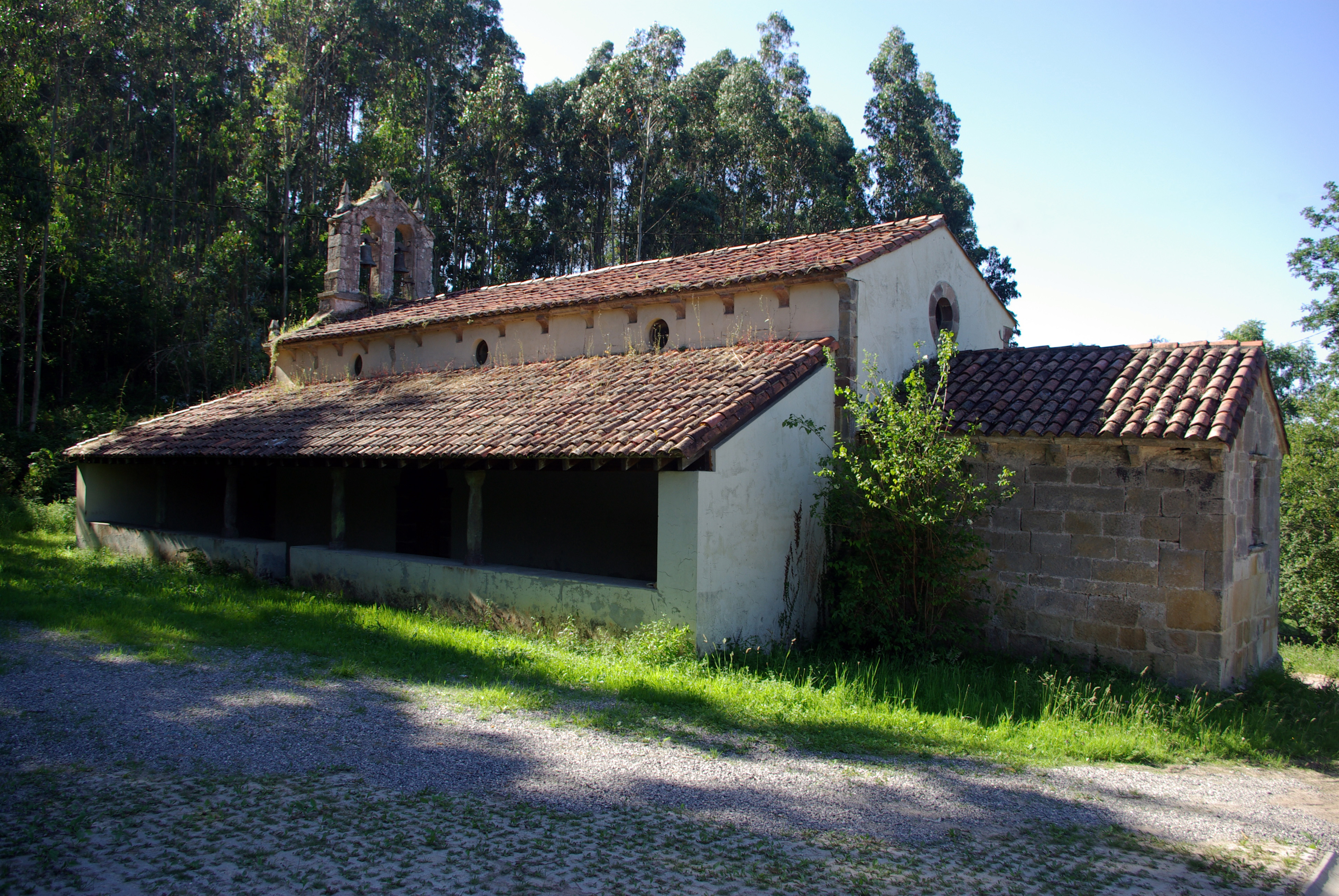
- Iglesia de Santa María (Sebrayo)
- 43.49388°N 5.37615°W
- Location: Asturias, Spain

Iglesia de Santa María (Sebrayo) is a church in Asturias, Spain.
