= Iglesia de Santa María (Villamayor) =

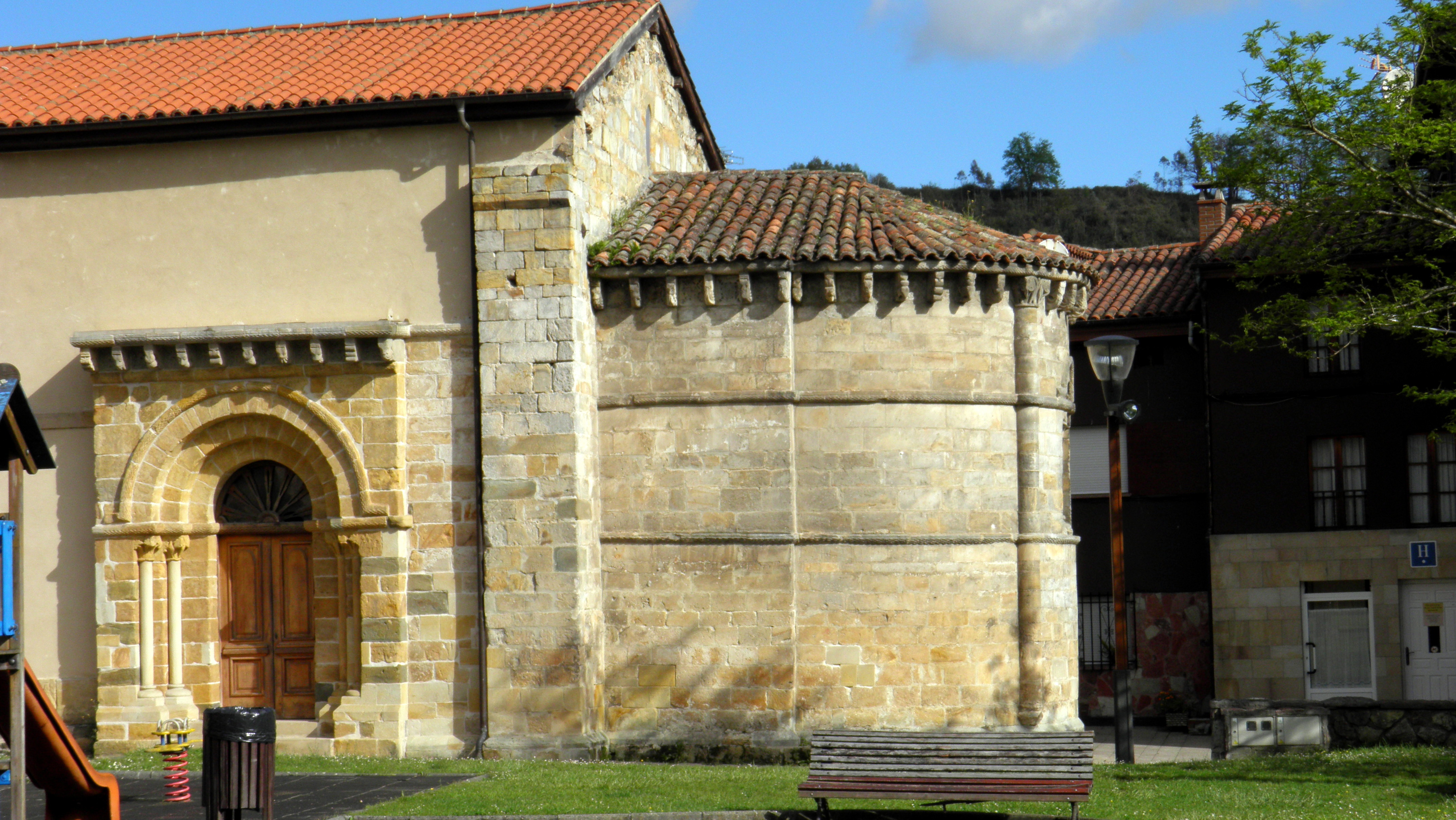
- Iglesia de Santa María (Villamayor)
- 43.3594°N 5.3065°W
- Location: Asturias, Spain

Iglesia de Santa María (Villamayor) is a church in Asturias, Spain. It was established in the 10th century and was run initially as a convent.
