= Iglesia de Santa María (San Antolín de Ibias) =

- Location: Asturias, Spain

Iglesia de Santa María (San Antolín de Ibias) is a church in Asturias, Spain. Established in the 11th century, the nave is separated from the chancel by a large arch. The apse is divided into two areas separated by lines of imposts.
