= Iglesia de Santa María (Soto de Luiña) =

Church in Soto de Luiña, Asturias, Spain

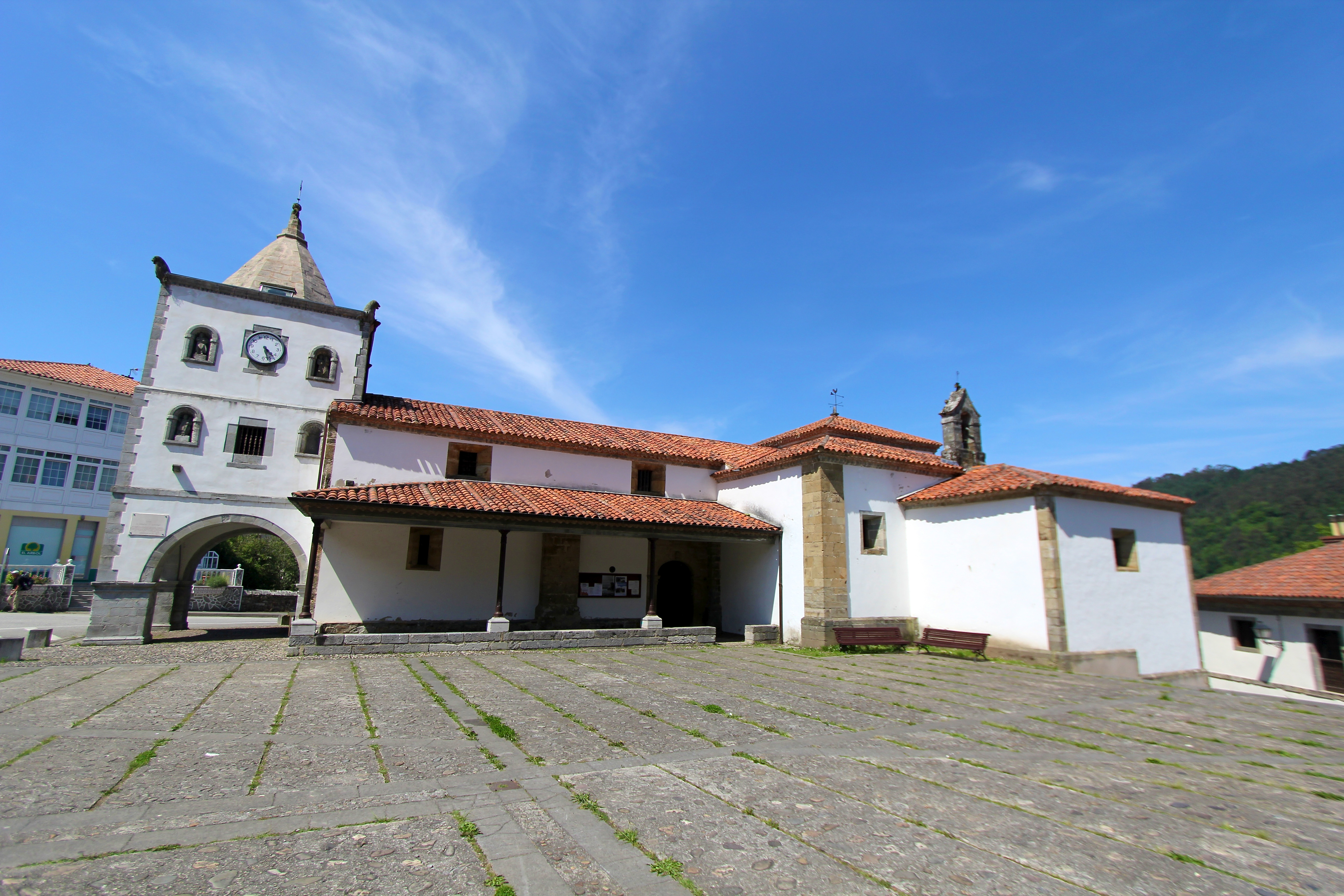

Religion
- Ecclesiastical or organizational status: Church

Location
- Location: Cudillero (Asturias), Spain
- Interactive map of Iglesia de Santa María (Soto de Luiña)
- Coordinates: 43.561883°N 6.230487°W

Architecture
- UNESCO World Heritage Site
- Type: Cultural
- Criteria: ii, iv, vi
- Designated: 1993 (17th session)
- Parent listing: Routes of Santiago de Compostela: Camino Francés and Routes of Northern Spain
- Reference no.: 669bis-014
- Region: Europe and North America
- Spanish Cultural Heritage
- Type: Non-movable
- Criteria: Monument
- Designated: 28 November 1996
- Reference no.: RI-51-0009584

Iglesia de Santa María (Soto de Luiña) is a church in Asturias, Spain. It was built in the 18th century and is located in the municipality of Cudillero, in the principality of Asturias (Spain). Together with the Rectory House (Casa Rectoral), it forms an old pilgrim’s hospital connected to the Camino de Santiago.

It was constructed over a previous chapel or hermitage, located over an old spring that gave the place a certain divine character.

The temple has the floor plan of a latin cross, with three naves and 3 chapels, with a semicircular apse and a square tower at the foot, in grey stone and blank walls, with semicircular arches, 3 floors, and stone and wood niches. The lateral porticos are supported by columns. It ends with an octagonal capital of exposed ashlars crowned by one giant stone. In the corners there are zoomorphic gargoyles.

The first work carried out was the tower, designed by Master Domingo Fernández; almost parallel to it, the Main and Rosary chapels were built, with this work being finished by Pedro García. Later, and after a long dispute with the town, the Saint Inés chapel was built by Don Lope Matías Menéndez de Luarca y Tiena, and in the mid-18th century the work on the central nave was finished, with arches, doors, and windows.

The main altarpiece, in Baroque style and probably the work of José Bernardo de Mena, is dedicated to Our Lady of Humility, with images by the Asturian sculptor Antonio Baroja. On the right is the altarpiece of the Rosary, where the Tree of the Life of Jesus is represented; and on the left is the altarpiece of Saint Agnes, where the Tree of the Birth of Jesus is represented.

Above the main door there is an inscription with the following text:

YEAR 1782 ASYLUM CHURCH

After the restoration that was carried out in 1984, the church was declared an artistic-historic monument.

Among the movable goods of the parish, the silver Processional Cross, dated to 1609, catches the eye. It can be attributed to the goldsmith of Valladolid Juan de Nápoles Mudarra, of excellent quality and one of the best of Spain. There is also a silver monstrance from the 17th century and an important documentary collection from the 17th century.
