= Iglesia de Santa María (Arzabal) =

- Location: Asturias, Spain

Iglesia de Santa María (Arzabal) is a church in Asturias, Spain.
