= Iglesia de Santa María (Cerredo) =

- Iglesia de Santa María (Cerredo)
- 42.947072°N 6.49053°W
- Location: Asturias, Spain

Iglesia de Santa María (Cerredo) is a church in Asturias, Spain.
