= Vallin =

Vallin or Vallín is a surname. Notable people with the surname include:

- Ari Vallin (born 1978), Finnish ice hockey player
- Charles Vallin (1903–1948), French politician
- Émile Vallin (1833–1924), French military physician
- Eugène Vallin (1856–1922), French furniture designer and manufacturer
- Jean-Baptiste Michel Vallin de la Mothe (1729–1800), French architect
- Louis Vallin (1770–1854), French general
- Ninon Vallin (1886–1961), French soprano
- Rick Vallin (1919–1977), Russian American actor
- Sergio Vallin
- Veikko Vallin (born 1962), Finnish politician
