= Iglesia de Santa María del Temple (Ceinos de Campos) =

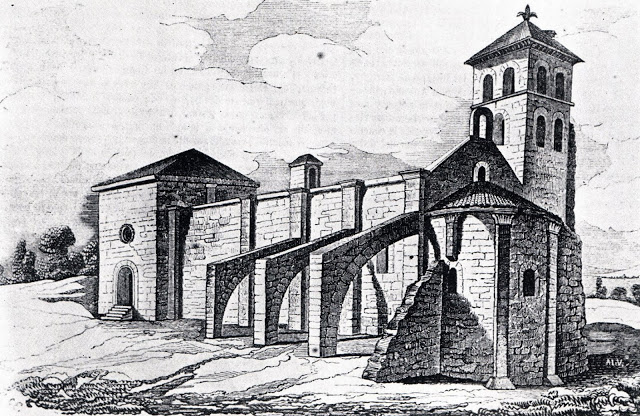
Exterior of the Iglesia de Santa María del Temple published in the old Seminario Pintoresco Español.

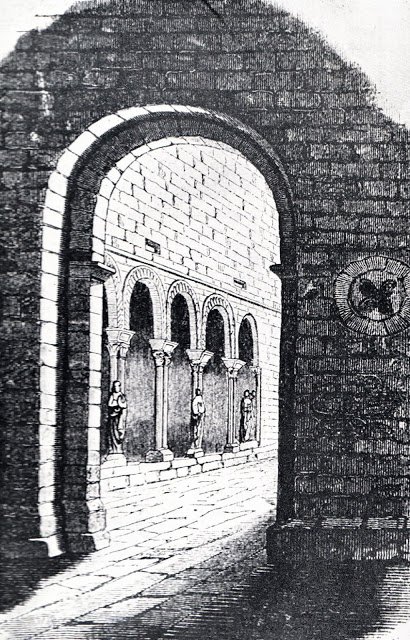
Interior of the Iglesia de Santa María del Temple.

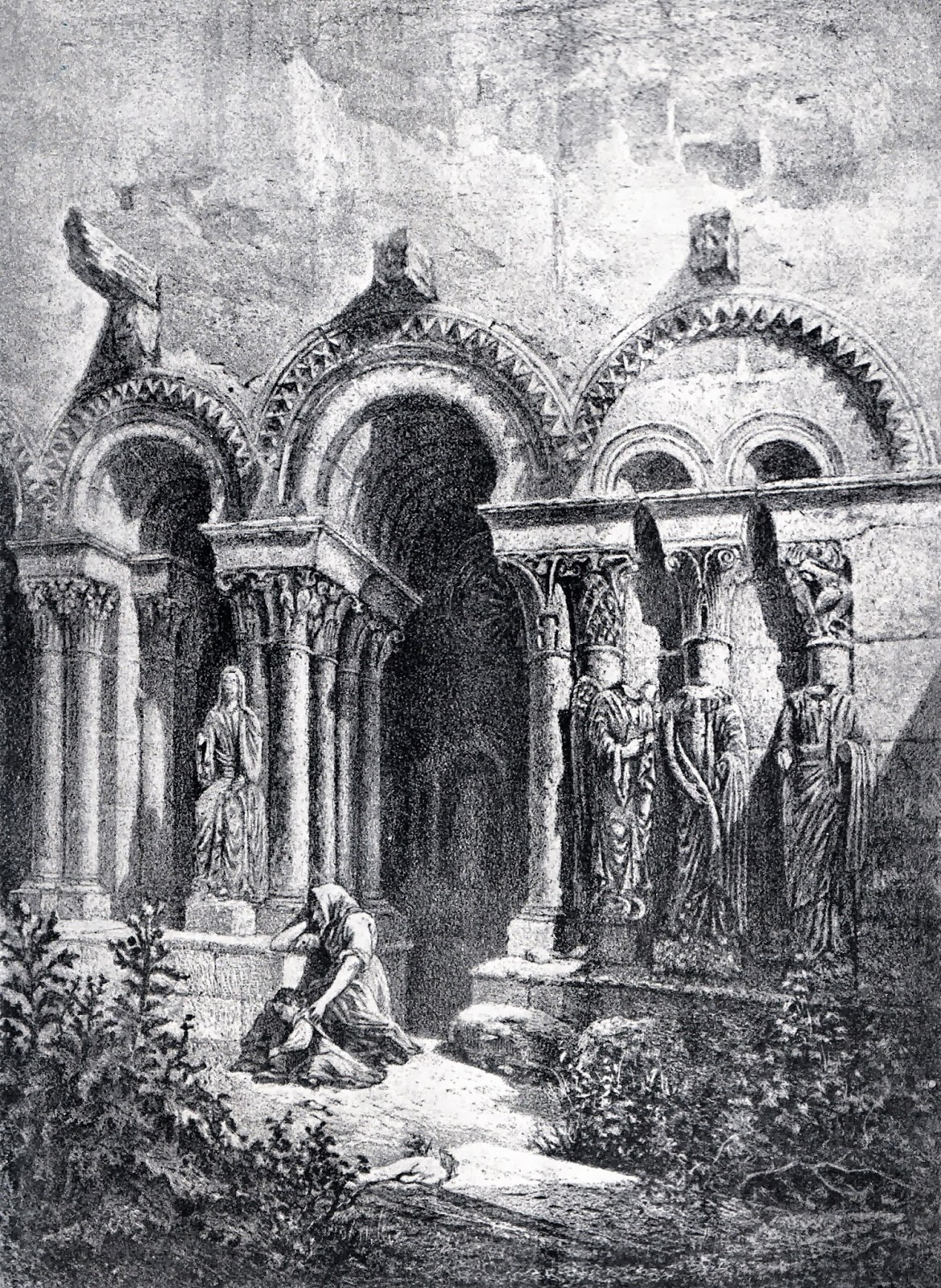
Arcaded gallery of the chapel of Lara (13th c.) of the Iglesia de Santa María del Temple. Drawing by Francesc Parcerisa in 1860.

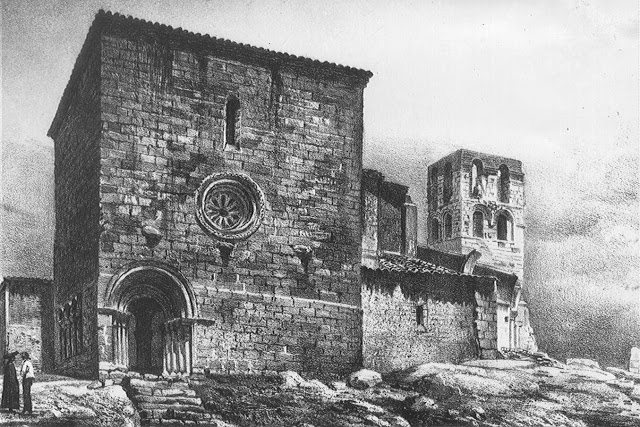
Iglesia de Santa María del Temple. Drawing by Francesc Parcerisa in 1860.

The Iglesia de Santa María del Temple (Church of Saint Mary of the Templars) was a Romanesque church located in the town of Ceinos de Campos, in Castile and León (Spain).

The history of this monument José María Quadrado summarized in a few words:

The town of Ceinos, poor, dark, reduced, possessed a jewel able to make conceited to the most affluent cities; and this gem have destroyed in cold blood, on a whim, on the edge of the road where, surprised the travelers stopped to contemplate.

== History and description ==
In Ceinos de Campos was the oldest encomienda of the Order of the Knights Templars in the Kingdom of León, cited already in 1168, comparable in importance to the Ponferrada and Faro. Don Gonzalo Núñez de Lara, regent of Henry I, who opposed the enthronement of Ferdinand III of Castile, was exiled to Muslim lands. He died in Baeza, in 1222, and in his will he arranged to be buried in the Templar chapel in Ceinos de Campos, where he was transferred to a rich tomb.

The church, of Romanesque factory, had a single nave divided into four sections, with the normal attachments of semicircular apse and tower. The apse, with exceptional sculptural richness in its columns and capitals, both internally and externally; the tower, with two floors of windows, decorated its archivolts with double thread of quadrangular stars, it was covered with slate pyramidal spire. Outside the nave, the Romanesque buttresses must have appeared weak in the Gothic period, when flying buttresses were added.

The most beautiful and spectacular part of the monument was another, consisting of the square enclosure, extending west of the church, composing a chapel in which the artists overstepped niceties. Halfway up the section, the square became octagon with four scallops, under each the corresponding sculptural emblem of the Tetramorph. From that level, eight columns formed the flashlight or clerestory, and of these tore the edges arming the dome, and closed at its key with a Lamb of God medallion. Meant one of the clear influences of the domes cycle of the Douro, led by the Cathedrals of Zamora and Salamanca and the collegiate church of Toro, and extended to the later echo of Plasencia, in its Chapter House.

But the sights of this chapel did not end here. If each section of the lantern lit the inside by double windows, the low walls themselves developed semicircular arches hosting images, and two of the sides opened to the outside. Fortunately, Parcerisa copied in oil painting, then reproduced in lithography, part of the cloistered arches, seen from the outside. It is three unequal and another blind arches, all with archivolts, with diamond tips, supported by pillars with beams of not less than eight columns, with high floral and figurative capitals. Next to the serving of door, another arch, the blind and the gemed that rests on three pillars, attaches to these caryatids of the best Romanesque sculpture. The such caryatids as Parcerisa met it beheaded. But a seated Virgin, on the other side of the entrance arch, itself kept whole.

In the words of Gaya Nuño:

Sculptural wealth such, showing luxury of economic resources and work of sculptors of very first order within an already well advanced 12th century, what informs all ornamental details, it is not easy to explain, even admitting the relationship of this monument with the Order of the Templars. But in the absence of historical information, there in Ceinos de Campos was the pilgrim building, undoubtedly the most notable of the Romanesque Valladolidan (province).

In 1799 the neoclassical architect Francisco Álvarez Benavides considered its demolition, but the attack did not hurt but some parts of the precious monument. Then the church was used to convert it into a cemetery. In 1853 and 1860 it is being completed the ruin, and years later, the Sculpture Museum of Valladolid acquired, from the owners of the chapel, some of the sculptural remains and arches of the gallery described. In 4,000 pesetas were bought three arches, two window arches, four columns, six capitals and a few of sculptural fragments of the caryatids. Yet it could mounted on the stretch that connected the entrance of the College of San Gregorio with the Chapel of it a memory of what had been quite a splendid monument. At present the remains brought by the Sculpture Museum of Valladolid are located in Ceinos. Also in some houses in Ceinos de Campos are preserved certain architectural elements that belonged to the church.

== See also ==
- List of missing landmarks in Spain
