= Iglesia de Santa María (Lugás) =

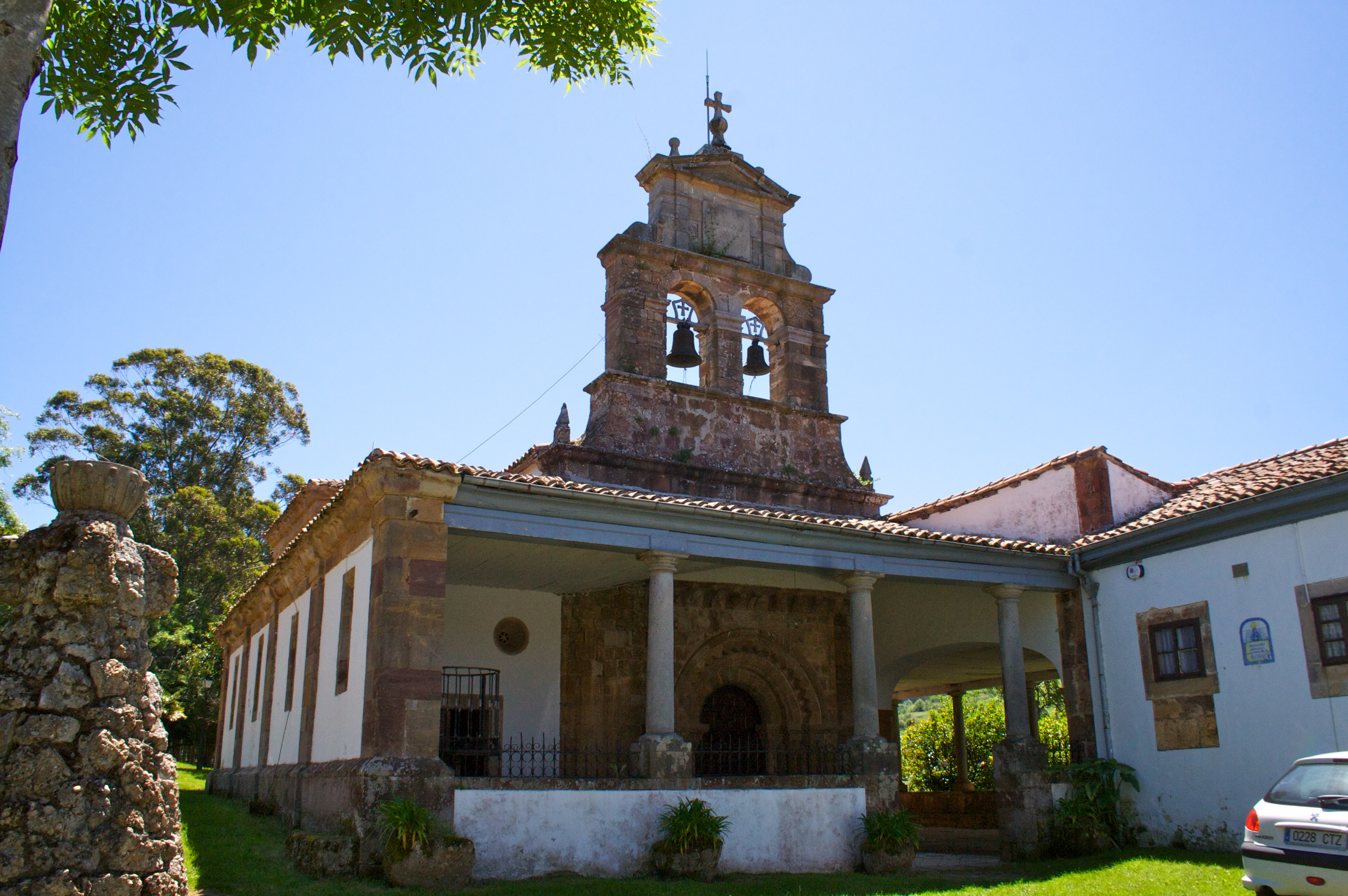
- Iglesia de Santa María (Lugás)
- 43°27′10″N 5°25′43″W
- Location: Asturias, Spain

Iglesia de Santa María (Lugás) is a church in Asturias, Spain.
