= Iglesia de Santa María (Luanco) =

Coordinates: 43°37′00″N 5°47′17″W

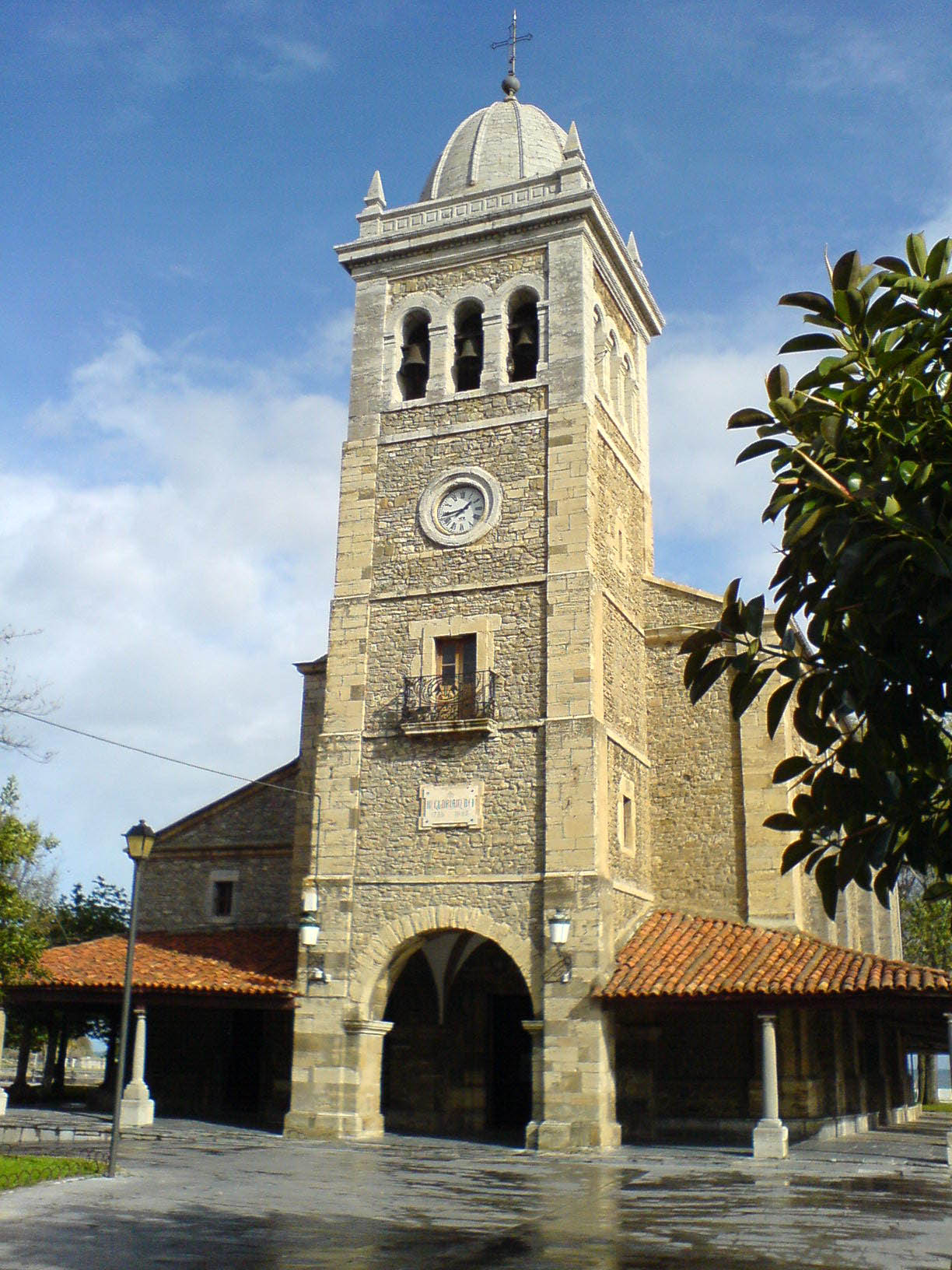
- Iglesia de Santa María (Luanco)
- Location: Asturias, Spain

Iglesia de Santa María (Luanco) is a church in Asturias, Spain.
