= Héctor Valdivielso Sáez =

Saint Héctor Antonio Valdivielso Sáez
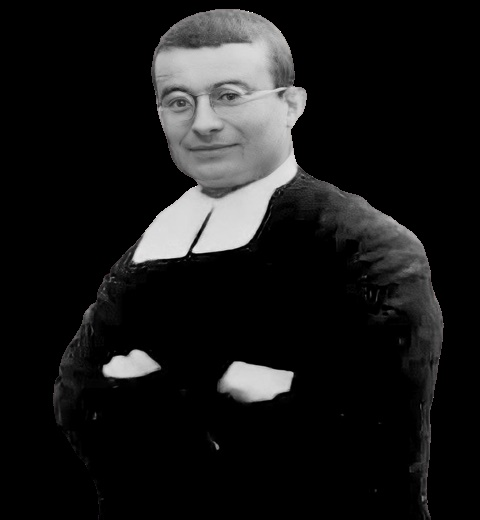

Benedict of Jesus, Benito de Jesus
- Born: October 29, 1910; Buenos Aires, Argentina
- Died: October 9, 1934 (24 years old); Turón, Asturias, Spain
- Cause of death: execution
- Honored in: Catholic Church
- Beatified: April 29, 1990 by Pope John Paul II
- Canonized: November 21, 1999 by Pope John Paul II
- Feast: October 9,

Saint Héctor Antonio Valdivielso Sáez (October 29, 1910 - October 9, 1934) also known as Saint Benedict of Jesus or Saint Benito de Jesus, was a Catholic Spanish-Argentinan brother for the De La Salle Brothers, who was killed during the Asturian Revolution of 1934 and was one of the Martyrs of Turon and was canonized by Pope John Paul II, becoming the first saint from Argentina and the country's first Catholic martyr on November 21, 1999.

== Biography ==
=== Pre-Asturias Life ===
Héctor Antonio Valdivielso Sáez was born to poor Spanish immigrants in October 1910 in Buenos Aires, Argentina. He was baptised in the church of Saint Nicholas-de-Bari and later immigrated to Briviesca, Spain in 1914.

He attended the municipal school and the Daughters of Charity of Saint Vincent de Paul in Paris, France. On August 31, 1922, he and his brother José entered the nearby house in Bujedo, a novitiate of De La Salle Brothers. With his parents' permission, he volunteered for the minor novitiate at the mission house in Lembecq-lez-Hall, Belgium. He thought that in this way he could soon go to his "homeland, Argentina," as he stated in a letter.

On October 6, 1926, he began to Novitiate and took on the name Benito de Jesus and pronounced his first vows to the De La Salle Brothers on October 7, 1927, and began to study to become a teacher, getting his first assignment on August 24, 1929, to a school in Astorga.

=== Death In Turón ===
In 1933, Benito de Jesus was sent to evangelise in the Mining Basins in Turón. However, due to the laws of the Second Spanish Republic, he had to pose as a lay teacher, officially and publicly.

On October 9, 1934, shortly after completing their annual spiritual exercises, Benito de Jesus was detained by revolutionary forces, along with Cirilo Bertrán, Marciano-José, Julian-Alfredo, Victoriano-Pio, Benjamin-Julian, Augusto-Andrés, Aniceto-Adolfo, and Father Inocencio de la Inmaculada Concepción, and summarily tried. They were found guilty and taken to a local cemetery and executed.

== Beatification and canonization ==
On April 29, 1990, Pope John Paul II beatified Benito de Jesus in St. Peter's Basilica in the Vatican City. Benito de Jesus was canonized as Argentina's first saint on November 21, 1999, with his feast day being on October 9.
