= Manuel Seco Gutiérrez =

Spanish Martyr (1912 – 1934)

Friar
- Born: October 4, 1912; Celada Marlantes, Cantabria, Spain
- Died: October 9, 1934 (aged 22); Turón, Asturias, Spain
- Honored in: Catholic Church
- Beatified: April 29, 1990
- Canonized: November 21, 1999 by Pope John Paul II

Manuel Seco Gutiérrez (October 4, 1912, Celada Marlantes – October 9, 1934 Turón) known as San Aniceto Adolfo, was one of the Martyrs of Turón, De La Salle Brothers murdered in 1934 during the religious persecution of the Revolution of Asturias in Spain. He was the youngest of the educators at the Nuestra Señora de Covadonga in Turón.

== Biography ==
Brother Aniceto-Adolfo was born in October 1912. His mother died soon after his birth, and his father provided his children with a Christian education. Three of his sons became Christian Brothers including Manuel who joined the juniorate at Bujedo when he was 12. On September 6, 1928, he entered the novitiate and took the habit of brotherhood. He completed his studies as educator at a training house run by the Christian Brothers of Bujedo in Burgos. Manuel Seco Gutiérrez made his first vows February 2, 1930 and took the name Brother Aniceto-Adolfo. In 1933 after receiving his teacher's diploma, he was appointed to the Institute of Our Lady at Valladolid to teach. He was assigned to the Colegio Nuestra Señora de Lourdes in Valladolid. After a year he was sent to Turon in the summer of 1934. There he met martyrdom at the age of 22.

== Canonization ==
He was beatified by Pope John Paul II on April 29, 1990, and canonized on November 21, 1999, along with the Passionist father Inocencio de la Inmaculada and his eight companions.

== See also ==
- Marciano José
- Martyrs of Turón
- Inocencio of Mary Immaculate
