= María Luisa García =

Spanish chef

- Born: 7 July 1919; Cabojal, Turón, Mieres, Asturias
- Died: 12 October 2019 (aged 100); Mieres, Asturias, Spain
- Occupations: Chef, Cookbook author

María Luisa García Sánchez (7 July 1919 – 12 October 2019) was a Spanish Asturian chef, cookbook author and leading expert on Asturian cuisine and the culinary traditions of Asturias. Her debut Asturian cookbook, El arte de cocinar (The Art of Cooking), first published in 1970, sold half a million copies and became ubiquitous in home kitchens throughout Asturias. It remains the best selling Asturian cookbook in history. She published a second part of her landmark cookbook, El arte de cocinar (parte 2) in 1982. Her other best known works include Platos típicos de Asturias (Typical Dishes of Asturias), released in 1971, and her collaboration with other chefs on El libro de oro de la cocina española (The Golden Book of Spanish Cuisine), an eight volume encyclopedia of Spanish cuisine.

== Biography ==
=== Early life ===
María Luisa García was born in Cauxal, Turón, a small parish in the municipality of Mieres, on 7 July 1919. Her mother, Leonor Sánchez, was a housewife who died when she was young, while her father, José Antonio García, was a worker at Fábrica de Mieres, a Spanish mining company. García was baptized in Figaredo parish in Mieres. She studied at the Colegio de las Dominicas and the Instituto de Mieres secondary school. Her early life was affected both by the death of her mother and the Spanish Civil War.

=== Career ===
Following the death of her mother, García spent years caring for her father and sisters. However, in 1957, when García was in her late 20s, she was awarded a scholarship to study at the Escuela de Especialidades Ruiz de Alda in Madrid. There, she studied the culinary arts, food art, pedagogy, dietetics, and other professional disciplines. In 1959, García returned to Mieres, where she embarked on a career as a culinary teacher and instructor. She initially began teaching at the Lloreo teleclub and La Peña in Mieres, but her classes soon expanded. By the mid-to-late 1960s, García was offering two-month long cooking courses, often taught to housewives, across Asturias.

Her colleagues and students encouraged her to compile and publish her first cookbook on Asturian cuisine, which was originally conceived as an additional textbook for her cooking classes. In 1970, García, who was 51-years old at the time, self-published her first Asturian cookbook, El arte de cocinar (The Art of Cooking). She sold the first copies at a small stand at the Gijón Trade Fair, which she used to publicize her recipes. The cookbook, which García also self-edited and distributed herself, went on to sell more than half a million copies since 1970 and remains the best-selling Asturian cookbook in history. El arte de cocinar is now in its 30th edition, as of 2019. The book became a staple in home kitchens throughout Asturias. According to Eduardo Méndez Riestra, the president of the Asturian Academy of Gastronomy, García was a popular wedding gift. In 1982, García released a second, follow-up volume of her cookbook, El arte de cocinar (parte 2).

García released another well known cookbook, Platos típicos de Asturias (Typical Dishes of Asturias), in 1971. She also collaborated with other Spanish chefs on El libro de oro de la cocina española (The Golden Book of Spanish Cuisine), an eight volume culinary encyclopedia. She never published a recipe without personally preparing it. An international edition of her recipes, The Good Cook, was released in North America by Time Life.

During the late 1970s, García married Manuel Fernández, a Fábrica de Mieres worker, in a wedding ceremony in Covadonga.

García prepared a meal for Pope John Paul II during the Pope's 1989 official visit to the Principality of Asturias at the request of the Archbishop of Oviedo Gabino Díaz Merchán. The dinner was held in Covadonga. Main regional dishes prepared by García for the Pope and other dignitaries included cider sausages, Cantabrian hake and Spanish omelettes. Beef for the other dishes was sourced from cows in Cangas de Onís. Other smaller, Asturian dishes and desserts served by García for the occasion included empanada de bonito, sea urchin caviar canapés, cream cheese, stewed beef, casadiellas, buñuelos, and cabrales cheese.

During the 1990s, she taught courses and workshops at Asturian cultural centers in Argentina, Belgium, Germany and Venezuela with the support of the autonomous government.

She received several cultural and culinary awards, including the Insignia de Oro de la Hostelería de Asturias (Golden Badge of Hospitality of Asturias) and the Grouse Award from the Asturian Center of Madrid.

María Luisa García died from complications of Alzheimer's disease at her home in Mieres, Asturias, on 12 October 2019, at the age of 100. Her funeral was held at San Pedro Apóstol parish in Mieres.
