= Inés Marful =

Spanish scholar and writer from Asturias (born 1961)

- Born: 1961 (age 64–65); Mieres, Spain
- Education: University of Oviedo (Ph.D)
- Occupations: Writer, visual artist
- Writing career
- Language: Spanish
- Genres: Literary theory, novels, poetry
- Subject: Federico García Lorca
- Notable works: Lorca y sus dobles; Historia teoria literaria vol. I; Cuatro Cuentos de Amor y El Intocable Absurdo
- Notable awards: Casino Mieres Novel Award

Inés Marful (born 1961), also known as Inés Marful Amor, is a Spanish scholar, writer, and visual artist from Asturias, known for her scholarly work about Federico García Lorca. Her novel Cuatro Cuentos de Amor y El Intocable Absurdo won the 2008 Casino Mieres Novel Award.

== Biography ==
Marful was born in 1961 in Mieres, Spain. She holds a doctorate in Spanish literature from the University of Oviedo, and has worked as a professor at the University of Oviedo and University of Valladolid. After 1999, Marful worked as a political counselor in the government of Spain and as a photojournalist and columnist.

=== Writing ===
Marful has written scholarly analyses of the works of Federico García Lorca, as well as several novels. Her work includes a critical essay titled "Passion and Death in Lorquian Drama" (Pasión y muerte en el drama lorquiano), published in the 1987 collection A Federico García Lorca. She is the author of Lorca y sus dobles (Lorca and his doubles), an essay described by Manuel Alvar in Blanco y Negro as "the definitive work on the poet from Granada".

Her novels include Te sucederá lo que al río en primavera (You will be as the river in springtime), published in 1998 and described as a "misiva de una mujer a su madre fallecida" ("letter from a woman to her deceased mother") by Ramón Massó Ortega in Historia Sinóptica de la Literatura Española. She also wrote Instrucciones para olvidar (Instructions to forget), published in 2008 and described as "una magnífica novela que huele a agua de lluvia y de mar" ("a magnificent novel that smells of rain and sea water") by María Castrejón in Que Me Estoy Muriendo De Agua: Guía de narrativa lésbica española.

Her 2008 novel Cuatro Cuentos de Amor y El Intocable Absurdo (Four tales of love and the untouchable absurd) won the 2008 Casino Mieres Novel Award. She is the third woman to win the prize since the awards were founded in 1980.

=== Visual art ===
Marful has worked with the Swiss photographer Su Alonso to create artwork as "Alonso y Marful." As of 2022, she is the director of Herrería de la Luna, a center for art and poetry, at the Free University of Boimouro.

== Selected publications ==
=== Literary theory ===
- Inés Marful (1990). "Apuntes para una psicocrítica del teatro loriquiano: de la obra juvenil a las farsas". In Marful, Inés (ed.). Lecturas del texto dramático: variaciones sobre la obra de Lorca. Oviedo: University de Oviedo. pp. 43–66. ISBN 9788474682694.
- Marful Amor, Inés (1991). Lorca y sus dobles: interpretación psicoanalítica de la obra dramática y dibujística. Kassel: Ed. Reichenberger [u.a.] ISBN 9783928064255.
- Bobes, C.; Baamonde, G.; Cueto, M.; Frechilla, E.; Marful, I. (1995). Historia teoria literaria vol. I: La Antigüedad Grecolatina (in Spanish). Madrid: Gredos. ISBN 978-84-249-1675-6.
- Inés Marful Amor (1999). "La autobiograpia imposible de Louis Althusser". In Tomás, Esteban Agulló; Fernández Alonso, Jose A.; Fernández de Valle, Jorge; García Alvarez, Ana I.; Grossi Queipo, Javier (eds.). Siglo XXI: problemas, perspectivas y desafíos. Oviedo: Universidad de Oviedo. pp. 241–254. ISBN 9788483171332.

=== Novels ===
- Marful Amor, Inés (1998). Te sucederá lo que al río en primavera. Oviedo: Ediciones Nobel. ISBN 9788489770416. (You will be as the river in springtime) - winner of the La Voz de Galicia Novel Award
- Marful Amor, Inés (2008). Instrucciones para olvidar. Barcelona: Editorial Egales. ISBN 978-84-88052-61-2. (Instructions to forget)
- Marful Amor, Inés (2008). Cuatro cuentos de amor y el intocable absurdo. Oviedo: KRK Ediciones. ISBN 9788483671276. (Four tales of love and the untouchable absurd) - winner of the Casino Mieres Novel Award
