= Marciano José =

Catholic saint and martyr (1900-1934)

Saint Marciano José FSC

Martyr of Turon
- Born: Filomeno López López; 15 November 1900; El Pedregal, Spain
- Died: 9 October 1934 (aged 33); Turón, Asturias, Spain
- Honored in: Catholic Church
- Beatified: 29 April 1990 by Pope John Paul II
- Canonized: 21 November 1999 by Pope John Paul II
- Feast: 9 October

Marciano José, FSC (born Filomeno López López, 15 November 1900 – 9 October 1934) was a religious of the De La Salle Brothers and one of the Martyrs of Turon. He was canonized by Pope John Paul II on 21 November 1999.

== Life ==
Lopez was born in El Pedregal in Guadalajara. When he was about twelve, he entered the juniorate of the Brothers of the Christian Schools. An infection cost him his hearing, so he returned home to tend sheep.

He returned, and became a novice in 1916. No longer preparing to be a teacher, he was put in charge of the clothes closet, cleaning of the church, cooking, and other manual work. He made his final profession in 1925, taking the name "Marciano José". He had a variety of assignments in communities in Santander, Valladolid, Vizcaya and Asturias. Marciano José was working in Mieres in 1934 when he volunteered to take the place of a brother who hesitated to go to Turon because of political and social tensions there.

He was killed in 1934 in the Asturian town of Turón during the Asturias revolt. At the time, religious education was suppressed, which forced the Brothers of La Salle to change their clothes and pose as peasants. Marciano José took the position of a cook at the School of Our Lady of Covadonga, since the position was abandoned by the previous cook due to the revolution.

When it was discovered that religion classes were still being taught at the school, on 5 October 1934, the mayor ordered the entire community to be imprisoned, including the Passionist priest Innocencio of Mary Immaculate who was with them. However, the cook was released for being mistaken as a simple employee. Marciano did not accept his release by clarifying that he was also a member of the school which led him to suffer torture and harassment along with all his classmates. On 9 October 1934, they were shot and buried in a common grave. His remains were transferred the following year to the novitiate in Bujedo.

In 1999 they were canonized by Pope John Paul II; their feast day is October 9.

== See also ==
- Martyrs of Turon
- List of Mexican saints
