= Marlantes =

Marlantes is a surname. Notable people with the surname include:

- Karl Marlantes (born 1944), American author and Vietnam War veteran
- Liz Marlantes (born 1975), American broadcast journalist

== See also ==
- Celada Marlantes, is a locality in the municipality of Campoo de Enmedio, in the northern Spanish autonomous community of Cantabria
