= Martyrs of Turón =

Eight executed Catholics

The Martyrs of Turón is the name given by the Catholic Church to a group of eight members of the De La Salle Brothers, a Catholic religious-teaching congregation, and one Passionist priest who were executed by insurrectionists in Turón in Asturias, Spain in October 1934. The Martyrs of Turón were killed by far-left rebels for their religious activities during the Asturian miners' strike of 1934 of the Revolution of 1934. They were canonized in 1999 by Pope John Paul II.

== Background ==
In 1934, the coal-mining town of Turón in Asturias was the centre of anti-government and anti-clerical hostility in the years prior to the outbreak of the Spanish Civil War. Eight members of the Institute of the Brothers of the Christian Schools (commonly known as De La Salle Brothers) were involved in an educational mission in Turón, living in a community there and teaching in the church school Nuestra Señora de Covadonga. The Second Spanish Republic was founded in 1931, and its constitution prohibited religious orders from engaging in education. The Brothers, however, were known to defy the ban on teaching religion and were openly escorting their students to Sunday Mass.

== Incident ==
In late September 1934, the Spanish political left were alarmed by the inclusion of the right-wing CEDA party in the Spanish government. A number of far-left organizations and their sympathizers began to prepare for revolution and the use of force to resist the government. Following the calling of a general strike, the miners of Asturias began to arm and organize themselves, occupying several towns and setting up "revolutionary committees." The Brothers' school was an irritant to the insurrectionists in charge of operations in Turón because of the religious influence it ostensibly exerted on the young. Additionally, their school was supported by Altos Hornos de Vizcaya, the company that owned the mines in Turón. On Friday 5 October 1934, they forced their way into the school on the pretext of inspecting whether arms had been hidden inside. They arrested all the Brothers present, as well as a Passionist priest who was visiting to hear confessions. During the next three days, they were held in the "People's House" and tried by a revolutionary tribunal. After refusing a final offer to join the rebels, they were ultimately sentenced to death for illegal religious activities. On 9 October 1934, in the early hours of the morning, they were taken to a local cemetery, where they were unceremoniously executed and then buried in a common grave.

The miners' revolt in Asturias collapsed shortly after the event, defeated by government troops, with over 3,000 miners killed in the process. Francisco Franco was one of the Generals involved in the fighting the rebellion, and he would himself rebel against the government two years later.

== Canonization ==
The nine martyrs of Turon were venerated on 7 September 1989, and beatified By Pope John Paul II on 29 April 1990. They were canonized on 21 November 1999. Their memorial day is 9 October.

The nine are regarded by the Catholic Church as Martyrs of the Spanish Civil War. Although their deaths occurred two years prior to the outbreak of the war, it was part and parcel of the communal violence that was a feature of the conflict, and the times before and after. Of the 6,000 religious persons killed during the Spanish Civil War about one thousand have had their causes advanced for beatification, though the Martyrs of Turón were the first to be canonized.

The cause for the Martyrs of Turón has been linked to that of Jaime Hilario Barbal, who was tried, convicted, and executed in 1937 for being a member of the De La Salle Brothers and was canonized by the Catholic Church on the same day as the nine from Turón.

== List ==
The Martyrs of Turon were:

- Brother Cirilo Bertrán, director of the community of Turón, born José Sanz Tejedor on 20 March 1888 at Lerma, Burgos.
- Brother Marciano-José, born Filomeno López López on 17 November 1900 at El Pedregal (Guadalajara).
- Brother Julian-Alfredo, born Vilfrido Fernández Zapico on 24 December 1903 at Cifuentes de Rueda, León.
- Brother Victoriano-Pio, born Claudio Bernabé Cano on 7 July 1905 at San Millán de Lara, Burgos.
- Brother Benjamin-Julian, born Vicente Alonso Andrés on 7 October 1908 at Jaramillo de la Fuente, Burgos.
- Brother Benito de Jesús, born Héctor Valdivielso Sáez on 31 October 1910 in Buenos Aires, Argentina, the first Argentine saint.
- Brother Augusto-Andrés, born Román Martínez Fernández on 9 May 1910 in Santander
- Brother Aniceto-Adolfo, at twenty years old, the youngest Brother of the community, born Manuel Seco Gutiérrez in October 1912 at Celada Marlantes, Santander. He was the youngest of the educators at the Nuestra Señora de Covadonga.
- Father Inocencio de la Inmaculada Concepción, Passionist Father who had come to hear confessions, born Manuel Canoura Arnau on 10 March 1887 at S. Cecilia del Valle de Oro, near the Cantabrian coast in the province of Lugo, Galicia.

== See also ==
- Martyrs of the Spanish Civil War
- Red Terror (Spain)

== Sources ==
- Vatican report on canonization
- Nine martyrs at SQPN.com
