= Uxo =

- Parish

- Location within Spain
- Coordinates: 43.2°N 5.783333°W
- Country: Spain
- Autonomous community: Asturias
- Province: Asturias
- Municipality: Mieres

Population (2013)
  - Total: 2,183

Uxo (Spanish: Ujo) is one of 15 parishes (administrative divisions) in Mieres, a municipality within the province and autonomous community of Asturias, in northern Spain.

== Description ==
It is divided into two zones, physically separated by the Renfe railway.

It has a population of approximately 1920, which has been progressively decreasing because of the decrease in the coal mining activity, which was of great importance in the region until the late 20th century. Some of its most important neighborhoods are La Vega, San José, Santa Olaya, Cortina and La Estación.

Its most important buildings are the Santa Eulalia church, built in the 12th century and declared Bien de interés cultural.Also noteworthy are the workers' and senior managers' houses derived from mining activity, with numerous examples remaining from the 19th and 20th centuries. Uxo was also an important railway junction as it had a large locomotive workshop, now abandoned, built in 1924 and which included numerous homes for railway workers in its towers.

Its local holiday is on May 1st, Saint Joseph the worker.

It is communicated by the A-66 motorway, the N-630, MI-1, AS-112, AS-242, FEVE and RENFE railways. It is located 5 km from the town of Mieres, 21 from Oviedo and 38 from Gijón.

== Etymology ==
Its name is derived from the vulgar Latin word ustium, meaning entrance or exit. The meaning adequates with its toponomy, as Uxo is a natural entrance to river Caudal. The Roman origin of its name makes it clear that it was once a Roman settlement, or at least one with enough Roman influence to have adopted this name.

== List of towns and villages ==
- Barreo
- El Barrio la Estación
- Casares
- Conforcos
- Cortina
- L'Envaralao
- El Pedriscu
- El Puntarrión
- El Rebullu
- La Reigosa
- El Ribayón
- Sanriella
- El Siirru
- Los Tapios
- La Teyera
- Uriendes
- La Urdiera
- Villar
- Les Viñes
- Vistalegre
- Ricastro
- Uxo
