= Lloreo =

- Parish

- Location within Spain
- Coordinates: 43°16′13″N 5°49′55″W
- Country: Spain
- Autonomous community: Asturias
- Province: Asturias
- Municipality: Mieres

Lloreo is one of 15 parishes (administrative divisions) in Mieres, a municipality within the province and autonomous community of Asturias, in northern Spain.

== Villages ==
- Ablaña Baxo
- Ablaña Riba
- Bulloso
- El Barrio Pachón
- El Costón
- El Curión
- El Períu
- El Vallín
- Encimalavilla
- La Falcuedro
- La Fenosa
- La Llerosa de Baxo
- La Llerosa de Riba
- La Llosa Alfonso
- La Paraxa
- La Perea
- La Rociella
- La Roza
- La Vega San Pedro
- Les Cases del Molín
- Les Cuestes
- Les Quintanes
- Llames
- Llaviaes
- Lloreo
- Nicolasa
- Los Pareones
- Samartiniego
- Tablao
- Yaneces
