= La Rebollá =

- Parish

- Location within Spain
- Country: Spain
- Autonomous community: Asturias
- Province: Asturias
- Municipality: Mieres

La Rebollá is one of 15 parishes (administrative divisions) in Mieres, a municipality within the province and autonomous community of Asturias, in northern Spain.

== Villages ==
- Aguilar
- Copián
- El Carrilón
- El Colláu
- El Correor
- El Prau'l Conde
- El Rollu
- La Caleya
- La Escombrera
- La Malatería
- La Peralea
- La Piperona
- La Rebollá
- Les Pieces
- Los Tendeyones
- Repitaneo
- Santa Llucía
