= Cuna (Mieres) =

- Parish

- Location within Spain
- Country: Spain
- Autonomous community: Asturias
- Province: Asturias
- Municipality: Mieres

Cuna is one of 15 parishes (administrative divisions) in Mieres, a municipality within the province and autonomous community of Asturias, in northern Spain.

== Villages ==
- Casaviedra
- Cuna
- El Coxal
- El Ḷḷerón
- El Pedroso
- El Praón
- El Vaḷḷitu/El Valletu
- Insierto
- La Caseta
- La Tazá
- La Viña
- Paxío
- Sobrobio
- Valcenera
- Viade
- Viesca
- Viḷḷamartín
- Xinales
