= Urbiés =

- Parish

- Location within Spain
- Country: Spain
- Autonomous community: Asturias
- Province: Asturias
- Municipality: Mieres

Urbiés is one of 15 parishes (administrative divisions) in Mieres, a municipality within the province and autonomous community of Asturias, in northern Spain.

The village, with an agricultural tradition, once had more than 40 hórreos. The rest of the parish is home to a series of dispersed centers with an equally traditional economy. Contrasting with them is the neighborhood of San Luis, built as a housing area for workers in the mid-20th century, in the final part of the Turón plain. The parish church of Urbiés dates back to 1970 and is dedicated to Saint Mary. Urbiés was segregated from the parish of San Martín de Turón in 1885.

== Etymology ==
There are two theories that explain the origin of the toponym. The first says that it comes from a pre-Roman hydronymic root ur meaning "water" and a suffix -be, meaning "below", which would correspond to the situation of Urbiés below the source of the waters of the Turón River. The second says that it comes from a pre-Roman oronymic root or, which means "summit" and the aforementioned suffix -be, which would also coincide with the position of Urbiés below the highest peaks of the valley.

== Villages ==
- Buyalbendi
- El Caburnu
- El Cantiquín
- El Coḷḷéu
- El Corraldusu
- El Dochal
- El Palacio
- El Paraor
- El Pidriru
- El Pindal
- El Quentu
- El Quentu la Frecha
- El Quentu los Ríos
- El Ḷḷeu
- El Ricuncu
- El Subiúriu
- El Suquitu
- El Yenu Peral
- El Yenu la Reguera
- La Campa les Treches
- La Casa'l Quentu
- La Coḷḷadieḷḷa
- La Escosura
- La Faucosa
- La Fayaverde
- La Grande
- La Ḷḷomba
- La Ḷḷáscara
- La Molinera
- La Peruyal
- La Teyera
- La Valdriana
- La Vaḷḷicuerra
- La Vega Ría
- La Vegona
- La Xamonda
- La Yana'l Pumar
- Les Argayaes
- Les Matieḷḷes
- Les Porqueres
- Santolaya
- Urbiés
