= Santa Rosa (Mieres) =

Parish in Mieres, Asturias, Spain

- Parish

- Location within Spain
- Coordinates: 43.266667°N 5.716667°W
- Country: Spain
- Autonomous community: Asturias
- Province: Asturias
- Municipality: Mieres

Population
  - Total: 1,979

Santa Rosa is one of 15 parishes (administrative divisions) in Mieres, a municipality within the province and autonomous community of Asturias, in northern Spain.

== Villages ==
- Agradiellos
- Baltesara
- Carrespientes
- Cutuperal
- El Barrio Solano
- El Cabanín
- El Campizu
- El Cantiquín
- El Carbayón
- El Cau
- El Colléu
- El Cruce
- El Fresneal
- El Peñón
- El Prurriúndu
- El Quempu
- El Quentu
- El Rebullu
- El Sordán
- El Vescón
- Entelosríos
- L'Acibíu
- L'Acíu
- La Cantera
- La Carba
- La Casacima
- La Casería
- La Corranuxa
- La Envernal
- La Felguera
- La Insierta
- La Llavaera
- La Llonga
- La Mozquita
- La Segá
- La Xagosa
- La Yana les Duernes
- Los Nadales
- Los Pontones
- Los Quintanales
- Los Torneros
- Piedrafita
- Planta
- Polio
- Quentuserrón
- Respines
- Returbiu
- Santa Rosa
- Santu Miano
- Vegaotos
