= Gijón Polytechnic School of Engineering =

Coordinates: 43°31′24″N 5°37′34″W

- Escuela Politécnica de Ingeniería de Gijón Escuela Politéunica d'Inxeniería de Xixón
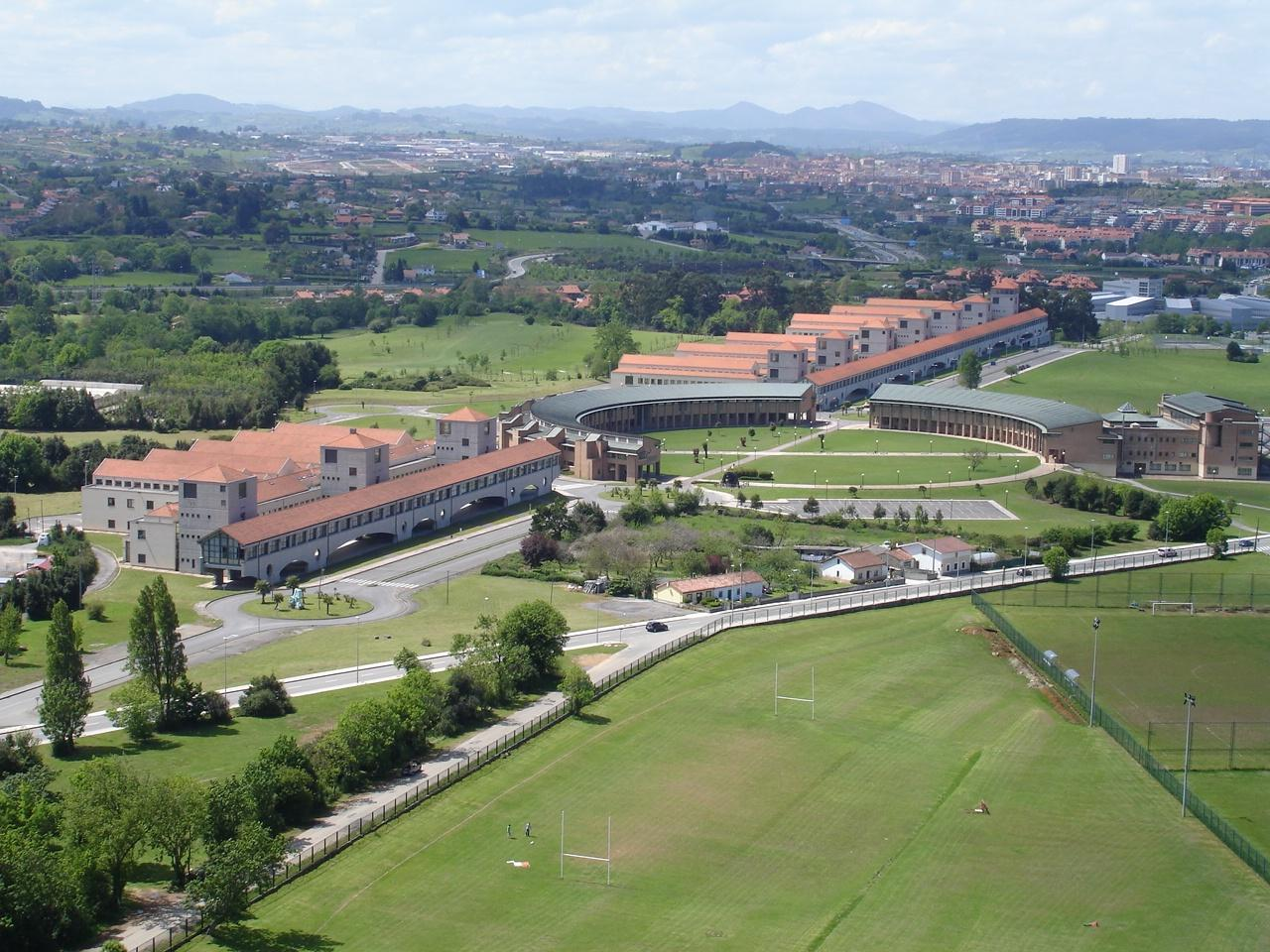
- Type: Public
- Established: 1888
- Parent institution: University of Oviedo
- Director: Juan Carlos Campo Rodríguez
- Students: 4.769
- Location: Gijón, Asturias, Spain
- Website: www.epigijon.uniovi.es

Gijón Polytechnic School of Engineering (Spanish: Escuela Politécnica de Ingeniería de Gijón; Asturian: Escuela Politéunica d'Inxeniería de Xixón), is one of the schools and faculties of the University of Oviedo. The school is located in Gijón, Asturias (Spain).

In the academic year 2011-12 the school had 4,769 students enrolled, being the educational center of the University of Oviedo with more students.

== History ==
The Gijón Polytechnic School of Engineering is the center formed by the merger of the School of Industrial Engineering of Gijón with the School of Engineering Technical Informatics and Telematics of Gijon and Polytechnic School of Engineering of Gijón, held in 2010.

=== University School of Industrial Engineering of Gijón ===
The January 20 of 1888 Gijón opens in a school district of the Central School of Arts and Crafts in Madrid, installed in the street Institute, in the building that later would become headquarters Spain bank branch in Gijon. Would this School of Arts and Crafts in Gijon which by decree 1377/1972 of 10 May should become School of Engineering of Gijón integrated into the University of Oviedo. Previously, the August 17 of 1901 had taken the name of School of Industries. The December 16 of 1910 was renamed Industrial School . In 1929 returns to rename Higher School of Work in 1942 and School of Industrial Experts.

By Royal Decree 1457/1991 of 27 September, the School of Industrial Engineering of the Center of Integrated Teaching of Gijon joined the College of Engineering Technique Gijón .

=== Technical School of Computer Engineering and Telematics Gijon ===
The E.U. Gijon Computing was created in 1982. Its first steps run from the hand of Department of Trade, Tourism and Social Sciences Jovellanos | EU Business Studies "Jovellanos" Gijon with which it shares government bodies, facilities and personnel. The degree offered by the E.U. Informatics is the Diploma in Computer Science, in its two specialties: Management and Systems.

In 1990 the separation of the two centers occurs, the EU transladándose Computing the new campus, sharing facilities ETS Industrial Engineering and the facilities and personnel administration and services ES Civil Navy.

A Council of Universities, dated July 20, 1992 changed its name to EUIT Computer Gijon.

During 1992 to 1993 it enters into force a new curriculum and begin to be taught degrees of Technical Engineer in Computer Management and Technical Engineering in Computer Systems. In 1994-95 new facilities Aulario Viesques Campus, where the Centre's management is definitely located, the Library Administrative Services and the Student are inaugurated.

During the academic year 2000-01 are effective current curricula of computer degrees and in the 2002-2003 plan corresponding to the degree of Engineer of Telecommunications, specializing in Telematics studies.

=== Polytechnic School of Engineering of Gijón ===
The Polytechnic School of Engineering of Gijón born as School of Industrial Engineering of Gijón by agreement of Government of Spain was April 18 of 1975 ( Decree 1434/1975 of June 19 - Official State Gazette of July 1). The first academic year began in 1978, and classrooms of the School of Industrial Engineering of Gijón were used. It was not until 1983 when the new school building was inaugurated.

A new change of name to Higher Technical School of Industrial Engineers and Computer Engineers of Gijon by Royal Decree 1457/1991 (BOE of October 12 of 1991, Art. 6 was carried out, Item 3), when the new Engineering degree in Computer Science was authorized.

The Official Gazette of the Principality of Asturias of October 8 of 2002 published Decree 121/2002 by which we proceeded to a new change of name to the Higher Polytechnic School of Engineering Gijon after having begun to teach the new Telecommunications Engineering last year.

=== Students enrolled 2015-2016 ===
- Industrial Chemical Engineering: 45 students
- Industrial Technology Engineering: 103 students
- Mechanical Engineering: 201 students
- Electrical Engineering: 60 students
- Automation and Industrial Electronics Engineering: 98 students
- Computer Engineering in Information Technology: 56 students
- Engineering Technologies and Telecommunication Services: 94 students

== Degrees ==
Degrees offered at Gijón Polytechnic School of Engineering are adjusted to the European Higher Education Area (EHEA).

- Undergraduate programs:
  - Bachelor of electrical engineering
  - Bachelor of industrial technology
  - Bachelor of mechanical engineering
  - Bachelor of chemical and process engineering
  - Bachelor of electronic engineering and automation
  - Bachelor of computer engineering in information and communications technology
  - Bachelor in information and communications technology and telecommunications engineering
- Graduate programs:
  - Master of Mechanics, Design, Construction and Manufacturing
  - Erasmus Mundus Master of Energy Engineering
  - Erasmus Mundus Master of Mechatronics
  - Master of Computer Systems and services for Internet
  - Master of Mobile Nets Technology

== International Programs ==
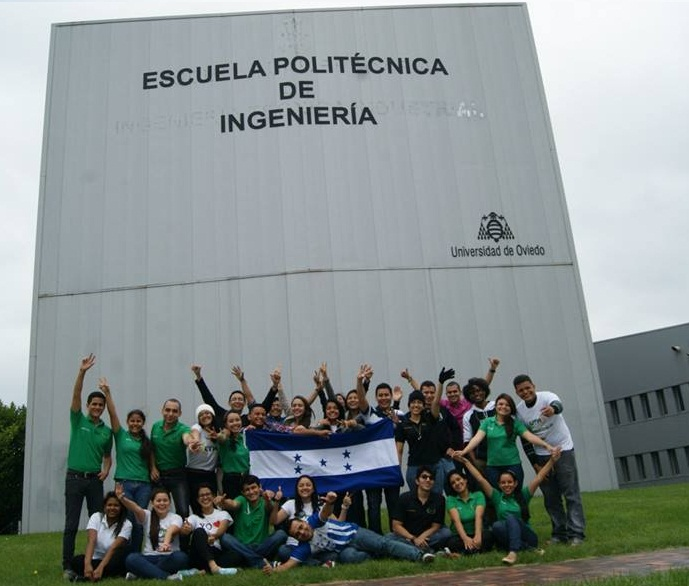
Erasmus students in 2015-2016

The University of Oviedo and Gijón EPI offer multiple mobility options for students of official studies (Grade, 1st or 2nd Cycle, Official Masters or Ph.D.) who wish to have an experience off campus and also receives a lot of students from around the world.

Among the programs to which affiliates are located they are:

- The scholarships Erasmus
- ERASMUS practices
- Cooperation Agreements
- SICUE Program.

== Wikipedia in the EPI ==
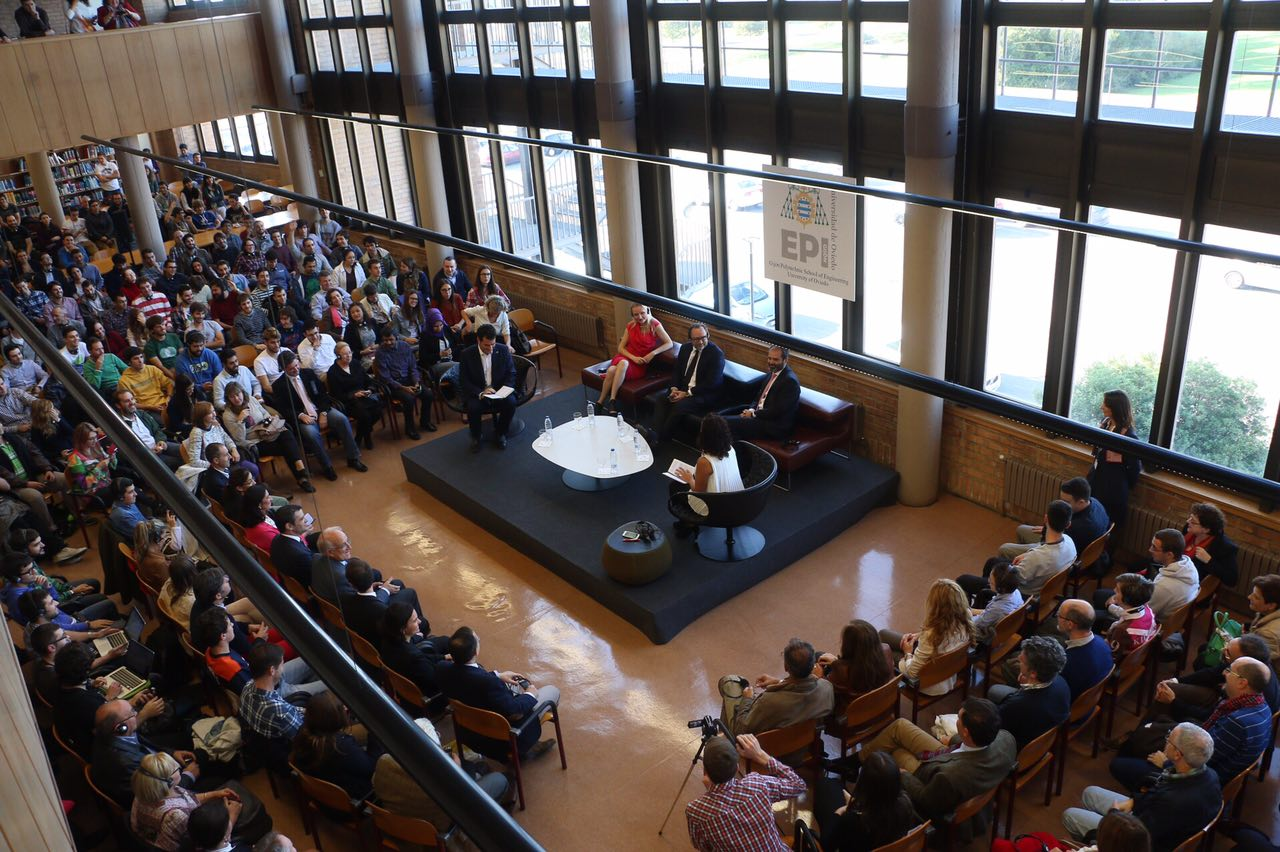
Jimmy Wales in the library lecture hall north of the EPI Gijón

Thursday October 22, 2015, at 17:00, was held in the Library of North Aulario a round table with the participation of Wikipedia, Princess of Asturias Award for International Cooperation. The conversation focused on digital and social entrepreneurs, based on the history of Wikipedia. Jimmy Wales stepped in, Patricio Lorente and Lila Tretikov Wikimedia Foundation, the event was moderated by Marian Garcia and Ramon Rubio, teachers Gijón Polytechnic School of Engineering.
