= Santa Cruz (Mieres) =

- Parish

- Location within Spain
- Country: Spain
- Autonomous community: Asturias
- Province: Asturias
- Municipality: Mieres

Santa Cruz is one of 15 parishes (administrative divisions) in Mieres, a municipality within the province and autonomous community of Asturias, in northern Spain.

The area has a population of 877 inhabitants as of April 2017, among them 203 residents belong to the village of Santa Cruz.

== Villages ==
- Bustiello
- Canto la Vallina
- Collanzo
- Cruz de los Caminos
- El Pedroso
- El Prestamo
- Forniellos
- Fresnedo
- Gramedo
- Grillero
- La Alameda
- La Barraca
- La Casona
- La Collada
- La Corraina
- La Florida
- La Fontona
- La Forcada
- La Llama
- La Llinar
- La Pomar
- Las Llanas
- Los Cubiellos
- Los Figares
- Los Tableros
- Oriella
- Puente Vieja
- Revallines
- San Salvador
- Santa Bárbara
- Sovilla
- Taruelo
- Valdeciego
- Valdeoreyo
- Valdesenche
- Virgen de la Luz
- Vista Alegre
- Vista Hermosa

== History ==
In August 2022, the electric supply in the area was improved with the building of two electric substations.
