= José Barluenga =

Spanish chemist

José Joaquín Barluenga Mur (27 July 1940 – 7 September 2016) was a Spanish chemist known for his research in organometallic chemistry. He was a professor of chemistry at Oviedo University until his retirement in 2014.

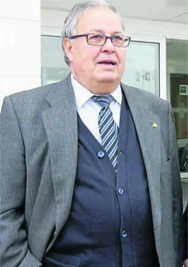
José Barluenga

== Early life and education ==
Barluenga was born in Tardienta (Huesca), Spain, where he spent his childhood and attended primary school. He studied chemistry at the University of Zaragoza (B.Sc., 1963; Ph.D. 1966) with Professor V. Gómez Aranda. In 1967, he moved to Germany and, after a postdoctoral appointment at the Max-Planck Institut für Kohlenforschung in Mülheim an der Ruhr (1967–1970, Professor H. Hoberg), he returned to Spain to hold research positions at the Spanish Council for Scientific Research in Zaragoza (1970–1972) and University of Zaragoza (1972–1975).

== Career ==
He joined the faculty of University of Oviedo as Professor of Chemistry in 1975 and became emeritus Professor in 2010 after 35 years of service at the university.

He has supervised 120 Ph.D. students of whom 18 have hold positions as Professors of Chemistry at different Spanish universities. His laboratory has been active in the field of organic chemistry with research interests in synthetic methodology development of transition-metal reagents, stoichiometric and catalytic processes.

He discovered the bis(pyridine)iodonium tetrafluoroborate (IPy_{2}BF_{4}), an iodinating reagent now named after him which is available from numerous chemical suppliers worldwide. One of his papers on the use of the reagent is his most cited article, with 223 citations through September 2014 according to Google Scholar. Other papers of his on this topic have had as many as 170 and 172 citations.

== Awards ==
- Research award of the Alexander von Humboldt Foundation (Germany, 1989).
- 1st Dupont Award (Spain, 1990).
- Iberdrola Award for Science and Technology (Spain, 1996).
- 1st Gold Medal from the Spanish Society of Chemistry (1999).
- 1st National Award of Chemical Science and Technology "Enrique Moles" (Spain, 2001).
- Fundación García-Cabrerizo Award (Spain, 2002).
- Hermanos Elhuyar-Hans Goldschmidt Award (Germany-Spain, 2005).
- Rey Jaime I de Investigación Award (Spain, 2005).
- Silver Medal of Principado de Asturias (Spain, 2009).
