= Carmina Virgili =

Spanish geologist (1927–2014)

- in 2013
- Born: 19 June 1927; Barcelona
- Died: 21 November 2014 (aged 87); Barcelona

Professor Carmina Virgili or Carmina Virgili i Rodon (19 June 1927 – 21 November 2014) was a Spanish professor in geology and a politician.

== Life ==
Virgili was born in Barcelona on 19 June 1927. She was the youngest of two children born to Guillem Virgili and Carme Rodón Pelegri. Her mother was a pharmacist who sometimes taught in the school of agriculture. During the Spanish Civil War, they lived in the province of Barcelona in the town of Igualada.

Virgil entered the University of Barcelona where she took the geographer Salvador Llovet as a mentor. She was a keen student who had the active support of her family. After gaining an honours degree in Natural Science in 1949 she went into teaching at schools in the area of the Catalan county of Vallès. Whilst she was teaching she co-authored an introductory textbook for the natural sciences. This book was successful and ran to many editions.

In August 1953 Barcelona university created a degree in Geology which they separated from the subject of Natural Sciences. Virgili joined the new department.

She gained a doctorate in geology in 1956 at the University of Barcelona. In 1963 she became the first woman professor at the University of Oviedo. She was the third woman to become a professor in Spain. She was the first Dean in 1977.

From 1982 to 1985 she was Junior Minister for Universities and Research. From 1996 to 2000 she was a Socialists' Party of Catalonia senator active in commissions on euthanasia, risk assessment or Iberoamerican relationships.

In 2008 she was awarded an honorary doctorate from the University of Genoa. She wrote over 100 publications and she received numerous honours including a Gold Medal from the University of Barcelona in 2011 and emeritus professorship at the Universidad Complutense.

Virgili died in Barcelona on 21 November 2014. She died single, without children, and left her body to science.
