= José Manuel Castañón =

Spanish writer (1920–2001)

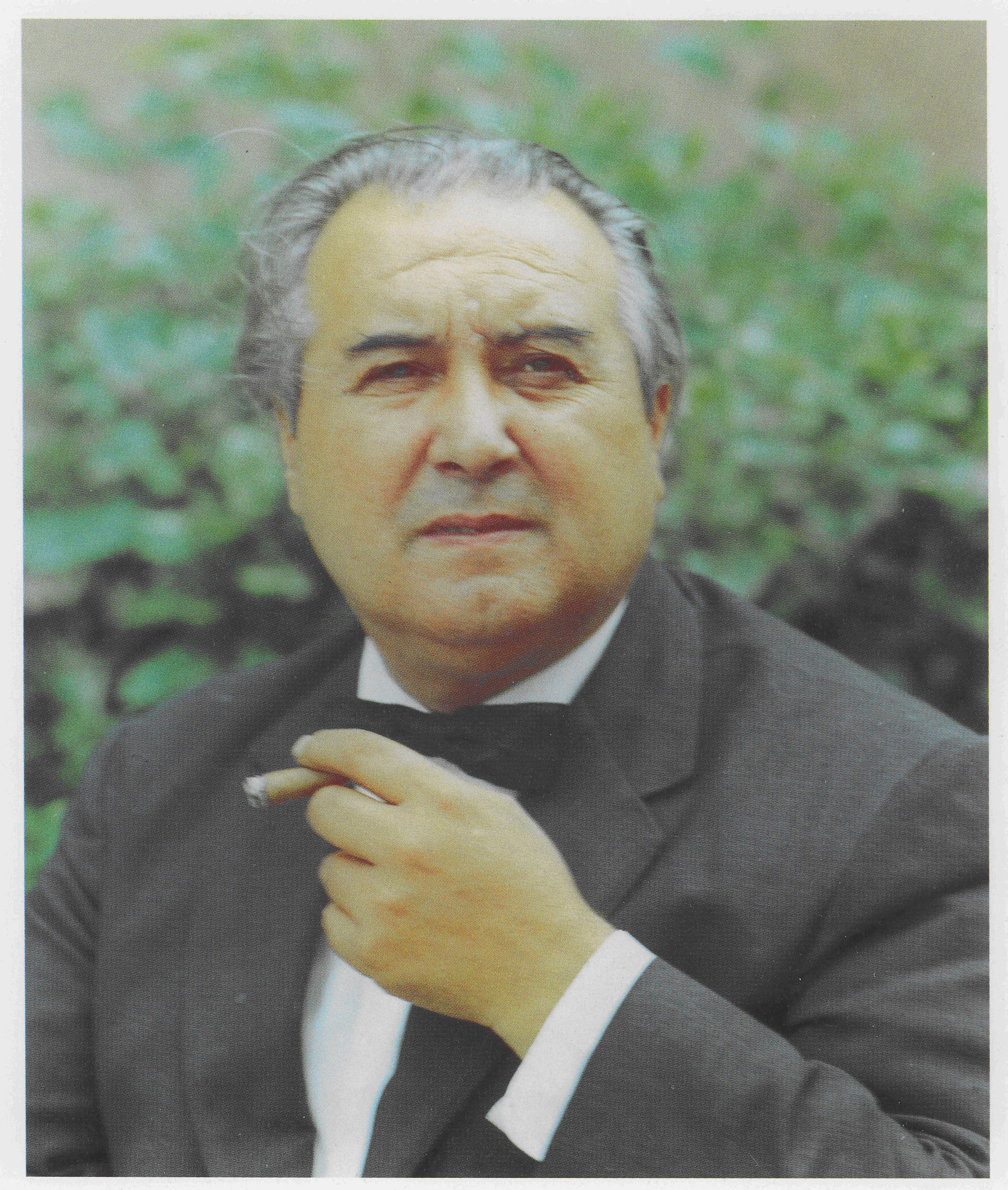
- Born: 10 February 1920; Pola de Lena, Asturias, Spain
- Died: 6 June 2001 (aged 81); Madrid, Spain
- Occupations: Writer, lawyer
- Spouse: Maria de las Nieves Castañón Escalada

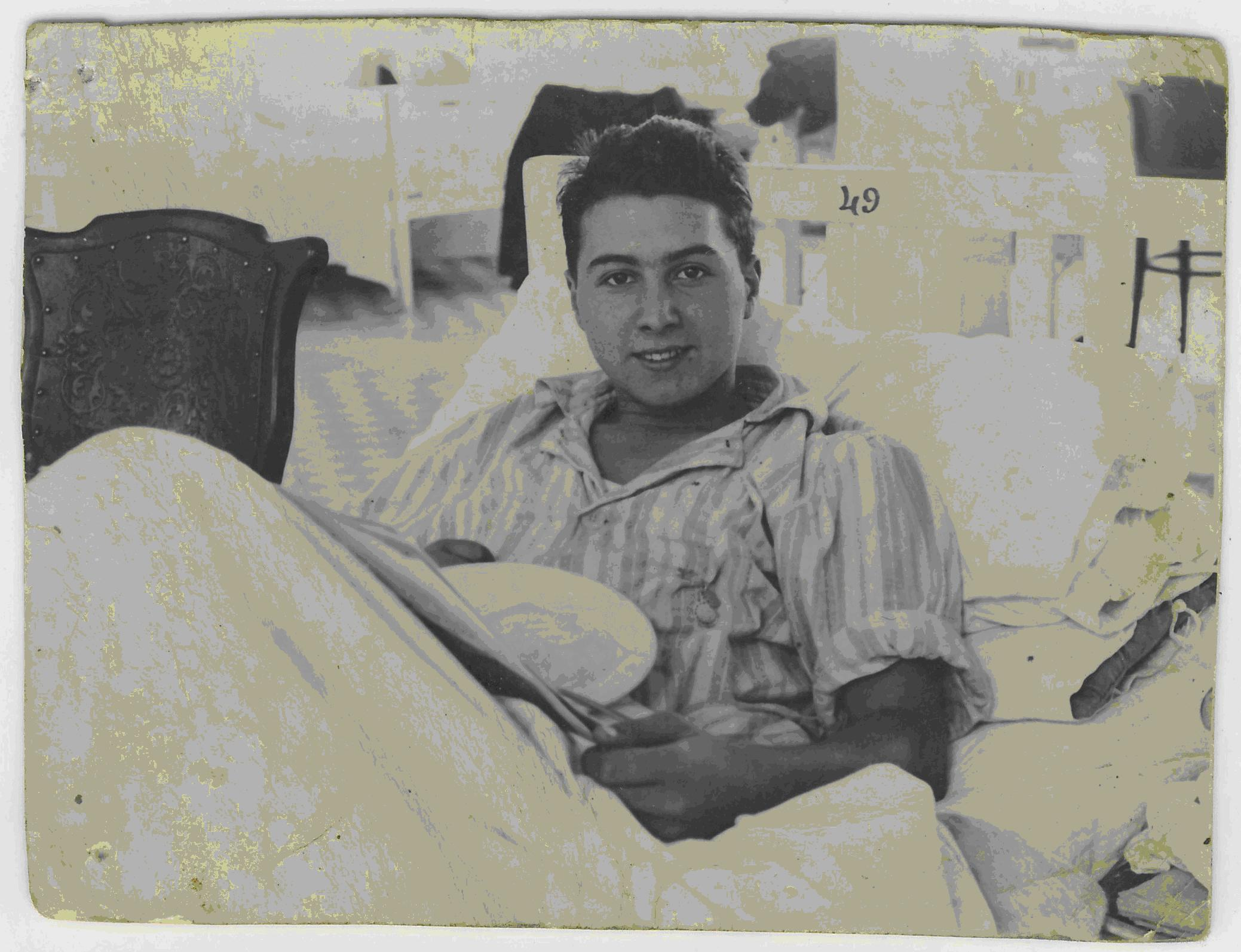
Galicia, October 1937, At the hospital.

José Manuel Castañón (10 February 1920 – 6 June 2001) was a Spanish writer born in Pola de Lena, Asturias. Although he fought in Francisco Franco’s 1936 military uprising, he later distanced himself from Franco's regime and in 1957 left for a 20-year exile to Venezuela. His best-known novel Moletu-Voleva, published in Madrid in 1956, a story about lust for money.

== Biography ==
José Manuel Castañón was born in Pola De Lena, Asturias. He was the third of seven children of Guillermo Castañón, a lawyer, and Berta de la Peña. He was very much influenced by his father. He had a happy childhood life, liked to read books in his father’s library, and at a very young age began to feel the calling to be a writer.

At the outbreak of the Spanish Civil War, he left secretly his parents' home, and enlisted himself in the Infantry. He was severely injured (he lost the use of his right hand) but Castañón still had the strength to return to the front. He was promoted to the rank of lieutenant and in 1941 volunteered in the Blue Division. He returned to conclude his studies and became a lawyer like his father. In 1942 he married his first-cousin Nieves Escalada; they had five children. In 1945 he graduated from Law School at the University of Oviedo. Castañón worked as a lawyer in private practice for some years in Oviedo. Unwilling to be part of the Franco’s regime due to the unfair treatment of defeated Republicans and to discriminatory legal procedures, he started expressing his discontent. He protested openly against the dictatorship, calling for a just treatment to family members of Republicans killed in the war and to War Disable Republican fighters and their families. As a result he was imprisoned, in 1953.

In prison he wrote his first novel Moletu-Voleva or "The insanity for the lust of dollars", a tragic-comic satire, inspired by the personality of one of the jail recluses and his mad pursuit for easy-coming money. The book, published in 1956, received very warm critics and it was considered full of originality and transcendence. In 1957 he also published Bezana Roja.

By that time, he had already decided going into self-exile, considering incompatible his profession as a freelance writer with Franco's dictatorship. In 1957, he resigned his infantry captain rank and addressed a letter to the Spanish Government requesting that his War Veteran's pension be paid to a War Disable Republican, and fled to France. From there he went to Caracas, Venezuela. Two years later his family joined him. In Venezuela he sustained his family working exclusively as a writer. Most of his literary work was published in Caracas. In 1987 he received the Order of Andrés Bello from the Government of Venezuela.

José Manuel Castañón was a passionate lover of poetry. He had an astounding ability to memorizing poems; he knew an extraordinary number of poems by heart, and enjoyed reciting them to audiences. He wrote a book about his beloved Peruvian poet Cesar Vallejo: Passion for Vallejo. In 1983, he was named adoptive son of Santiago de Chuco, Vallejo's birthplace.

While in the Blue Division he had kept a diary, which remained unpublished for many years. The book was published in 1991 under the title The Diary of an Adventure. He wrote, as well, books on his ideology, political beliefs, and his inner struggle. In 1977, he returned to Madrid, when in Spain had already disappeared all vestige of the dictatorship. He died on 6 June 2001.

Castañón was predeceased by his wife and a son, and is survived by four daughters.

== Major works ==
- Moletu-Voleva (1956)
- Bezana Roja (1957)
- Andres Cuenta su Historia (1962)
- Encuentro con Venezuela (1962)
- Confesiones de un vivir absurdo (1959)
- Una Balandra encalla en Tierra firme (1958)
- Cuba hablo contigo (1989)
- Cuba sigo Hablando contigo(1993)
- Pasion por Vallejo (1963)
- Entre dos Orillas (1975)
- Me Confieso Bolivarianamente (1982)
- Cuentos Vividos (1976)
- Diario de una Aventura (1991)
- En mi sentir revuelto (1992)
- Mi Padre y Ramon Gomez de la Serna (1975)
