= La Peña (Mieres) =

- Parish

- Location within Spain
- Country: Spain
- Autonomous community: Asturias
- Province: Asturias
- Municipality: Mieres

La Peña is one of 15 parishes (administrative divisions) in Mieres, a municipality within the province and autonomous community of Asturias, in northern Spain.

== Villages ==
- Arroxo
- Cimielles
- Cutiellos
- El Barrio
- El Breu
- El Cabanín
- El Cañu
- El Praón
- El Ruciu
- El Tarronal
- Escalá
- Espeñaperros
- L'Arzolá
- La Canterona
- La Carba
- La Carba d'Arroxo
- La Caseta
- La Corra'l Quentu
- La Festal
- La Funtiquina
- La Nozal
- La Peña
- La Pría
- La Rampla
- La Teyera
- La Vara
- Les Cases d'Alperi
- Les Cruces
- Les Escueles
- Les Llaviaes
- Rozaes de la Peña
- San Tiso
- Santana
- Xuancabritu
