= Ignacio Martinez Suarez =

Spanish photographer

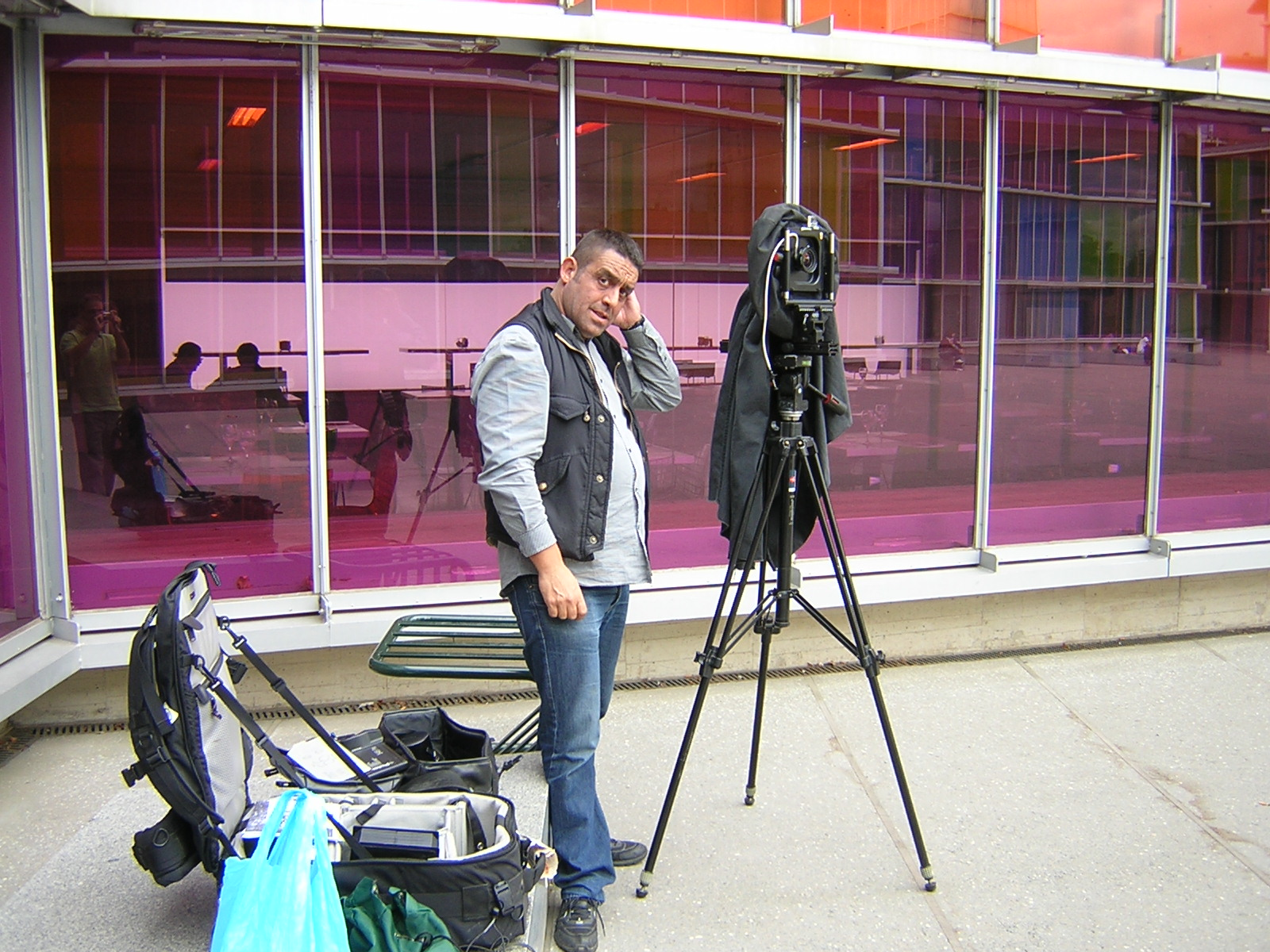
José Ignacio Martínez Suárez

José Ignacio Martínez (born 1963) is a photographer from Navia, Asturias, Spain who is specialized in architecture photography. Since he was a child Martínez was connected to photography through his contact with amateur and professional photographers, including his father, Jesús Martínez, a doctor, historian and photographer. (Gea, J.C., Donde habita la belleza, La Nueva España, 12 de julio de 2009, retrieved 19 December 2016). These experiences allowed him to learn how to handle various manual cameras, like the mythical Nikon F, and learned the use and tricks of the dark room, the enlarger, the chemical used in processing and other methods used on that time.

Martínez studied in the Complutense University of Madrid where he earned a bachelor's degree in Communication Studies, with a major in Audiovisual Communication, in 1989.

From 1995 through 2005, Martínez lived in Lustenau, in the region of Vorarlberg, Austria where he developed his specialization on architecture.

== Early work ==
Since 1982 Martínez worked as a press and publishers photographer. After his bachelor's degree studies, he studied in the Madrid “Flash” Technical School of Photography, Video and Television (Escuela Técnica de Fotografía, Vídeo y Televisión “Flash” de Madrid), in the University of Oviedo, and in the City of Dornbirn Museum in Austria.

== Professional career ==
Since 1995 Martínez has worked as an architectural photographer with important influences in Austria, Germany, Switzerland, Liechtenstein, Italy and Spain, where he was hired by architects, institutions, publishers and museums.

Martínez lived in the region of Vorarlberg, Austria which is characterized by its architecture, especially the natural landscape combined with construction which are ecologically sustainable. (Contal, Marie-Helen and Revedin, Jana, Sustainable Design, Towards a new ethic in architecture and town planning, Birkhauser, Basel, 2009, p. 62) Following that same characteristics, his photography does not have a traditional perspective, but it is “often mysterious and poetic, more than the pure description of the building”. ( Vorarlberg Nachrichten, 15–16 September 2012. P. 16) The renowned Austrian architectural photographer, Margherita Spiluttini, affirmed that Martínez is “undoubtedly one of the most important architectural photographers in Europe. His work is characterized by an extremely professional, analytical and sensitive view”.

The Vorarlberg National Library in Austria has an extensive catalog of part of his photographic work.

The graphic ogram of Ignacio Martínez is preserved in the Vorarlberg National Library in Austria.

Martínez is a member of the Architectural Photographers Association in Austria. He currently lives and works in Navia (Asturias), Spain.

One of his most recent works is the photographic documentation about the evolution of the construction of the Asturias Central University Hospital (Hospital Universitario Central de Asturias – HUCA).

== Artistic work ==
Expositions

- Some of the numerous expositions on which Martínez has participated are:
- Photographic exhibition “The Mute Eye”. Jarrio Hospital (Coaña), Asturias, Spain. (1991)
- Collective exhibition “Méjica seen by six photographers”, University of Oviedo, Asturias, Spain. (1991)
- Exhibition of Audio-visual and Photographs the Kornmarkt Theater. Bregenz, Austria.
- “The Mute Eye” nº 2. Vienna: 28/6 Raum and Institute of Architecture of Vorarlberg. (VAI). (2000)
- Photographic exhibitions of the architects Dietrich/Untrertriffaller, in Kirchheimteck, Germany. (2006)
- Traveling exhibition “Konstruktive Provokation” in France, Austria, Germany, Norway, Ireland and Spain (2008)
- Traveling exhibition “Austria West” in Milan and New York, among other places.
- Traveling exhibition “Form and non form” in Luxembourg and Hungary, among others places. (2005)
- Traveling exhibition LUZBIT Festival of the Photographic Image in Oviedo, Gijón, Avilés, Mieres and Sama de Langreo. Asturias, Spain. (2009)
- Collective exhibition in the Guillermina Caicoya Gallery. Oviedo, Spain.
- “Architectural exhibition of the Pinakothek der Moderne”. Munich, Germany. (2011)
- Art Fair, Oviedo 2011.
- Retrospective exhibition. Dome Room, Vorarlberger Landesbibliothek. Bregenz, Austria. (2012)
- Photographic Exhibition of the File of Jesus Martinez of the 20 years of his death. Navia, Asturias, Spain.

Some of the numerous works on which Martínez has participated appear in this web www.nextroom.at

== Prizes ==
- Most Beautiful Book “of the world”, silver medal, the Book Fair of Leipzig (Germany)
- National prize to Most beautiful Book of Austria, in the category of Innovation, with The mute eye nº 2.
- First prize in the Photographic Competition “Week of the Armed Forces” of Coruña, Spain. (1990)
- First prize in II the National Competition of Photography Marques of Casariego. Mud wall, Asturias, Spain. (1991)
- First prize in the I Photographic Competition “European Speedboat Racing Championship”. Navia, Asturias, Spain. (1988)
- First prize “Photographic Rally Western Asturias”. Asturias, Spain. (1988)
- First prize in III the Photographic Competition “Speedboat racing 92”. Navia, Asturias, Spain.

== Publications ==
His work as photographer can be seen in numerous publications and national and international magazines.

Bau-und to kunstdenkmäler im Fürstentum Liechtenstein. Ed. Luterach: Dieth-Kulturverlag, 1997

- Río Navia. La revista de la cuenca del Navia. (Mensual). Navia, Imagen Net 7, 1998–2000
- Der stumme blick nº 2 = La mirada muda nº 2 = The mute eye nº 2. [S. l.] : I. M. Austria, 2001
- Reflexion und transparez. Bauten für Helvetia Patria St. Gallen. Eine architektur von Herzog & de Meuron. Sant Gallen: Helvetia-Patria-Holding, 2002

- Konstructive provokation. Vorarlberger: Architektur Institut, 2003
- Villa Thérèse: ville de Fribourg. Fribourg, 2005
- Ingenios hidráulicos de la cuenca de Meiro: un viaje iniciático por el río de los meandros / Juan Méjica; fotografías Ignacio Martínez. Oviedo: Fundación Méjica, 2008
- Laboral, ciudad de la cultura. Asturias: RECREA, 2008
- 1000 X European architecture. Berlin Braun, 2008
- The Phaidon atlas of 21st. century world architecture. Londres: Phaidon, 2008 Architectural and artistic monuments in the Principality of Liechtenstein Authors: Dieth, Volkmar Súarez, Ignacio Martinez. Wilhelm, Anton. Lauterach, Austria : Dieth-Kulturverlag, 1997. 2008
- Collaboration in the monograph Marte-Marte, National Prize for the Most Beautiful Book of Austria and the World, in the category of Architecture, at the International Book Fair in Leipzig, Germany.
- Collaboration in the monograph Hermann Kaufmann, National Prize for the Most Beautiful Book of Austria, in the category of Technique.
- Collaboration in Building the Alps, National Prize for the Most Beautiful Book in Switzerland.
- New cultural centers for the 21st century in Spain. Consensus and conflict. Madrid: Spanish Agency for International Cooperation for Development (AECID), 2010
- Collaboration with Otto Kapflinger in Architektur im sprachraum. Zurich: Park Books, 2014
- El Vidural: Architecture, flora and fauna, landscapes, peasants. Siero: La Fábrica de Libros, 2018
- Council of Navia. Navia: Senda Color, 2019
- Council of Coaña. Coaña: Senda Color, 2020
- Río Navia. Viaje fotográfico-literario: La Fábrica de Libros, 2021
- Concejo de El Franco: Senda Color S.L., 2022

Collaborator of the following international architectural journals:

- A + U. Tokyo
- Bau Welt. Berlin
- L'Arquitecture d'aujourd'jui. Paris
- Architektur Aktuell
- Domus. Milan
- Wall Paper. London
- Escandinavian Architects
