= Baíña =

- Parish

- Location within Spain
- Coordinates: 43.283333°N 5.833333°W
- Country: Spain
- Autonomous community: Asturias
- Province: Asturias
- Municipality: Mieres

Baíña is one of 15 parishes (administrative divisions) in Mieres, a municipality within the province and autonomous community of Asturias, in northern Spain.

== Villages ==
- Baíña
- Cardeo Baxo
- Cardeo Riba
- El Barrial
- El Molín
- El Navalín
- El Padrún
- El Puente
- El Tunelón
- L'Ortigal
- La Barraca
- La Casuca
- La Escalabá
- La Gatera
- La Muela
- La Teyera
- Los Barreros
- Peñule
- Pumardongo
- Trespalacio
- Valmurián
