= Xaviel Vilareyo =

Asturian writer

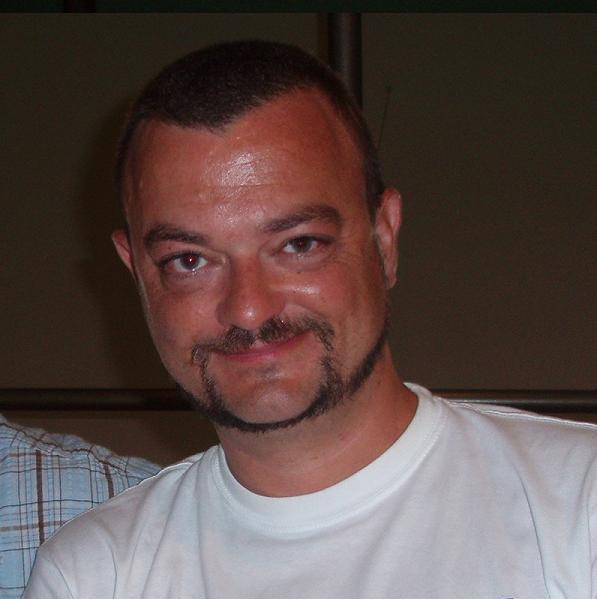
Photo of Xaviel Vilareyo

Xaviel Vilareyo y Villamil (1967 – 19 May 2015) was an Asturian writer born in Mieres in the Province of Asturias, Spain in 1967. He is associated with the Asturian literary group of the 1990s.

== Education ==
He graduated in Law from Oviedo University and became a high school teacher of music in Madrid, Spain. A teacher of the Asturian language, Vilareyo developed the first organized courses of Asturian outside of Asturies, in Madrid in 2001.

== Poetry ==
Vilareyo's first book of poetry, Cróniques del recuerdu, written in the Astur-Leonese language, secured his first public award in 1995. His activity within the Asturian language and culture increased after 1995 with other poetry and narrative awards, such as the Valentin Andrés Literature Prize and the Vila de Sarria Poetry Prize in 1997, the Xeira Award in 1998, the Elvira Castañón Poetry Award in 1999, and the Asturian Academy Award of Theatre 2009, among others. He has published literary work in many Asturian and Spanish magazines such as Pretexto, Lletres Asturianes, Reloj de arena, Sietestrellu, Lliteratura, El signo del gorrión, Isla Desnuda, Calicanto, Estío, Texturas, "N'ast", "Fusión" and many others and also became essayist in several other publications such as El canciu'l Cuélebre, Lletres asturianes, Entrambasauguas or Asturies memoria encesa, always concerning the Asturian national language, culture and history.

His other books of poetry include Más que probable (1998), Os novos poemas (1999), and El camín d'inquietú (2002). He has as well authored two books of tales, La causa más probable (2006) and "Doña Terina" (2010), essays like "Los ámbitos de la nación asturiana" (2008), "Historia del cine asturianu" (2009), "Les Asturies y el nacionalismu bascu" (2012) and has written a modern Method of Asturian Language. Becoming a recognized playwright with the publication of "La fuxida" (2011) that received the Asturian Academy Award of 2009. He also appears in several anthologies of asturian literature such as Muestra de nueva poesía (1998), Cinco años de lliteratura asturiana (1999), Na boca de todos (2006), Unde lletras falan (2006) and "Camín de Bimenes" (2007).

He was organizer of the Xunta d'Escritores Asturianos (Asturian Writers Council) in Oviedo in 2005, 2008, 2010 and 2012.

He was also founder and administrator of the Festival de Cine Asturianu (Asturian Film Festival) since the year 2005, promoting the Asturian national cinema.

He died on 19 May 2015 at age 48.
