= Figareo =

- Parish

- Location within Spain
- Country: Spain
- Autonomous community: Asturias
- Province: Asturias
- Municipality: Mieres

Figareo is one of 15 parishes (administrative divisions) in Mieres, a municipality within the province and autonomous community of Asturias, in northern Spain.

== Villages ==
- Agualestro
- Arriondo
- Cauxal
- Cortina
- Cutiellos
- El Quemaeru
- Felguerúa
- Figareo
- L'Aproceúriu
- La Cuesta
- La Formiguera
- La Llavandera
- La Pena
- La Pena'l Padrún
- La Riquela
- Los Cuarteles
- Nandieḷḷo
- Peñule
- Pumarín
- Repipe
- Santa Marina
- Sarabia
- Sobrelesvegues
- Vegalafonte
- Vegapiqueros
- Villadominica
