= Premio de Novela Casino de Mieres =

Spanish literary prize

Literary Short Novel Casino de Mieres (Premio de Novela Casino de Mieres) is a Spanish literary prize awarded annually since 1980 in Mieres (Asturias) to an original and unpublished short novel. It is selected by an Award Committee consisting of great personalities from Asturias Literary and Arts circle.

== History ==
The Prize was established in 1980 by the President of Sociedad Casino de Mieres, Mr. Luis San Narciso Altamira, with a sponsorship deal from financial institution Cajastur. Initially, the award was formed by the first edition of the novel and an economic prize of 100.000 pesetas.

From its formation the Prize has been considered prestigious and its recognition has grown up, being considered nowadays as one of the most important Spanish literary prizes regarding reputation and quality of novels. Writers from Spain, Europe and South America have taken part in the running last years.

In 1996 the President of Cajastur, Mr. Manuel Menéndez Menéndez, decided to set the prize money at one million of pesetas (about €6,000), given its notoriety and trajectory.

== At present ==
Currently this prize is awarded annually during a special ceremony called "Café Literario", in the second week of June, coinciding with Mieres Patron Saint's Day.

Many personalities from cultural scene attend this ceremony, in the Salón de los Espejos in Casino de Mieres facilities, and the Jury presents finalist works and the winner novel.

In fall a new celebration ceremony is carried out also in Mieres for the book launch, which is edited by KRK Ediciones from 2005.

== Contestants and award ==
All writers can participate, regardless of nationality, proposing original and unpublished works, from 80 to 130 pages, written in Spanish.

The Award is formed by the first edition of the novel and a monetary reward of 6,600 €.

== Winning novels and awarded authors ==
Winning Novels & Awarded Authors
YEAR	NOVEL	AUTHOR	PROVINCE	AUTHOR’S REMARKS	LINKS
2011	Helena Kín	Virginia C. Aguilera	Zaragoza	Graduada en Administración de Empresas	
2010	La Balada del Trampero Sentimental	Damián Torrijos	Huesca	Escritor	
2009	El Sueño de la Impostura	José Antonio Ramírez Lozano	Badajoz	Escritor	https://www.escritoresdeextremadura.com/escritoresdeextremadura/documento/art078.htm
2008	Cuatro Cuentos de Amor y el Intocable Absurdo	Inés Marful Amor	Asturias	Doctora en Literatura Española y Filosofía. Escritora	
2007	Galeón de Tornaviaje	José Manuel Parrilla	Valencia	Licenciado en Derecho	
2006	La Noche Feroz	Ricardo Menéndez Salmón	Asturias	Licenciado en Filosofía. Escritor	
2005	Exteriores	José María Casanovas Baile	Barcelona	Licenciado en Historia del Arte. Escritor	
2004	Lavapies Ultramarinos	Javier Rodríguez Pérez-Rasilla	Cantabria	Escritor. Novelista	
2003	La Mujer del Número Áureo	Ignacio Díaz Hernández	Valencia	Escritor	
2002	La Quimera	José Antonio Mases	Asturias	Escritor	
2001	La Mujer Burkina	Manuel Villar Raso	Granada	Catedrático	https://www.ugr.es/~mvillarr/
2000	Mientras fue Verano	Esteban Greciet Aller	Asturias	Periodista	https://el.tesorodeoviedo.es/index.php?title=Esteban_Greciet_Aller https://web.archive.org/web/20120328113455/http://www.escritoresdeturismo.com/docs/socios/fichas/esteban_greciet_aller.php
1999	Queda la Memoria	Luis Rodríguez Muñoz	Madrid	Licenciado en Ciencias Económicas y Empresariales	
1998	Babel	José Luis Mediavilla	Burgos	Médico. Doctor en Neurología y Psiquiatría. Académico de la Real Academia de Medicina de Asturias-León	https://web.archive.org/web/20120328113448/http://www.rampra.org/PDF/Jose%20Luis%20Mediavilla%20Ruiz.pdf
1997	Como Pez en la Arena	Patricia Mateo Anula	Cuenca	Licenciada en Ciencias de la Información	
1996	Soledad de Entonces	Domingo Henares Martínez	Albacete	Catedrático de Literatura	
1995	Retablo de la Glorieta	Mariano Tudela	La Coruña	Periodista. Guionista	
1994	Tardes de Chocolate	Raúl Torres Herreros	Cuenca	Periodista. Novelista	http://mcnbiografias.com/app-bio/do/show?key=torres-herreros-raul
1993	Memorias de un Seductor	Alfredo Macías Macías	Huelva	Periodista. Novelista. Publicista	http://www.juntadeandalucia.es/cultura/opencms/export/bibliotecas/bibhuelva/informlocal/autores/alfredoMacias.html
1992	La Pólvora y la Sangre	Óscar Muñíz	Asturias	Abogado. Escritor. Historiador	
1991	Un Viaje Diabólico	Ernesto Salanova Matas	Asturias	Abogado. Historiador. Novelista	
1990	Llanto en Isla Negra	José Manuel Costas Goberna	Pontevedra	Catedrático de Historia en Salamanca	
1989	Entre las Ruinas	Blas Parra Díaz	Valencia	Director General Del Archivo Municipal de Valencia	
1988	El Paso de Faes	José Ignacio Gracia Noriega	Asturias	Novelista. Biógrafo premiado. Ensayista. Columnista	
1987	Fuentes Fugitivas	Meliano Peraile	Cuenca	Crítico de actualidad	https://web.archive.org/web/20120213140654/http://www.ateneocultural1mayo.org/index.php?option=com_k2&view=item&layout=item&id=120&Itemid=177
1986	Diálogo del Éxodo	Luis Fernández Roces	Asturias	Escritor. Titulado ATS	http://www.vivirasturias.com/asturias/langreo/fernandez-roces-jose-luis/es
1985	Reencuentro	Teresa Barbero	Ávila	Novelista premiada. Documentalista del INI	
1984	La Ternura del Dragón	Ignacio Martínez de Pisón	Zaragoza	Licenciado. Columnista del Diario ABC en Madrid	
1983	Los Amantes del Sol Poniente	Ramón Hernández	Madrid	Ingeniero de Montes. Escritor	https://www.aache.com/alcarrians/hernandez.htm
1982	El Sueño de la Razón	Francisco González Orejas	Asturias	Periodista. Ejecutivo de TVE del Principado de Asturias	
1981	La Escalera en el Aire	Andrés Quintanilla Buey	Valladolid	Crítico de Teatro. Escritor	
1980	Viage de los Cavalleros sin Rostro	Eduardo Méndez Riestra	Asturias	Escritor. Novelista	https://el.tesorodeoviedo.es/index.php?title=Eduardo_M%C3%A9ndez_Riestra

== See also ==
- List of literary awards
- Spanish literature
