= Emilio Alarcos Llorach =

Spanish linguist and philologist (1922–1998)

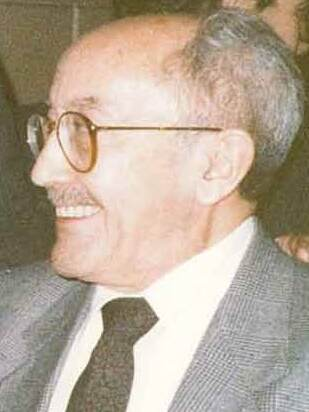
- Emilio Alarcos in 1989
- Born: January 22, 1922; Salamanca, Spain
- Died: March 22, 1998 (aged 76); Oviedo, Spain
- Occupations: Linguist, philologist, literary critic
- Known for: Structural grammar of Spanish

Emilio Alarcos Llorach (22 January 1922 – 22 March 1998) was a Spanish linguist, philologist, and literary critic. He is regarded as one of the most influential Spanish linguists of the 20th century and a leading figure in structural grammar applied to the Spanish language.

== Early life and education ==
Alarcos was born in Salamanca, Spain. He studied Romance philology at the University of Valladolid and earned his doctorate at the Complutense University of Madrid. He later studied structural linguistics in Paris, where he was influenced by European structuralist theories.

== Academic career ==
In 1951, Alarcos was appointed professor of Spanish Language at the University of Oviedo, where he taught for more than four decades.

His book Gramática estructural (1951) is considered a foundational work in applying structuralist methods to Spanish grammar. He also contributed significantly to the study of phonology, syntax, and morphology.

Alarcos founded the so-called "Oviedo School of Linguistics", which influenced Spanish grammar research throughout the second half of the 20th century.

Alarcos became a member of the Real Academia Española (RAE) in 1972. He played a key role in modernizing the Academy's linguistic criteria and led efforts to revise and update the official grammar of the Spanish language. After his death, the RAE published a revised version of its grammar largely based on his research and proposals.

== Literary criticism ==
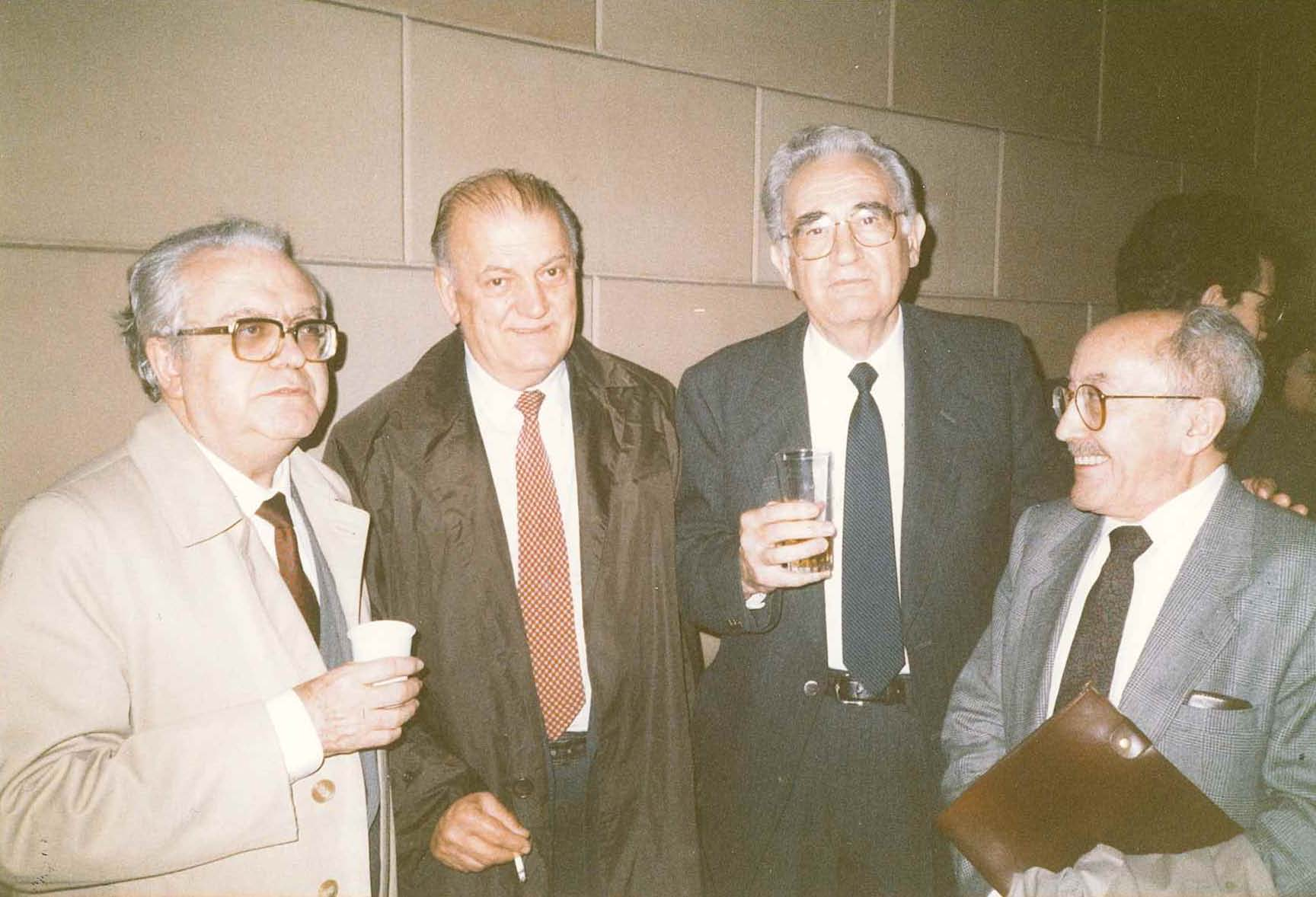
Philologists Gregorio Salvador, Eugen Coșeriu, Francisco Marsá and Emilio Alarcos at the University of Barcelona in March 1989.

In addition to his linguistic work, Alarcos wrote literary criticism, particularly on the works of Federico García Lorca and other Spanish poets. His analyses combined formal linguistic methods with literary insight.

== Legacy ==
Emilio Alarcos Llorach is widely regarded as a pioneer of modern Spanish linguistics. His teaching and publications left a lasting impact on both academic linguistics and Spanish grammar education. The Instituto Universitario de Lingüística Emilio Alarcos at the University of Oviedo is named in his honor.

== Selected works ==
- Fonología española (1950)
- Gramática estructural (1951)
- Estudios de gramática funcional del español
- Crítica del lenguaje literario
