= Gaḷḷegos =

- Parish

- Location within Spain
- Coordinates: 43.383333°N 5.933333°W
- Country: Spain
- Autonomous community: Asturias
- Province: Asturias
- Municipality: Mieres

Gaḷḷegos is one of 15 parishes (administrative divisions) in Mieres, a municipality within the province and autonomous community of Asturias, in northern Spain.

== Towns ==
- Canga Fondera
- Canga Cimera
- Cenera
- Foz
- Gaḷḷegos
- La Fariega
- La Pandieḷḷa
- Ḷḷandegustio
- Los Fornieḷḷos
- Miruxeo
- Vistrimir
- Viḷḷar
