= Figaredo =

Figaredo is a Spanish surname. Notable people with the surname include:

- Enrique Figaredo Alvargonzalez (born 1959), Jesuit priest and the Apostolic Prefect of Battambang
- Ismael Figaredo (1887–1964), Spanish mining entrepreneur and sports leader
- José María Figaredo (born 1988), Spanish politician
- Rodrigo de Rato y Figaredo (born 1949), Spanish businessman and politician

== See also ==
- Figareo, a municipality within the province of Asturias, in northern Spain.
