= University of Oviedo =

Public university in Asturias, Spain

Coordinates: 43.3618°N 5.8463°W

- Universidad de Oviedo
- Seal of the University of Oviedo
- Motto: Sigillum Regiae Universitatis Ovetensis
- Type: Public
- Established: 1574; 452 years ago
- Rector: Ignacio Villaverde
- Academic staff: 2,154
- Students: 19,298
- Undergraduates: 16,564
- Postgraduates: 2,734
- Doctoral students: 1,160
- Location: Oviedo, Asturias, Spain
- Campus: Oviedo, Gijón and Mieres
- Colors: Green and Black
- Website: www.uniovi.es

University rankings

Global – Overall
- ARWU World: 601–700 (2023)
- QS World: 901-950 (2026)
- THE World: 801–1000 (2024)
- USNWR Global: =722 (2023)

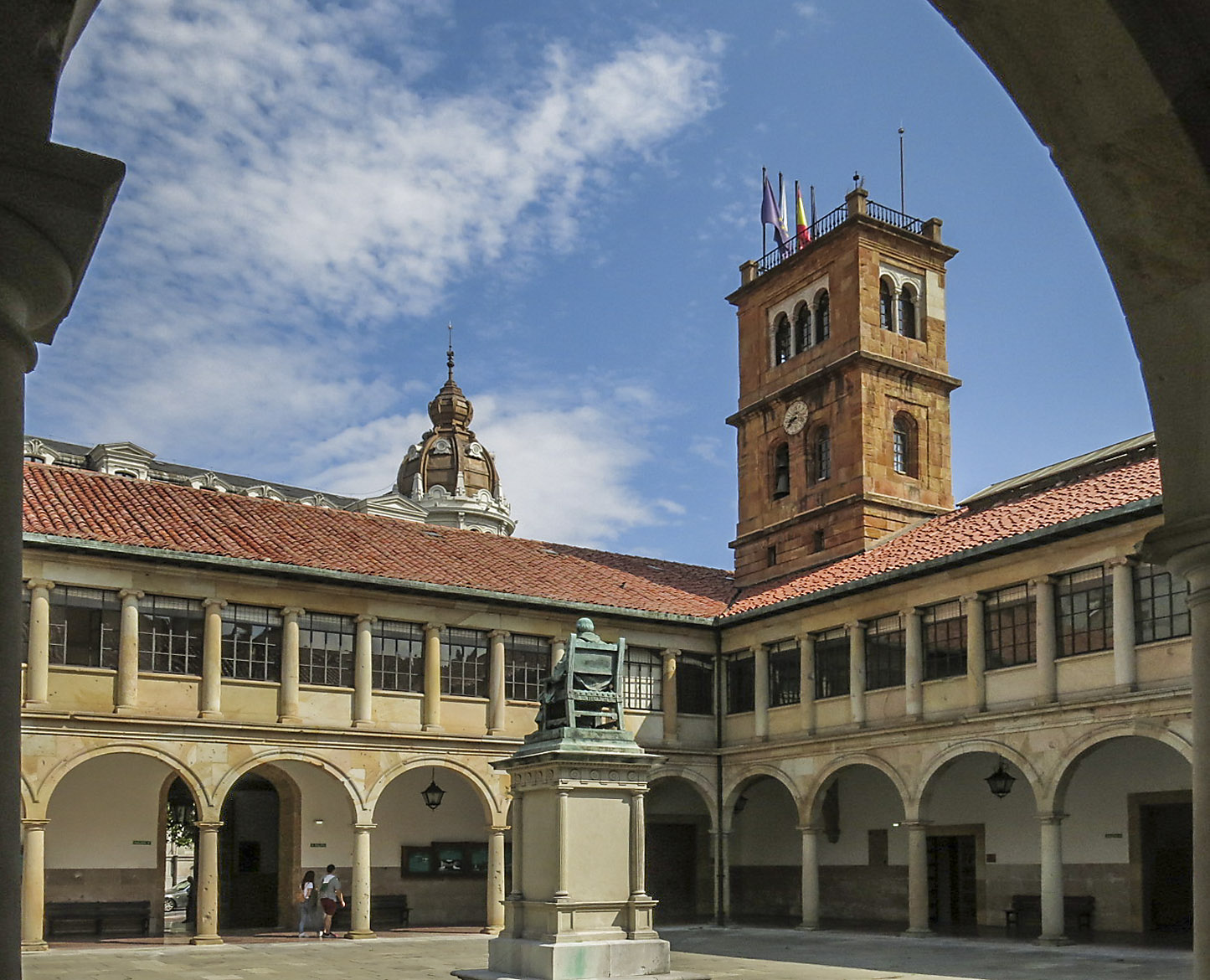
Original university building in Oviedo

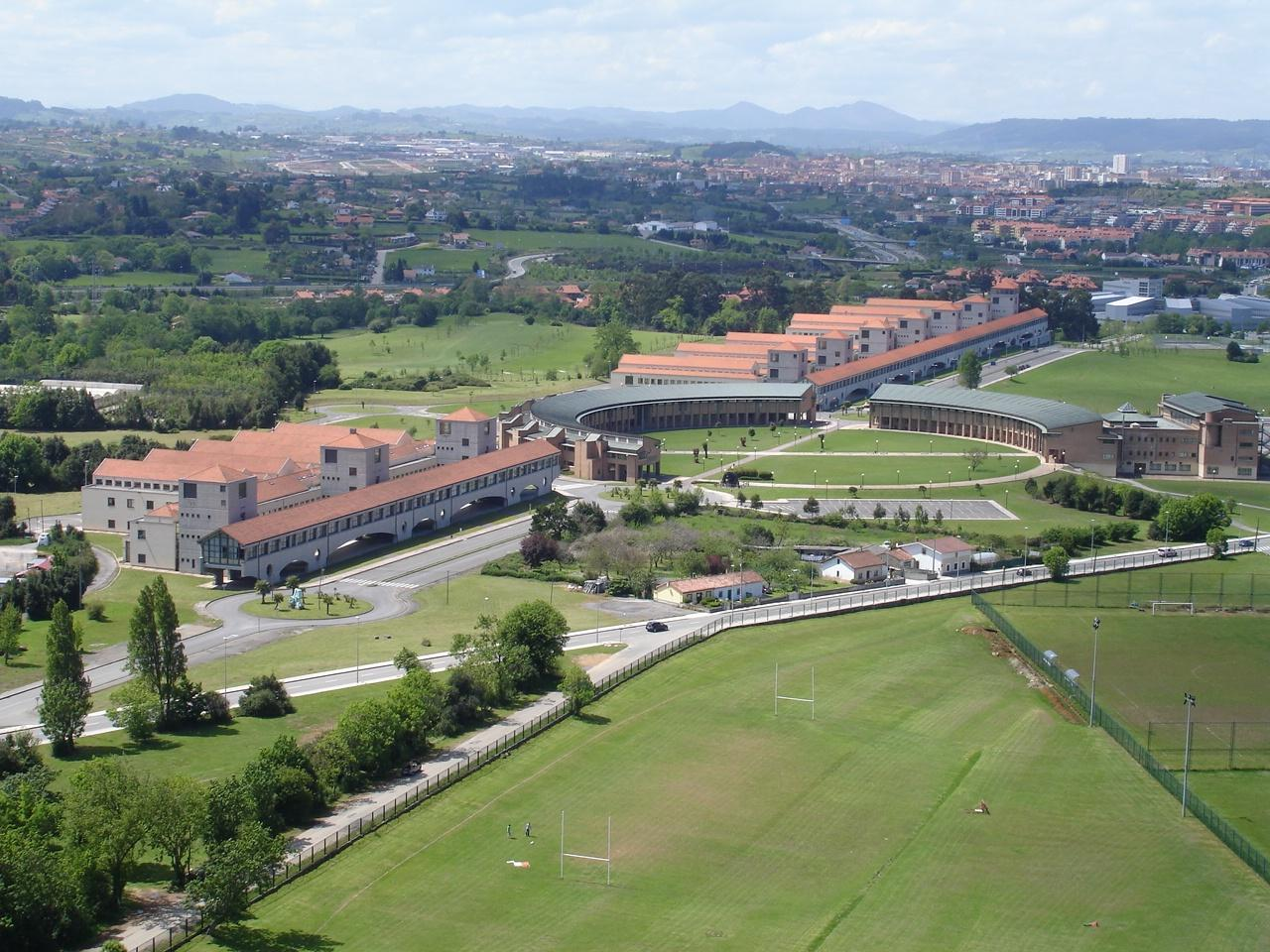
Viesques campus in Gijón

The University of Oviedo (Spanish: Universidad de Oviedo, Asturian: Universidá d'Uviéu) is a public university in Asturias (Spain). It is the only university in the region and is formed by seven campus and research centres, located in Oviedo, Gijón and Mieres.

== History ==
The University of Oviedo was established under the terms and conditions of the will of Archbishop Fernando de Valdés Salas (1483–1568), who was the General Inquisitor under Philip II of Spain, and funded by his estate. In 1574 Pope Gregory XIII granted the papal bull to create the university and in 1604 Philip III issued its charter. It first opened for the teaching of classes on September 21, 1608.

The ancient university had three faculties: the Faculty of Arts, which every student had to graduate from in order to continue his training in one of the other; and the Faculties of Theology and Law, sometimes known as the higher faculties.

After the French invasion of Spain the Historical Building of the university was occupied by invading troops and lectures were suspended until the War ended in 1812.

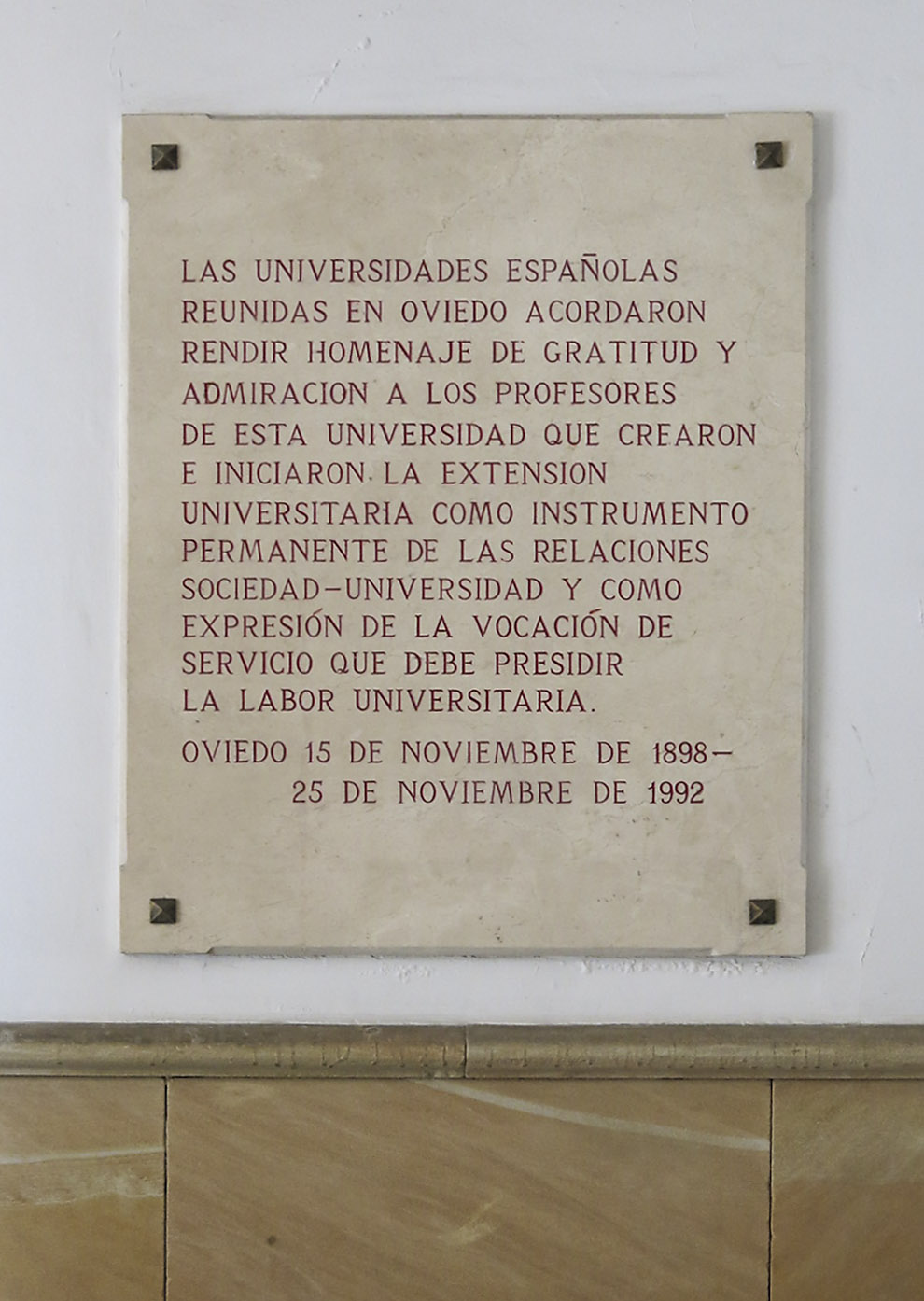
Sign commemorating the extension programme.

During the 19th century, a group of liberal professors tried to bring the university closer to the working class with the Extensión Universitaria, a popular education programme sponsored by the institution. However, this goal was not fully achieved, and on October 13, 1934, during the leftist miners revolt in Asturias, the university (including its Library and the Art Gallery) was set fire either by the revolutionaries or the government bomber airplanes. It was rebuilt after the Spanish Civil War (1936–1939).

The number of faculties has multiplied in the modern university, both through subdivisions of the traditional four faculties, and through the absorption of academic disciplines which have developed within originally vocational schools, in areas such as engineering or nursing.

Nowadays, the university has 31 faculties and professional schools, offering degrees and diplomas in over 150 fields of study.

== Schools and colleges ==
School of Law (since 1608), Teaching and Education (1845), Chemistry (1848), Polytechnic School of Mieres (1855), Jovellanos Faculty of Commerce, Tourism and Social Sciences (1866), Gijón Polytechnic School of Engineering (1888), Philosophy and Letters (1892), Economy and Business (1908), Teaching and Geology (1958), Mining Engineering (1959), Biology (1961), Medicine and Health Sciences (1968), Merchant Marine (1979), School of Computer Engineering (1982), Sciences (1990), Psychology (1991).

== Departments ==
- Experimental Sciences: Analytic and Physical-Chemistry, Chemical Engineering and Environment Technologies, Mathematics, Organic and Inorganic Chemistry, Physics, Statistics and Operations Research and Mathematics Education.
- Health Sciences: Biochemistry and Molecular Biology, Biology of Organisms and Systems, Functional Biology, Medicine, Morphology and Cellular Biology, Surgery and Medical-Surgical Specialities.
- Engineering: Telecommunication, Computer Sciences, Construction and Manufacturing Engineering, Electrical, Electronical, Computers and Systems Engineering, Energy, Materials Science and Metallurgical Engineering, Mining Working and Prospecting, Nautical Science and Technologies.
- Social Sciences and Law: Accounting, Applied Economy, Basic Legal Sciences, Business Administration, Education Sciences, Economy, Private and Companies Law, Psychology, Public Law, Quantitative Economy, Sociology.
- Humanities: Anglo-German and French Philology, Art and Music History, Classical and Romance Philology, Geography, History, Philosophy, Spanish Philology.

== Facilities ==
The school has a large number of places in different classrooms, total counted 6 classrooms in the building, with spaces ranging from the 171 seats in the classroom with greater capacity, up to 75 seats in the lower-capacity classroom. In addition to these classrooms, there is a room hold up to 112 places, which are usually done lectures and presentations both subjects, as final projects. Special mention also the different laboratories that school has a total of 15 laboratories. Included in this equipment of various kinds, both PC and MAC.

== Staff ==
Rector: Ignacio Villaverde Menéndez

General Secretary: Ángel Espiniella Menéndez

General Manager: José Antonio Díaz Lago

Vice-rectorates:
- Delegate for Coordination and University Strategy: Juan Carlos San Pedro Veledo
- Vice-rectorate for Academic Organization: Pedro Alonso Velázquez
- Vice-rectorate for Research: S. Irene Díaz Rodríguez
- Vice-rectorate for University Extension and International Development: María Pilar García Cuetos
- Vice-rectorate for Student Affairs: Alfonso Joaquín López Muñiz
- Vice-rectorate for Material and Technological Resources:
- Vice-rectorate for Crosscutting Actions and Enterprise Cooperation: Susana Luque Rodríguez
- Vice-rectorate for Susteinability and Digitalization: Inés Peñuelas Sánchez
- Vice-rectorate for Studies and Teaching: Juan Manuel Marchante Gayón
- Vice-rectorate for International Affairs: Ana Suárez Vázquez

Social Council: Ladislao Azcona (President), representatives of political parties, trade-unions, employers, etc.
Council of Government : Rectoral Council and Representatives from University Staff, Faculties, Schools and Departments
University Staff: Representatives of Professors, Administration Staff and Students
Rectoral Council: Rector together with the Vice-Chancellors

== Notable alumni ==
- Ana Cano, philologist
- Antonio Arrúe Zarauz, Basque cultural activist and Carlist politician
- Antón de Marirreguera, Asturian-language writer
- Melchor de Navarra y Rocafull, viceroy of Peru
- Gaspar Melchor de Jovellanos, Enlightenment statesman, author and philosopher
- Agustín Argüelles, politic
- Faustino Rodríguez-San Pedro Díaz-Argüelles, Minister of Finance
- Rafael del Riego, general and liberal politician
- Leopoldo Alas Clarín, journalist and writer
- Armando Palacio Valdés, novelist and critic
- Melquíades Álvarez, politic
- Antonio Flores de Lemus, economist and politic
- Ramón Pérez de Ayala, novelist
- Alejandro Casona, poet and playwright
- Gonzalo Torrente Ballester, novelist
- Luis Suárez Fernández, historian
- Carlos Bousoño, poet
- Ángel González, poet
- José Manuel Castañón, writer
- Santiago Vera-Rivera, composer
- Gil Carlos Rodríguez Iglesias, former judge at the European Court of Justice
- Miguel Dongil y Sánchez, historian
- Olvido García Valdés, poet and essayist
- Luis Martínez Noval, Minister of Labour and Social Security (1990–1993)
- Gustavo Suárez Pertierra, minister of Education and Science (1993–1995) and Defence (1995–1996)
- Gaspar Llamazares, leader of United Left Coalition (Izquierda Unida) (2000–2008)
- Miguel Álvarez-Fernández, musician
- Ignacio Martinez Suarez, photographer
- Fernando Suárez González, Minister of Labour (1974–1975)
- Víctor García de la Concha, Director of Royal Spanish Academy
- Salvador Gutiérrez Ordóñez, linguist
- Alejandro Fernández Sordo, lawyer and politician
- Regino Olivares, lawyer
- Sara Torres (born 1991), poet and novelist
- Xaviel Vilareyo, author
- Celso Arango, physician (psychiatrist)
- Darin Paine, development officer

== Notable professors ==
- Luis Alfonso de Carvallo, historian, rector of San Gregorio College
- Leopoldo Alas Clarín, journalist and writer
- Benito Jerónimo Feijoo, Enlightenment monk and scholar
- Rafael Altamira y Crevea, historian and lawyer
- Félix de Aramburu y Zuloaga, lawyer and poet
- Matías Barrio y Mier, professor of law 1881–1892, Carlist political leader
- Fermín Canella Secades, historian
- Nicolás Salmerón y Alonso, politician, President of the First Spanish Republic (1873)
- Aniceto Sela Sampil, lawyer
- Jesús Arias de Velasco, lawyer
- José María Gil-Robles, politician, leader of the Right Wing under the II Republic
- Torcuato Fernández-Miranda, politician, president of the Spanish Cortes (1975–1977), interim prime minister (1974), vice-prime minister (1973–1974), General Secretary of the National Movement (Movimiento Nacional) (1969–1974)
- Carmina Virgili - first female professor
- Vicente Alberto Álvarez Areces, President of the Principality of Asturias from 1999 to 2011
- Luis Martínez Noval, minister of Labour and Social Security (1990–1993)
- Josep Oliú Creus, economist. President and CEO of Banco Sabadell
- Gustavo Bueno, notable philosopher
- Eloy Benito Ruano, historian
- Juan Ignacio Ruiz de la Peña Solar, historian
- Sergio Marqués Fernández, politician, President of the Principality of Asturias from 1995 to 1999
- Aurelio González Ovies, poet
- Emilio Alarcos Llorach, poet and linguist
- Vicente Miguel Gotor Santamaría, chemist
- Antonello Novelli, neuroscientist
- Paz Andrés Sáenz de Santamaría, lawyer
- José Luis García Delgado, economist
- M. Teresa Fernández Sánchez, biochemist
- José Joaquín Barluenga Mur, chemist
- Carlos López Otín, biochemist
- Ana Cano, philologist and president of Academy of the Asturian Language
- Pablo Xuan Manzano Rodríguez, Asturian-language linguist and educator (also alumni)

== Some honorary doctors ==
- 1967 Severo Ochoa
- 1968 Walter Hallstein
- 1976 Claudio Sánchez Albornoz
- 1982 Ramón Areces
- 1982 Günther Wilke
- 1985 Rafael Lapesa
- 1988 Óscar Arias Sánchez, presidente de Costa Rica
- 1991 Federico Mayor Zaragoza
- 1992 William Golding
- 1995 Lotfi A. Zadeh
- 1998 Sheila Sherlock
- 2001 Gil Carlos Rodríguez Iglesias
- 2007 Ángel González
- 2007 Juan José Millás
- 2008 Walter Alvarez
- 2008 Efim Zelmanov

== See also ==
- List of early modern universities in Europe
