= Church of Santa Eulalia de Ujo =

Coordinates: 43.204276°N 5.5211°W

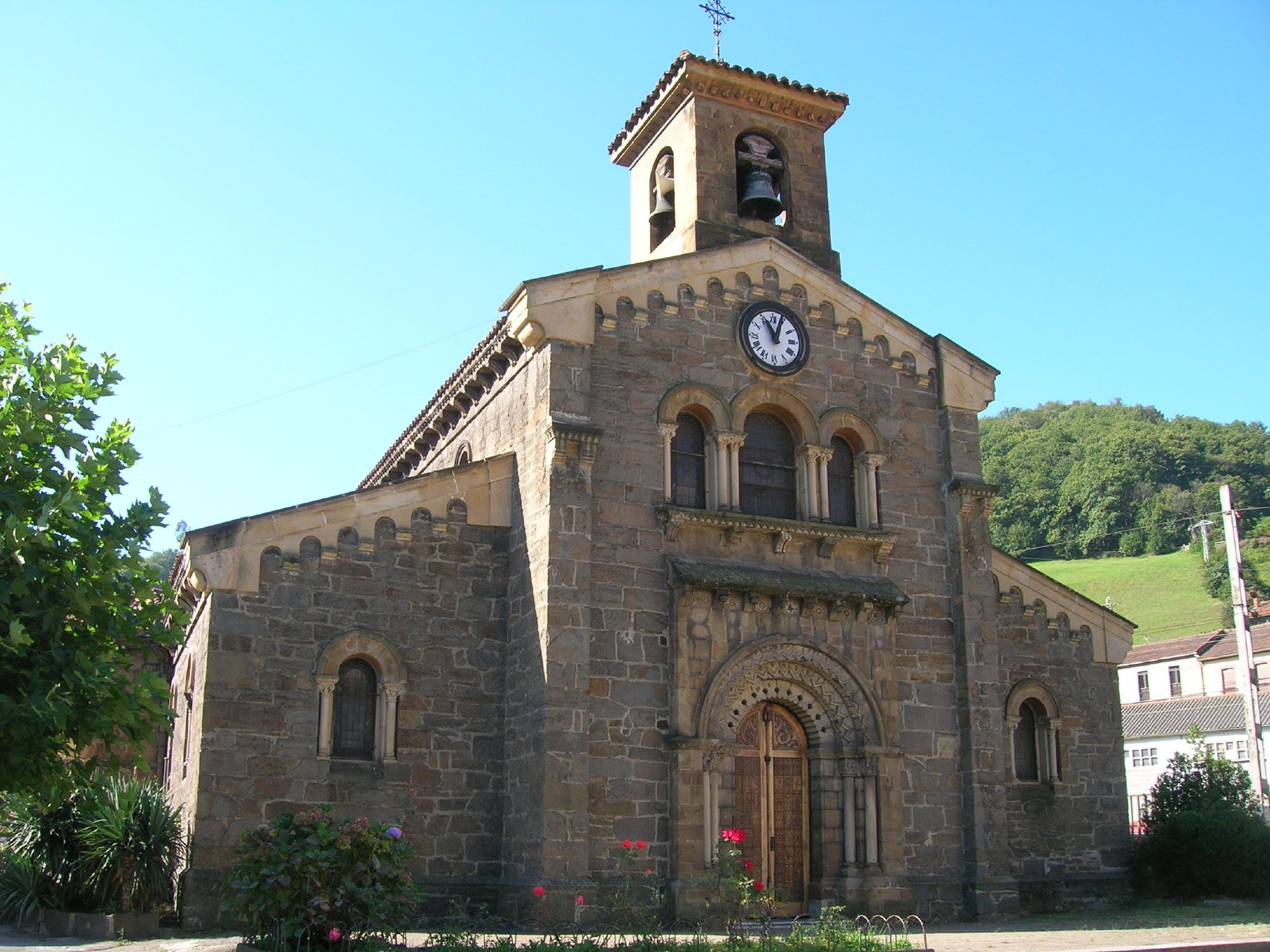
- Church of Santa Eulalia de Ujo
- Location: Asturias, Spain

Church of Santa Eulalia de Ujo (Spanish: Iglesia de Santa Eulalia de Ujo) is a church in the municipality of Mieres in the community of Asturias, Spain. The church with this name was erected in the 12th century, originally donated by Ordoño I in 860.

It was moved in 1922 to make way for a railroad. Elements of the original Romanesque church, including the main portal and parts of the apse were incorporated into the present church.

== See also ==
- Asturian art
- Catholic Church in Spain
