= El Pedregal =

El Pedregal, Spain
- Location within Province of Guadalajara Location within Castilla-La Mancha Location within Spain
- Coordinates: 40°46′52″N 1°34′10″W
- Country: Spain
- Autonomous community: Castile-La Mancha
- Province: Guadalajara
- Municipality: El Pedregal

Area
  - Total: 23.2 km^{2} (9.0 sq mi)
- Elevation: 1,193 m (3,914 ft)

Population (2025-01-01)
  - Total: 60
  - Density: 2.6/km^{2} (6.7/sq mi)
- Time zone: UTC+1 (CET)
  - Summer (DST): UTC+2 (CEST)

El Pedregal is a municipality located in the province of Guadalajara, Castile-La Mancha, Spain. According to the 2004 census (INE), the municipality had a population of 106 inhabitants.
