= Inocencio of Mary Immaculate =

Spanish priest and martyr

Saint Inocencio of Mary Immaculate C.P.
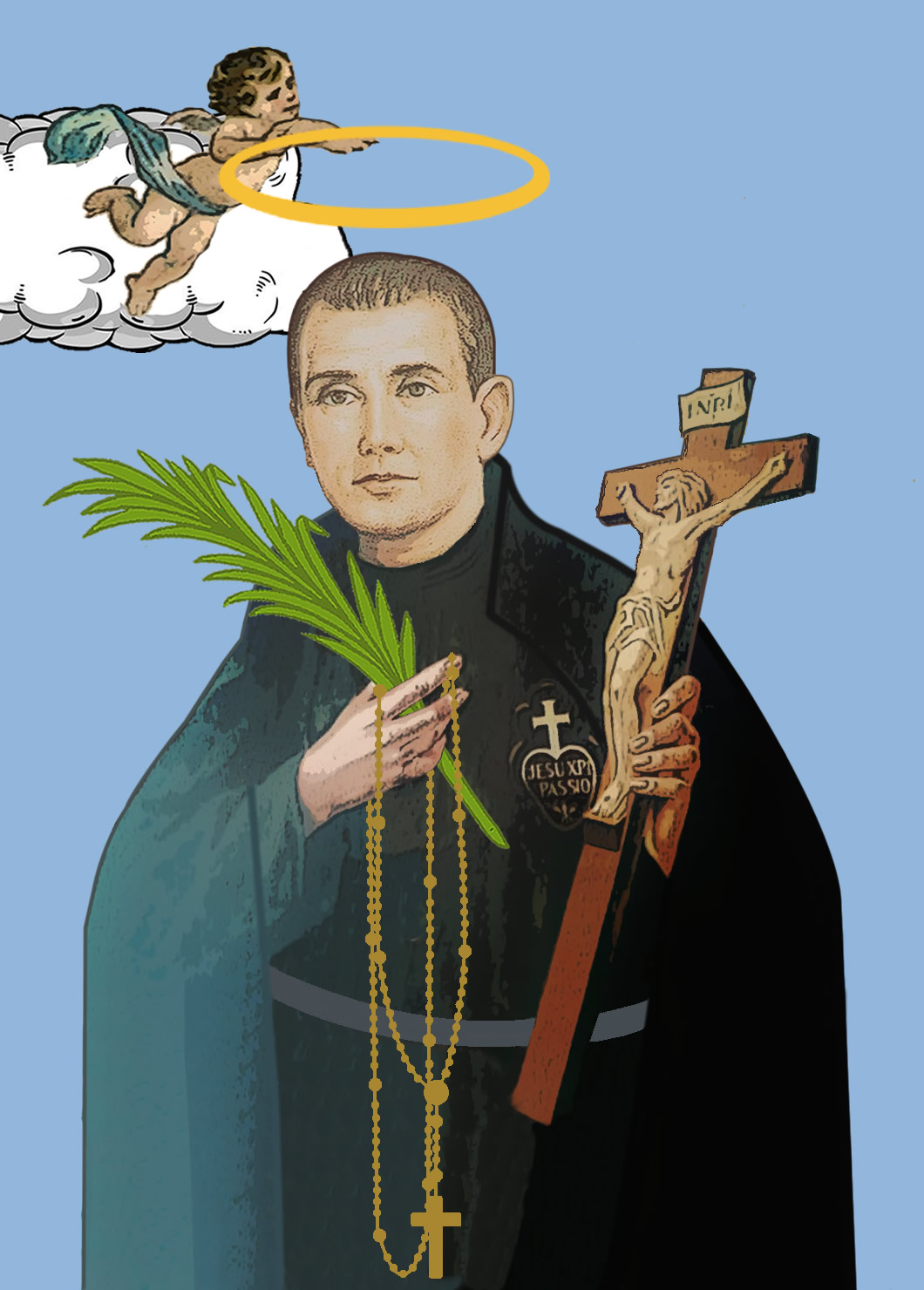

Martyr
- Born: Manuel Canoura Arnau; 10 March 1887; Santa Cilla do Valadouro, Galicia, Spain
- Died: 9 October 1934 (aged 47); Turón
- Venerated in: Roman Catholic Church
- Beatified: 19 April 1990
- Canonized: 21 November 1999, Italy by Pope John Paul II
- Feast: 9 October
- Attributes: Passionist habit and Passionist Sign

Inocencio of Mary Immaculate, CP (10 March 1887–9 October 1934), born Manuel Canoura Arnau, was a Catholic priest and member of the Passionists who was killed during the Asturias revolt. He and his companions are known collectively as the Martyrs of Turon. He was canonised by Pope John Paul II in 1999.

== Life ==
He was born on 10 March 1887, at Santa Cilla do Valadouro (Foz), near the Cantabrian coast in the province of Lugo (Galicia) and joined the Passionist seminary at the age of 14 at Peñafiel, near Valladolid. He joined the Passionist Congregation at Deusto (Biscay) and then continued his philosophy and theology. At Mieres, not far from Turón, he was given the sub-diaconate in 1910, the diaconate in 1912 and was ordained priest in 1920. As a priest he preached missions and also taught in various schools. Whilst he was in Mieres he had been asked by the Brothers of the Christian Schools (De La Salle) to hear the confessions of the children at their school as they prepared for their First Communion. This was at the time of the Asturias revolt, when communists and anti-clericalists had risen up against the Second Spanish Republic.

== Martyrdom ==
On Friday, 5 October 1934, a group of strikers forced their way into the Lasallian school in Turón, where Father Inocencio was exercising his priestly ministry. He was imprisoned alongside the eight Brothers in the so-called "House of the People" to await the judgment of the Republican committee. They were condemned to death and, in the early hours of 9 October 1934, were executed by a firing squad. Their bodies were buried in a common grave.

Inocencio is regarded by the Catholic Church as one of the Martyrs of the Spanish Civil War. Although his death occurred some two years prior to the outbreak of the war, his death was part of the same violence and anti-clerical feeling of that period in Spain's history.

== Canonization ==
Inocencio and his eight fellow martyrs were declared venerable in 1989, beatified on April 19, 1990, then canonized on November 21, 1999, by Pope John Paul II.

== See also ==
- Martyrs of the Spanish Civil War
- 498 Spanish Martyrs
- Martyrs of Daimiel
- Red Terror (Spain)
