= Celada Marlantes =

Locality in Cantabria, Spain

Coordinates: 42°56′49″N 4°6′12″W

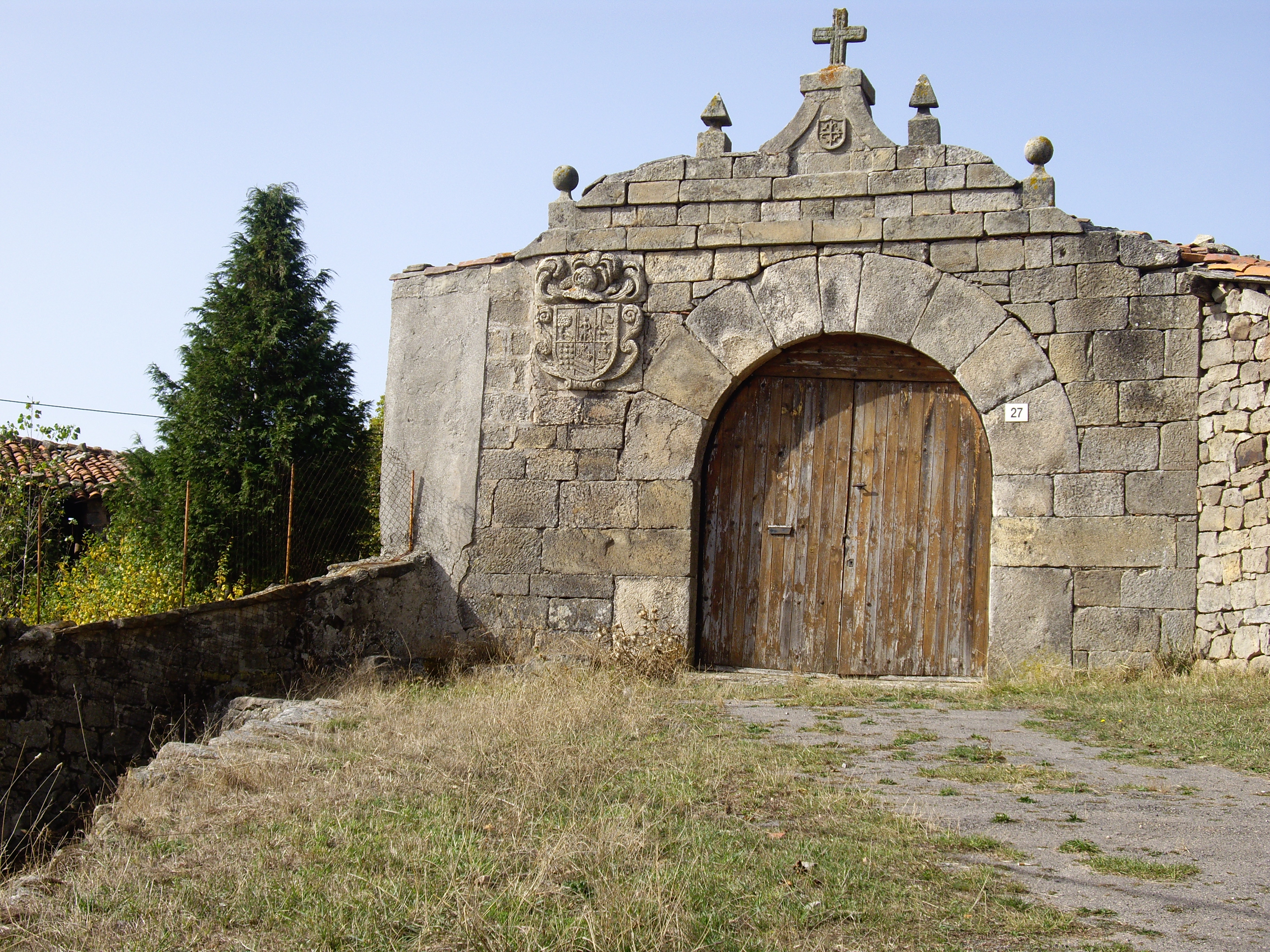
Celada-Marlantes

Celada Marlantes is a locality in the municipality of Campoo de Enmedio, in the northern Spanish autonomous community of Cantabria.

== Geography ==
It has a Latitude of 42° 57' 0 North, a Longitude of 4° 5' 60 West, and an Altitude of 3481 feet.

== History ==
Celada Marlantes (also known as Las Rabas) is noted for archaeological findings, including research into domestication during the Iron Age. Denarii from the Turiaso mint have been discovered in the area, along with other locations west of the mint along the Cantabrian Coast.
