= Turón, Asturias =

Turón (Mieres)
- Parish
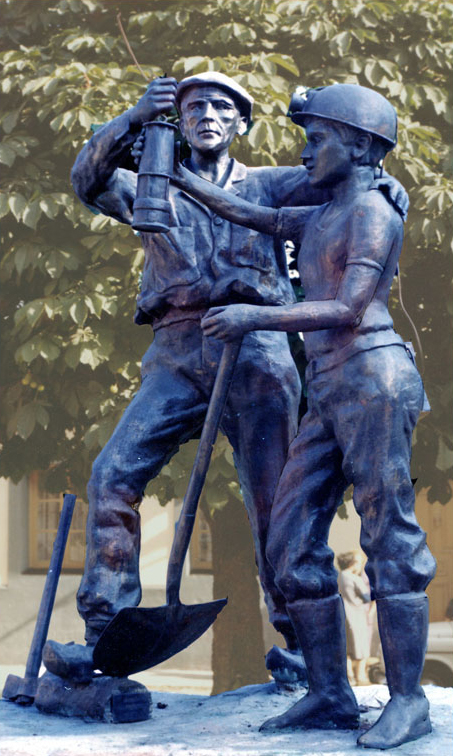
- Bronze statue in Turón

- Location within Spain
- Coordinates: 43.216667°N 5.783333°W
- Country: Spain
- Autonomous community: Asturias
- Province: Asturias
- Municipality: Mieres

Turón is one of 15 parishes (administrative divisions) in Mieres, a municipality within the province and autonomous community of Asturias, in northern Spain.

The Turón Valley was a major site of coal mining in northern Spain and a history of labor strikes with miners.

== See also ==
- Martyrs of Turon
