= Mieres =

- Municipality
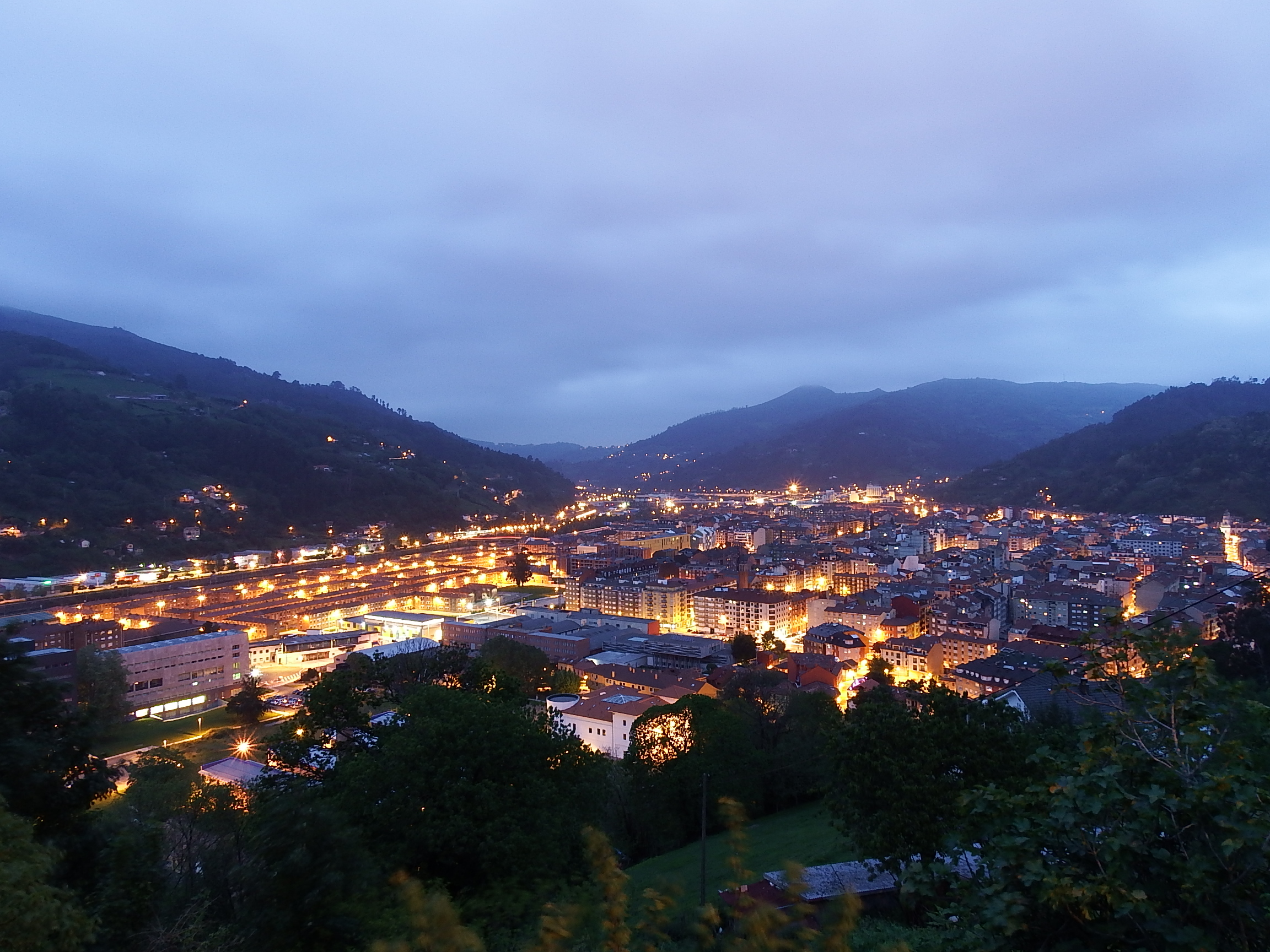
- Mieres del Camín, seat of the municipality.

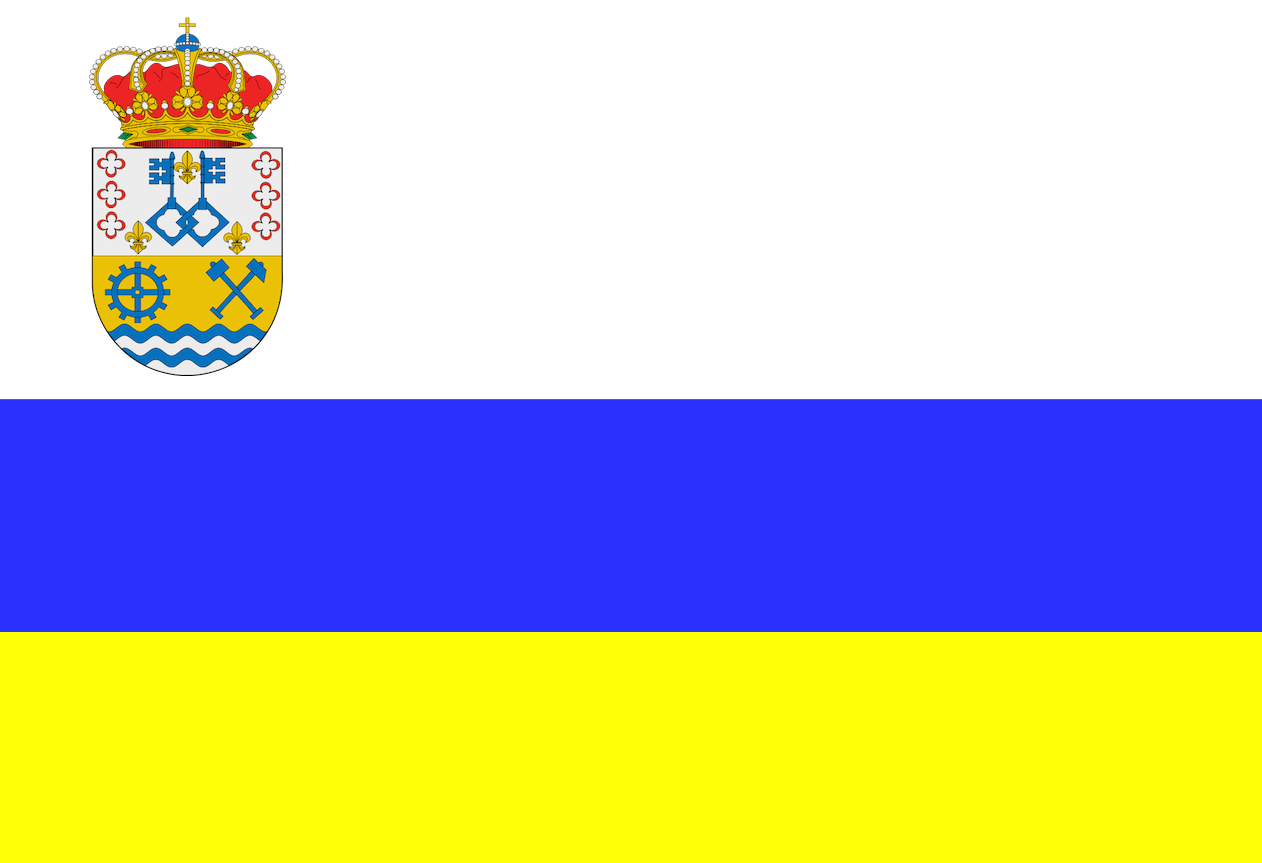
- Flag Coat of arms

- Location of Mieres in Asturias.

- Location in Spain
- Coordinates: 43°15′3″N 5°46′36″W
- Country: Spain
- Autonomous community: Asturias
- Province: Asturias
- Comarca: Caudal
- Capital: Mieres del Camín

Government
  - Mayor: Manuel Ángel Álvarez (IU)

Area
  - Total: 146.03 km^{2} (56.38 sq mi)
- Elevation: 386 m (1,266 ft)

Population (2025-01-01)
  - Total: 36,373
  - Density: 249.08/km^{2} (645.11/sq mi)
- Demonym: Mierenses
- Time zone: UTC+1 (CET)
  - Summer (DST): UTC+2 (CEST)
- Postal code: 33600
- Website: Official website

Mieres is a municipality of Asturias, northern Spain, with approximately 38,000 inhabitants. The municipality of Mieres is made up of the capital, Mieres del Camino and the villages of Baíña, Figaredo, Cenera, Loredo, La Peña, La Rebollada, Santullano, Santa Rosa, Seana, Ujo, Urbiés, Valdecuna, Santa Cruz, Ablaña, Turón, Gallegos, Bustiello.

== History ==
Mieres is the heart of the coal mining industry in Spain. The topography of Mieres is mountainous with the greatest population centers being located in the valley along the banks of the Caudal River (Río Caudal) valley in the center of Asturias. Before the Spanish Industrial Restructuring Mieres was one of the industrial backbones of Asturias, and hosted 70000 inhabitants in the 1960s. Today Mieres shelters a campus of the University of Oviedo and different museums in relation with the industrial heritage.

The municipality of Mieres is served by bus routes and Renfe Cercanias commuter lines, connected with Oviedo, Gijón and León.

== Festivals ==
Mieres’ most popular and important festival St. John's Bonfire (La Foguera de San Juan) occurs every June 24's eve, and is highlighted by a huge bonfire, cultural events, dancing, outdoor concerts, fireworks, al fresco dining and drinking. Another important festival is the Folixa na Primavera in April (Spring Fiesta), which includes dance and music performances from the nine European Celtic regions, food, drink and especially cider, (sidra).

== Politics ==
Local elections
Party/List	1979	1983	1987	1991	1995	1999	2003	2007	2011	2015	2019
PCE / IU-BA	9	7	7	6	9	7	6	5	10	12	15
FSA-PSOE	10	14	10	11	9	11	8	9	5	4	4
CD / AP / PP	1	4	4	5	7	7	7	7	4	3	2
Somos										2	0
FAC									2	0	0
MCA	1		0	0							
UCD / CDS	4		4	2							
DD				1							
Total	25	25	25	25	25	25	21	21	21	21	21

== Parishes ==
Orthophotomap of Mieres

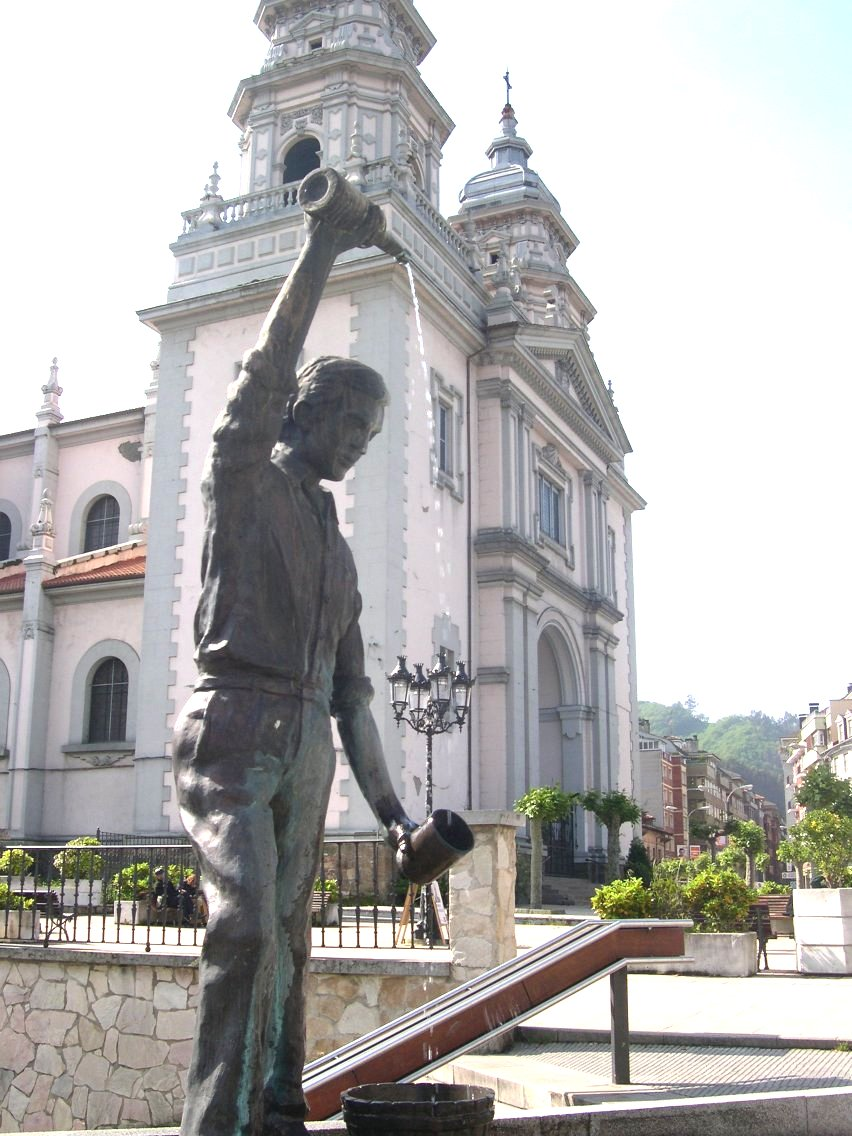
Requexu Square and St. John's Church

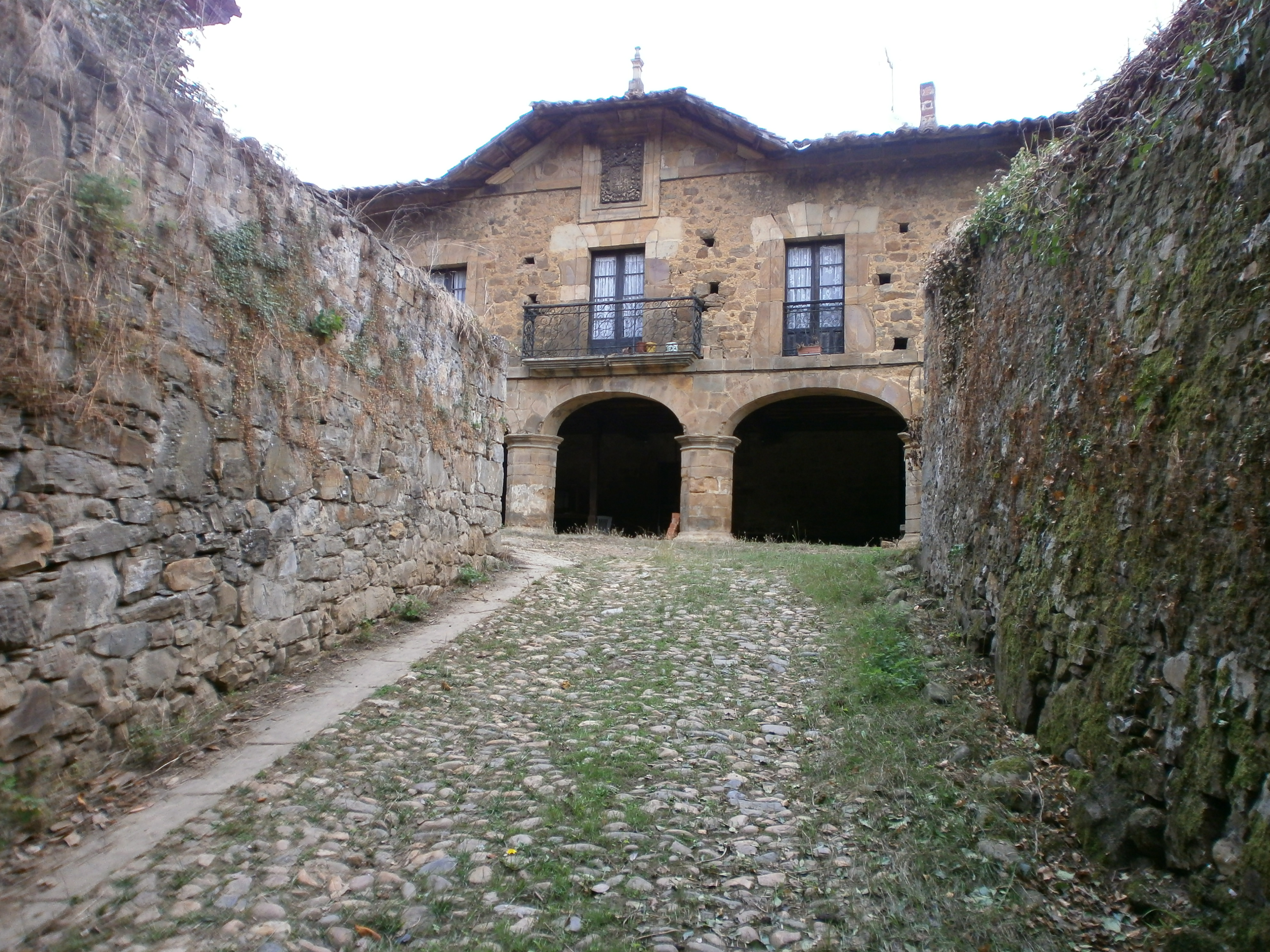
Palacio del Valletu

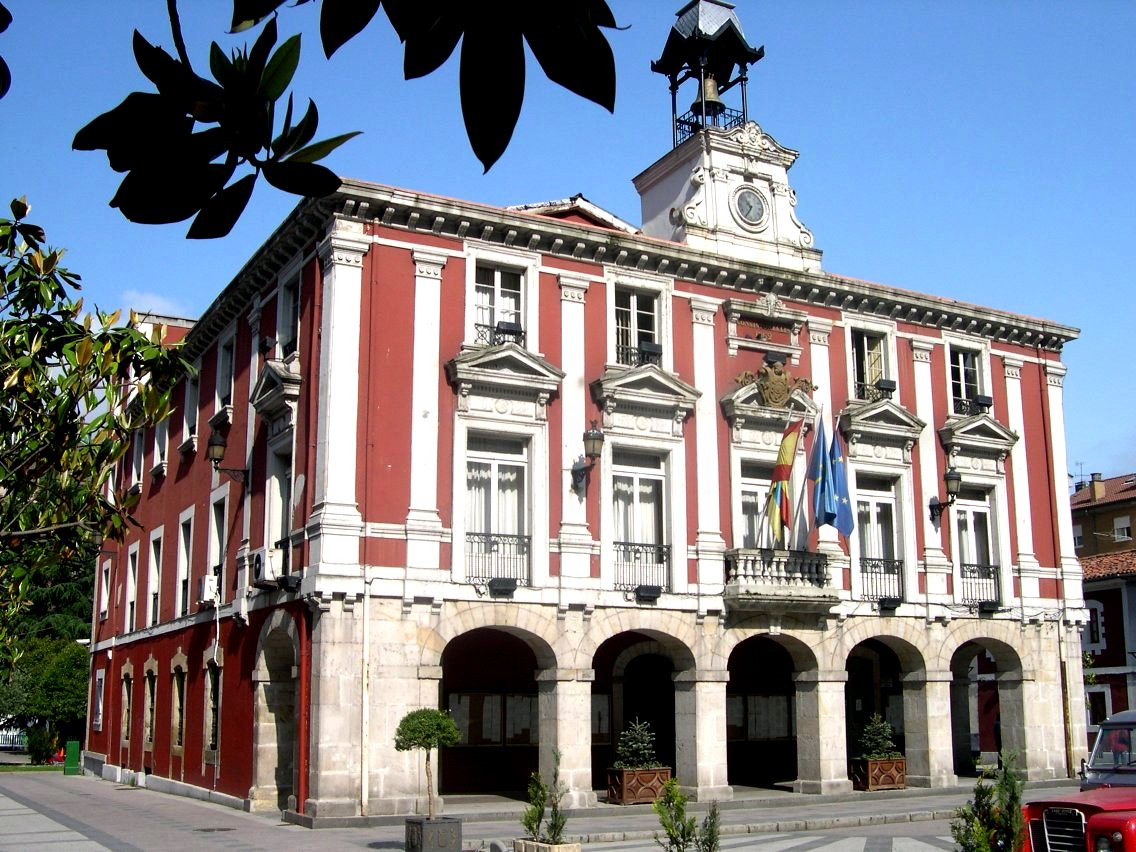
Town hall

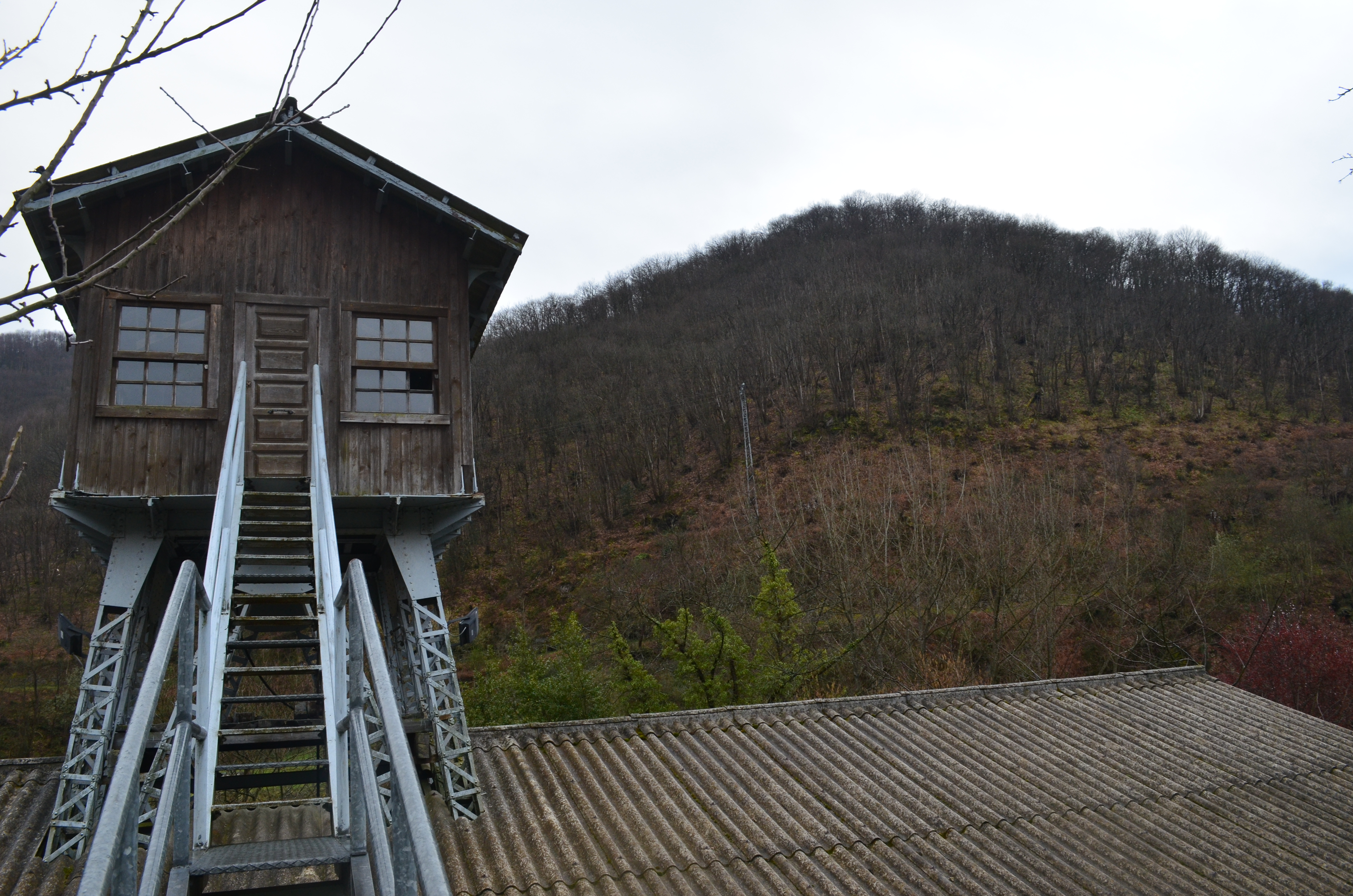
Espinos old mine

There are fifteen parishes:

- Baíña
- Figaredo
- Gallegos
- Loredo
- Mieres del Camino
- La Peña
- La Rebollada
- Santa Cruz
- Santa Rosa
- Santullano
- Turón
- Urbiés
- Ujo
- Seana
- Valdecuna

== Notable residents ==
- Juan Carlos Ablanedo, footballer
- Avelino Álvarez, footballer
- José Andrés, chef
- Vital Aza, author and playwright
- María Luisa García, chef, author of the bestselling cookbook of Asturian cuisine in history
- Innocencio of Mary Immaculate, saint
- Jenny, singer and representative of Andorra in the Eurovision Song Contest 2006
- Víctor Manuel, singer and songwriter
- Nacho Martínez, actor
- Xaviel Vilareyo, author

== Twin towns ==
- Karviná, Czech Republic
- San Miguel del Padrón, Cuba
- Amgala, Western Sahara
- Herstal, Belgium

== See also ==
- Church of Santa Eulalia de Ujo
- Premio de Novela Casino de Mieres
- List of municipalities in Asturias
