= Arama 36/37 =

Association for the Recovery of Asturian Military Architecture 1936–1937
- Abbreviation: Arama 36/37
- Type: NGO
- Purpose: Military history
- Headquarters: Avda. Fernández Ladreda, 48
- Location: Oviedo, Asturias
- Region served: Asturias
- Website: arama.org.es

ARAMA 36/37 (full name: Association for the Recovery of Asturian Military Architecture 1936–1937) is a non-governmental organization formed by historians of Military History to investigate the elements of military engineering related to the Spanish Civil War in the territory of Asturias (north of Spain), establishing criteria of conservation to safeguard them.
