= Cinema of Asturias =

The cinema of Asturias in Asturias, Spain, began in 1905 with the production of the first Asturian fiction film known as El robo de fruta (The Fruit Robbery). It was filmed by the Asturian film maker Javier Sánchez Manteola. This movie was filmed in Gijón (Asturias) and premiered in that city in the same year. It was shown in the old movie theater known as Salón Luminoso once located at Begoña Walk. In commemoration of this even the Asturian Film Festival was established in the year 2005.

== First projections ==
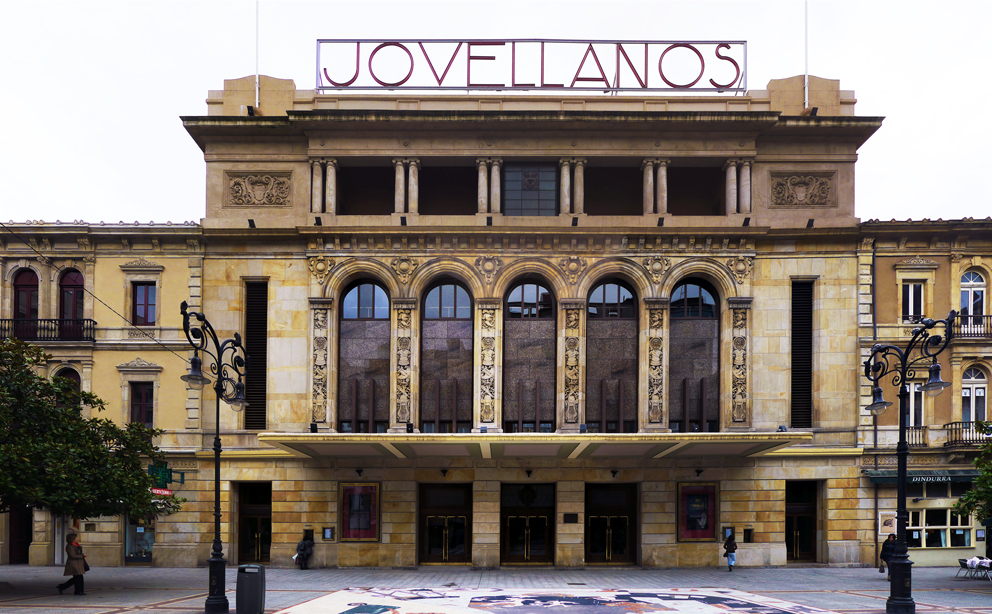
Jovellanos Theatre

Cinema started in Asturias seven months after its first public presentation in Paris in 1895. The new invention was taken to Asturias during the summer festival in Gijón. On Saturday 8 August 1896 the first film was projected.
