= Asturias =

Autonomous community and province of Spain

Asturias Asturies (Asturian)
- Autonomous community and province
- Principality of Asturias; Principado de Asturias (Spanish); Principáu d'Asturies (Asturian); Principao d'Asturias (Eonavian)
- Flag Coat of arms
- Motto: Hoc signo tuetur pius, Hoc signo vincitur inimicus ("By this sign is the pious safeguarded. By this sign is the enemy conquered.")
- Anthem: Asturias, patria querida (Spanish) / Asturies, patria querida (Asturian) "Asturias, beloved homeland"
- Location of Asturias (red) within Spain
- Interactive map of Asturias
- Coordinates: 43°21′41″N 5°50′52″W
- Country: Spain
- Formation: 722 (Kingdom of Asturias); 1230 (Comarca of the Asturias of Oviedo); 1833 (Province of Oviedo); 1982 (Autonomous Community)
- Statute of Autonomy: 1981
- Capital Largest city: Oviedo; Gijón
- Municipalities: 78

Government
  - Type: Devolved government in a constitutional monarchy
  - Body: Government of the Principality of Asturias
  - President: Adrián Barbón (FSA–PSOE)
  - Legislature: General Junta of the Principality of Asturias
  - Congress of Deputies: 7 Deputies (of 350)
  - Senate: 6 Senators (of 265)

Area
  - Total: 10,605.70 km^{2} (4,094.88 sq mi)
  - Rank: 10th in Spain (2.1%)

Population (2025)
  - Total: 1,015,128
  - Rank: 14th in Spain (2.1%)
  - Density: 95.71532/km^{2} (247.9015/sq mi)
- Demonym(s): Asturian asturiano, -na (es, gl) asturianu, -na (ast)

GDP
  - Total: €30.012 billion (2024)
  - Per capita: €29,568 (2024)
- Time zone: UTC+1 (CET)
- Area code: +34 985
- ISO 3166 code: ES-AS (autonomous community); ES-O (province)
- HDI (2025): 0.914 very high · 8th
- Official languages: Spanish
- Recognised languages: Asturian, Galician-Asturian
- Patron saint: Our Lady of Covadonga
- Website: asturias.es

Asturias, (Note: /æˈstʊəriəs, ə-/; Spanish: [asˈtuɾjas]; Asturian: Asturies [asˈtuɾjes; -ɾjɪs]) officially the Principality of Asturias, (Note: Spanish: Principado de Asturias; Asturian: Principáu d'Asturies; Galician–Asturian (Eonavian): Principao d'Asturias) is an autonomous community in northwestern Spain. It is coextensive with the province of Asturias and contains some of the territory that was part of the larger Kingdom of Asturias in the Middle Ages. Divided into eight comarcas (counties), the autonomous community of Asturias is bordered by Cantabria to the east, by León (Castile and León) to the south, by Lugo (Galicia) to the west, and by the Cantabrian Sea to the north. With a population of about 1 million, it is one of the least populous autonomous communities of Spain.

Asturias is situated along the Atlantic Ocean in the North, spreading to a mountainous setting with vast greenery and lush vegetation, making it part of Green Spain. The region has a maritime climate. It receives plenty of annual rainfall and little sunshine by Spanish standards and has very moderate seasons, most often averaging in the lower 20s Celsius. Heat waves are rare due to mountains blocking southerly winds. Winters are very mild for the latitude, especially near sea level.

The most important cities are the communal capital, Oviedo, the seaport and largest city Gijón, and the industrial town of Avilés. Other municipalities in Asturias include Cangas de Onís, Cangas del Narcea, Gozón, Grado, Langreo, Llanera, Laviana, Lena, Llanes, Mieres, Siero, Valdés, Vegadeo and Villaviciosa (see also List of municipalities and comarcas in Asturias).

== History ==
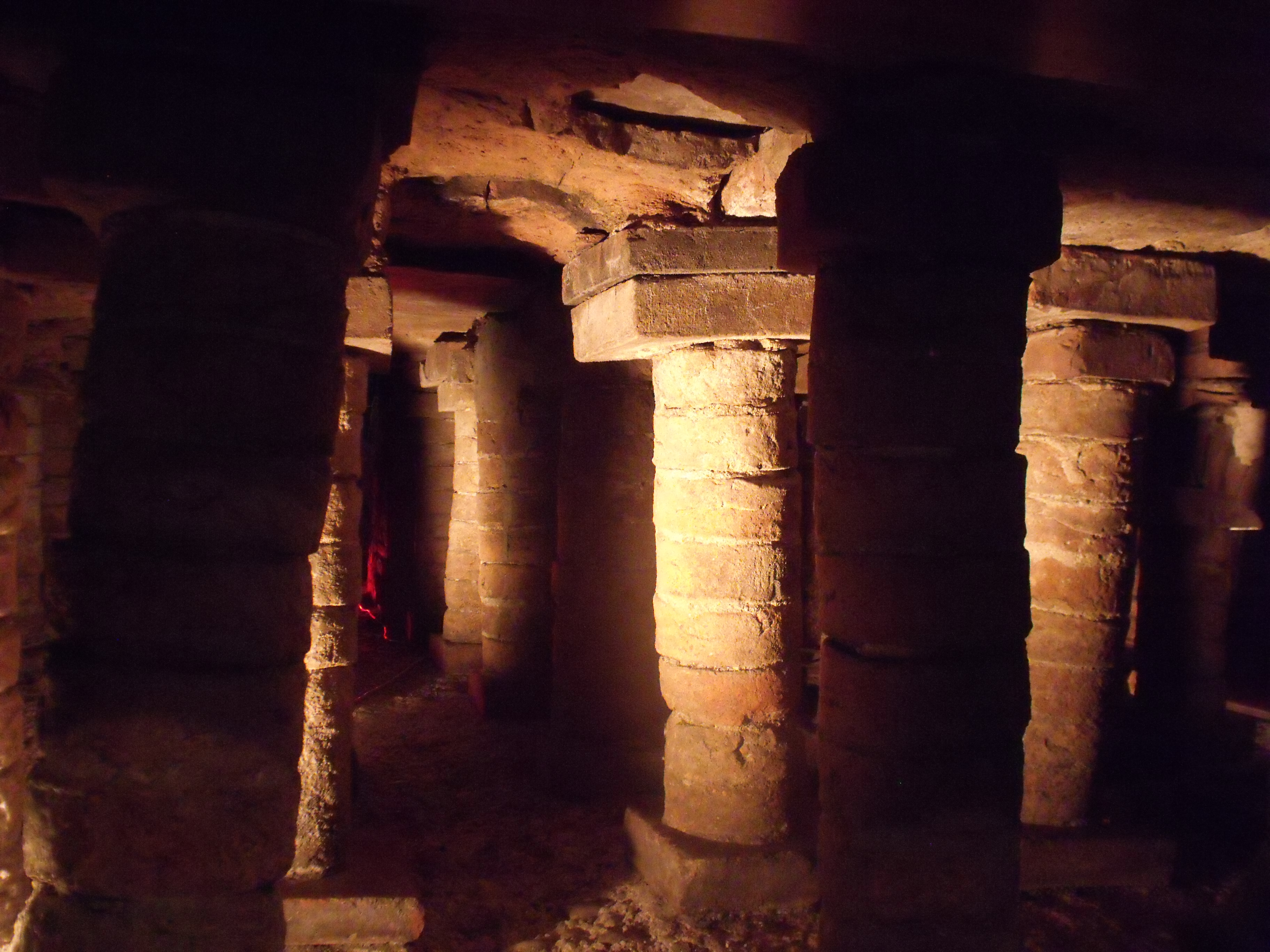
Roman thermae in Gijón

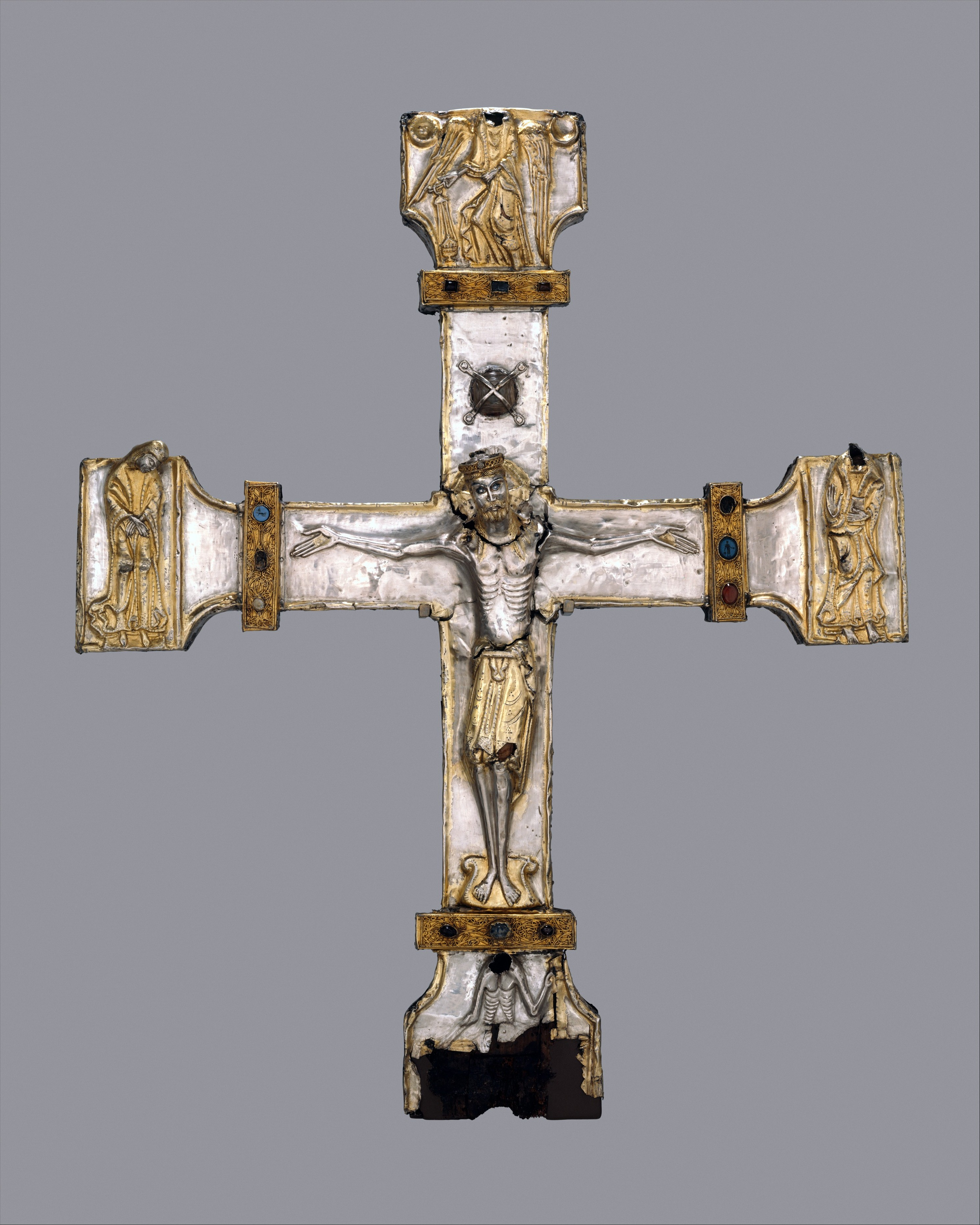
Processional Cross, c. 1150–1175. It comes from a 12th-century church fifty miles east of Oviedo. Metropolitan Museum of Art.

Asturias was inhabited first by Homo erectus, then by Neanderthals. Since the Lower Paleolithic era, and during the Upper Paleolithic, Asturias was characterized by cave paintings in the eastern part of the area. In the Mesolithic period, a native culture developed, that of the Asturiense, and later, with the introduction of the Bronze Age, megaliths and tumuli were constructed. In the Iron Age, the territory came under the cultural influence of the Celts; the local Celtic peoples, known as the Astures, were composed of tribes such as the Luggones, the Pesicos, and others, who populated the entire area with castros (fortified hill towns). Today the Astur Celtic influence persists in place names, such as those of rivers and mountains.

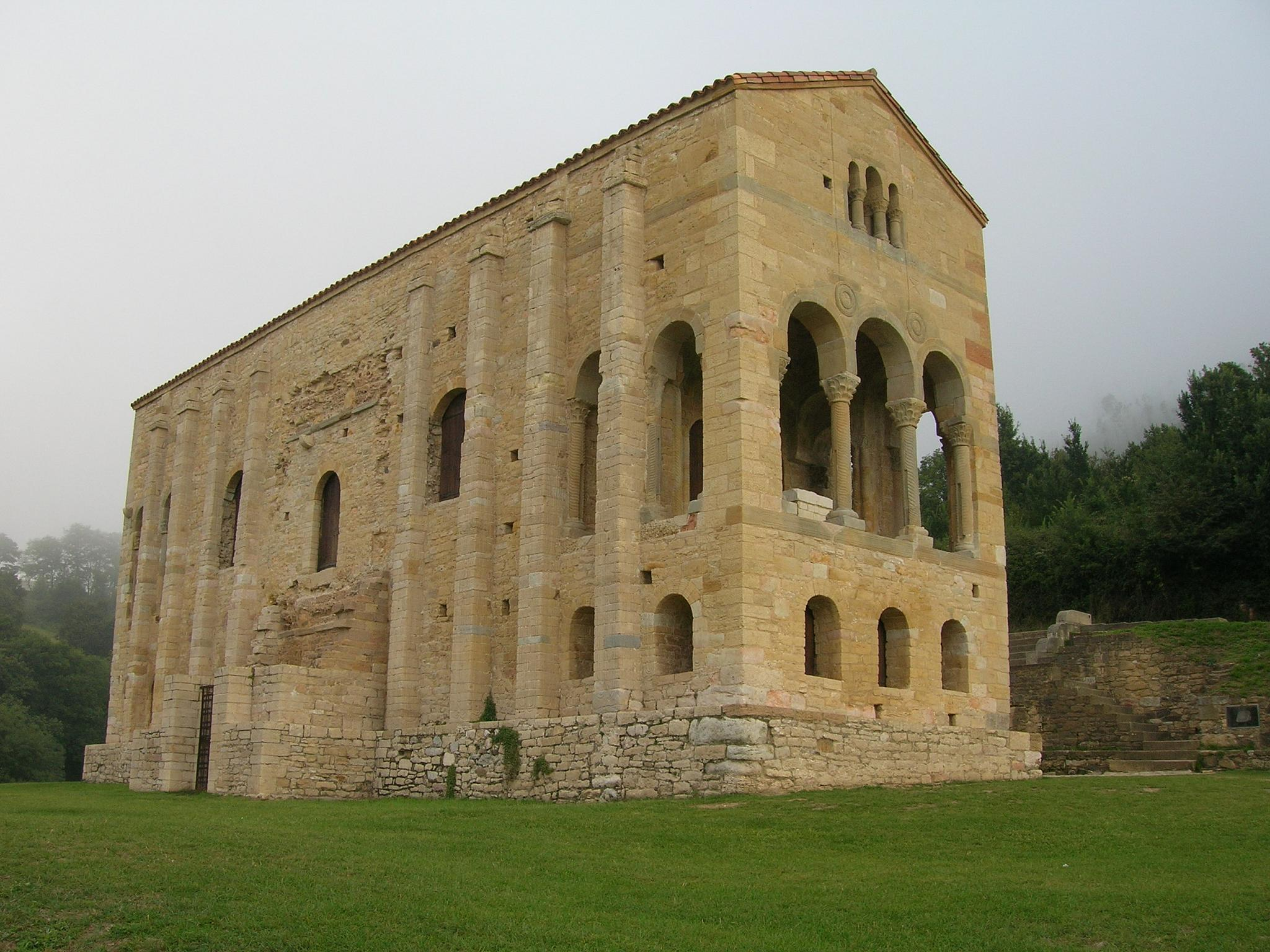
Santa María del Naranco, ancient palace of Asturian kings, 842 AD. Many churches in Asturias are among the oldest churches of Europe, dating to the Early Middle Ages.

With the conquest of Asturias by the Romans under Augustus (29–19 BC), the region entered into recorded history. The Astures were subdued by the Romans, but were never fully conquered. After several centuries without foreign presence, they enjoyed a brief revival during the Germanic invasions of the late 4th century AD, resisting Suebi and Visigoth raids throughout the 5th century AD, ending with the Moorish invasion of Spain. However, as it had been for the Romans and Visigoths, the Moors did not find mountainous territory easy to conquer, and the lands along Spain's northern coast never became part of Islamic Spain. With the beginning of the Moorish conquest in the 8th century, this region became a refuge for Christian nobles, and in 722, a de facto independent kingdom was established, the Regnum Asturorum, which was to become the cradle of the incipient Reconquista (Reconquest).

In the 10th century, the Kingdom of Asturias gave way to the Kingdom of León, and during the Middle Ages the geographic isolation of the territory made historical references scarce. Through the rebellion of Prince Henry (the later Henry II of Castile) in the 14th century, the Principality of Asturias was established. The most famous proponents of independence were Gonzalo Peláez and Queen Urraca, who, while achieving significant victories, were ultimately defeated by Castilian troops. After its integration into the Kingdom of Spain, Asturias provided the Spanish court with high-ranking aristocrats and played an important role in the colonisation of America. Since 1388, the heir to the Castilian (later Spanish) throne has been styled Prince (or Princess) of Asturias. In the 16th century, the population reached 100,000 for the first time, and within another century that number would double due to the arrival of American corn.

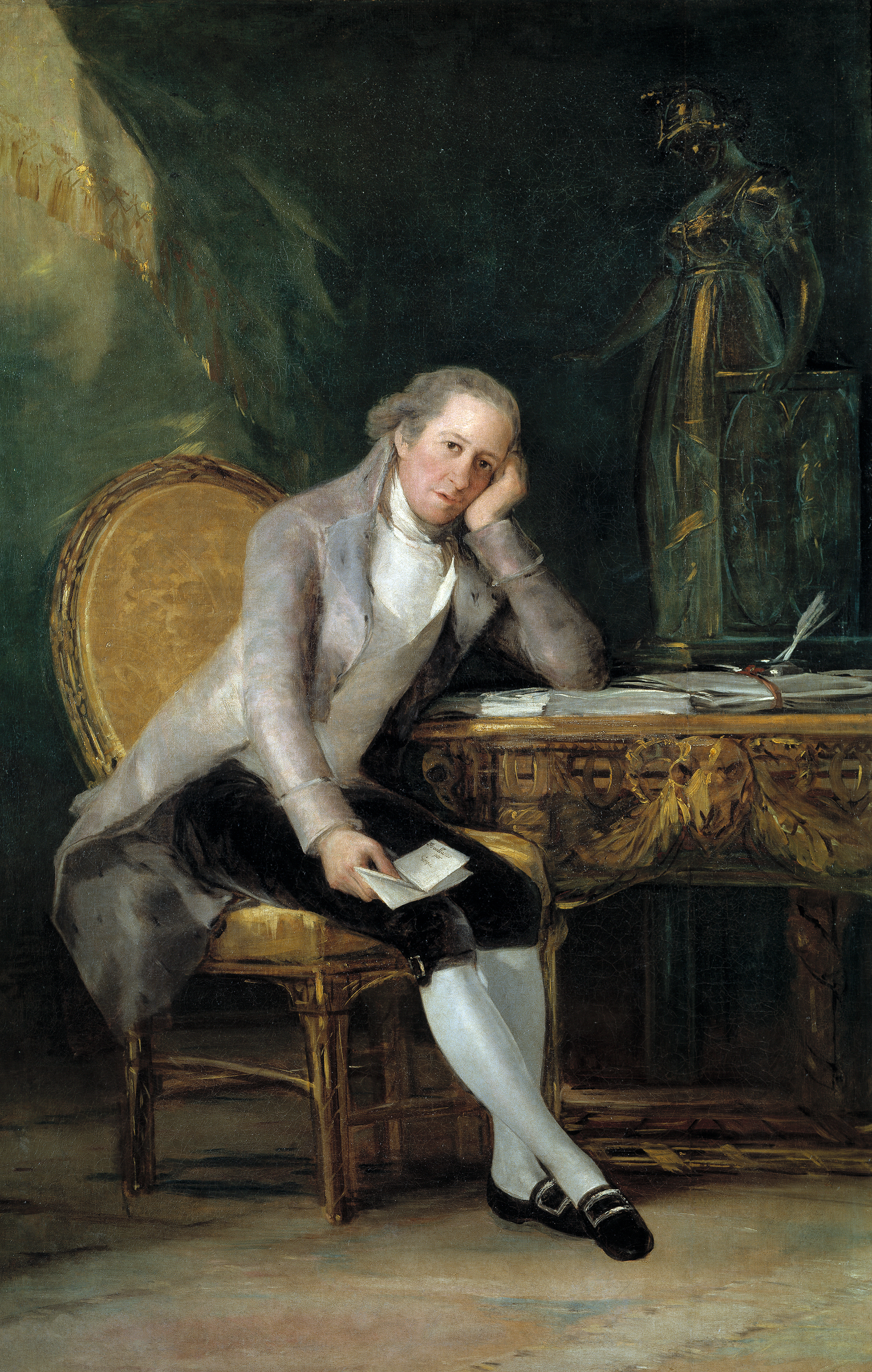
Gaspar Melchor de Jovellanos

In the 18th century, Asturias was one of the centres of the Spanish Enlightenment. The renowned Galician thinker Benito de Feijóo settled in the Benedictine Monastery of San Vicente de Oviedo. Gaspar Melchor de Jovellanos, a polymath and prominent reformer and politician of the late 18th century, was born in the seaside town of Gijón.

During the Napoleonic Wars, Asturias was the first Spanish province to rise up against the French following the abdication of King Ferdinand VII on 10 May 1808. Riots began in Oviedo and on 25 May the local government formally declared war on Napoleon with 18,000 men called to arms to resist invasion.

The Industrial Revolution came to Asturias after 1830 with the discovery and systematic exploitation of coal mines and iron factories at the mining basins of Nalón and Caudal. At the same time, there was significant migration to the Americas (especially Argentina, Uruguay, Puerto Rico, Cuba and Mexico); those who succeeded overseas often returned to their native land much wealthier. These entrepreneurs were known collectively as Indianos, for having visited and made their fortunes in the West Indies and beyond. The heritage of these wealthy families can still be seen in Asturias today: the region is dotted with many large modernista villas, as well as cultural institutions such as free schools and public libraries.

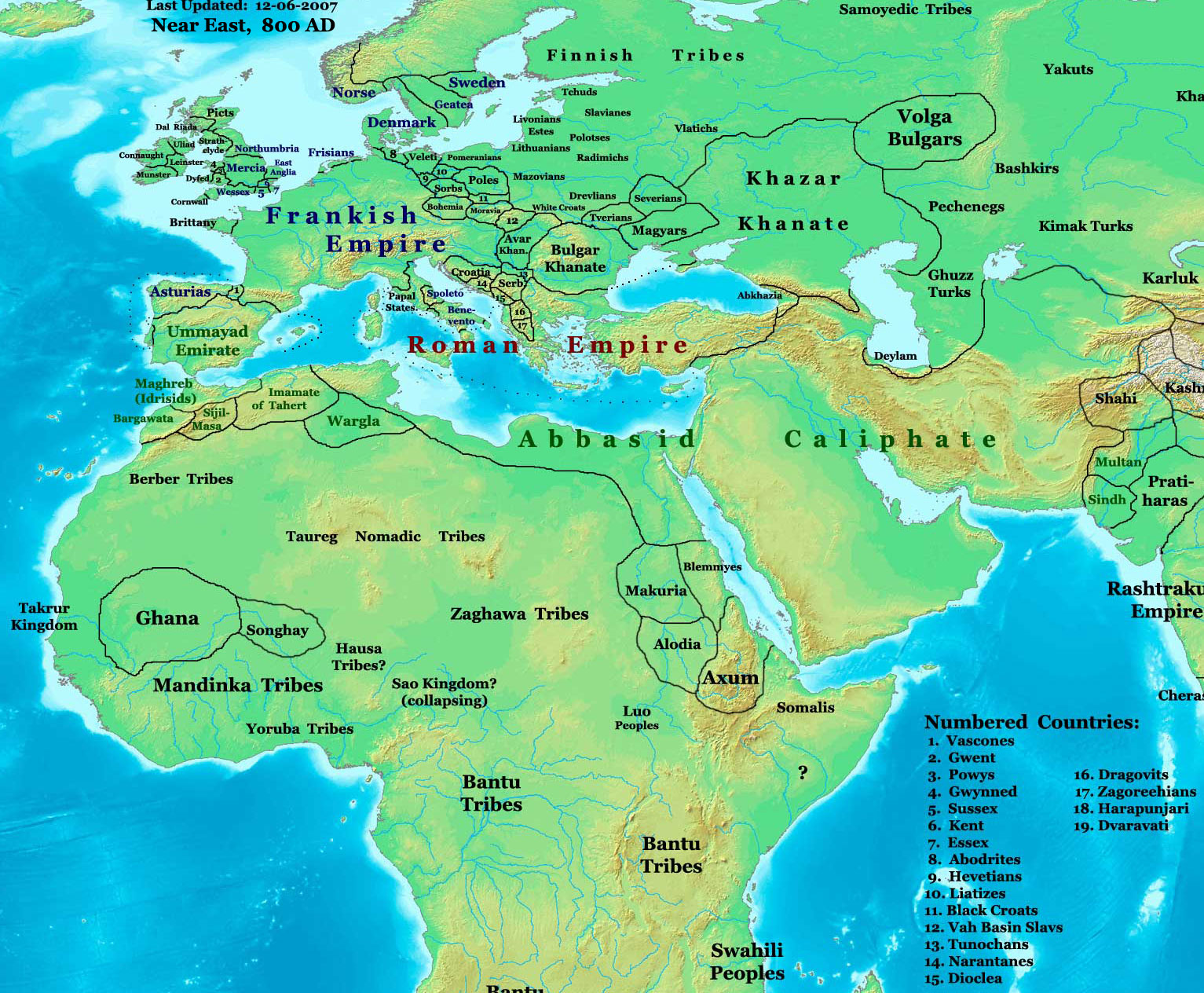
Location of Asturias and its neighbors in 800 AD

Asturias played an important part in the events that led up to the Spanish Civil War. In October 1934, Asturian miners and other workers staged an armed uprising (see Revolution of Asturias) to oppose the coming to power of the right-wing CEDA party, which had obtained three ministerial posts in the centralist government of the Second Spanish Republic. For a month, a Popular Front Committee exercised control in southern Asturias, while local workers committees sprang up elsewhere in the region. A defense committee led by anarcho-syndicalist supporters took power in Oviedo. Troops under the command of a then-unknown general named Francisco Franco Bahamonde were brought from Spanish Morocco to suppress the revolt. Franco applied tactics normally reserved for overseas colonies, using troops of the Spanish Legion and Moroccan troops; ferocious oppression followed.

As a result, Asturias remained loyal to the republican government during the Spanish Civil War, and was the scene of an extraordinary defence in extreme terrain, the Battle of El Mazuco. With Franco eventually gaining control of all of Spain, Asturias – traditionally linked to the Spanish Crown – was known merely as the "Province of Oviedo" from 1939 until Franco's death in 1975. The province's name was restored fully after the return of democracy to Spain in 1977. In the 1950s and 60s the industrial progress of Asturias continued with the constitution of national enterprises like Ensidesa and Hunosa, but the 1980s was the decade of a dramatic industrial restructuring.

On 30 December 1981, Asturias became an autonomous community within the decentralised territorial structure established by the Constitution of 1978. Rafael Luis Fernández Álvarez, who had previously served as the president of the Regional Council since 1978, became the first president of the Principality of Asturias, upon the adoption of autonomy. The Asturian regional government holds comprehensive competencies in important areas such as health, education and protection of the environment. The current president, elected in 2019, is Adrián Barbón (PSOE).

== Geography ==
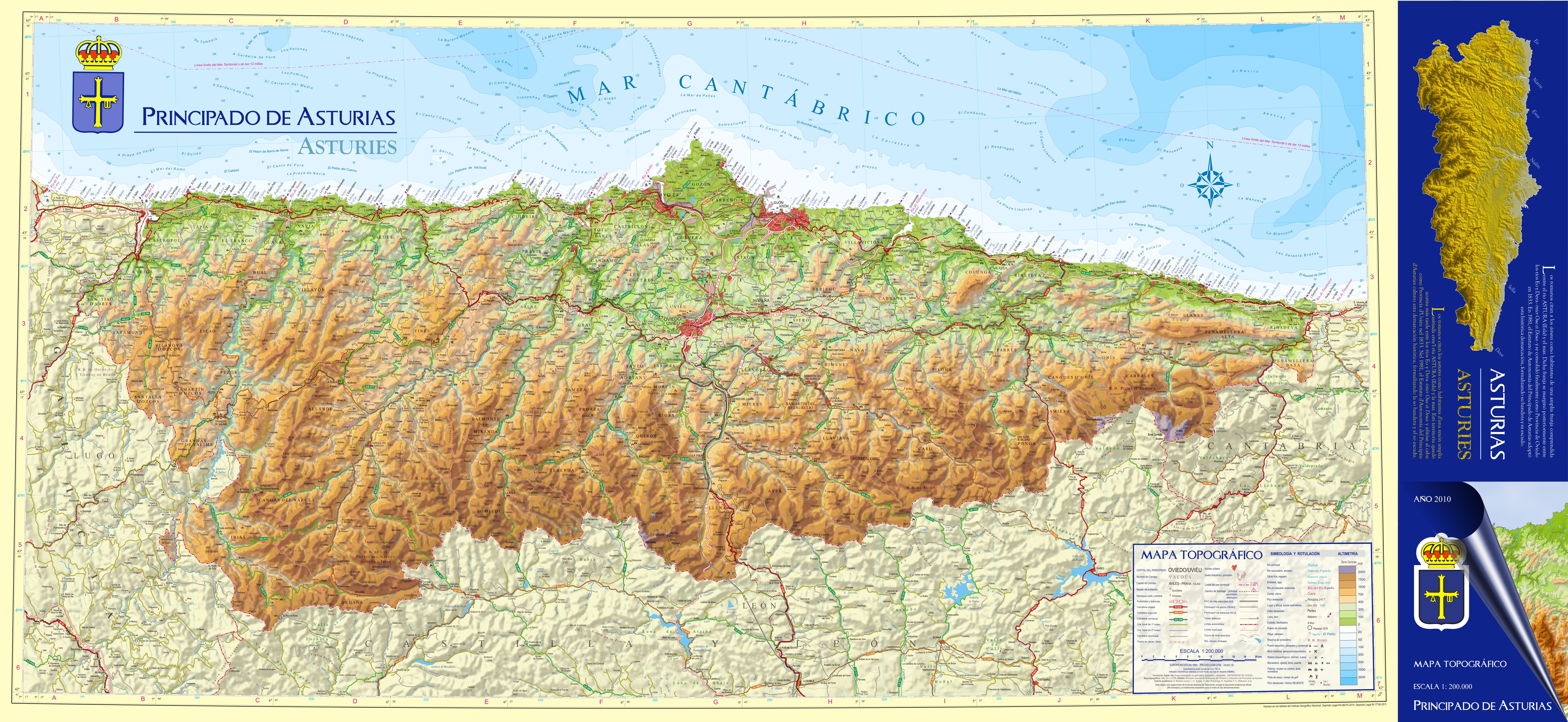
Map of Asturias

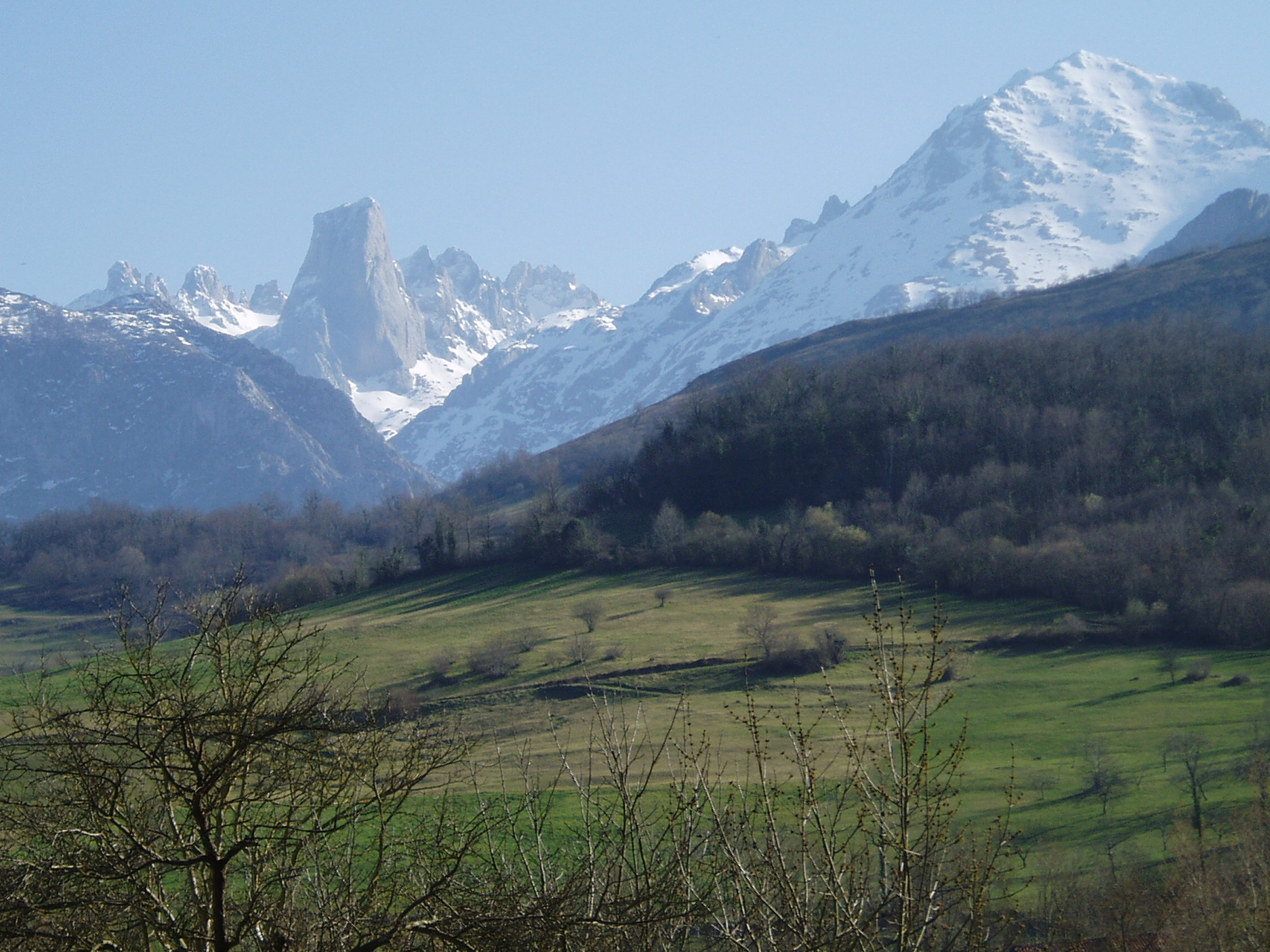
Picu Urriellu in the Urrieles Massif

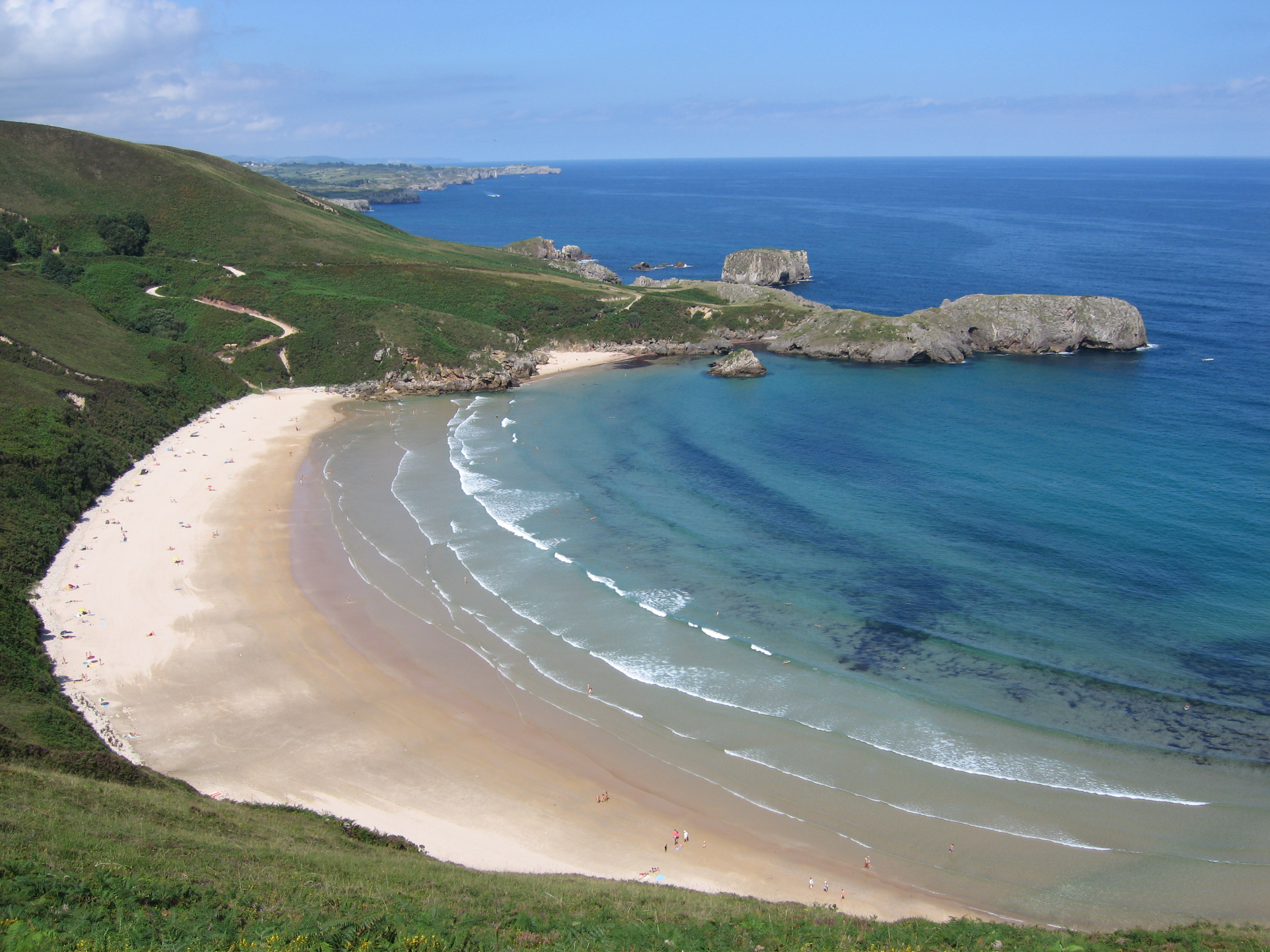
Torimbia beach, Llanes

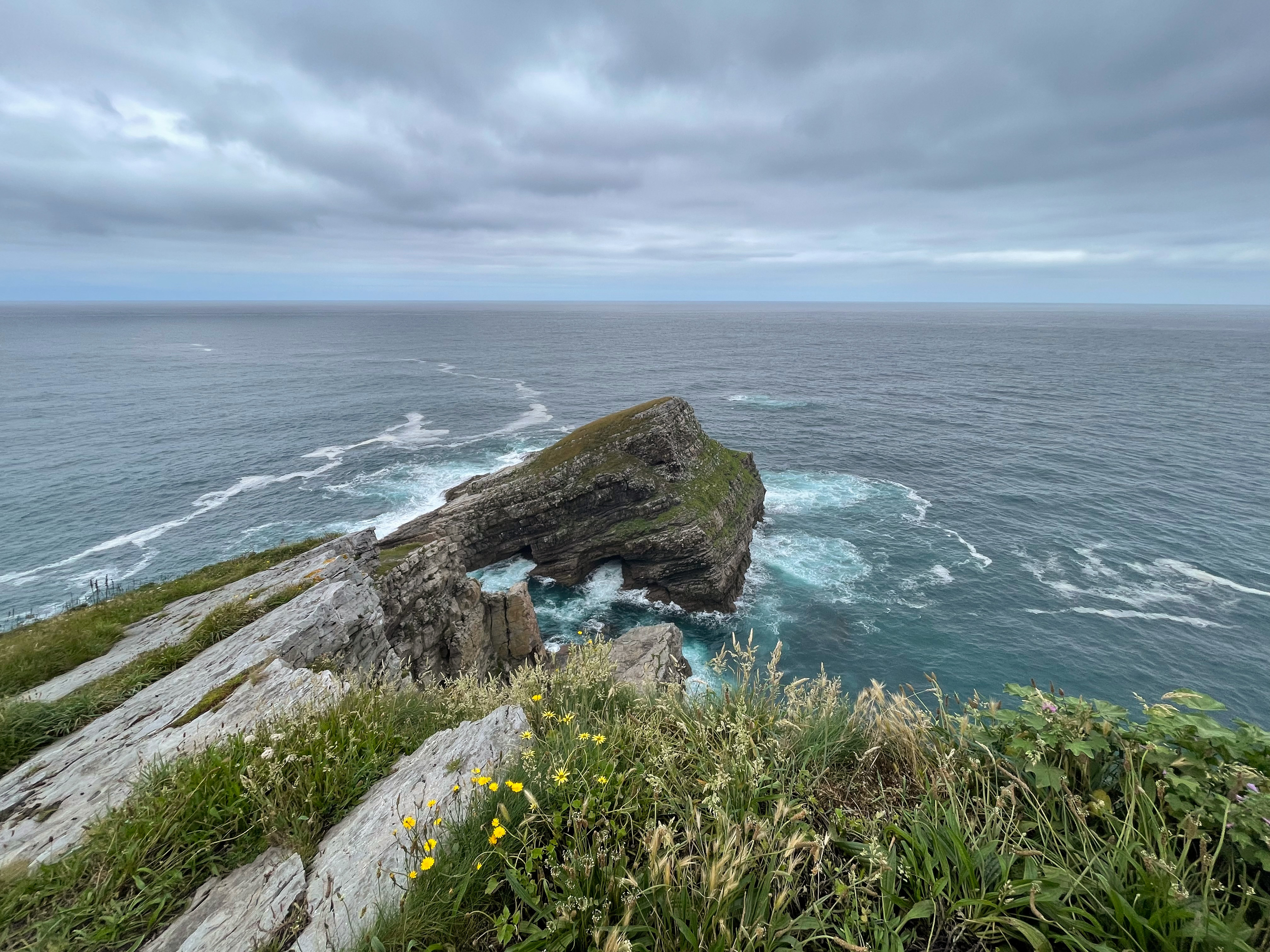
Cape Vidio, Cudillero

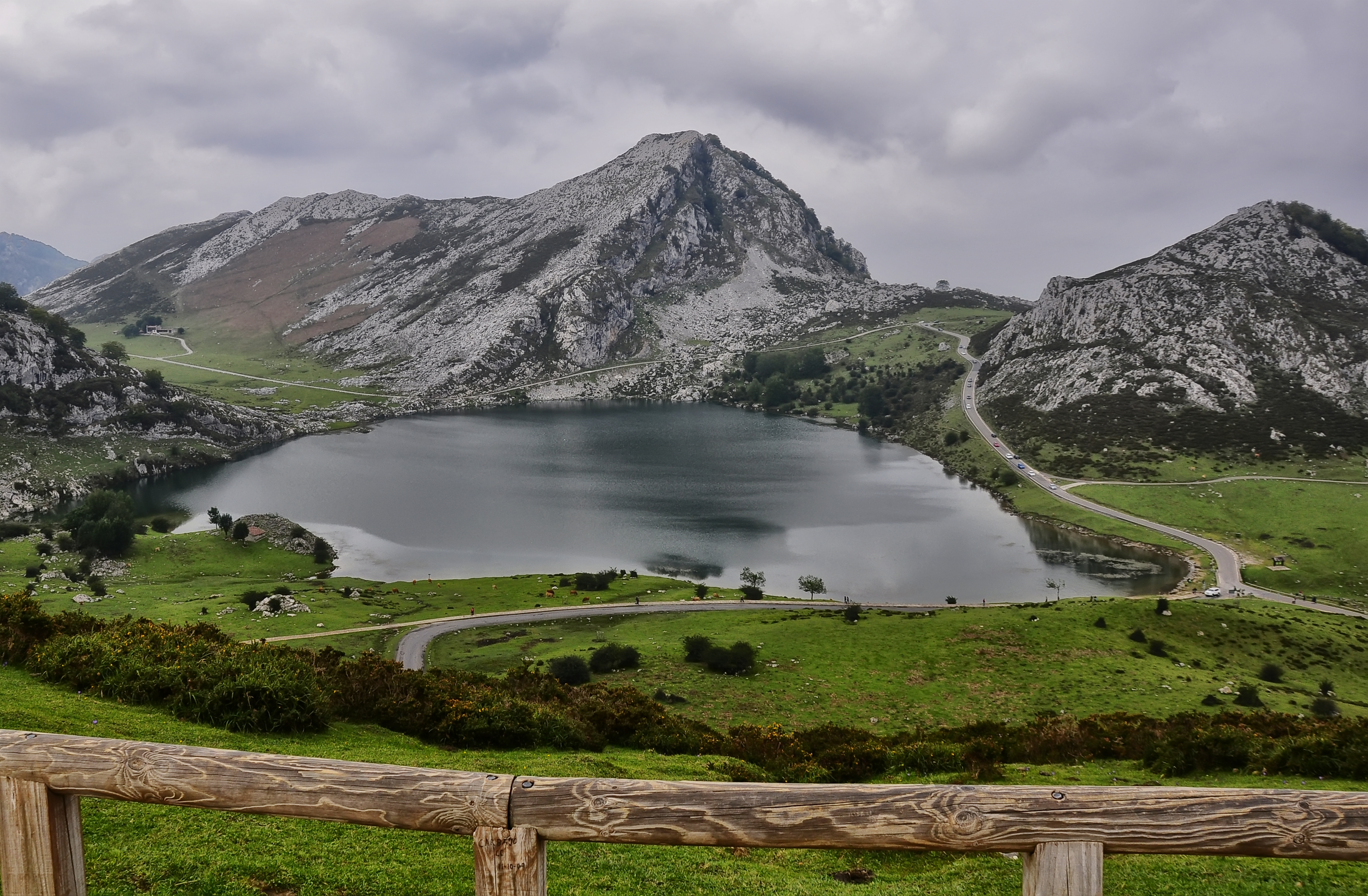
Lakes of Covadonga in Picos de Europa

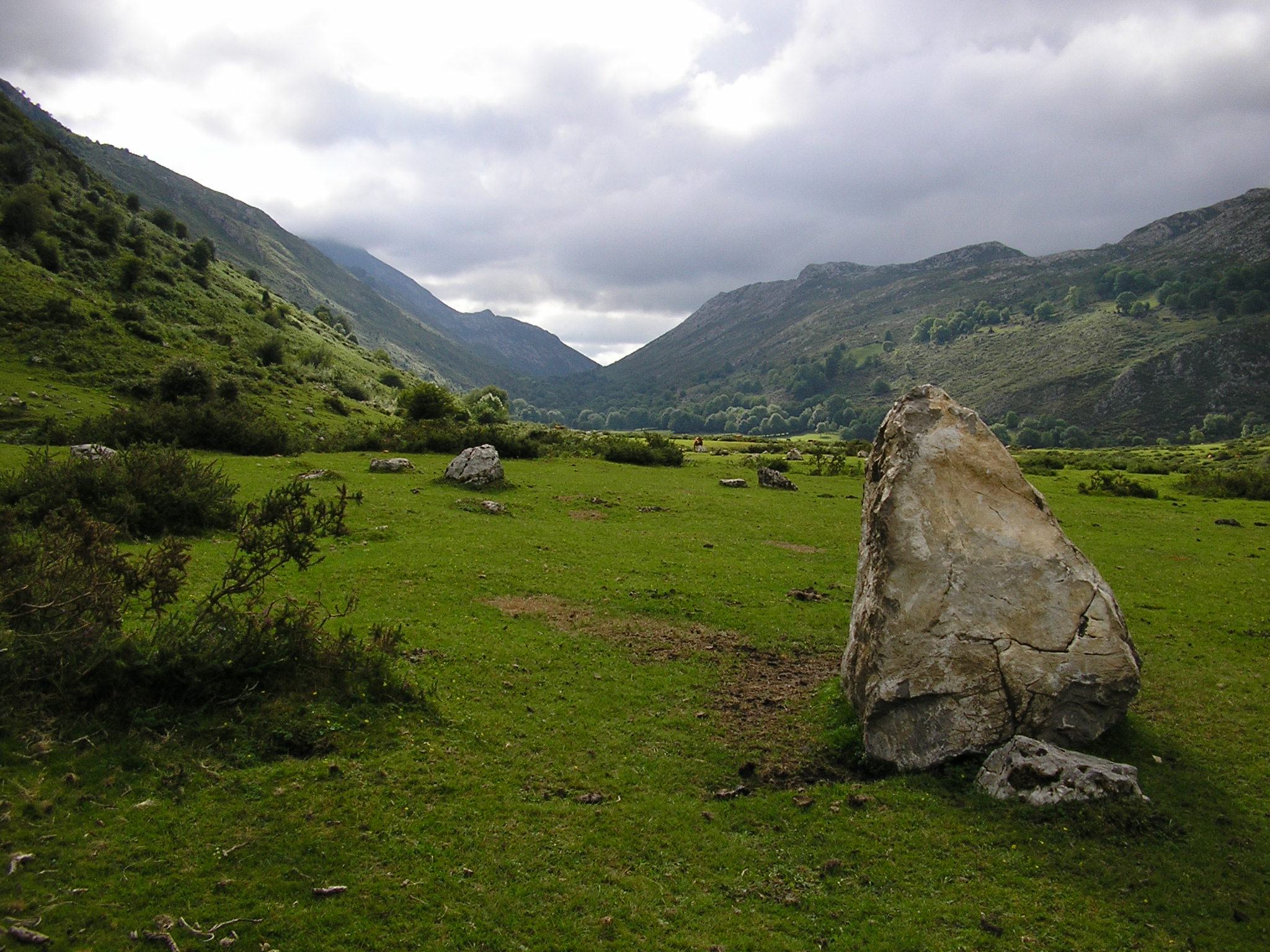
Llosa de Viango

The Cantabrian Mountains (Cordillera Cantábrica) form Asturias's natural border with the province of León to the south. In the eastern range, the Picos de Europa National Park contains the highest and arguably most spectacular mountains, rising to 2,648 metres (8,688 ft) at the Torrecerredo peak. Other notable features of this predominantly limestone range are the Parque Natural de Redes in the central east, the central Ubiñas south of Oviedo, and the Parque Natural de Somiedo in the west. The Cantabrian mountains offer opportunities for activities such as climbing, walking, skiing and caving, and extend some 200 kilometres (120 mi) in total, as far as Galicia province to the west of Asturias and Cantabria province to the east. Similar opportunities are available for the interested traveler of Asturias in Caldoveiro Peak.

The Asturian coastline is extensive, with hundreds of beaches, coves and natural sea caves. Notable examples include the Playa del Silencio (Beach of Silence) near the fishing village of Cudillero (west of Gijón), as well as the many beaches surrounding the summer resort of Llanes, such as the Barro, Ballota and Torimbia (the latter a predominantly nudist beach). Most of Asturias's beaches are sandy, clean, and bordered by steep cliffs, on top of which it is not unusual to see grazing livestock.

The key features of Asturian geography are its rugged coastal cliffs and the mountainous interior.

=== Climate ===
The climate of Asturias is heavily marked by the Gulf Stream. Falling within the Cantabrian belt known as Green Spain it has high precipitations all year round. Summers are mild and, on the coast, winters also have relatively benign temperatures, rarely including frost. The cold is especially felt in the mountains, where snow is present from October till May. Both rain and snow are regular weather features of Asturian winters. In coastal or near-coastal areas, daytime high temperatures generally average around 12 °C (54 °F) – 13 °C (55 °F) during winter and 22 °C (72 °F) – 23 °C (73 °F) in summer.

Climate data for Oviedo 336m (1981–2010)
Month	Jan	Feb	Mar	Apr	May	Jun	Jul	Aug	Sep	Oct	Nov	Dec	Year
Record high °C (°F)	22.0 (71.6)	24.6 (76.3)	26.8 (80.2)	31.5 (88.7)	32.0 (89.6)	35.5 (95.9)	35.0 (95.0)	35.6 (96.1)	36.4 (97.5)	31.7 (89.1)	26.6 (79.9)	23.0 (73.4)	36.4 (97.5)
Mean daily maximum °C (°F)	12.0 (53.6)	12.7 (54.9)	14.9 (58.8)	15.7 (60.3)	18.2 (64.8)	20.9 (69.6)	22.8 (73.0)	23.3 (73.9)	22.1 (71.8)	18.7 (65.7)	14.6 (58.3)	12.4 (54.3)	17.4 (63.3)
Daily mean °C (°F)	8.3 (46.9)	8.7 (47.7)	10.5 (50.9)	11.3 (52.3)	13.9 (57.0)	16.7 (62.1)	18.7 (65.7)	19.1 (66.4)	17.6 (63.7)	14.6 (58.3)	10.9 (51.6)	8.9 (48.0)	13.3 (55.9)
Mean daily minimum °C (°F)	4.6 (40.3)	4.7 (40.5)	6.1 (43.0)	6.8 (44.2)	9.5 (49.1)	12.4 (54.3)	14.5 (58.1)	14.8 (58.6)	13.1 (55.6)	10.4 (50.7)	7.2 (45.0)	5.3 (41.5)	9.1 (48.4)
Record low °C (°F)	−6.0 (21.2)	−3.8 (25.2)	−3.6 (25.5)	−0.5 (31.1)	1.6 (34.9)	5.6 (42.1)	7.4 (45.3)	8.6 (47.5)	5.2 (41.4)	2.4 (36.3)	−4.2 (24.4)	−3.6 (25.5)	−6.0 (21.2)
Average precipitation mm (inches)	84 (3.3)	81 (3.2)	78 (3.1)	100 (3.9)	82 (3.2)	57 (2.2)	45 (1.8)	56 (2.2)	66 (2.6)	99 (3.9)	115 (4.5)	99 (3.9)	960 (37.8)
Average precipitation days (≥ 1 mm)	11	10	10	12	12	8	7	8	8	11	12	12	122
Average relative humidity (%)	76	75	74	76	78	79	79	80	78	79	79	77	78
Mean monthly sunshine hours	115	122	153	161	167	167	177	176	167	138	109	105	1,756
Source: Agencia Estatal de Meteorología

Climate data for Gijón (1971–2000)
Month	Jan	Feb	Mar	Apr	May	Jun	Jul	Aug	Sep	Oct	Nov	Dec	Year
Record high °C (°F)	23.6 (74.5)	23.0 (73.4)	27.0 (80.6)	28.0 (82.4)	31.8 (89.2)	36.4 (97.5)	31.4 (88.5)	30.0 (86.0)	34.6 (94.3)	30.4 (86.7)	26.1 (79.0)	25.0 (77.0)	36.4 (97.5)
Mean daily maximum °C (°F)	13.1 (55.6)	13.8 (56.8)	14.9 (58.8)	15.6 (60.1)	17.8 (64.0)	20.2 (68.4)	22.4 (72.3)	23.2 (73.8)	21.8 (71.2)	19.0 (66.2)	15.6 (60.1)	14.0 (57.2)	17.6 (63.7)
Daily mean °C (°F)	8.9 (48.0)	9.6 (49.3)	10.7 (51.3)	11.8 (53.2)	14.3 (57.7)	16.9 (62.4)	19.2 (66.6)	19.7 (67.5)	17.9 (64.2)	15.0 (59.0)	11.6 (52.9)	9.9 (49.8)	13.8 (56.8)
Mean daily minimum °C (°F)	4.7 (40.5)	5.4 (41.7)	6.6 (43.9)	8.1 (46.6)	10.9 (51.6)	13.6 (56.5)	16.0 (60.8)	16.2 (61.2)	14.1 (57.4)	11.0 (51.8)	7.6 (45.7)	5.8 (42.4)	10.0 (50.0)
Record low °C (°F)	−4.6 (23.7)	−4.0 (24.8)	−2.0 (28.4)	0.4 (32.7)	3.2 (37.8)	5.8 (42.4)	8.6 (47.5)	8.2 (46.8)	5.0 (41.0)	2.6 (36.7)	−1.4 (29.5)	−4.8 (23.4)	−4.8 (23.4)
Average precipitation mm (inches)	94 (3.7)	85 (3.3)	74 (2.9)	93 (3.7)	79 (3.1)	47 (1.9)	45 (1.8)	54 (2.1)	70 (2.8)	104 (4.1)	120 (4.7)	104 (4.1)	971 (38.2)
Average precipitation days (≥ 1 mm)	12	11	10	12	11	7	6	7	8	11	12	12	121
Mean monthly sunshine hours	103	109	137	151	167	180	194	190	158	132	106	92	1,721
Source: Agencia Estatal de Meteorología

Climate data for Avilés—Asturias Airport (1981–2010)
Month	Jan	Feb	Mar	Apr	May	Jun	Jul	Aug	Sep	Oct	Nov	Dec	Year
Record high °C (°F)	23.5 (74.3)	24.3 (75.7)	26.7 (80.1)	28.6 (83.5)	33.6 (92.5)	36.0 (96.8)	33.0 (91.4)	31.6 (88.9)	36.0 (96.8)	31.0 (87.8)	25.6 (78.1)	25.6 (78.1)	36.0 (96.8)
Mean daily maximum °C (°F)	12.9 (55.2)	13.1 (55.6)	14.6 (58.3)	15.1 (59.2)	17.3 (63.1)	19.6 (67.3)	21.5 (70.7)	22.2 (72.0)	21.2 (70.2)	18.7 (65.7)	15.3 (59.5)	13.3 (55.9)	17.1 (62.8)
Daily mean °C (°F)	9.4 (48.9)	9.4 (48.9)	10.7 (51.3)	11.3 (52.3)	13.6 (56.5)	16.2 (61.2)	18.2 (64.8)	18.8 (65.8)	17.4 (63.3)	15.1 (59.2)	11.8 (53.2)	9.9 (49.8)	13.5 (56.3)
Mean daily minimum °C (°F)	5.9 (42.6)	5.7 (42.3)	6.8 (44.2)	7.5 (45.5)	10.0 (50.0)	12.8 (55.0)	14.8 (58.6)	15.3 (59.5)	13.7 (56.7)	11.3 (52.3)	8.4 (47.1)	6.5 (43.7)	9.9 (49.8)
Record low °C (°F)	−3.0 (26.6)	−2.6 (27.3)	−2.4 (27.7)	−0.6 (30.9)	2.0 (35.6)	5.6 (42.1)	8.0 (46.4)	8.4 (47.1)	6.5 (43.7)	3.0 (37.4)	−0.8 (30.6)	−3.0 (26.6)	−3.0 (26.6)
Average precipitation mm (inches)	103 (4.1)	88 (3.5)	82 (3.2)	99 (3.9)	79 (3.1)	61 (2.4)	47 (1.9)	60 (2.4)	73 (2.9)	116 (4.6)	134 (5.3)	117 (4.6)	1,062 (41.8)
Mean monthly sunshine hours	98	109	142	151	166	163	173	182	170	130	96	76	1,670
Source: Agencia Estatal de Meteorología

=== Pollution and conservation ===
The Gijón area was marked and singled out as one of the pollution hotspots in Western Europe in a 2015 report from the International Institute for Applied Science Systems, where predictions for 2030 conditions were made. Gijón was marked much higher than any other Spanish metro area, in spite of the much larger populations in cities such as Madrid and Barcelona. This was attributed to heavy industrial activities. Since outdoor air pollution is a major cause of premature death in Europe, the excessive pollution is a major concern for Asturias. The majority of Asturias population live within a 25-kilometre (16 mi) range from the port of Gijón, so pollution would be likely to heavily affect the population.

A Spanish government study conducted in 2010 regarding life expectancy in relative communities, Asturias was ranked lowest (tied with Andalucia) for male life expectancy with 76.7 years from 2007 readings. However, female life expectancy was 84 years and normal among autonomous communities. However, even the male life expectancy is only just below Western European standards, and exaggerated by the high Spanish life expectancy. Considering that many Asturians live in relatively close proximity to Gijón's heavily industrial areas, these figures (especially for female relative health) still contribute to a position that Gijón is a safe location to live. The numbers for "disability-free" life expectancy has risen significantly both for males and females in the area since 1986, according to the report.

The coal fired electric generating plant, Aboño, completed a Spanish government/EU demand to install equipment to drastically reduce its emissions. Also, the other two major polluters - Arcelor Gijón and Arcelor Avilés - have announced an investment of 100 million euros to do the same. These factories have been a major cause of the area's high airborne pollution.

=== Air pollution ===
Asturias was the Spanish autonomous community with the highest emissions of polluting gases per inhabitant, according to a 2018 article citing a report by the Observatorio de la Sostenibilidad based on 2016 data. Industries in the Principality emitted 21.3 tonnes of carbon dioxide per person. The concentration of coal-fired power stations and heavy industry contributed to its position, while the Aboño thermal power plant and the ArcelorMittal steelworks in Avilés together accounted for most of the region's carbon dioxide emissions.

== Demographics ==
Historical population
Year	Pop.	±%
1842	451,604	—
1857	524,529	+16.1%
1877	597,346	+13.9%
1887	615,844	+3.1%
1900	637,801	+3.6%
1910	709,764	+11.3%
1920	779,294	+9.8%
1930	834,553	+7.1%
1940	869,488	+4.2%
1950	895,804	+3.0%
1960	994,670	+11.0%
1970	1,052,048	+5.8%
1981	1,129,556	+7.4%
1991	1,093,937	−3.2%
2001	1,062,998	−2.8%
2011	1,075,183	+1.1%
2021	1,012,117	−5.9%
Source: INE

As of 2025, the population is 1,015,128, of which 47.7% are male, and 52.3% are female. Minors make up 12.5% of the population, and seniors make up 28.4%.

Foreign and Spanish born population pyramid, 2025

The Asturian population has the highest mortality rate in Spain and the lowest total fertility rate (1.03), the lowest in the European Union.

=== Languages ===
The only official language in Asturias is Spanish. The Asturian language, also known as Bable, is also spoken, and is protected by law (Ley 1/1998, de 23 de marzo, de uso y promoción del bable/asturiano – "Law 1/1998, of 23 March, of Use and Promotion of Bable/Asturian"). It is sometimes used by the Asturian civil service. In the western part of Asturias, Eonavian is also spoken, and its promotion also falls under the responsibility of Law 1/1998. Eonavian is intermediate between Asturian and Galician, though it is often regarded as just a variety of Galician; its use in the Asturian Administration is minor compared to the use of the Asturian language. Within Asturias, there is an ongoing process to establish place names in Asturian and Eonavian dialects.

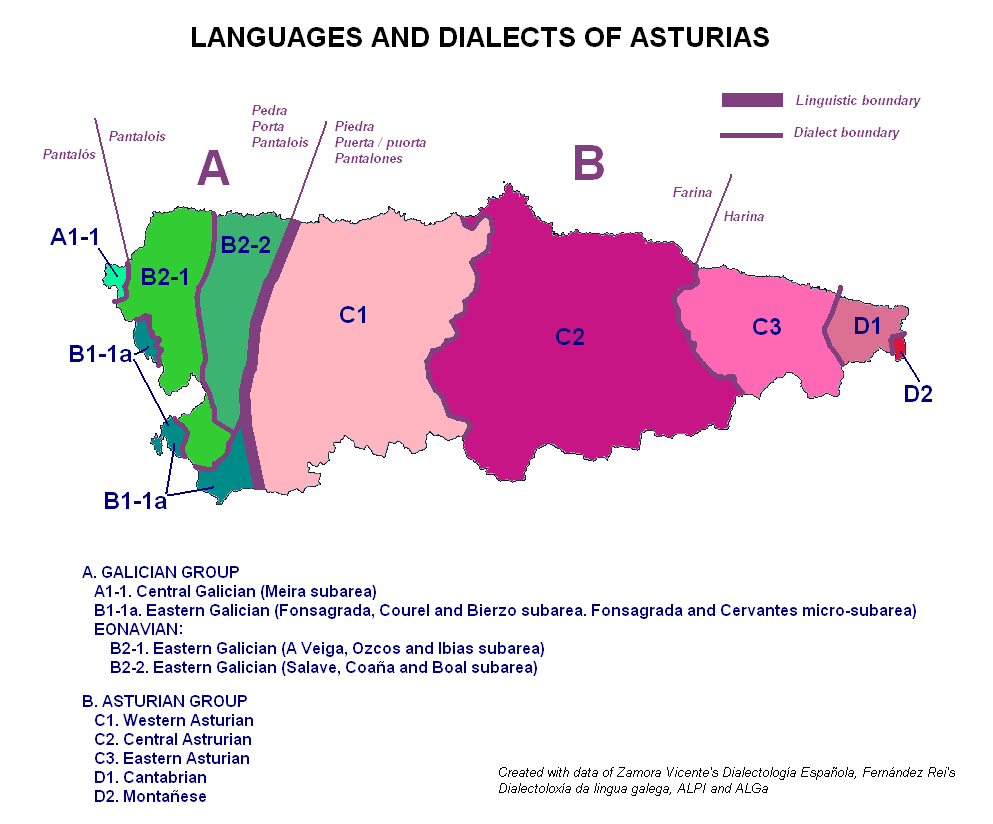
Language map of Asturias

=== Religion ===
In 2019, the Centre for Sociological Research carried a study showing the population of Asturias was 65.2% Catholic (25.1% practicing), 13.5% agnostic, and 12.8% atheist.

=== Immigration ===
Immigration is not as high as in the rest of Spain, as immigrants only make up 11.4% of the population as of 2025. The 5 largest foreign countries of birth are Colombia, Venezuela, Cuba, Argentina, and Romania.

== Politics ==
The organisation and political structure of Asturias is governed by the Statute of Autonomy of the Principality of Asturias, in force since 30 January 1982. According to the Statute, the institutional bodies of the Principality of Asturias are three: the Council of Government, the General Junta and President. The form of government of the Principality is Parliament: The General Junta is the legislature to choose, on behalf of the Asturian people, the president of the Principality of Asturias. The president of the Principality is also the president of the Council of Government, the head of executive power, and politically answerable to the General Junta.

The functions of the General Junta are the approval of budgets, and the direction and control of the action of the Council of Government. It is composed of 45 deputies, elected for four years through the universal suffrage within a system proportional representation that the allocation of deputies is based on D'Hondt method.

=== Results of the elections to the General Junta ===
Deputies in General Junta since 1983
Key to parties Podemos PCA–PCE IU–IX PAS PSOE UPyD UCD Cs URAS CDS CD FAC PP CP AP Vox
Election	Distribution	President
1983	5 / 26 / 14	Pedro de Silva (PSOE)
1987	4 / 20 / 8 / 13	Pedro de Silva (PSOE)
1991	6 / 1 / 21 / 2 / 15	Juan Luis Rodríguez-Vigil (PSOE); Antonio Trevín (PSOE)
1995	6 / 1 / 17 / 21	Sergio Marqués (PP / URAS)
1999	3 / 24 / 3 / 15	Vicente Álvarez Areces (PSOE)
2003	4 / 22 / 19	Vicente Álvarez Areces (PSOE)
2007	4 / 21 / 20	Vicente Álvarez Areces (PSOE)
2011	4 / 15 / 16 / 10	Francisco Álvarez-Cascos (FAC)
2012	5 / 17 / 1 / 12 / 10	Javier Fernández (PSOE)
2015	9 / 5 / 14 / 3 / 3 / 11	Javier Fernández (PSOE)
2019	4 / 2 / 20 / 5 / 2 / 10 / 2	Adrián Barbón (PSOE)
2023	1 / 3 / 19 / 1 / 17 / 4	Adrián Barbón (PSOE)

=== Administrative divisions ===
Asturias is organised territorially into 78 municipalities, further subdivided into parishes.

Asturias is also divided into eight comarcas, which are not administrative divisions. They are only used as a system to homogenize the statistical data made by the Principality.

==== Municipalities of Asturias ====
Largest municipalities in Asturias INE - 2025
Rank	Name	Comarca	Pop.	Rank	Name	Comarca	Pop.
1	Gijón	Gijón	271,259	11	Llanera	Oviedo	14,010
2	Oviedo	Oviedo	223,576	12	Llanes	Oriente	13,529
3	Avilés	Avilés	75,915	13	Laviana	Nalón	12,393
4	Siero	Oviedo	52,997	14	Cangas del Narcea	Narcea	11,290
5	Langreo	Nalón	38,615	15	Valdés	Eo-Navia	10,763
6	Mieres	Caudal	36,368	16	Lena	Caudal	10,411
7	Castrillón	Avilés	21,986	17	Gozón	Avilés	10,396
8	Corvera de Asturias	Avilés	15,793	18	Carreño	Gijón	10,296
9	San Martín del Rey Aurelio	Nalón	15,526	19	Aller	Caudal	10,007
10	Villaviciosa	Gijón	15,386	20	Grado	Oviedo	9,656

=== Parishes ===
The parroquia or parish is the subdivision of the Asturian municipalities. Currently, there are 857 parishes integrating the 78 municipalities in the region, and they usually coincide with the ecclesiastic divisions.

== Economy ==
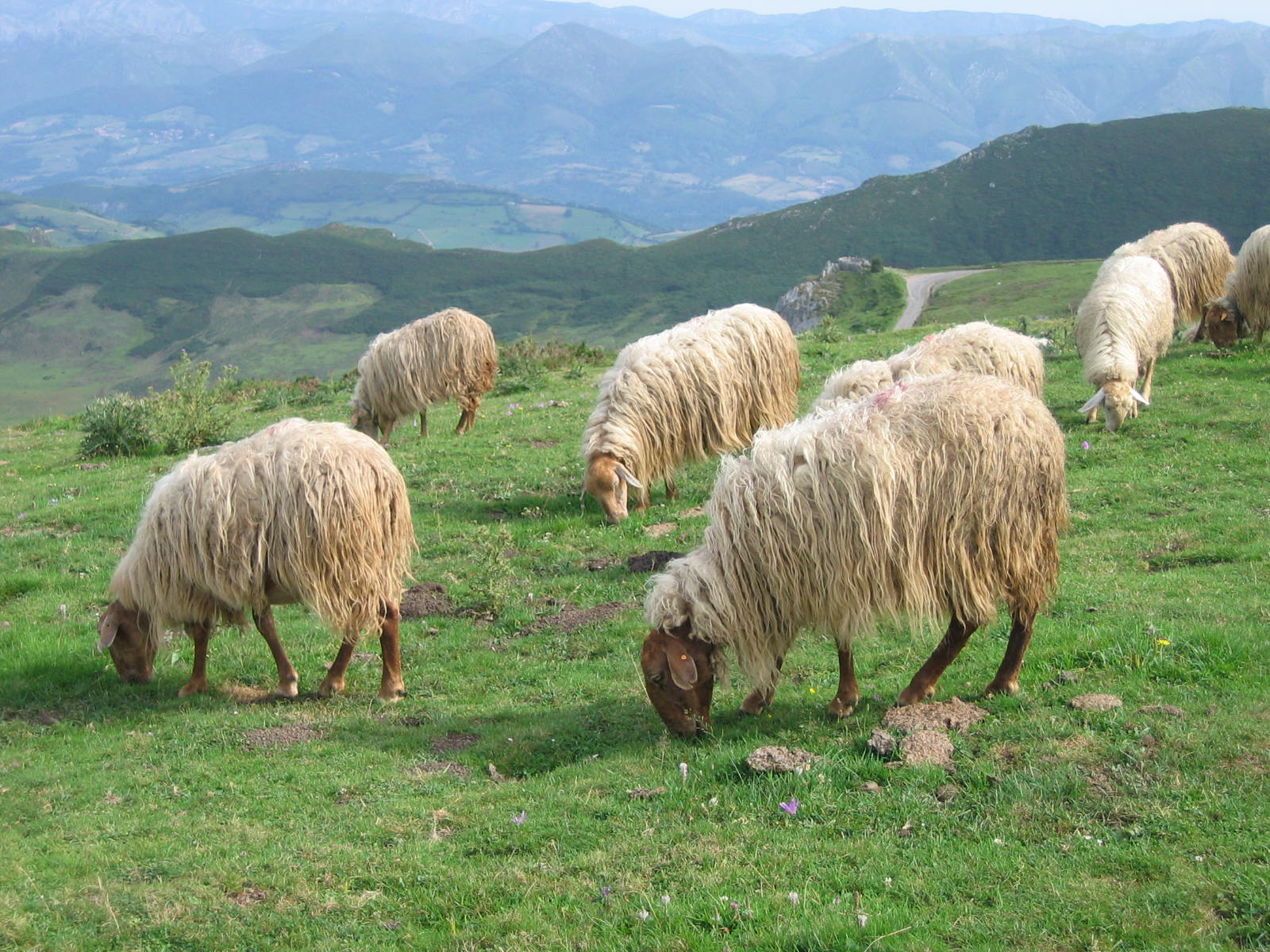
Asturian sheep on Picos de Europa

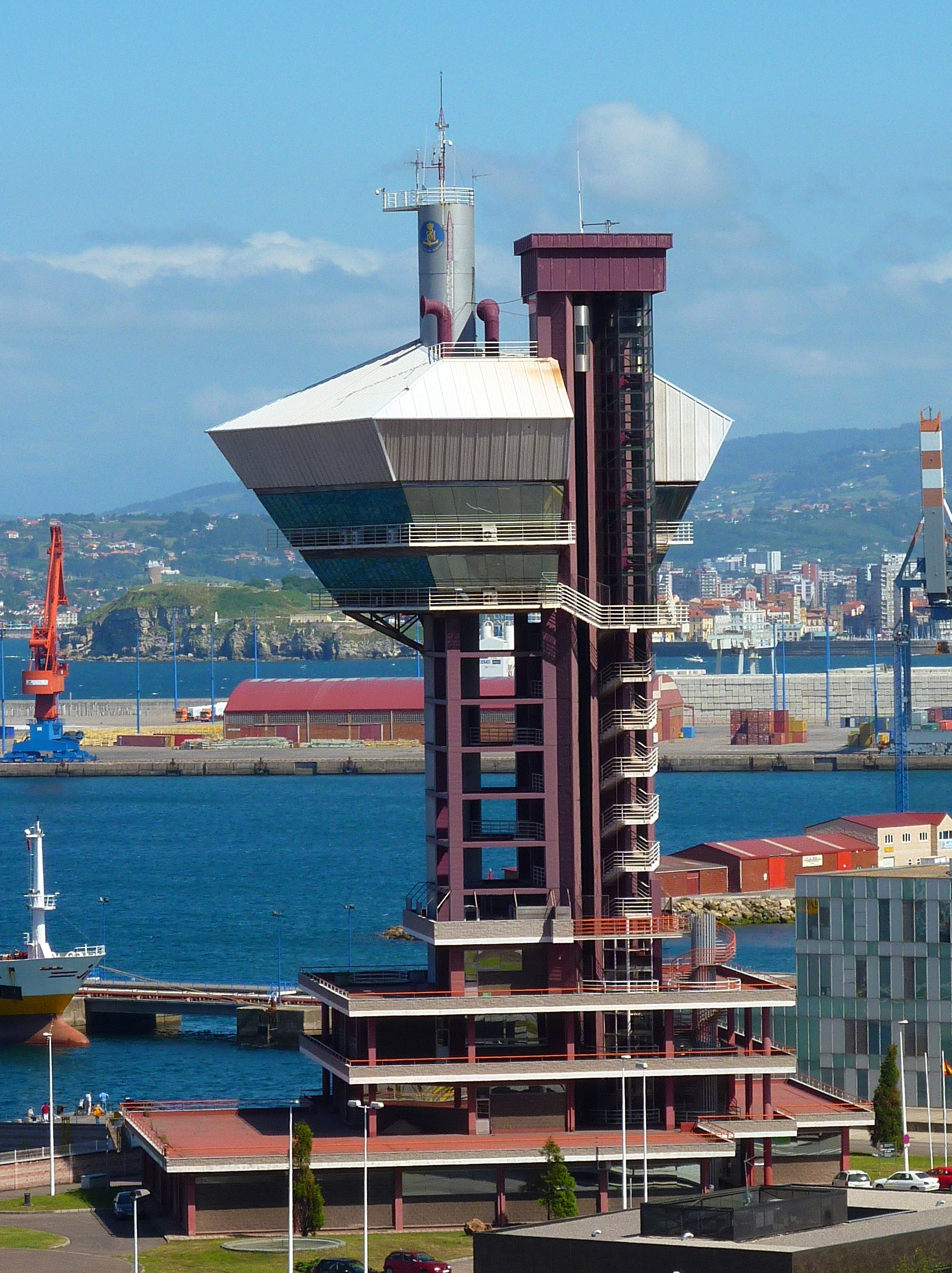
El Musel, the Port of Gijón

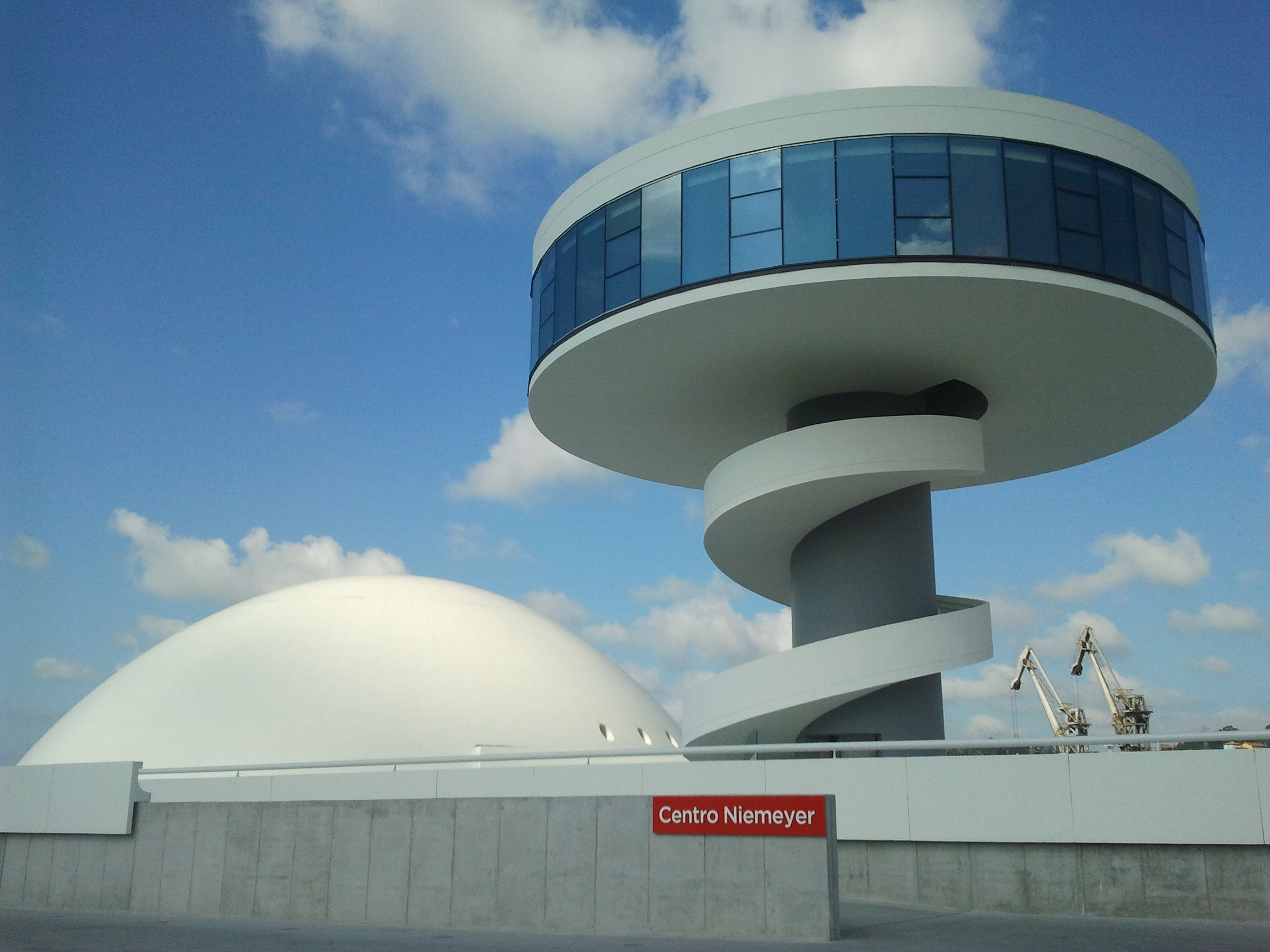
Centro Niemeyer designed by Oscar Niemeyer

For centuries, the backbone of the Asturian economy was agriculture and fishing. Milk production and its derivatives was also traditional, but its big development was a byproduct of the economic expansion of the late 1960s. Nowadays, products from the dairy cooperative Central Lechera Asturiana are being commercialised all over Spain.

The main regional industry in modern times, however, was coal mining and steel production: in the times of Francisco Franco's dictatorship, it was the centre of Spain's steel industry. The then state-owned ENSIDESA steel company is now part of the privatised Aceralia, now part of the ArcelorMittal Group. The industry created many jobs, which resulted in significant migration from other regions in Spain, mainly Extremadura, Andalusia and Castile and León.

The steel industry is now in decline when measured in terms of number of jobs provided, as is the mining. The reasons for the latter are mainly the high costs of production to extract the coal compared to other regions. Regional economic growth is below the broader Spanish rate, though in recent years growth in service industries has helped reduce Asturias's high rate of unemployment. Large out-of-town retail parks have opened near the region's largest cities (Gijón and Oviedo), whilst the ever-present Spanish construction industry appears to continue to thrive.

Asturias has benefited extensively since 1986 from European Union investment in roads and other essential infrastructure, though there has also been some controversy regarding how these funds are spent, for example, on miners' pensions.

The Gross domestic product (GDP) of the autonomous community was 23.3 billion euros in 2018, accounting for 1.9% of Spanish economic output. GDP per capita adjusted for purchasing power was 24,400 euros or 81% of the EU27 average in the same year. The GDP per employee was 98% of the EU average. This makes the region the 10th richest in Spain, a big decrease from the 1970s/1980s - the heyday of the Spanish mining industry, when Asturias was commonly regarded as one of the most prosperous regions in Southern Europe. Asturias has been growing below the Spanish national average since the decline of the mining industry, and grew just 0.82% in 2008, the lowest of all regions in Spain. On the plus side, unemployment in Asturias is below the average of Spain; it stood at 13.7% in 2017.

Year	2006	2007	2008	2009	2010	2011	2012	2013	2014	2015	2016	2017	2018	2019	2020
Unemployment rate	9.1%	8.0%	10.0%	14.1%	16.6%	18.8%	23.8%	22.3%	20.8%	20.3%	14.6%	14.6%	12.9%	13.1%	13.5%

== Transport ==
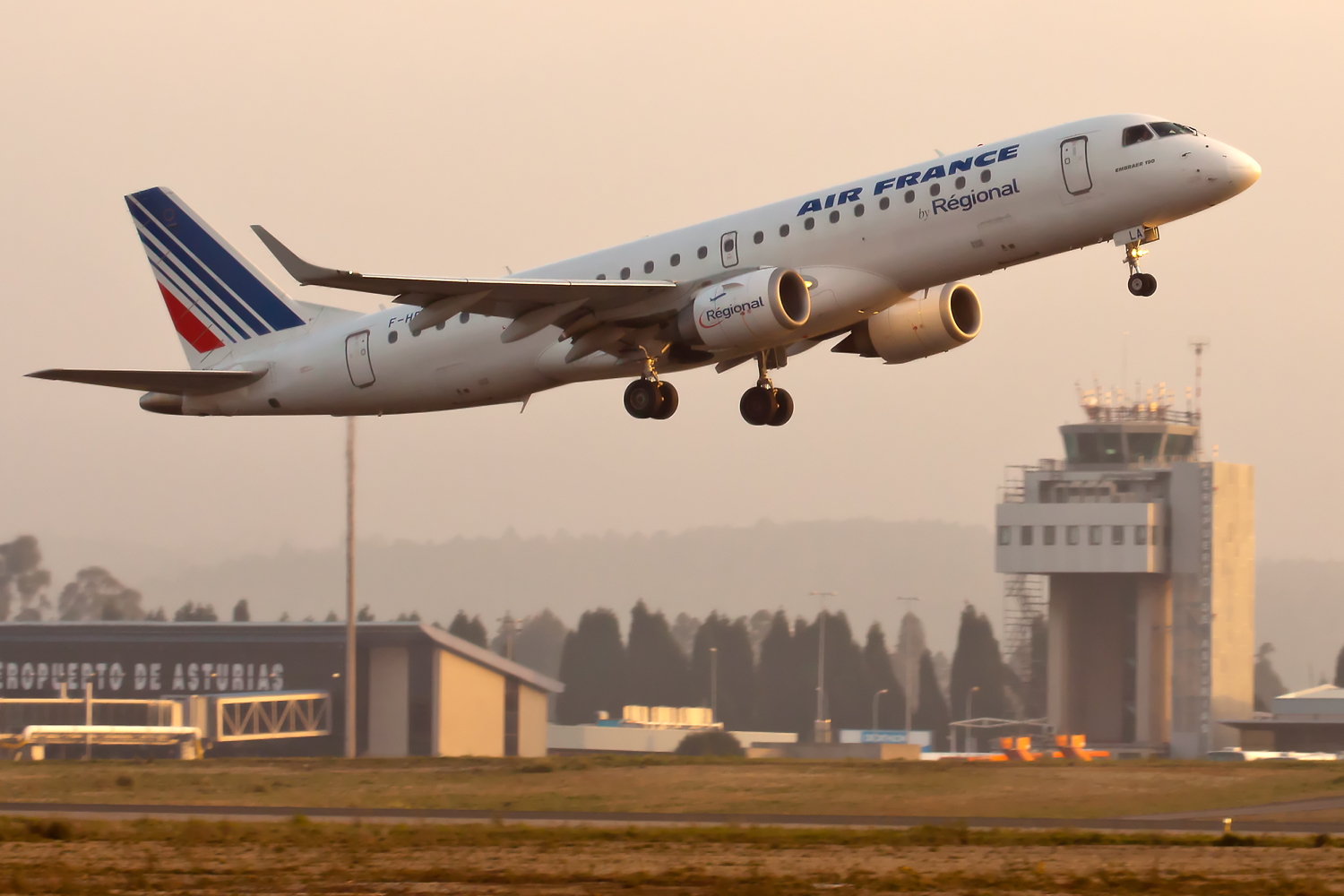
Asturias International Airport

=== Air ===
Asturias is served by Asturias International Airport (OVD), 40 kilometres (25 miles) from Oviedo, near the northwest coast and the industrial town of Avilés.

- Several national carriers link Asturias to Madrid and Barcelona, Alicante, Paris and others.
  - Binter
  - Iberia
  - Volotea
  - Vueling

Eastern Asturias is also easily accessible from Santander Airport. Recent improvements introduced in the road network permit flying into Santander and later driving into Asturias, which can be entered in less than an hour's drive. The Irish airline Ryanair operates flights to Santander Airport from Frankfurt Hahn, Liverpool, Dublin, Edinburgh, London Stansted and Rome Ciampino.

=== Sea ===
El Musel (the Port of Gijón) is able to receive cruise ships of any size. Companies such as P&O, Swan Hellenic or Hapag Lloyd choose the Port of Gijón every year for their calls in the Atlantic European Coast. The following areas are available for cruise vessels:

- Moliner quay: 313 m berthing with 14 m draught.
- 7ª Alignment: 326 m with 12 m draught.
- Espigón II. South alignment. 360 m berth with 9 m draught.

These locations allow a high degree of access control, with security guaranteed for both vessels and passengers alike. The city centre is only 4 km (2.5 mi) away and the Port Authority provides dedicated coach connection allowing passengers to take advantage of the cultural, gastronomic and commercial opportunities that Gijón has to offer.

Between 2010 and 2014, the city of Gijón was connected by ferry with the French city of Nantes. This connection was also known as the "sea highway" and it had a frequency of two ferries per day in both directions. The route was cancelled in September 2014.

=== Train ===
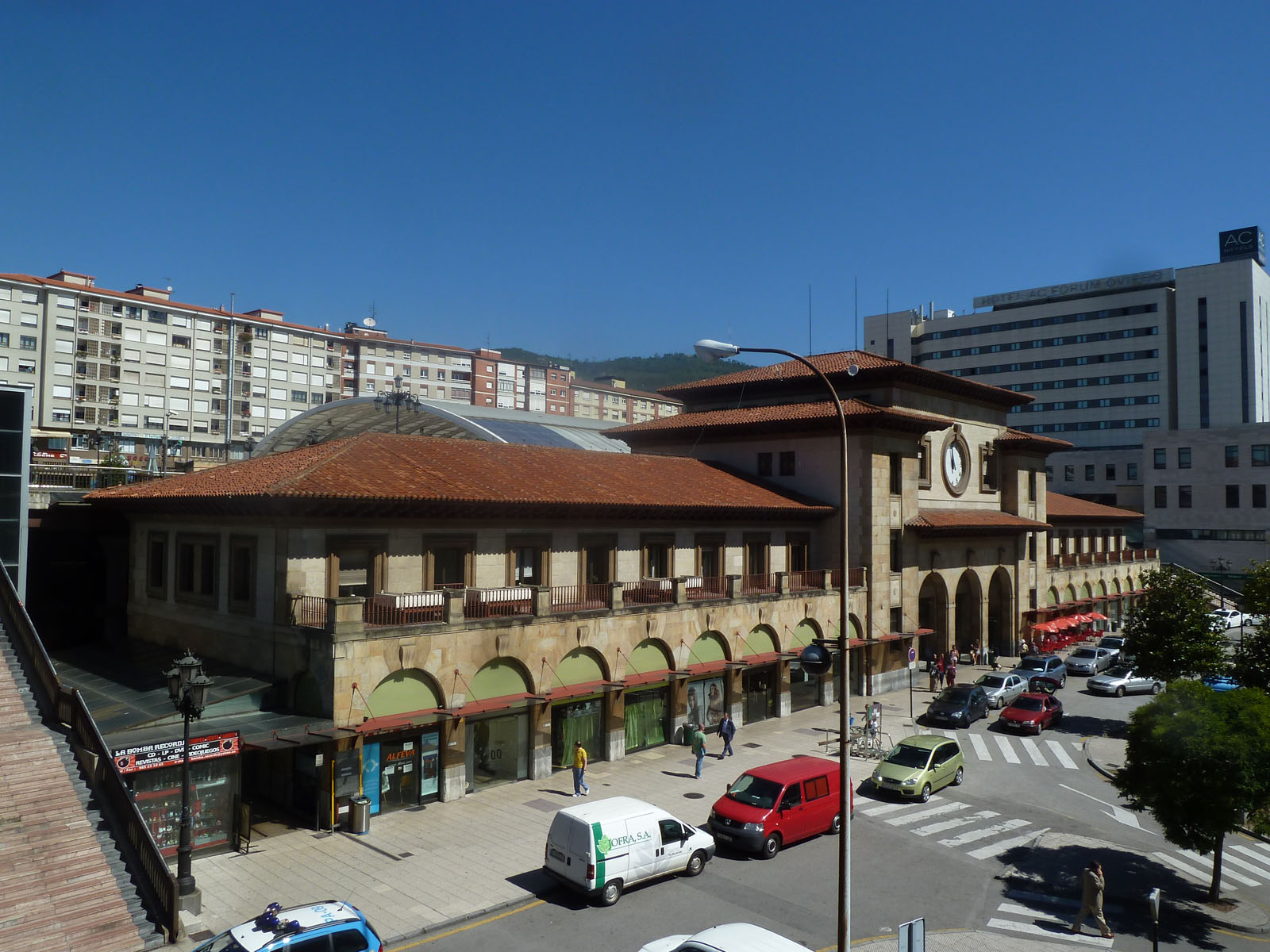
Oviedo railway station

Spain's national Renfe rail network also serves Asturias well; trains regularly depart to and from the Spanish interior as well as Eastern and Western Asturias. Major stops are the regional capital, Oviedo, and the main coastal city, Gijón. Under the Cantabrian Mountains, the Pajares Base Tunnel opened for commercial services end of November 2023, introducing AVE high speed trains.

=== Bus ===
There is also a comprehensive bus service run by the ALSA company. It links Avilés, Gijón, Oviedo and Mieres with Madrid and other major towns, several times a day. These include services to Barcelona, Salamanca, León, Valladolid, A Coruña, Bilbao, Seville, San Sebastián, Paris, Brussels and Nice, to name just a few.

== Main sights ==
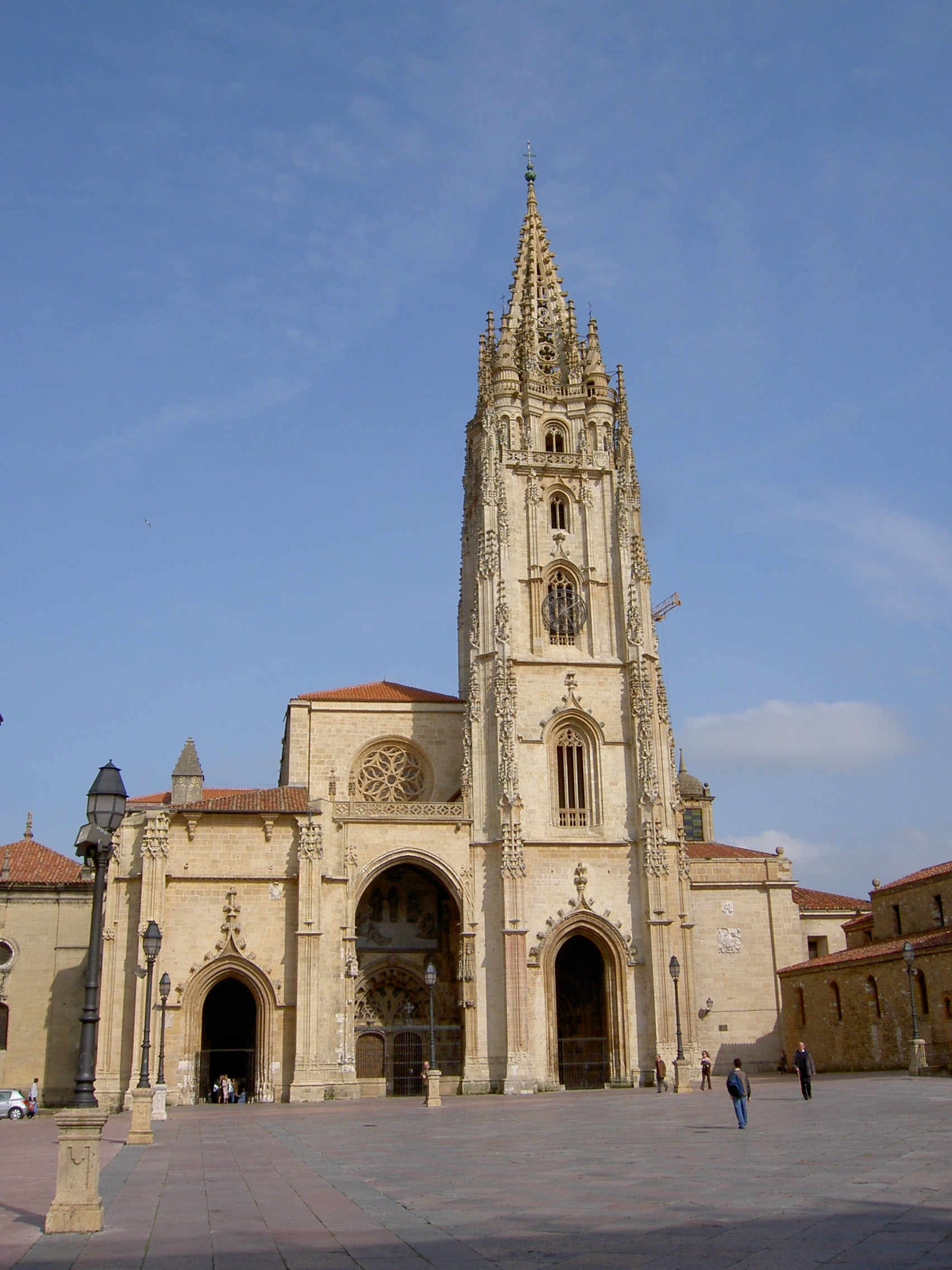
The Oviedo Cathedral. Built from 781 to 16th century.

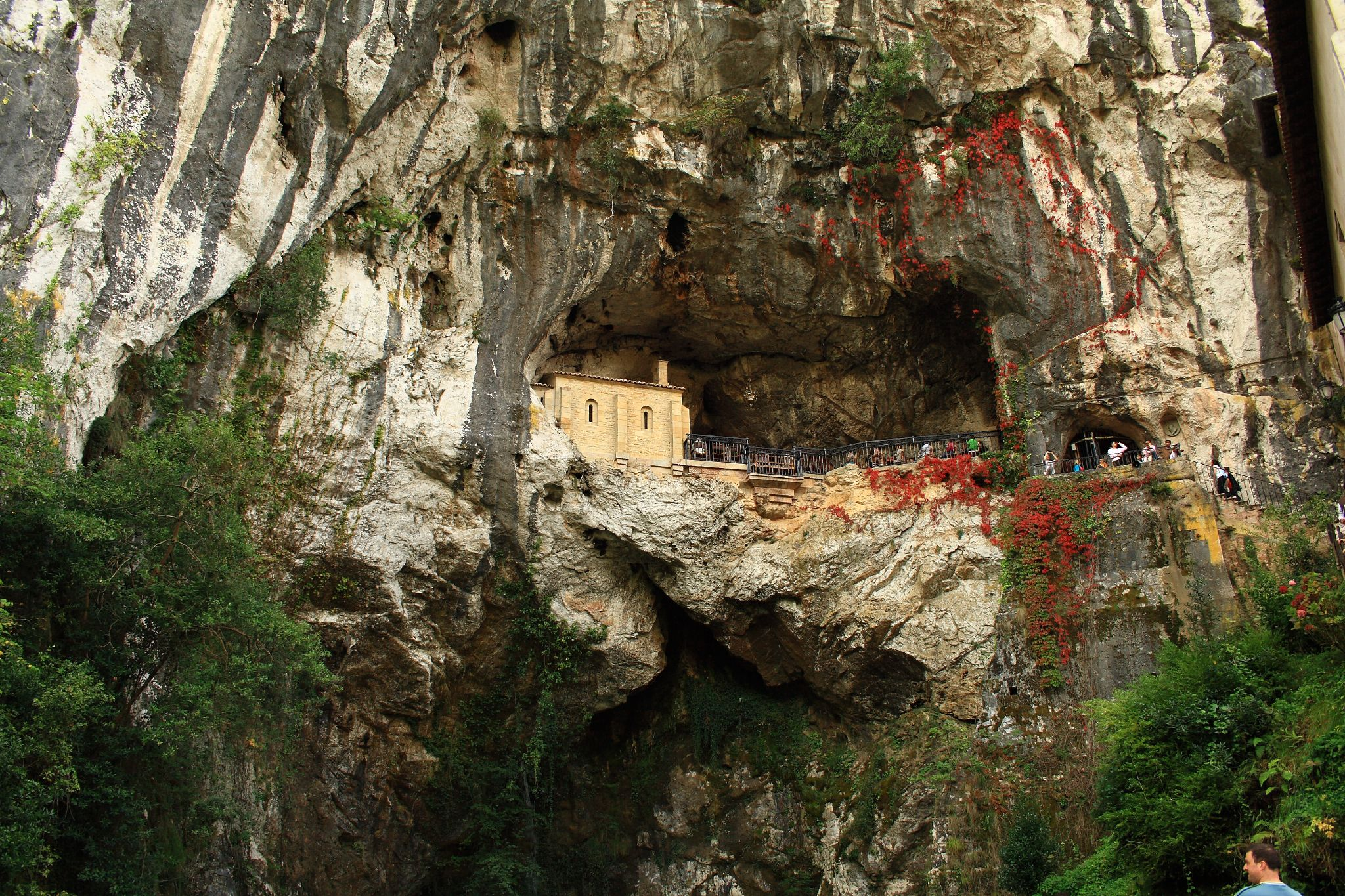
Holy Cave of Covadonga

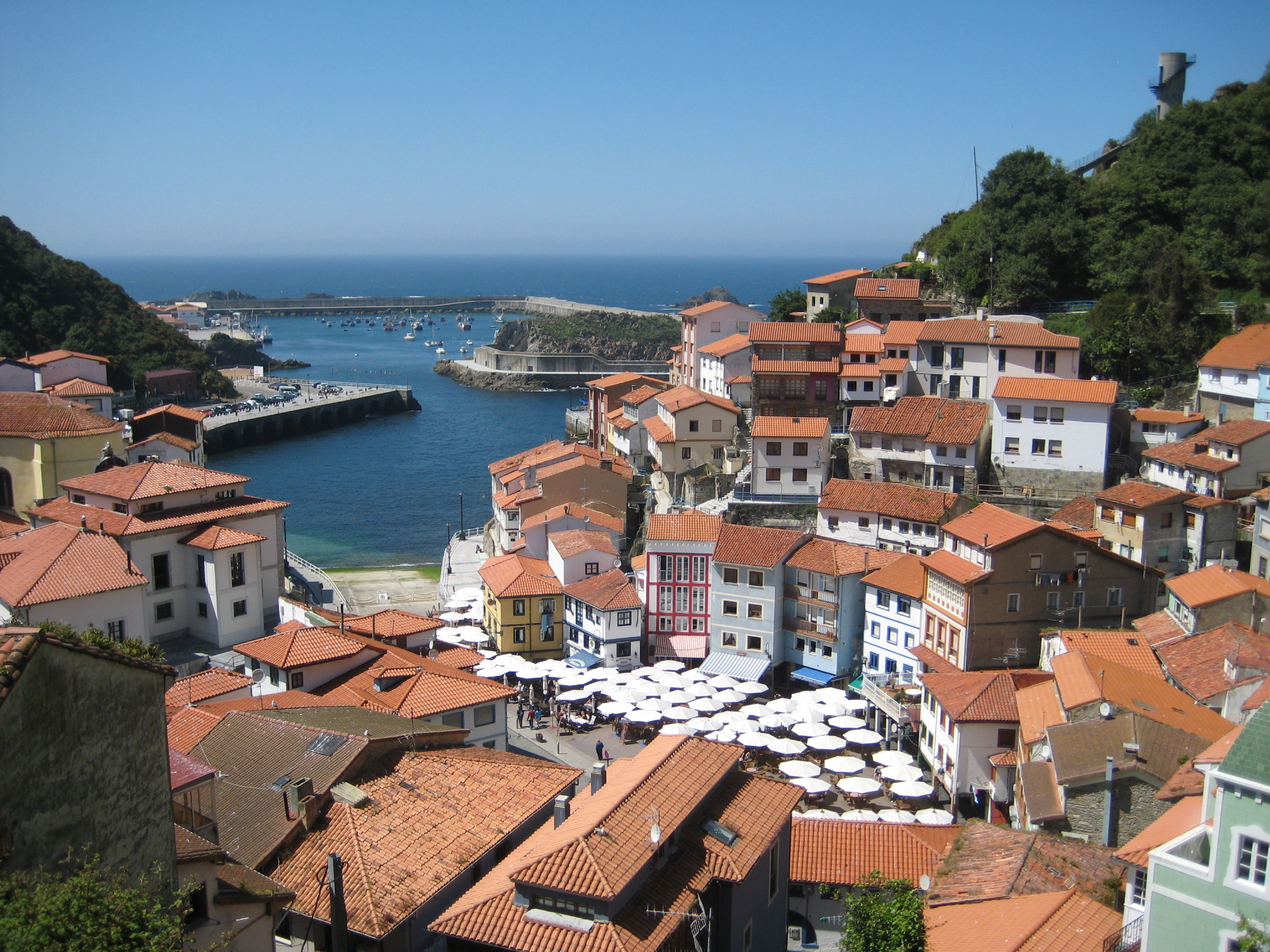
The village of Cudillero

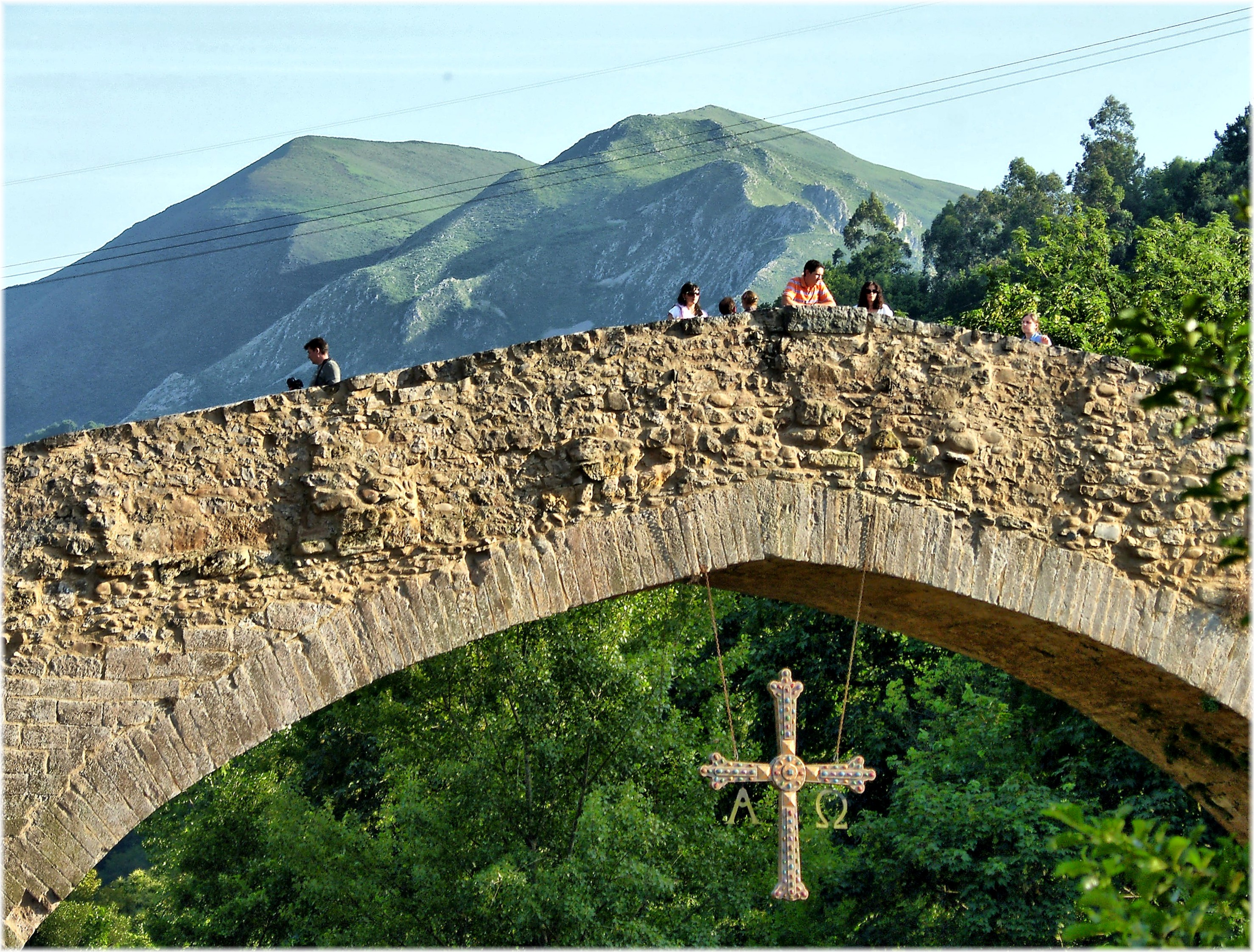
The Roman Bridge of Cangas de Onís

=== Key attractions ===
Oviedo is the capital city of Asturias and contains Santa María del Naranco and San Miguel de Lillo, a pre-Romanesque church and a palace respectively, which were built by the first Asturian kings on Mount Naranco, to the north of the city (World Heritage Site). In modern architecture, the Palacio de Congresos de Oviedo (or Modoo) was designed by Santiago Calatrava.

Gijón, the biggest city of Asturias, is a coastal city known for cultural and sports events, and a beach tourism centre in northern Spain. It also is known for the traditional Asturian gastronomy and for being an Asturian cider production spot. Museums in the city include the Universidad Laboral de Gijón, including a modern art museum and theatre.

Avilés is the third largest city in Asturias, where "La villa del adelantado" (as locals call it, in reference of Pedro Menéndez de Avilés) is a meeting point. "Saint Nicholas of Bari" or "Capilla de los Alas" in Romanesque and Romanesque-Gothic style, respectively; Palacio de Balsera, in Modernist style or St. Thomas of Canterbury church (dating from the 13th century) are examples which show the historical patrimony to be found in the city. The Centro Niemeyer, designed by the Brazilian architect Oscar Niemeyer, is an example of contemporary architecture in Asturias.

The Picos de Europa National Park, and other parts of the Asturian mountain range: The Picu Urriellu mountain (2519 m or 8262 ft), also known as El Naranjo de Bulnes, is a molar-shaped peak which, reputedly, glows orange in the evening sun, hence its name. Weather permitting, it can be viewed from Camarmeña village, near Poncebos, south of Arenas de Cabrales.

The shrine to the Virgin of Covadonga and the mountain lakes (Los Lagos), near Cangas de Onís: Legend has it that in the 8th century, the Virgin blessed Asturian Christian forces with a well-timed signal to attack Spain's Moorish conquerors, thereby taking the invaders by surprise in the Battle of Covadonga. The Reconquista and eventual unification of all Spain is therefore said to have started in this very location.

The Paleolithic art in the caves of Asturias is a declared World Heritage Site with the Paleolithic Art of Northern Spain.

Asturias also has examples of industrial heritage as a consequence of its industrial activities in the 19th and 20th centuries. It had metallurgical and chemical factories, mines, bridges and railways, including in the towns of Langreo, Mieres and Avilés.

The Asturian coast: especially the beaches in and around the summer resort of Llanes, the Playa del Silencio near Cudillero fishing village, or the "white" village of Luarca (Severo Ochoa hometown).

=== Other places of interest ===
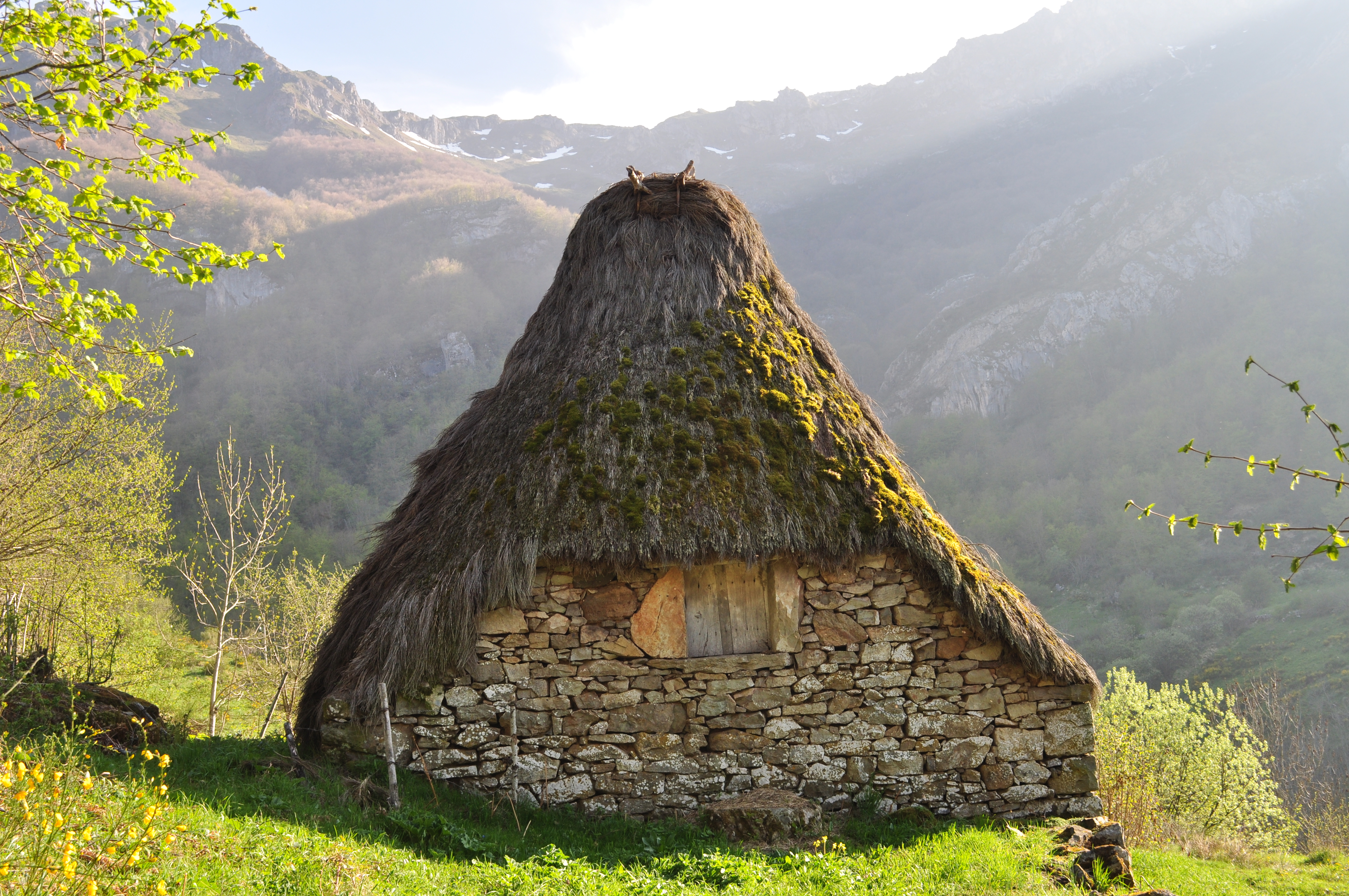
Traditional Teito in Somiedo Natural Park

- Ceceda village: east of Oviedo along the N634 road. Of particular interest in this exemplary settlement are the traditional horreos (grain silos), raised on stilts so as to keep field mice from getting at the grain.
- The Dobra River: south of Cangas de Onís, known for its unusual colour.
- The senda costera (coastal way) between Pendueles and Llanes: This partly paved nature route takes in some of Asturias' most spectacular coastal scenery, such as the noisy bufones (blowholes) and the Playa de Ballota.
- Caldoveiro Peak, a scenic mountain hiking area
- The unusual rock formation on the beach at Buelna village: east of Llanes. Best viewed at low tide.

== Culture ==
=== Architecture ===
Asturias has a rich artistic legacy that emphasizes Romanesque (Asturias Arts) indigenous architecture with monuments like Santa María del Naranco, Santa Cristina de Lena and San Miguel de Lillo. These monuments have a Ramirense Romanesque style (due to Ramiro I) or San Julián de los Prados, known as Santullano (Oviedo) of the Alfonsino pre-Romanesque style (due to Alfonso II), which are all in Oviedo. Other examples of architecture are Villaviciosa's church, San Salvador de Valdediós (commonly known by the Asturians as "Conventín"), and the church of San Salvador de Priesca. Another example is Cabranes' San Julian de Viñón.

The Romanesque style is very present, since all Asturias is crossed by one of the Camino de Santiago routes, which highlights the Monastery of San Pedro de Villanueva (near Cangas de Onis), the churches of San Esteban de Aramil (Siero), San Juan de Amandi (Villaviciosa) and Santa María de Junco (Ribadesella).

The Gothic style is not as abundant, but there are good examples of this style, such as the Cathedral of San Salvador in Oviedo.

The Baroque style is more present by means of palace architecture, with such notable examples as the Palace of Camposagrado and Velarde - the latter seat of Museum of Fine Arts of Asturias. The Baroque style stands out in public civil engineering and bridge tolls (Olloniego); the milestones, the chairs or seats present along the road to Madrid and the resort of Caldas de Priorio (Oviedo) building.

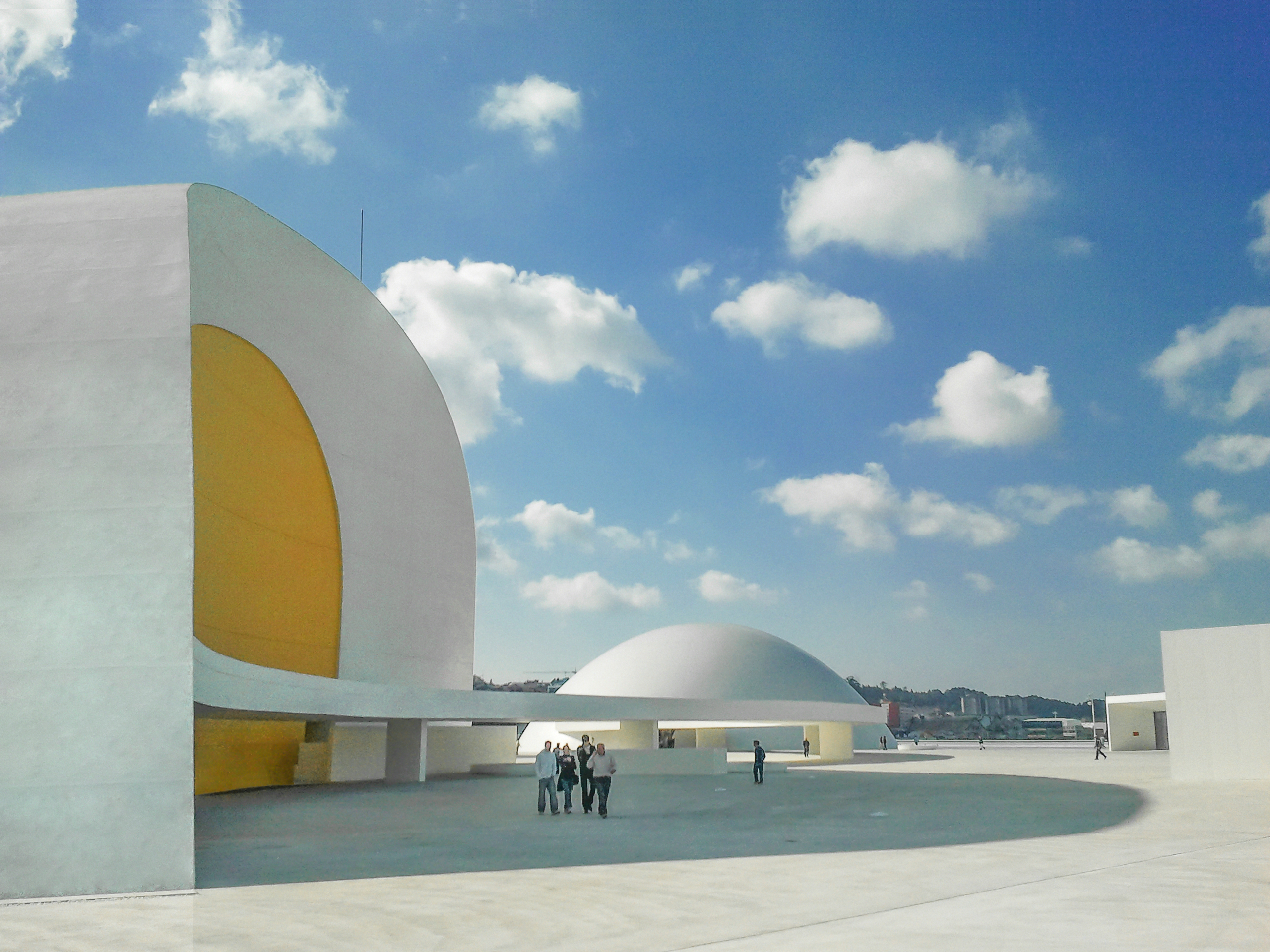
Oscar Niemeyer International Cultural Centre

In 1985, the UNESCO declared the pre-Romanesque monuments and the Cathedral of Oviedo as World Heritage Sites.

In popular architecture, the traditional granaries in Asturias, called hórreos, are known for their demographic extension and their functional evolution, its basic characteristic being its mobility: it can be easily dismounted and transported to another location. The Panera is the evolution of the hórreo, with examples exceeding 100 square metres (1,076 square feet) of area covered. The purpose of the horreo is to store objects and crops. With the arrival of maize and the beans, they were endowed with exterior corridors and railings for drying the harvests.

Asturias is home to the only architectural work in Spain (as well as the largest in Europe) of the Brazilian architect and disciple of Le Corbusier; Oscar Niemeyer: the Oscar Niemeyer International Cultural Centre. The architectural project was donated to the Principality by the architect, who was awarded the Prince of Asturias Award for the Arts, in the XXV edition of these awards. Niemeyer's project combined several different elements, and projected an open space, a place for education, culture and peace.

In the capital of the Principality stands one of the most representative buildings of modern architecture, the Palace of Congresses of Oviedo, by the Spanish architect Santiago Calatrava, who also awarded the Prince of Asturias of Award for the Arts in 1999.

Special importance has been placed in recent years on the recovery of industrial heritage through various routes and industrial museums, especially in the central area of the region.

=== Festivals and holidays ===
Some of the most famous festivals in Asturias take place in the small town of Llanes. These festivals celebrate the important saints and the Virgin Mary adored by the town. The associations that prepare the festivals have a rivalry between them and each year they try to outdo each other with more impressive shows. The three most important are the festival of San Roque (St. Roque) held on the 16th of August, the festival of Nuestra Señora Virgen de La Guia (Our Lady, Virgin Mary, the Guide) held on the 8th of September, and the festival of Santa Maria Magdalena (St. Mary Magdalene) held on the 22nd of July. The Magdalena is well known for its march of logs where boys as young as 3 and men carry logs through the town until they reach the end point and start a large bonfire.

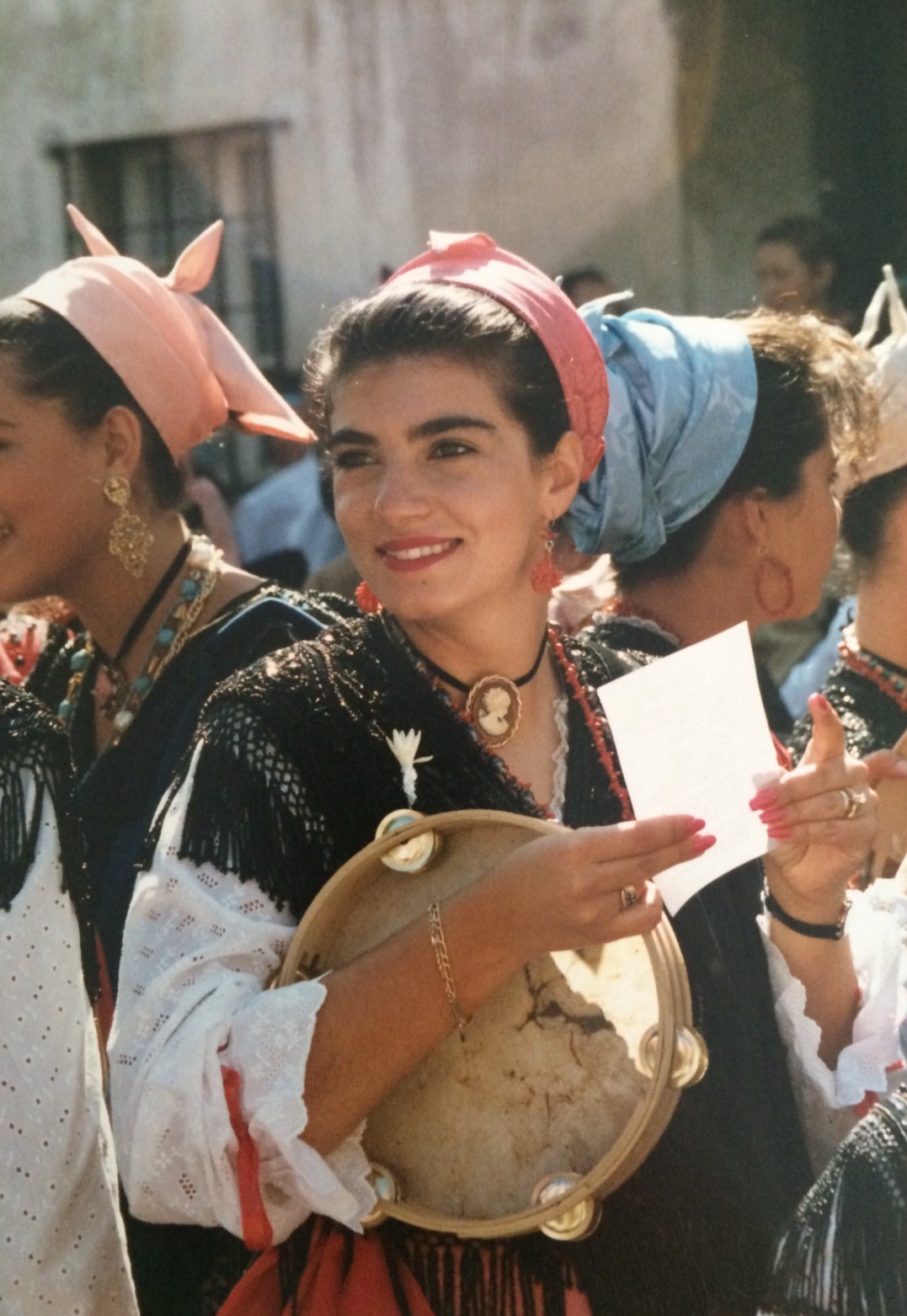
Traditional Asturian dress being worn during a major festival in Llanes

=== Food and drink ===
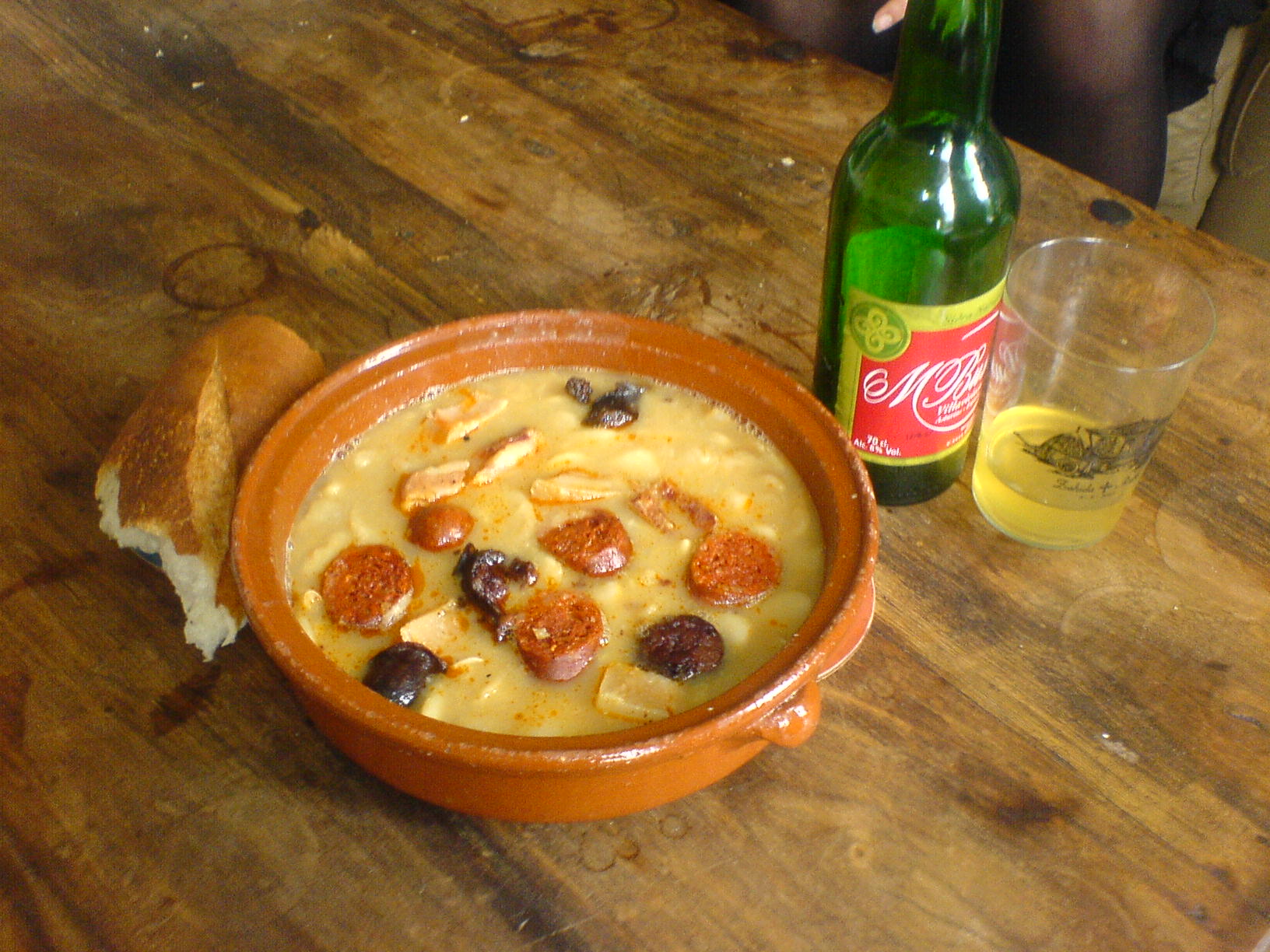
Fabada asturiana and sidra (cider), a typical dish of Asturias

While Asturias is especially known for its seafood, the most famous regional dish is fabada asturiana, a rich stew typically made with large white beans (fabes), shoulder of pork (lacón), black pudding (morcilla), and spicy sausage (chorizo). Another popular dish is cachopo.

Apple groves foster the production of the region's traditional alcoholic drink, a natural cider (sidra). Since it is natural and bottled without gas, it produces a weak carbonation, and when Asturian cider is served, it is poured in a particular way, el escanciado: the bottle is held above the head allowing for a long vertical pour, causing the cider to be aerated as it splashes into the glass below. After drinking most of the content, it is customary to splash a little out onto the ground, as a way to clean the glass of any lees for the next serving. Traditionally, the same glass is refilled and passed around, with everyone drinking from it in turn.

Asturian cheeses, especially Cabrales, are also eaten throughout Spain and beyond; Asturias is often called "the land of cheeses" (el país de los quesos).

=== Sport ===
Asturias has two main football teams: Sporting de Gijón and Real Oviedo, which have played over 35 seasons in La Liga. Other current notable sports teams are Oviedo CB (basketball) and AB Gijón Jovellanos (handball).

Racing driver Fernando Alonso is a two-time Formula One world champion, two-time Le Mans winner and FIA World Endurance winner. He races with Asturias' flag colours and the Asturian cross on his helmet. Cyclist Samuel Sánchez won a gold at the Olympic games. Football players from Asturias include World Cup winner David Villa as well as Quini, Luis Enrique, Juan Manuel Mata, and Santiago Cazorla, among others.

=== Literature ===
These are some notable people of Asturian Literature:

- Antón de Marirreguera (17th century)
- Gaspar Melchor de Jovellanos (1744–1811)
- Ramón de Campoamor (1817–1901)
- Leopoldo Alas, "Clarín" (1851–1901)
- Armando Palacio Valdés (1853–1938)
- Ramón Pérez de Ayala (1880–1962)
- Alfonso Camín (1890–1982)
- Alejandro Casona (1903–1965)
- Carlos Bousoño (1923-2015)
- Ángel González (1925–2008)
- Corín Tellado (1927–2009)
- Gonzalo Suárez (1934)
- Rafael Reig (1963)
- Aurelio González Ovies (1964)
- Xuan Bello (1965–2025)
- Jorge Moreno (1973)

=== Music ===
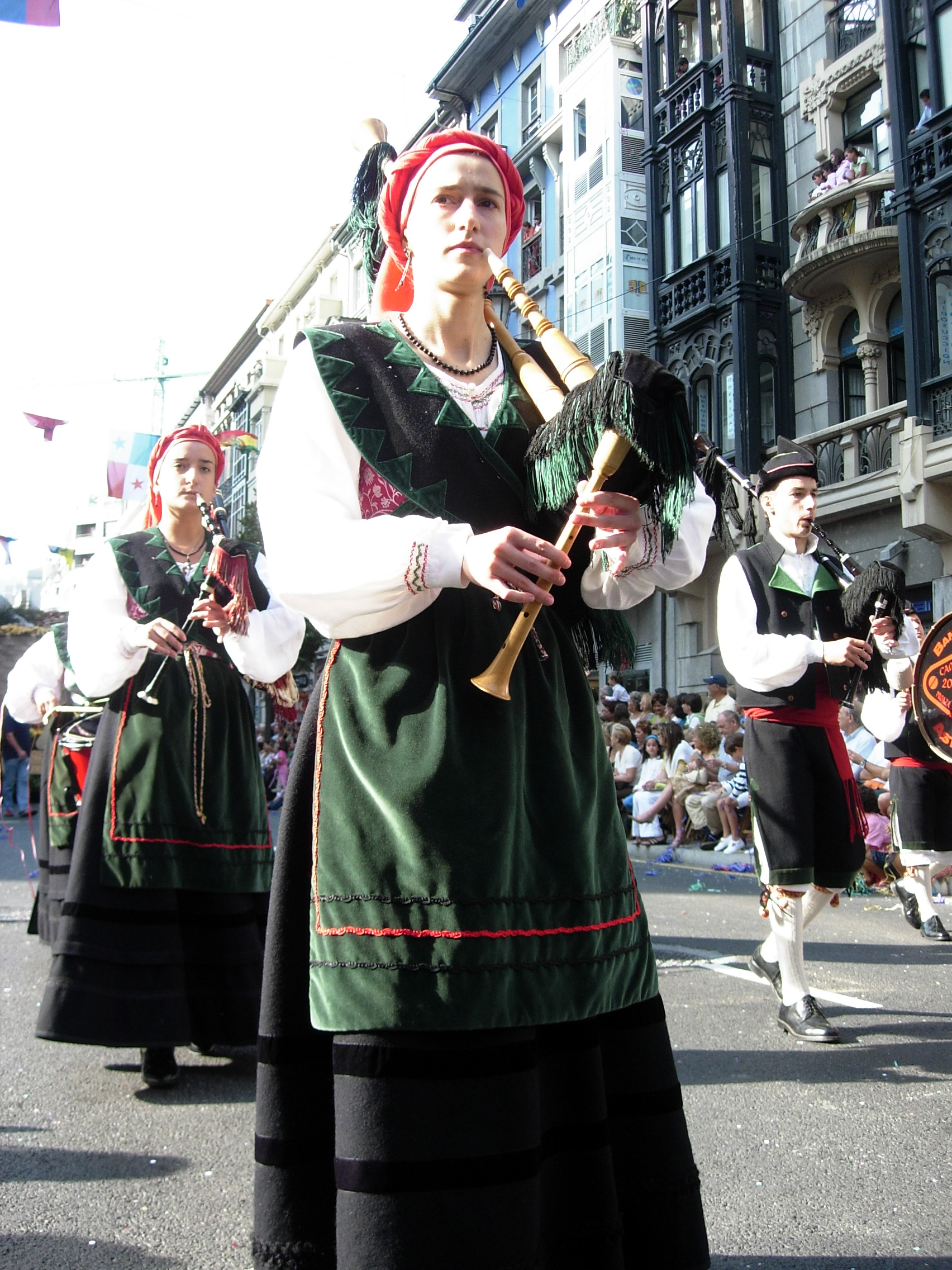
Gaita asturiana

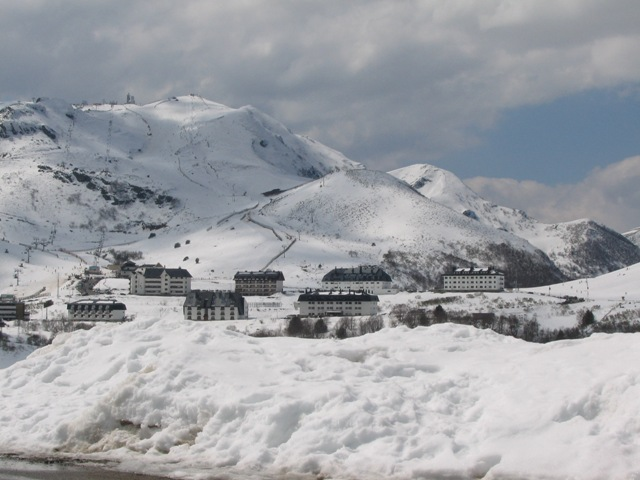
Valgrande-Pajares ski resort

The music of Asturias is varied. The most characteristic instrument in traditional music is the Asturian bagpipe, or Gaita asturiana, which has a single drone. The bagpipe is often accompanied by the hand drum, whistles and accordion.

In recent years, there has been a resurgence of interest in traditional folk music, and several music ensembles have gained regional and international recognition for their ethnomusicological study and presentation of indigenous Asturian music. Notable examples include traditional pipers such as Xuacu Amieva and Tejedor and fusionist José Ángel Hevia (whose music video provides views of both the gaita and the Asturian landscape), and the groups Llan de Cubel, Xera, Nuberu and Felpeyu. Additionally, numerous rock, ska and heavy metal groups have also found relative success within Asturias, many of which incorporate elements of traditional Asturian music into their sound.

==== Anthem ====
The Asturian anthem Asturias, patria querida (Asturias, beloved fatherland), which was a popular song adopted as the region's anthem and formalised by Ley 1/1984, de 27 de Abríl.

==== Orquesta Sinfónica del Principado de Asturias ====
The Orquesta Sinfónica del Principado de Asturias is the premier orchestra in the Principality of Asturias. It is based in the Auditorio Príncipe Felipe in Oviedo, but also performs in the main concert venues in Gijón and Avilés. Rossen Milanov is the music director.

==== Other ====
Asturias is also the name of the fifth movement of the Suite Española, Op. 47 by Spanish composer Isaac Albéniz. Nevertheless, the music has little in common with the region's own folklore. Another famous piece of classical music more authentically inspired by the Asturian musical heritage is Nikolai Rimsky-Korsakov's Capriccio Espagnol, which prominently features a theme from an alborada, a dance tune traditionally played to celebrate the rising of the sun.

== Events ==
- Princess of Asturias Awards
- Gijón International Film Festival (Entertainment)
- Avilés International Cinema and Architecture Festival (Entertainment)
- International Sella River Descent

== Notable people ==
- Carolina del Castillo Díaz (1867–1933), Spanish painter
- Luis Enrique Martínez García, former FC Barcelona captain and manager. he has also been the manager of Spain's men's national football team since July 9, 2018.
- Juan Carreño de Miranda, court painter
- Fernando Alonso, Formula One racing driver, 2005 and 2006 world champion
- Leopoldo Alas "Clarín", 19th-century author of La Regenta, a seminal work in the Spanish literary canon
- Armando Palacio Valdés, 19th and 20th-century novelist and critic
- Francisco Álvarez Cascos, minister in Spain's government 1996–2000 and 2000–2004
- Jose Luis Blanco Vega (1928–2005), Jesuit and film critic
- Santi Cazorla, Arsenal and Spain international football player, European Champion 2008 and 2012
- Torcuato Fernández-Miranda, key lawmaker during the Spanish transition to democracy
- Ángel González, major Spanish poet of the 20th century
- Gaspar Melchor de Jovellanos, philosopher, politician, Enlightenment thinker
- Pedro Rodríguez de Campomanes, statesman, economist, and Enlightenment writer
- Agustín Argüelles, liberal politician
- Pedro Menéndez de Avilés Spanish explorer and founder of Saint Augustine, Florida
- Gonzalo Méndez de Canço, governor of Spanish Florida (1596–1603)
- Queen Letizia of Spain, a native of Oviedo and wife of Felipe VI, King of Spain
- Severo Ochoa, 1959 Nobel Prize winner for physiology or medicine
- Rafael del Riego, general and liberal politician
- Carmen Polo, wife of Spanish dictator Francisco Franco
- Chechu Rubiera, cyclist
- Victor Manuel, Spanish singer-songwriter
- José Andrés, chef
- Amalia Ulman, artist
- David Villa, former Spain international footballer, European Champion 2008, World Champion 2010
- Juan Manuel Mata, former Spain international footballer, World Champion 2010 and European Champion 2012
- Michu, former Swansea City and Rayo Vallecano player
- Xaviel Vilareyo, national poet, writer and musician
- Samuel Sánchez, cyclist, Olympic gold medalist
- Melendi, is a Spanish pop singer-songwriter
- Pablo Carreño, professional tennis player
- Margarita Salas, scientist
- Miguel Díaz-Canel, President of Cuba
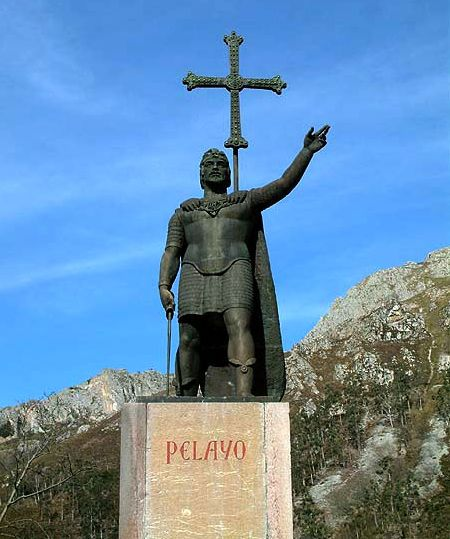
Pelagius, first king of Asturias

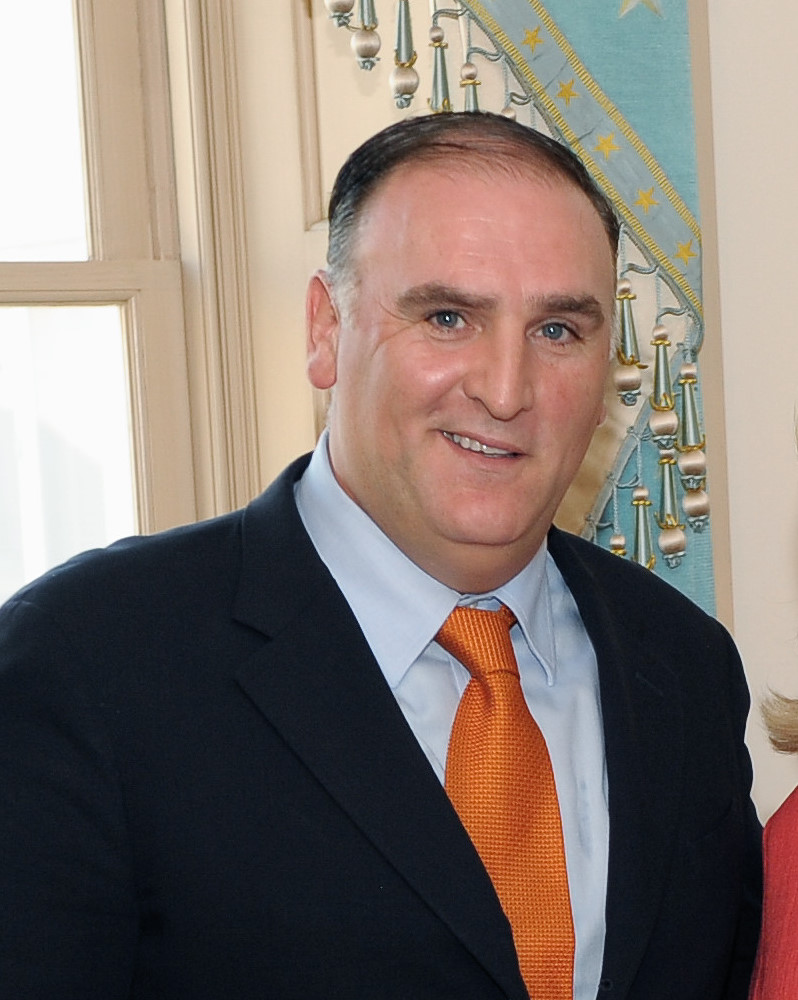
José Andrés, famous chef

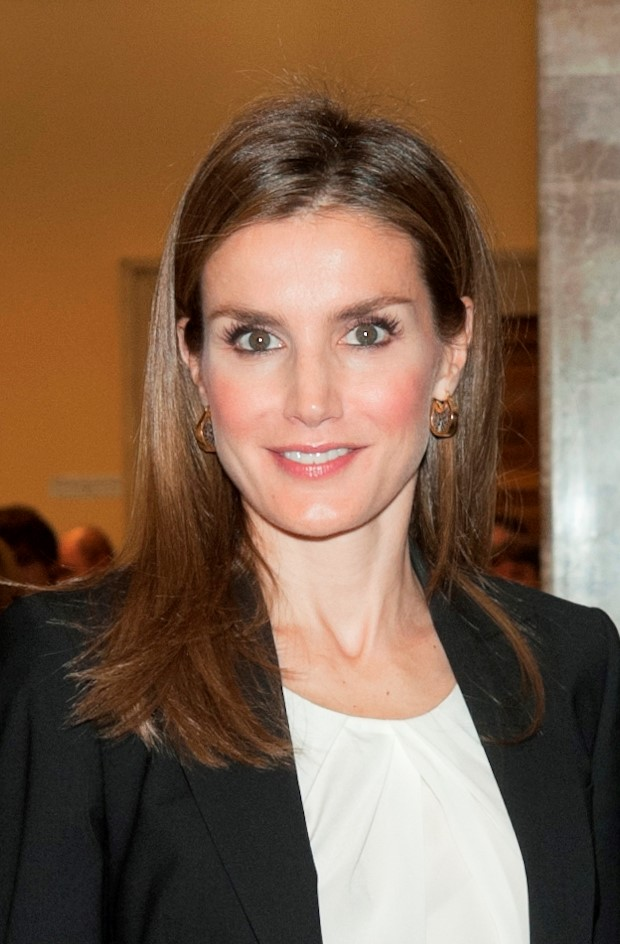
Queen Letizia, current Queen consort of Spain

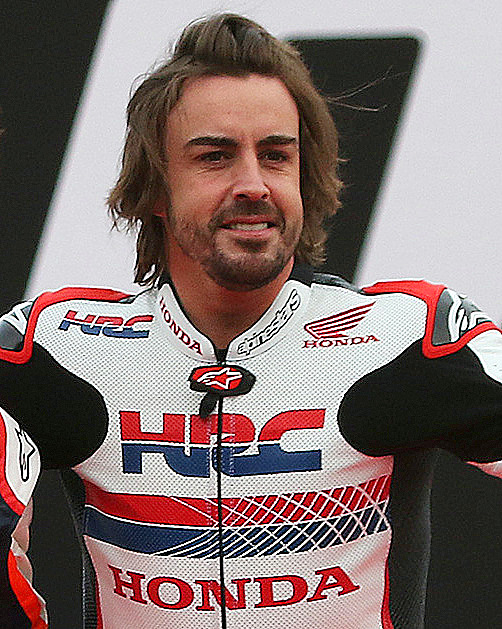
Fernando Alonso

== See also ==
- Arama 36/37: Association for the Recovery of Asturian Military Architecture 1936–1937
- Asturian architecture between the years 711 to 925
- Asturian mythology
- Asturcón pony
- Asturian cinema
- Churches in Asturias
- List of oldest church buildings

== Bibliography ==
- Bowen-Jones, H. and W.B. Fisher. Spain: An Introductory Geography. New York: Praeger, 1966.
- Dresner, Denise, ed. Guide to the World. Phoenix: Oryx Press, 1998. S.v. "Asturias"
- Encyclopedia Americana. Danbury: Grolier, 2002. S.v. "Asturias"
- Merriam-Webster's Geographical Dictionary. Springfield: Merriam-Webster, 1997. S.v. "Asturias"
