= Dobra (Sella) =

River in Asturias, Spain

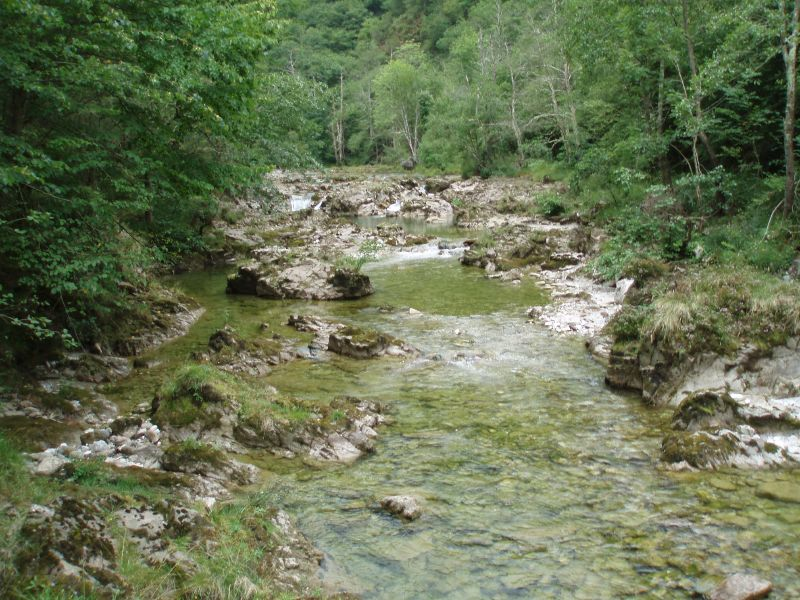
- View of Dobra River.

Location
- Country: Spain
- State: Asturias

Physical characteristics
- Source
  - location: Cantabrian Mountains
- Mouth
  - location: Sella River
  - coordinates: 43°18′0″N 5°8′0″W
- Length: 23 km (14 mi)

The Dobra is a river in northern Spain flowing through the Autonomous Community of Asturias.
