= Asturian literature =

Literature from the Iberian Peninsula

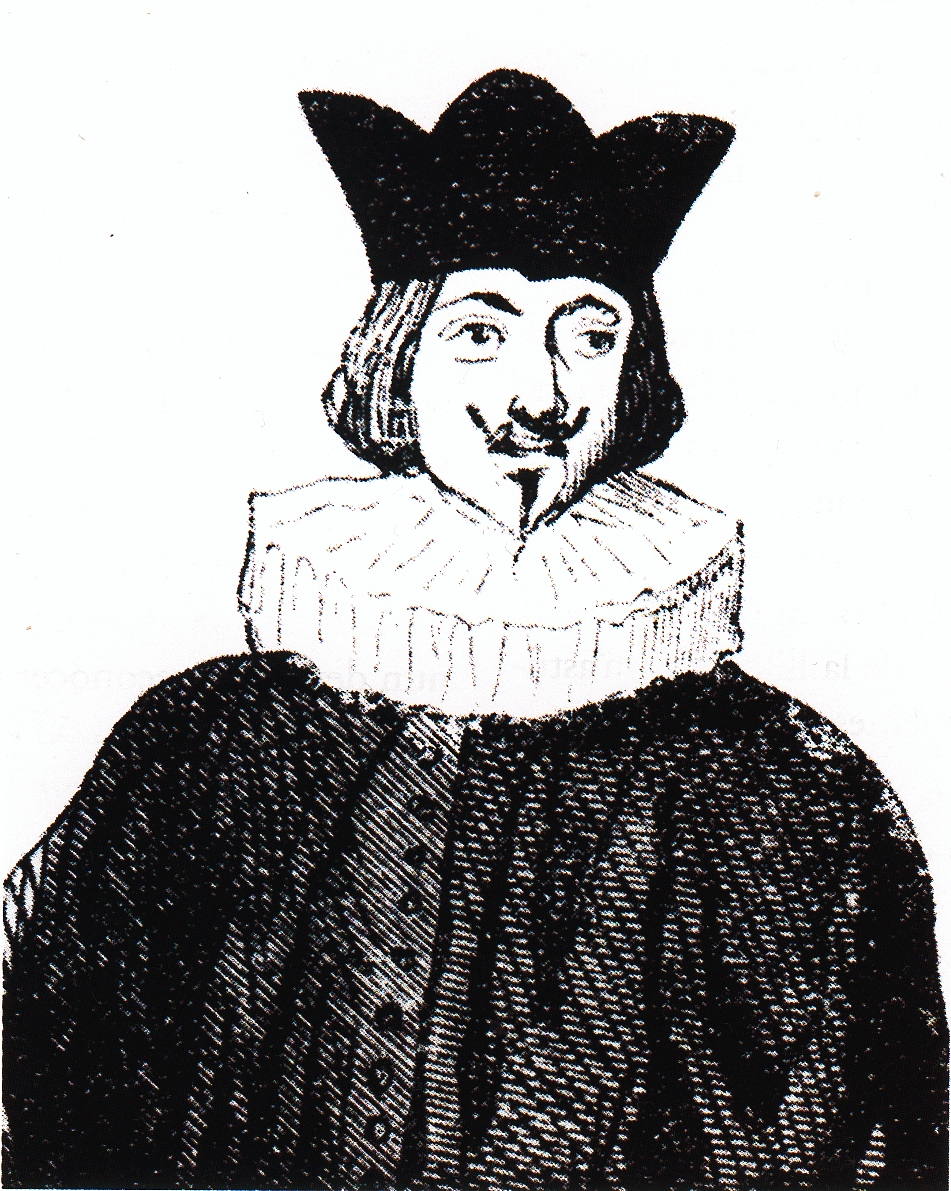
Idealized portrait of Antón de Marirreguera (17th century)

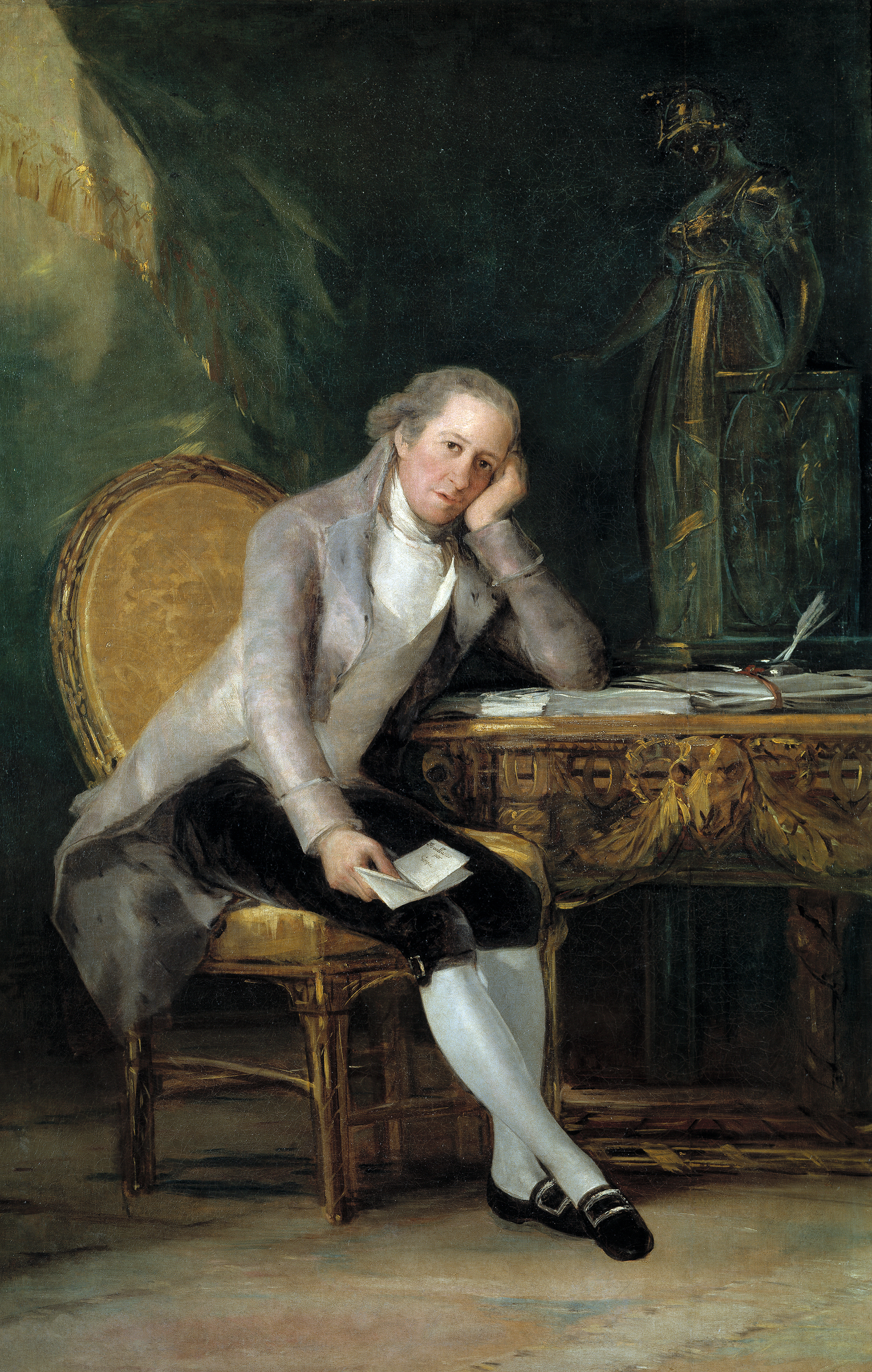
Gaspar Melchor de Jovellanos, writer, jurist and politician; neoclassical statesman (1744–1811), who projected the creation of an Academy of the Asturian Language

Asturian literature (Asturian: Lliteratura asturiana) is the writings in the Asturian language of the northwest Iberian Peninsula. The earliest documents date back to the 10th century, but the peak period of literary output was in the 18th century, with a late 20th century revival.

== Roots ==
Documents written in the Asturian language exist from as early as the 10th century, containing clear linguistic features of the language. However, significant numbers of documents in Asturian came into being only from the 13th century: writing by notaries, contracts, wills and the like. The importance of the Asturian language in the Middle Ages is revealed, for example, in the Fuero de Avilés (1085) (considered to be the first document written in Romanic) and the Fuero de Oviedo, in the Asturian version of the Fuero Juzgo as well.

All of these 13th century documents were legal in nature and contained laws for towns and cities or for the population at large. However, by the second half of the 16th century, documents were clearly coming to be written in the Castilian language, backed deliberately by the Trastámara Dynasty making the civil and ecclesiastical service of the Principality of Castilian origin. As a result, the Asturian language disappeared from written texts ('sieglos escuros' or Dark centuries) but continued to survive through oral transmission from generation to generation. The only reference to Asturian during this period is a work of Hernán Núñez (1555) about Proverbs and adages, "[...] ...in a large copy of rare languages, as Portuguese, Galician, Asturian, Catalan, Valencian, French, Tuscan..."

== Modernization ==
Modern Asturian literature was born in the 17th century with the works of clergyman Antón González Reguera. It continued through the 18th century, when it produced, according to Ruiz de la Peña, a literature that could stand up to the best written in the same period in the Castilian language from Asturias.

In the 18th century, the intellectual Gaspar Melchor de Jovellanos was conscious of the historical and cultural value of what he termed "our language" and expressed the urgency for the compilation of a dictionary and a grammar, and for the creation of a language academy. It took more than a century for the efforts of Asturian politicians to turn this into a reality.

The first Asturian narrative work printed independently was the 1875 novel Viaxe del tío Pacho el Sordo a Uviedo by Enriqueta González Rubín.

== Scholars ==
Other important writers were Francisco Bernaldo de Quirós Benavides, Xosefa Xovellanos, Xuan González Villar y Fuertes, Xosé Caveda y Nava, Xuan María Acebal, Teodoro Cuesta, Xosé Benigno García González, Marcos del Torniello, Bernardo Acevedo y Huelves, Pín de Pría, Galo Fernández, and Fernán Coronas.

In 1974, a symbolic year, a movement for the acceptance and usage of the language surfaced once again in Asturias. Based on the ideas of the Asturn association named Conceyu Bable regarding Asturian language and culture, an argument was devised for the acceptance and modernization of the language that led to the development of an official institution for establishing Asturian language norms. In 1980 the Academy of the Asturian Language was created with the approval of the Regional Council of Asturias (the transitory government body of Asturias).

Besides this, there was unprecedented literary activity, a production that breaks away from the system of subordination, of costumbrism and gender limitation, el Surdimientu (the Awakening). Authors such as Manuel Asur (Cancios y poemes pa un riscar), Xuan Bello (El llibru vieyu), Adolfo Camilo Díaz (Añada pa un güeyu muertu), Pablo Antón Marín Estrada (Les hores), Xandru Fernández (Les ruines), Lourdes Álvarez, Martín López-Vega, Miguel Rojo, Lluis Antón González and dozens more appeared, amongst others who wrote in the language of these territories in line with contemporary trends and guidelines, breaking away from the Asturian-Leonese tradition of rural themes, moral messages and dialogue-style writing, to put Asturian language literature on the map.

Nowadays the Asturian language is a living reality within the territory of Asturias, with about 150 annual publications, while small communities speaking Asturian can also be found in areas not administratively in the Principality.
