= List of Asturian-language authors =

This is a list, in chronological order, of writers in the Asturian language.

- Antón de Marirreguera (c. 1600 – c. 1662)
- Francisco Bernaldo de Quirós Benavides (1675–1710)
- Xosefa Xovellanos (1745–1807)
- Xuan María Acebal (1815–1895)
- Florina Alías (1921–1999)
- Manuel Asur (born 1947)
- María Esther García López (born 1948)
- Lluis Antón González (born 1955)
- Adolfo Camilo Díaz (born 1963)
- Aurelio González Ovies (born 1964)
- Xuan Bello (1965–2025)
- Pablo Antón Marín Estrada (born 1966)
- Xaviel Vilareyo (born 1967)
- Xandru Fernández (born 1970)
- Martín López-Vega (born 1975)
