= Asturian language =

Romance language of the West Iberian group

Asturian
- asturianu
- Native to: Spain
- Region: Asturias
- Ethnicity: Asturians
- Native speakers: (100,000, around 1/3 of Asturians, cited 2000); 62% of Asturians (2017)
- Language family: Indo-European: Italic; Latino-Faliscan; Latin; Romance; Italo-Western; Western; Iberian Romance; West Iberian; Asturleonese; Asturian
- Early forms: Old Latin: Vulgar Latin; Proto-Romance; Old Leonese
- Dialects: Western Asturian East Asturian
- Writing system: Latin

Official status
- Recognised minority language in: Asturias (Spain)
- Regulated by: Academia de la Llingua Asturiana

Language codes
- ISO 639-2: ast
- ISO 639-3: ast
- Glottolog: astu1245
- ELP: Asturian
- Linguasphere: 51-AAA-ca
- IETF: ast-u-sd-esas
- Linguistic area of Astur-Leonese, including Asturian

- Asturian is classified as Definitely Endangered by the UNESCO Atlas of the World's Languages in Danger

Victor Suárez speaking Asturian

Asturian (/æˈstʊəriən/; asturianu [astuˈɾjanʊ]) is a West Iberian Romance language spoken in the Principality of Asturias, Spain. Asturian is part of a wider linguistic group, the Asturleonese languages. The number of speakers is estimated at 100,000 (native) and 450,000 (second language). The dialects of the Astur-Leonese language family are traditionally classified in three groups: Western, Central, and Eastern. For historical and demographic reasons, the standard is based on Central Asturian. Asturian has a distinct grammar, dictionary, and orthography. It is regulated by the Academy of the Asturian Language. Although it is not an official language of Spain, it is protected under the Statute of Autonomy of Asturias and is an elective language in schools. For much of its history, the language has been ignored or "subjected to repeated challenges to its status as a language variety" due to its lack of official status.

== History ==
Kingdom of Asturias about 910 AD, after the reign of King Alfonso III of Asturias (848–910)

Asturian is the historical language of Asturias, portions of the Spanish provinces of León and Zamora and the area surrounding Miranda do Douro in northeastern Portugal. Like the other Romance languages of the Iberian peninsula, it evolved from Vulgar Latin during the early Middle Ages. Asturian was closely linked with the Kingdom of Asturias (718–910) and the ensuing Leonese kingdom. The language had contributions from pre-Roman languages spoken by the Astures, an Iberian Celtic tribe, and the post-Roman Germanic languages of the Visigoths and Suebians.

The transition from Latin to Asturian was slow and gradual; for a long time they co-existed in a diglossic relationship, first in the Kingdom of Asturias and later in that of Asturias and Leon. During the 12th, 13th and part of the 14th centuries Astur-Leonese was used in the kingdom's official documents, with many examples of agreements, donations, wills and commercial contracts from that period onwards. Although there are no extant literary works written in Asturian from this period, some books (such as the Llibru d'Alexandre and the 1155 Fueru d'Avilés) had Asturian sources.

Castilian Spanish arrived in the area during the 14th century, when the central administration sent emissaries and functionaries to political and ecclesiastical offices. Asturian codification of the Astur-Leonese spoken in the Asturian Autonomous Community became a modern language with the founding of the Academy of the Asturian Language (Academia Asturiana de la Llingua) in 1980. The Leonese dialects and Mirandese are linguistically close to Asturian.

== Status and legislation ==
Efforts have been made since the end of the Francoist period in 1975 to protect and promote Asturian. In 1994 there were 100,000 native speakers and 450,000 second-language speakers able to speak (or understand) Asturian. However, the language is endangered: there has been a steep decline in the number of speakers over the last century. Law 1/93 of 23 March 1993 on the Use and Promotion of the Asturian Language addressed the issue, and according to article four of the Asturias Statute of Autonomy: "The Asturian language will enjoy protection. Its use, teaching and diffusion in the media will be furthered, whilst its local dialects and voluntary apprenticeship will always be respected."

However, Asturian is in a legally hazy position. The Spanish Constitution has not been fully applied regarding the official recognition of languages in the autonomous communities. The ambiguity of the Statute of Autonomy, which recognises the existence of Asturian but does not give it the same status as Spanish, leaves the door open to benign neglect. However, since 1 August 2001 Asturian has been covered under the European Charter for Regional or Minority Languages' "safeguard and promote" clause.

A 1983 survey indicated 100,000 native Asturian speakers (12 percent of the Asturian population) and 250,000 who could speak or understand Asturian as a second language. A similar survey in 1991 found that 44 percent of the population (about 450,000 people) could speak Asturian, with from 60,000 to 80,000 able to read and write it. An additional 24 percent of the Asturian population said that they understood the language, making a total of about 68 percent of the Asturian population.

At the end of the 20th century the Academia de la Llingua Asturiana (Academy of the Asturian Language) attempted to provide the language with tools needed to promote its survival: a grammar, a dictionary and periodicals. In addition a new generation of Asturian writers has championed the language. In 2021 the first complete translation of the Bible into Asturian was published.

== Historical, social and cultural aspects ==
=== Literary history ===
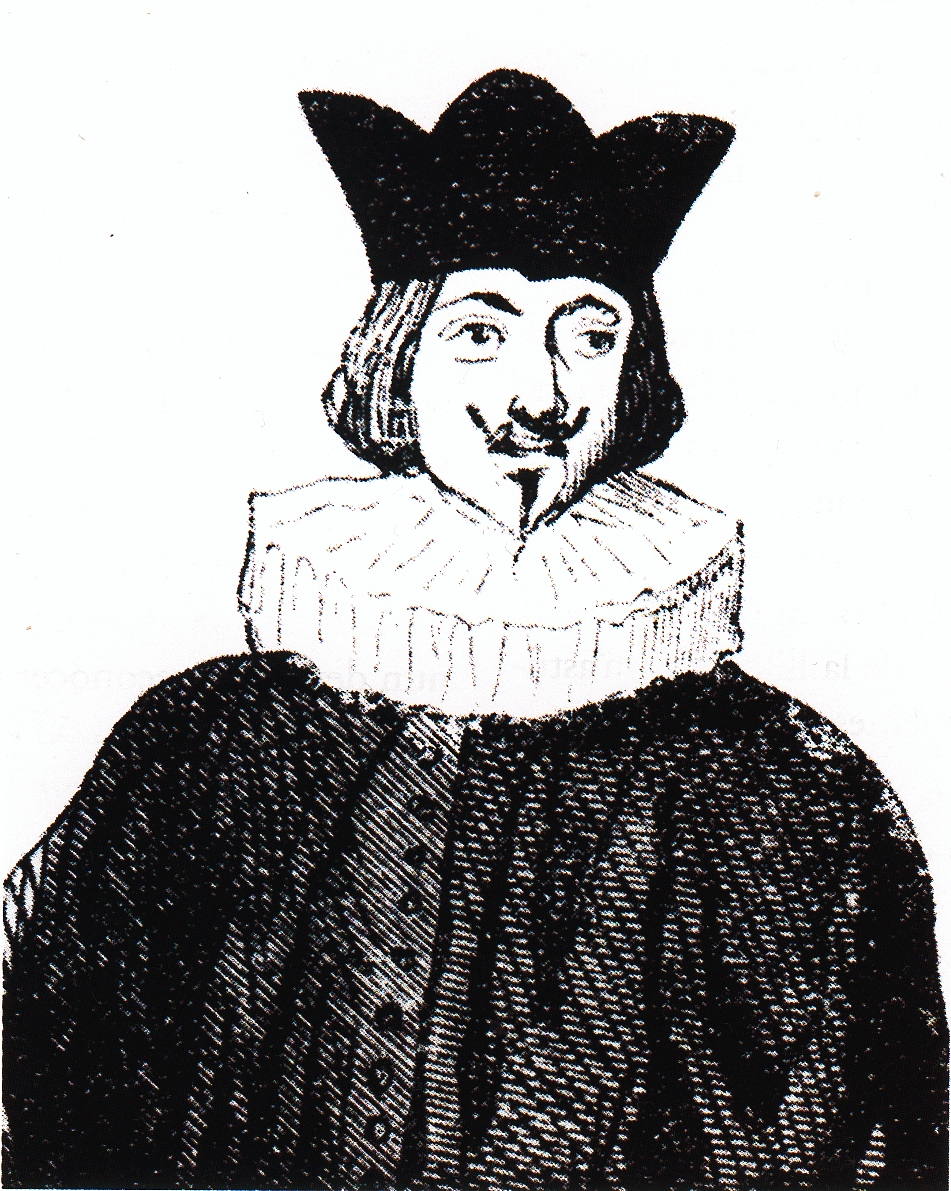
19th-century sketch of 17th-century author Antón de Marirreguera

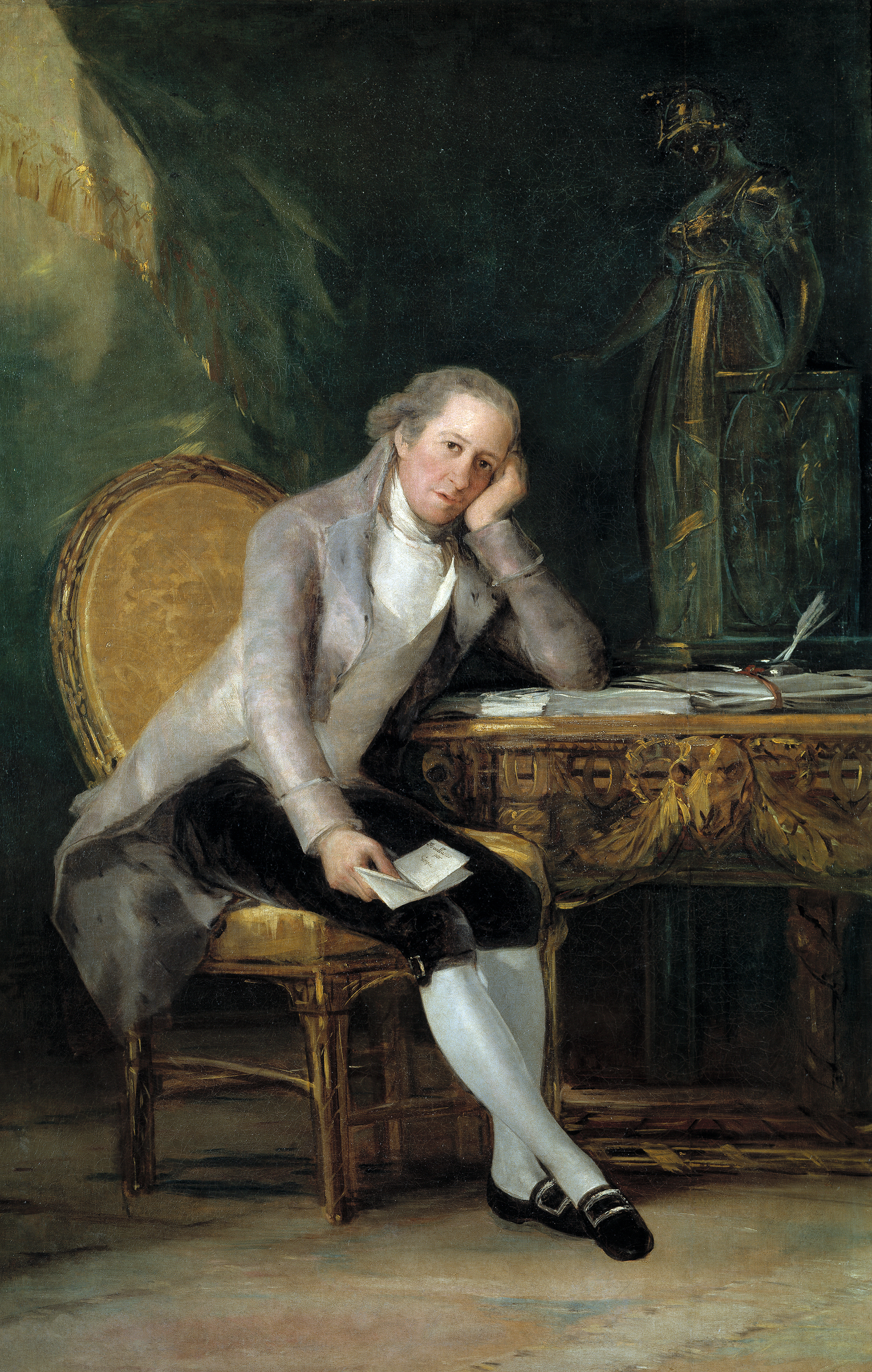
Jurist and neoclassical author Gaspar Melchor de Jovellanos (1744–1811), who envisaged the Academy of the Asturian Language

Although some 10th-century documents have the linguistic features of Asturian, numerous examples (such as writings by notaries, contracts and wills) begin in the 13th century. Early examples are the 1085 Fuero de Avilés (the oldest parchment preserved in Asturias) and the 13th-century Fuero de Oviedo and the Leonese version of the Fueru Xulgu.

The 13th-century documents were the laws for towns, cities and the general population. By the second half of the 16th century, documents were written in Castilian (i.e. Spanish), backed by the Trastámara dynasty and making the civil and ecclesiastical arms of the principality Castilian. Although the Asturian language disappeared from written texts during the sieglos escuros (dark centuries), it survived orally. The only written mention during this time is from a 1555 work by Hernán Núñez about proverbs and adages: "...in a large copy of rare languages, as Portuguese, Galician, Asturian, Catalan, Valencian, French, Tuscan..."

Modern Asturian literature began in 1605 with the clergyman Antón González Reguera and continued until the 18th century (when it produced, according to Ruiz de la Peña in 1981, a literature comparable to that in Asturias in Spanish). In 1744, Gaspar Melchor de Jovellanos wrote about the historic and cultural value of Asturian, urging the compilation of a dictionary and a grammar and the creation of a language academy. Notable writers included Francisco Bernaldo de Quirós Benavides (1675), Xosefa Xovellanos (1745), Xuan González Villar y Fuertes (1746), Xosé Caveda y Nava (1796), Xuan María Acebal (1815), Teodoro Cuesta (1829), Xosé Benigno García González, Marcos del Torniello (1853), Bernardo Acevedo y Huelves (1849), Pin de Pría (1864), Galo Fernández and Fernán Coronas (1884). During the 19th and early 20th century, sections of poems, comics, advertisement or commentary (often satirical) in Asturian were common in some regional Asturian newspapers and magazines, as well as in many costumbrist theater plays, but no newspaper would be completely written in Asturian until 1901.

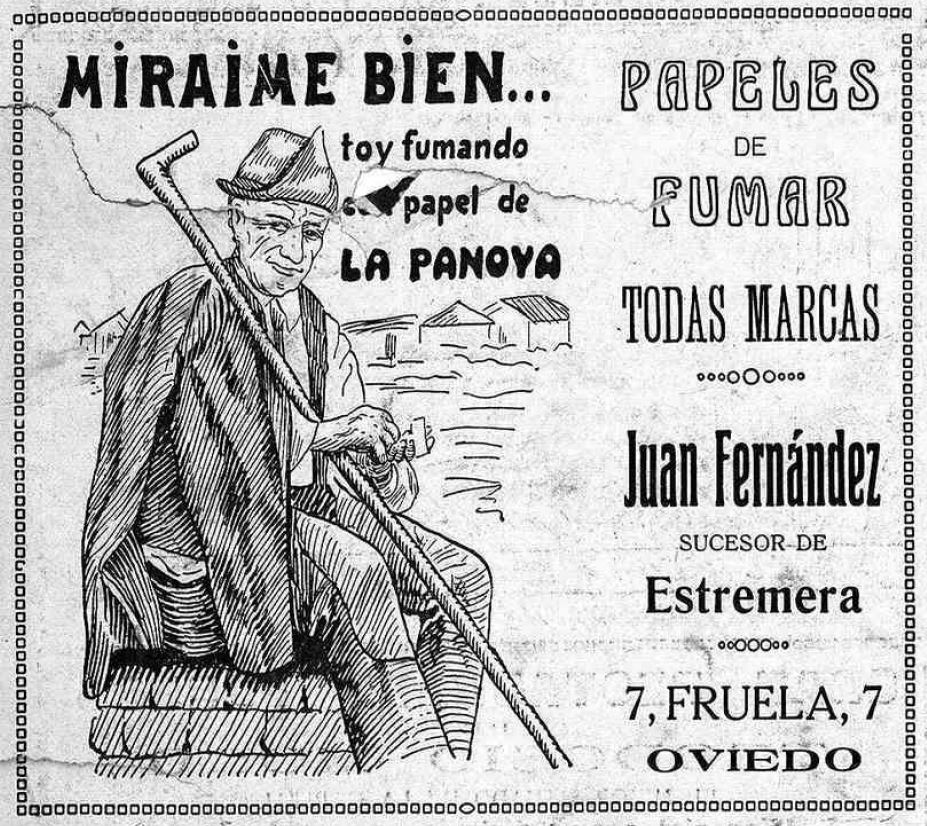
1918 example of the usage of Asturian in advertising, "Take a good look at me... I'm smoking with La Panoya rolling paper"

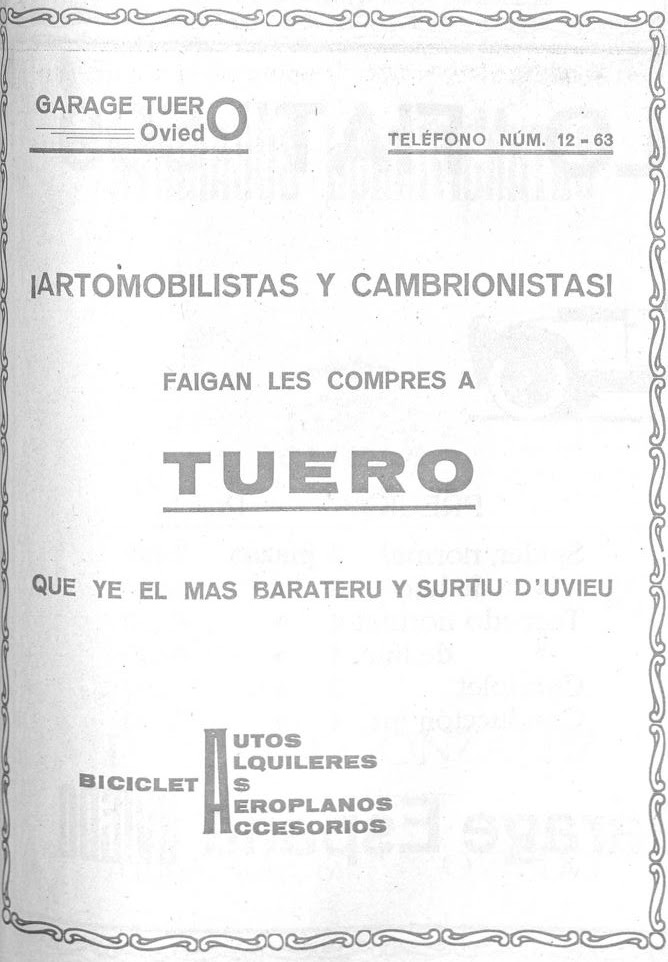
1926 example of the usage of Asturian language and toponym in advertising, "Motorists and Truckers! Make your purchases at Tuero, the cheapest and most assorted in Oviedo"

The first Asturian dictionary (Diccionario de algunas voces del dialecto asturiano) was written in 1788 by Carlos González de Posada.

Although the complete Bible was not translated until 2021, the Gospel of Matthew was translated to Asturian in London in 1861 by priest Manuel Fernández de Castro y Menéndez Hevia (who also translated papal bulls to Asturian) and published by Louis Lucien Bonaparte (who had also published a Galician translation of the Gospel).

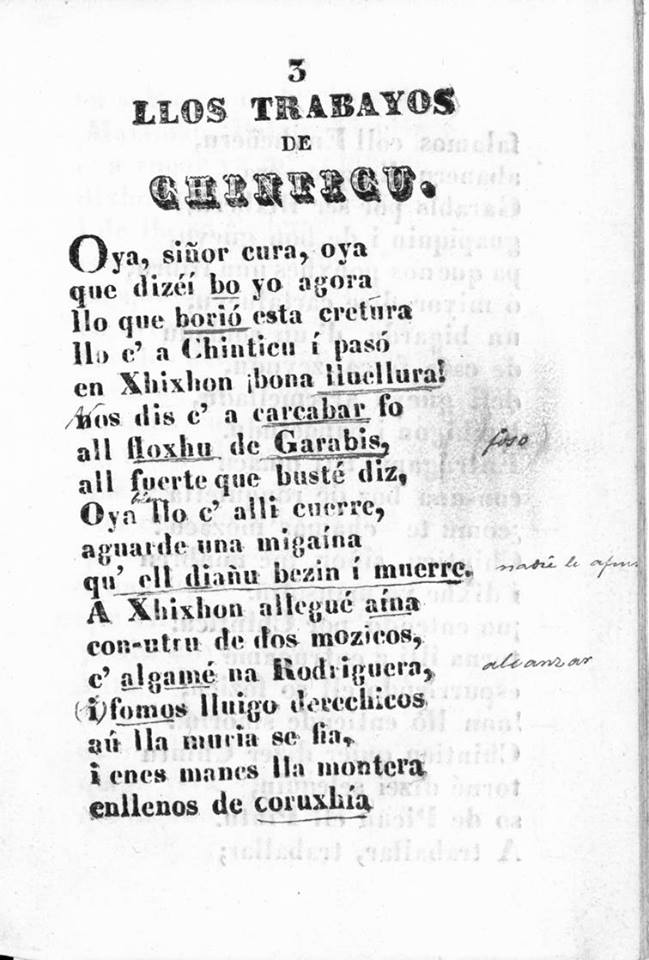
First page of Llos Trabayos de Chinticu (1843) in Junquera's peculiar orthography

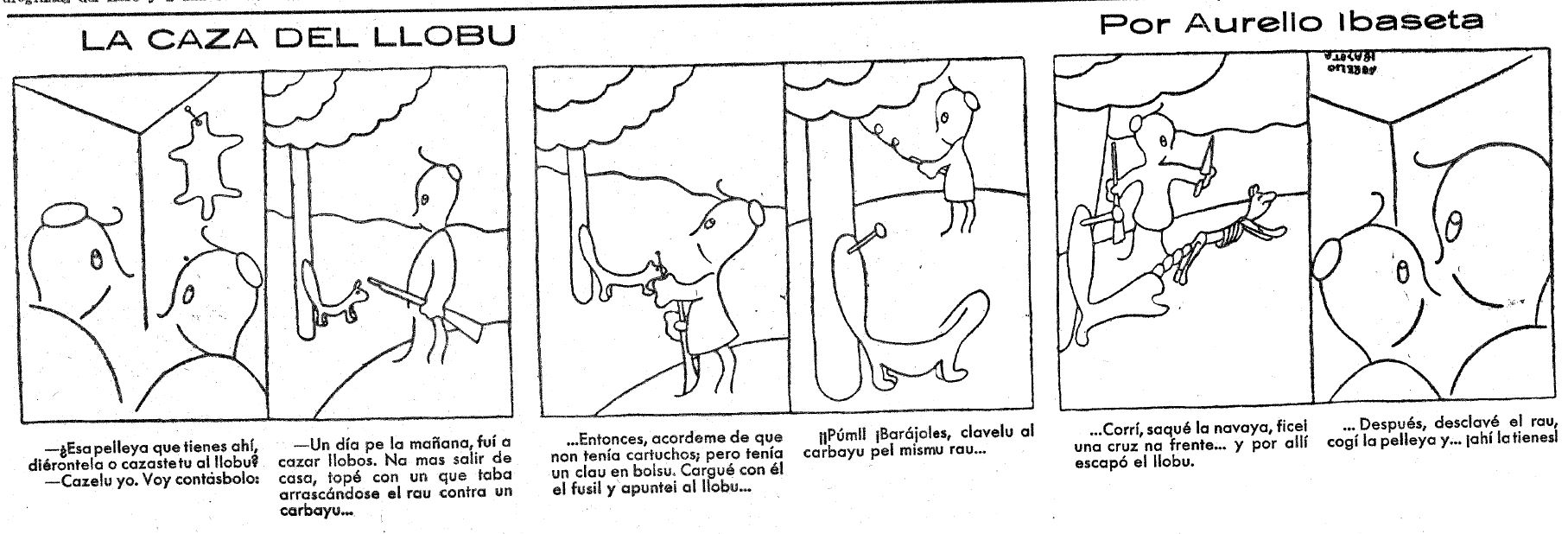
Comic strip in Asturian published in issue 2922 of La Prensa: diario independiente in 1930 by Aurelio Ibaseta

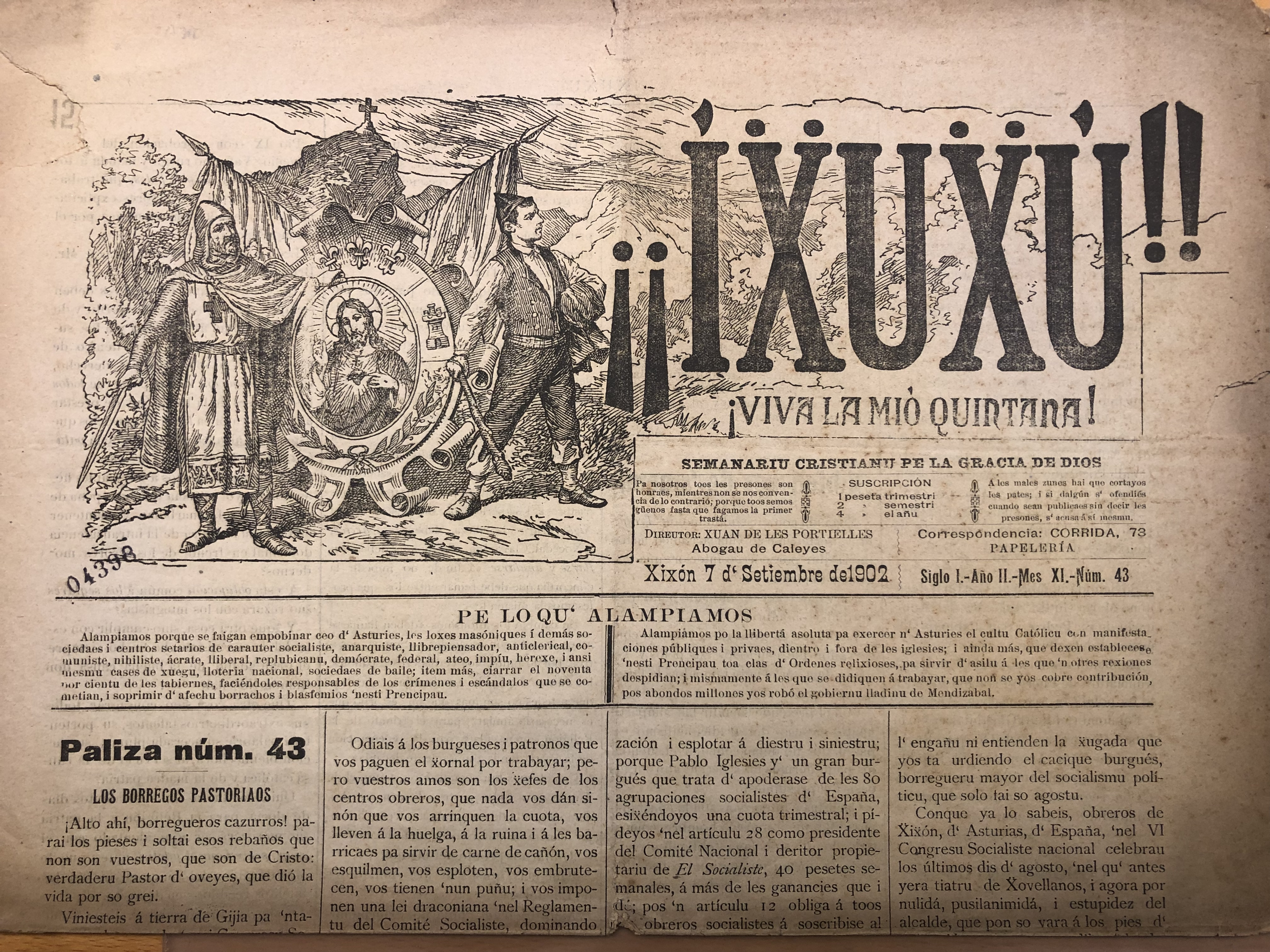
Front page of issue 43 of Ixuxú (7 September 1902)

The first book in Asturian printed and published was Llos Trabayos de Chinticu by Juan Junquera Huergo, published in Gijón in 1843 composed of 372 satirical verses. Junquera Huergo, former mayor of Gijón, also wrote the first Asturian grammar in 1869, using a writing standard invented by himself, but was left unpublished due to lack of funds after Junquera's death, and two dictionaries, a Diccionario del dialecto asturiano in 1867 and a Spanish-Asturian dictionary that was left uncompleted (only up to the letter "E"). In 1880 another very small dictionary would be written (Pequeño vocabulario de voces en bable), the writer is unknown, but it's attributed to José Fernández-Quevedo y González-Llanos alias "Pepín Quevedo".

The first novel in Asturian, Viaxe del Tíu Pacho el Sordu a Uviedo, was written and published in Oviedo by Enriqueta González Rubín in 1875 and written in the Eastern dialect of Asturian.

The first newspaper written completely in Asturian language, Ixuxú, was created by poet Francisco González Prieto in 1901 in Gijón. It was a conservative ultracatholic weekly newspaper. He also created another newspaper in Asturian, L'Astur in 1904.

Beginning in the 1930's and especially after Franco's victory in the Spanish Civil War and due to his policies against languages of Spain other than Spanish, Asturian presence as a written language was greatly diminished until the 1970s Surdimientu.

In 1974, a movement for the language's acceptance and use began in Asturias. Based on ideas of the Asturian association Conceyu Bable about Asturian language and culture, a plan was developed for the acceptance and modernization of the language that led to the 1980 creation of the Academy of the Asturian Language with the approval of the Asturias regional council. El Surdimientu (the Awakening) authors such as Manuel Asur (Cancios y poemes pa un riscar), Xuan Bello (El llibru vieyu), Adolfo Camilo Díaz (Añada pa un güeyu muertu), Pablo Antón Marín Estrada (Les hores), Xandru Fernández (Les ruines), Lourdes Álvarez, Martín López-Vega, Miguel Rojo and Lluis Antón González broke from the Asturian-Leonese tradition of rural themes, moral messages and dialogue-style writing. Currently, the Asturian language has about 150 annual publications. The Bible into the Asturian language was completed in 2021 after over 30 years of translation work, beginning in September 1988.

In recent years, “l'Espardimientu” (the Spreading or the Amusement), has emerged as a new generation of authors—primarily working in fantasy, science fiction, and horror—that explicitly breaks with the Surdimientu. According to the academic and literary critic Marta Mori, this generation is characterized by a more agile narrative pace, stories that are easily translatable into images and driven by dialogue, simpler archetypal characters closer to the axiological framework of traditional literature, and by the intention to create a fantastic imaginary with Asturian roots based on local mythology. Some authors associated with this generation include Nicolás Bardio, Adrián Carbayales, Xon de la Campa and Ana Pereira. Marta Mori considers Blanca Fernández Quintana to be one of the most prominent figures in this ongoing shift in Asturian literature. Together with these and other authors, a notable boom in fantasy literature written in Asturian can be observed.

=== Use and distribution ===
Astur-Leonese's geographic area exceeds Asturias, and the language known as Leonese in the autonomous community of Castile and León is basically the same as the Asturian spoken in Asturias. The Asturian-Leonese linguistic domain covers most of the principality of Asturias, the northern and western province of León, the northeastern province of Zamora (both in Castile and León), western Cantabria and the Miranda do Douro region in the eastern Bragança District of Portugal.

=== Toponymy ===
Asturian place-name status, 2017 Conceyos (municipalities) whose traditional place names have been codified Conceyos which have applied for approval Conceyos which have not applied

Traditional, popular place names of the principality's towns are supported by the law on usage of Asturian, the principality's 2003–07 plan for establishing the language and the work of the Xunta Asesora de Toponimia, which researches and confirms the Asturian names of requesting villages, towns, conceyos and cities (50 of 78 conceyos as of 2012).

== Dialects ==
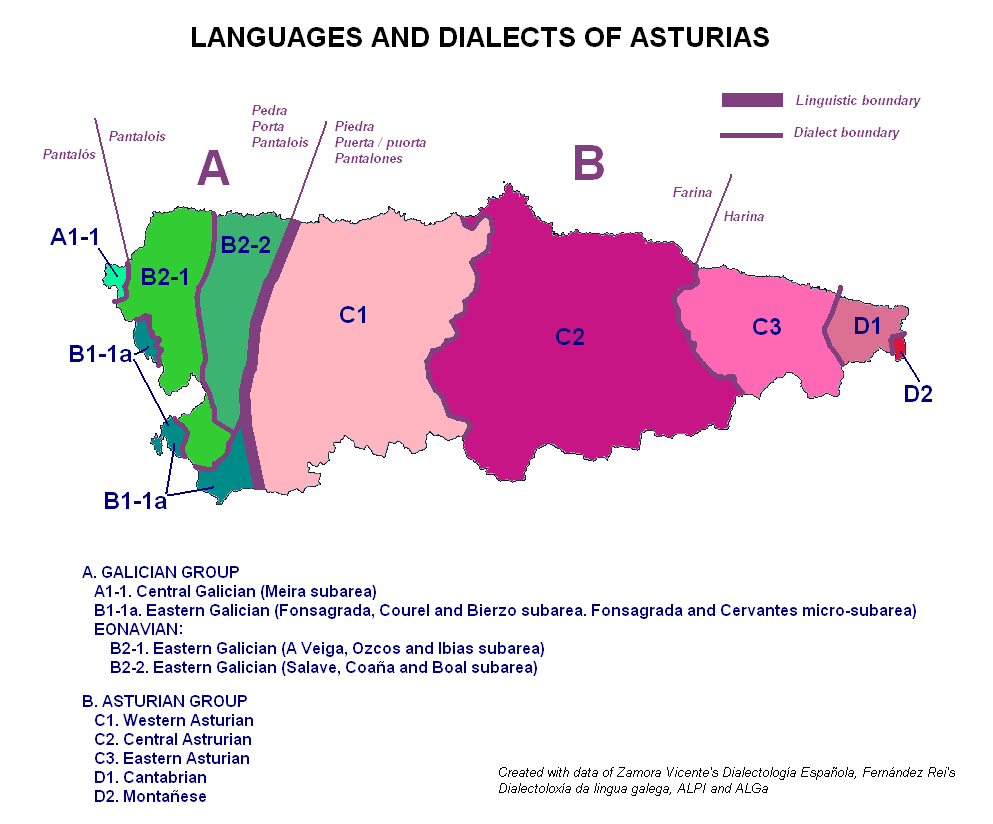
Asturian dialects: western, central and eastern

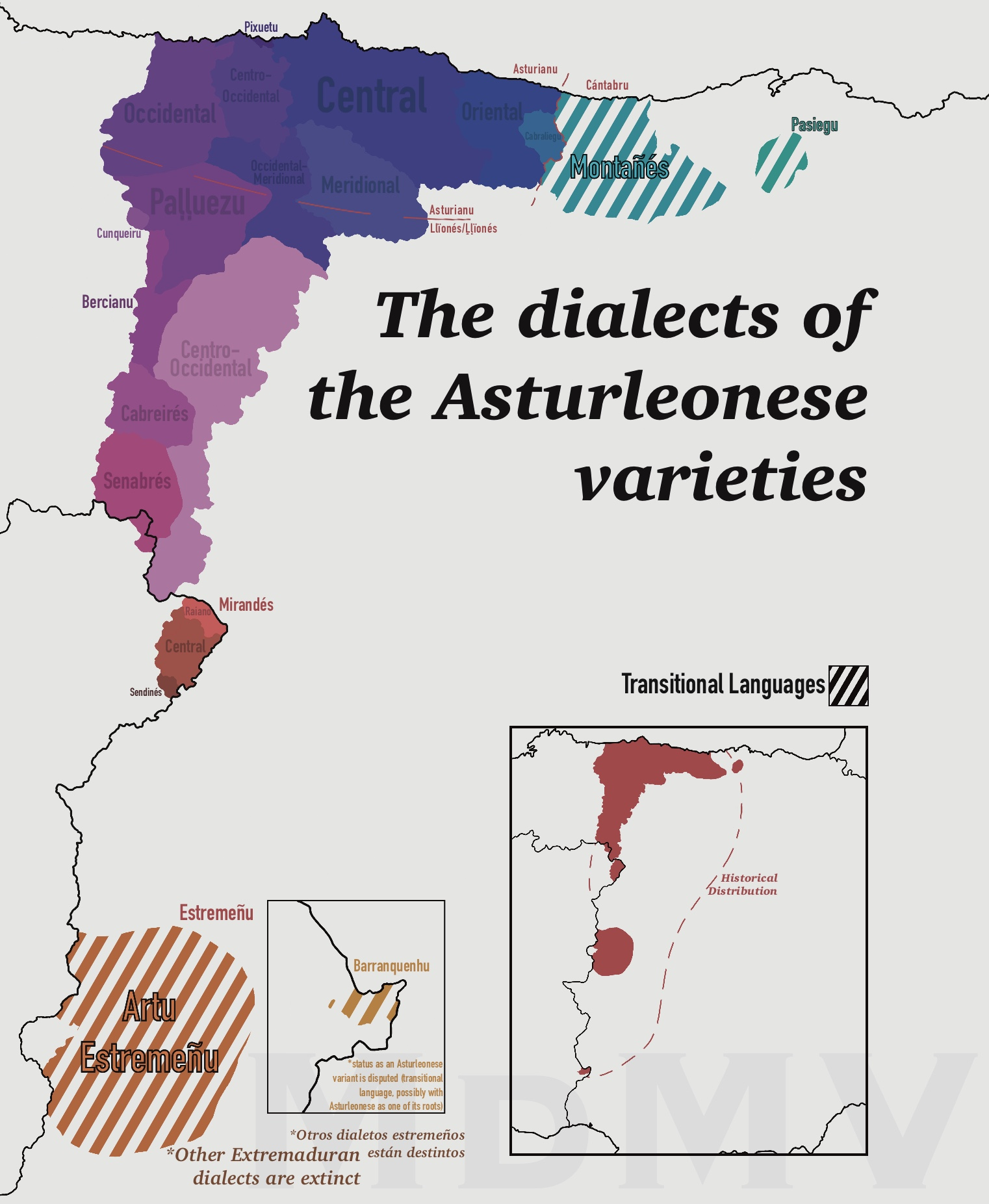
Current extent of the dialects of the Asturleonese variants, including Asturian

Asturian has several dialects. They are regulated by the Academia de la Llingua Asturiana and mainly spoken in Asturias (except in the west, where Galician-Asturian is spoken). The dialect spoken in the adjoining area of Castile and León is known as Leonese. Asturian is traditionally divided into three dialectal areas, sharing traits with the dialect spoken in León: western, central and eastern. The dialects are mutually intelligible. Central Asturian, with the most speakers (more than 80 percent), is the basis for standard Asturian. The first Asturian grammar was published in 1998 and the first dictionary in 2000.

Western Asturian is spoken between the rivers Navia and Nalón, in the west of the province of León (where it is known as Leonese) and in the provinces of Zamora and Salamanca. Feminine plurals end in -as and the falling diphthongs /ei/ and /ou/ are maintained.

Central Asturian is spoken between the Sella River and the mouth of the River Nalón in Asturias and north of León. The model for the written language, it is characterized by feminine plurals ending in -es, the monophthongization of /ou/ and /ei/ into /o/ and /e/ and the neuter gender in adjectives modifying uncountable nouns (lleche frío, carne tienro).

East Asturian is spoken between the River Sella, Llanes and Cabrales. The dialect is characterized by the debuccalization of word-initial /f/ to [h], written ⟨ḥ⟩ (ḥoguera, ḥacer, ḥigos and ḥornu instead of foguera, facer, figos and fornu; feminine plurals ending in -as (ḥabas, ḥormigas, ḥiyas, except in eastern towns, where -es is kept: ḥabes, ḥormigues, ḥiyes); the shifting of word-final -e to -i (xenti, tardi, ḥuenti); retention of the neuter gender in some areas, with the ending -u instead of -o (agua friu, xenti güenu, ropa tendíu, carne guisáu), and a distinction between direct and indirect objects in first- and second-person singular pronouns (direct me and te v. indirect mi and ti) in some municipalities bordering the Sella: busquéte (a ti) y alcontréte/busquéti les llaves y alcontrétiles, llévame (a mi) la fesoria en carru.

Asturian forms a dialect continuum with Cantabrian in the east and Eonavian in the west. While this dialect continuum is for the most part smooth, a number of isoglosses cluster together parallel to the River Purón, linking the dialects of eastern Llanes, Ribadedeva, Peñamellera Alta, and Peñamellera Baja with those of Cantabria and separating them from the rest of Asturias. Cantabrian was listed in the 2009 UNESCO Atlas of the World's Languages in Danger. The inclusion of Eonavian (spoken in western Asturias, bordering Galicia) in the Galician language is controversial, since it has traits in common with western Asturian.

== Description ==
Asturian is one of the Astur-Leonese languages which form part of the Iberian Romance languages, close to Galician-Portuguese and Castilian and further removed from Navarro-Aragonese. It is an inflecting, fusional, head-initial and dependent-marking language. Its word order is subject–verb–object (in declarative sentences without topicalization).

== Phonology ==
=== Vowels ===
Asturian distinguishes five vowel phonemes (these same ones are found in Spanish, Aragonese, Sardinian and Basque), according to three degrees of vowel openness (close, mid and open) and backness (front, central and back). Many Asturian dialects have a system of metaphony.

	Front	Back
Close	i	u
Mid	e	o
Open	a	

- When occurring as unstressed, close vowels /i u/ can become glides [j w] in the pre-nuclear position. In the post-nuclear syllable margin, they are traditionally transcribed as non-syllabic vowels [i̯ u̯].

The phenomenon of -u metaphony is uncommon, as are the falling diphthongs /ei, ou/, usually in the west.

=== Consonants ===
		Labial	Dental	Alveolar	Palatal	Velar
Plosive/ affricate	voiceless	p	t		tʃ	k
Plosive/ affricate	voiced	b	d		ʝ	ɡ
Fricative		f	θ	s	ʃ	
Nasal		m		n	ɲ	
Lateral				l	ʎ	
Trill				r		
Tap				ɾ		

- Some dialects also have sounds ḷḷ, ḥ which are pronounced as /t͡s~ʈ͡ʂ~ɖ͡ʐ~ɖ/ and /x~h/
- /b, d, ɡ/ may be lenited or sonorised as [β, ð, ɣ] in certain environments, or word-initially.
- /n/ is pronounced [ŋ] in coda position.
- /ʝ/ can have different pronunciations, as a voiced plosive [ɟ], affricate [ɟ͡ʝ], or as a voiced fricative [ʝ].

== Orthography ==
Asturian has always been written in the Latin alphabet. Although the Academia de la Llingua Asturiana published orthographic rules in 1981, different spelling rules are used in Terra de Miranda (Portugal).

Although they can be written, ḷḷ (che vaqueira, formerly written "ts") and the eastern ḥ aspiration (also written "h." and cooccurring with ll and f) are absent from this model. Asturian has triple gender distinction in the adjective, feminine plurals with -es, verb endings with -es, -en, -íes, íen and lacks compound tenses (or periphrasis constructed with "tener").

=== Alphabet ===
Graphemes
Uppercase	A	B	C	D	E	F	G	H	I	L	M	N	Ñ	O	P	Q	R	S	T	U	V	X	Y	Z
Lowercase	a	b	c	d	e	f	g	h	i	l	m	n	ñ	o	p	q	r	s	t	u	v	x	y	z
Name	a	be	ce	de	e	efe	gue	hache	i	ele	eme	ene	eñe	o	pe	cu	erre	ese	te	u	uve	xe	ye	zeta (*)
Phoneme	/a/	/b/	/θ/, /k/	/d/	/e/	/f/	/ɡ/	∅	/i/	/l/	/m/	/n/	/ɲ/	/o/	/p/	/k/	/r/, /ɾ/	/s/	/t/	/u/	/b/	/ʃ/, /(k)s/	/ʝ/	/θ/

(*) also zeda, ceda

The letters K (ka), J (jota) and W (uve doble) are only used in loanwords and are not part of the alphabet.

=== Digraphs ===
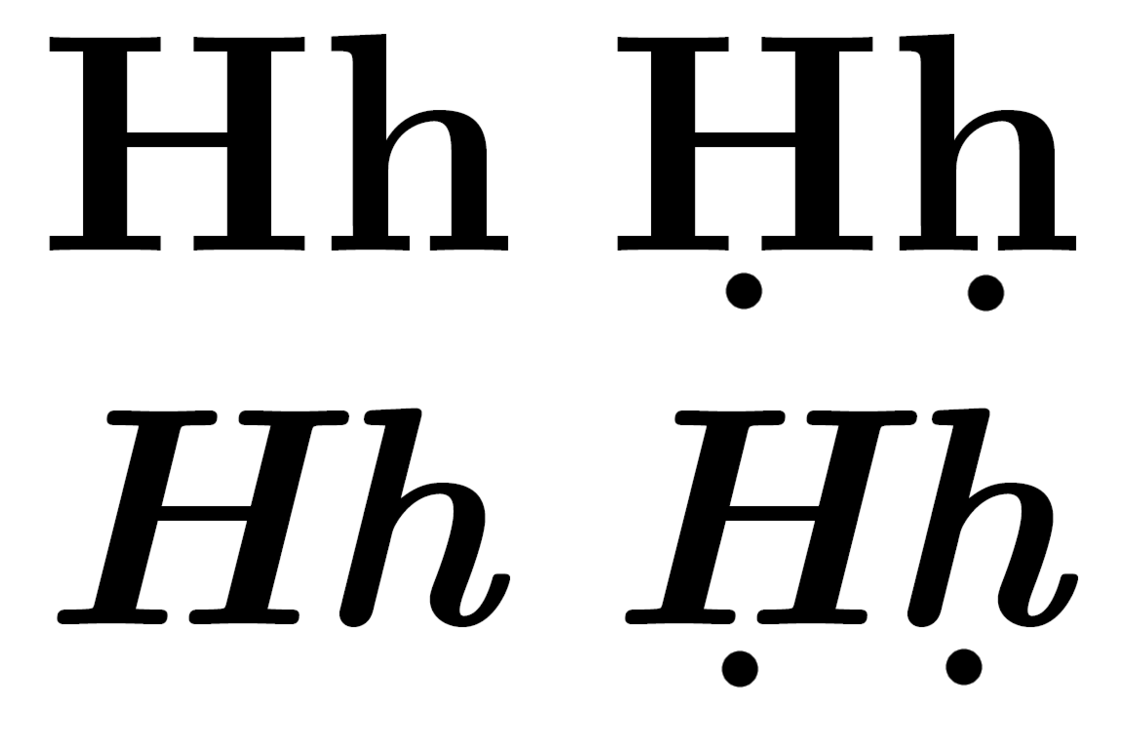
Asturian H and Ḥ

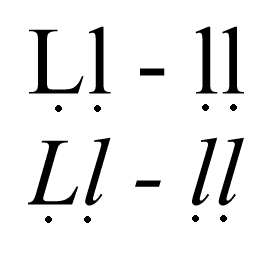
Asturian Ḷ

Asturian has several digraphs, some of which have their own names.

Digraph	Name	Phoneme
ch	che	/t͡ʃ/
gu (+ e, i)	(gue u)	/ɡ/
ll	elle	/ʎ/
qu (+ e, i)	(cu u)	/k/
rr	(erre doble)	/r/
ts	(te ese)	/t͡s/ (dialectal)
yy	(ye doble)	/ɟ͡ʝ/ (dialectal)

=== Dialectal spellings ===
The letter h and the digraph ll can take an under-dot to indicate additional sounds, for ḥ and digraph ḷḷ

Normal	Pronunciation	Dotted	Pronunciation	Examples
ll	[ʎ]	ḷḷ	[ts], [ɖʐ], [ɖ] or [ʈʂ]	ḷḷeite, ḷḷinu
h	∅	ḥ	[h] or [x]	ḥou, ḥenu, ḥuera

- The "ḥ" is common in eastern Asturian place names and in words beginning with f; workarounds such as h. and l.l were used in the past for printing.
- Besides dialectal words, the "ḥ" is also used in some loanwords: ḥoquei (hockey).

== Grammar ==
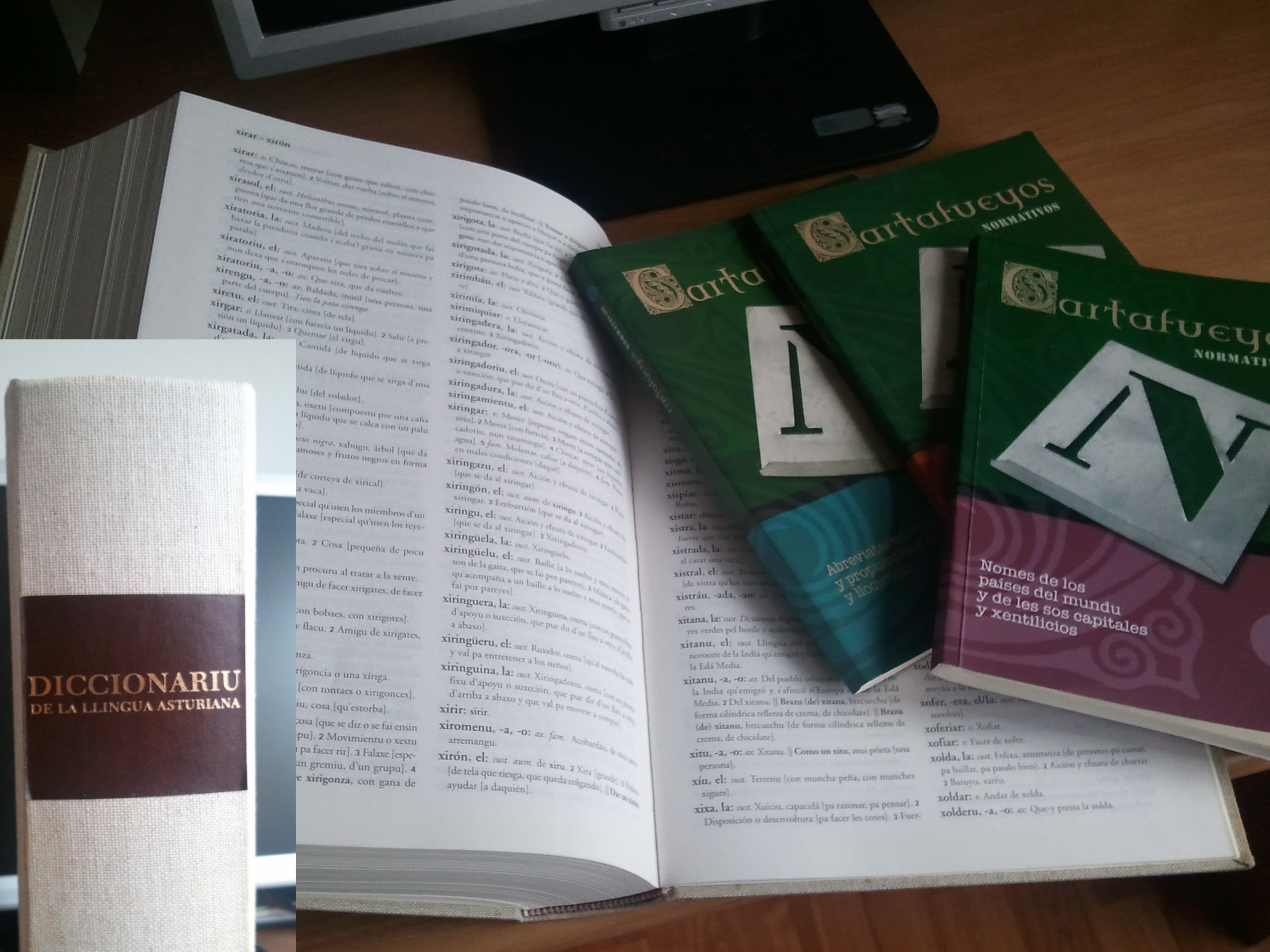
Asturian dictionary, published by the Academy of the Asturian Language

Asturian grammar is similar to that of other Romance languages. Nouns have three genders (masculine, feminine and neuter), two numbers (singular and plural) and no cases. Adjectives may have a third, neuter gender, a phenomenon known as matter-neutrality. Verbs agree with their subjects in person (first, second, or third) and number, and are conjugated to indicate mood (indicative, subjunctive, conditional or imperative; some others include "potential" in place of future and conditional), tense (often present or past; different moods allow different tenses), and aspect (perfective or imperfective).

=== Gender ===
Asturian is the only western Romance language with three genders: masculine, feminine and neuter.

- Masculine nouns usually end in -u, sometimes in -e or a consonant: el tiempu (time, weather), l’home (man), el pantalón (trousers), el xeitu (way, mode).
- Feminine nouns usually end in -a, sometimes -e: la casa (house), la xente (people), la nueche (night).
- Neuter nouns may have any ending. Asturian has three types of neuters:
  - Masculine neuters have a masculine form and take a masculine article: el fierro vieyo (old iron).
  - Feminine neuters have a feminine form and take a feminine article: la lleche frío (cold milk).
  - Pure neuters are nominal groups with an adjective and neuter pronoun: lo guapo d’esti asuntu ye... (the interesting [thing] about this issue is...).

Adjectives are modified by gender. Most adjectives have three endings: -u (masculine), -a (feminine) and -o (neuter): El vasu ta fríu (the glass is cold), tengo la mano fría (my hand is cold), l’agua ta frío (the water is cold)

Neuter nouns are abstract, collective and uncountable nouns. They have no plural, except when they are used metaphorically or concretised and lose this gender: les agües tán fríes (Waters are cold). Tien el pelo roxo (He has red hair) is neuter, but Tien un pelu roxu (He has a red hair) is masculine; note the noun's change in ending.

=== Number ===
Plural formation is complex:

- Masculine nouns ending in -u → -os: texu (yew) → texos.
- Feminine nouns ending in -a → -es: vaca (cow) → vaques.
- Masculine or feminine nouns ending in a consonant take -es: animal (animal) → animales; xabón (soap) → xabones.
- Words ending in -z may take a masculine -os to distinguish them from the feminine plural: rapaz (boy) → rapazos; rapaza (girl) → rapaces.
- Masculine nouns ending in -ín → -inos: camín (way, path) → caminos, re-establishing the etymological vowel.
- Feminine nouns ending in -á, -ada, -ú → -aes or -úes, also re-establishing the etymological vowel: ciudá (city) → ciudaes; cansada (tired [feminine]) → cansaes; virtú (virtue) → virtúes.

=== Determiners ===
Their forms are:

Definite article
	Singular			Plural	
	masc.	fem.	neuter	masc.	fem.
Before cons	el	la	lo	los	les
Before vowel	l'	la / l' ^{*}	lo	los	les

Indefinite article
Singular		Plural	
masc.	fem.	masc.	fem.
un	una	unos	unes

^{*}Only before words beginning with a-: l’aigla (the eagle), l’alma (the soul). Compare la entrada (the entry) and la islla (the island).

=== Resources ===
The Academy of the Asturian Language has published a grammar describing the Asturian language. It is a comprehensive manual that can be used in schools to facilitate learning.

Additionally, a translator that can translate English, French, Portuguese and Italian, among a few other languages, into Asturian and vice versa is offered online. This software is funded and maintained by members of the University of Oviedo.

== Vocabulary ==
As with other Romance languages, most Asturian words come from Latin: ablana, agua, falar, güeyu, home, llibru, muyer, pesllar, pexe, prau, suañar. In addition to this Latin basis are words which entered Asturian from languages spoken before the arrival of Latin (its substratum), afterwards (its superstratum) and loanwords from other languages.

=== Substratum ===
Although little is known about the language of the ancient Astures, it may have been related to two Indo-European languages: Celtic and Lusitanian. Words from this language and the pre–Indo-European languages spoken in the region are known as the prelatinian substratum; examples include bedul, boroña, brincar, bruxa, cándanu, cantu, carrascu, comba, cuetu, güelga, llamuerga, llastra, llócara, matu, peñera, riega, tapín and zucar. Many Celtic words (such as bragues, camisa, carru, cerveza and sayu) were integrated into Latin and, later, into Asturian.

=== Superstratum ===
Asturian's superstratum consists primarily of Germanisms and Arabisms. The Germanic peoples in the Iberian Peninsula, especially the Visigoths and the Suevi, added words such as blancu, esquila, estaca, mofu, serón, espetar, gadañu and tosquilar. Arabisms could reach Asturian directly, through contacts with Arabs or al-Andalus, or through the Castilian language. Examples include acebache, alfaya, altafarra, bañal, ferre, galbana, mandil, safase, xabalín, zuna and zucre.

=== Loanwords ===
Asturian has also received much of its lexicon from other languages, such as Spanish, French, Occitan and Galician. In number of loanwords, Spanish leads the list. However, due to the close relationship between Castilian and Asturian, it is often unclear if a word is borrowed from Castilian, common to both languages from Latin, or a loanword from Asturian to Castilian. Some Castilian forms in Asturian are:

Loans
Spanish	echar, antoxu, guerrilla, xamón, siesta, rexa, vainilla, xaréu
Galician	cachelos, chombada, quimada
French	arranchar, chalana, xofer, espáis, foina, galipote, malvís, pote, sable, somier, tolete, vagamar, xarré
Occitan	hostal, parrocha, tolla

Evolution from Latin to Galician, Asturian, and Spanish
Latin	Galician	Asturian	Spanish
Diphthongization of Ŏ & Ĕ
PŎRTA(M) (door)	porta	puerta	puerta
ŎCŬLU(M) (eye)	ollo	güeyu güechu	ojo
TĔMPUS, TĔMPŎR- (time)	tempo	tiempu	tiempo
TĔRRA(M) (land)	terra	tierra	tierra
Rising diphthongs
CAUSA(M) (cause)	cousa	co(u)sa	cosa
FERRARĬU(M) (smith)	ferreiro	ferre(i)ru	herrero
N- (initial position)
NATIVITĀTE(M) (Christmas)	nadal	nadal ñavidá	navidad
F- (initial position)
FACĔRE (to do)	facer	facer(e)	hacer
FĔRRU(M) (iron)	ferro	fierru	hierro
L- (initial position)
LARE(M) (home)	lar	llar ḷḷar	lar
LŬPU(M) (wolf)	lobo	llobu ḷḷobu	lobo
Palatalization of PL-, CL-, FL-
PLĀNU(M) (plane)	chan	ḷḷanu llanu	llano
CLĀVE(M) (key)	chave	ḷḷave llave	llave
FLĂMMA(M) (flame)	chama	ḷḷama llama	llama
-N- (intervocalic position)
RĀNA(M) (frog)	ra	rana	rana
Palatalization of -CT- & -LT-
FĂCTU(M) (fact)	feito	feitu fechu	hecho
NŎCTE(M) (night)	noite	nueite nueche	noche
MŬLTU(M) (much)	muito	muncho	mucho
AUSCULTĀRE (to listen)	escoitar	escuchar	escuchar
Groups -C'L-, -T'L-, -G'L-
NOVACŬLA(M) (penknife)	navalla	navaya	navaja
VETŬLU(M) (old)	vello	vieyu	viejo
TEGŬLA(M) (tile)	tella	teya	teja
Group -LY-
MULĬERE(M) (woman)	muller	muyer	mujer
-LL-
CASTĔLLU(M) (castle)	castelo	castiellu castieḷḷu	castillo
-L- (intervocalic position)
GĔLU(M) (ice)	xeo	xelu	hielo
FILĬCTU(M) (fern)	fieito	felechu	helecho
Group -M'N-
HŎMĬNE(M) (man)	home	home	hombre
FĂMEM > *FĂMĬNE (hunger, famine)	fame	fame	hambre
LŪMEN > *LŪMĬNE (fire)	lume	llume ḷḷume	lumbre

== Lexical comparison ==
=== Lord's Prayer ===
Galician	Asturian	Spanish	Latin
Noso Pai que estás no ceo:	Pá nuesu que tas nel cielu,	Padre nuestro que estás en los cielos,	Pater noster, qui es in caelis,
santificado sexa o teu nome, veña a nós o teu reino e fágase a túa vontade aquí na terra coma no ceo.	santificáu seya'l to nome. Amiye'l to reinu, fágase la to voluntá, lo mesmo na tierra que'n cielu.	santificado sea tu Nombre, venga a nosotros tu reino y hágase tu voluntad en la tierra como en el cielo.	Sanctificetur nomen tuum. Adveniat regnum tuum. Fiat voluntas tua, Sicut in caelo et in terra.
O noso pan cotián dánolo hoxe;	El nuesu pan cotidianu dánoslu güei	Danos hoy nuestro pan de cada día;	Panem nostrum quotidianum da nobis hodie.
e perdóanos as nosas ofensas como tamén perdoamos nós a quen nos ten ofendido;	ya perdónanos les nueses ofenses, lo mesmo que nós facemos colos que nos faltaron.	y perdónanos nuestras ofensas como también nosotros perdonamos a los que nos ofenden;	Et dimitte nobis debita nostra, Sicut et nos dimittimus debitoribus nostris.
e non nos deixes caer na tentación, mais líbranos do mal.	Nun nos dexes cayer na tentación, ya llíbranos del mal.	y no nos dejes caer en tentación, sino líbranos del mal.	Et ne nos inducas in tentationem: Sed libera nos a malo.
Amén.	Amén.	Amén.	Amen.

== Education ==
=== Primary and secondary ===
Although Spanish is the official language of all schools in Asturias, in many schools children are allowed to take Asturian-language classes from age 6 to 16. Elective classes are also offered from 16 to 19. Central Asturias (Nalón and Caudal comarcas) has the largest percentage of Asturian-language students, with almost 80 percent of primary-school students and 30 percent of secondary-school students in Asturian classes. Xixón, Uviéu, Eo-Navia and Oriente also have an increased number of students.

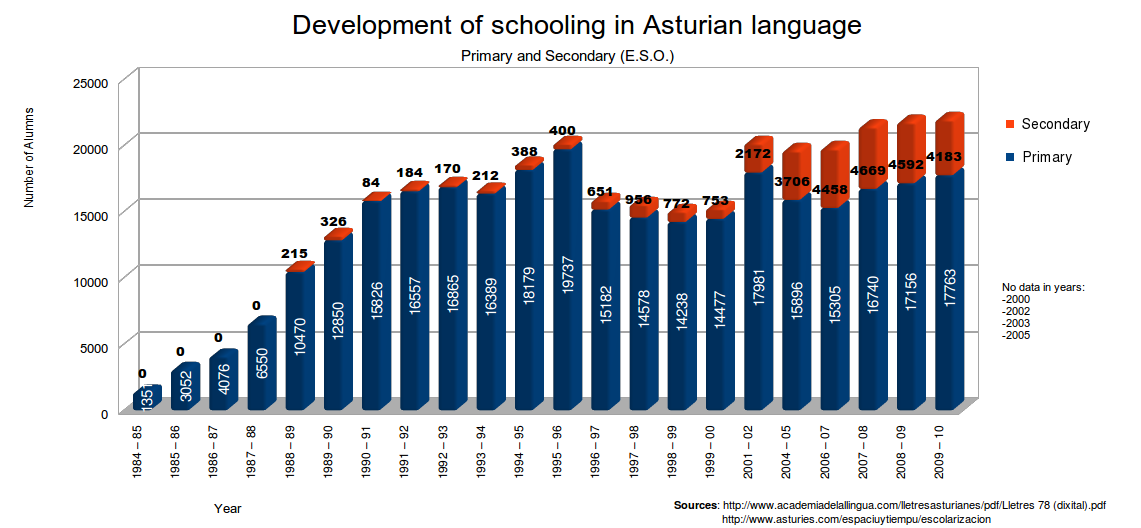
Development of Asturian-language education

=== University ===
According to article six of the University of Oviedo charter, "The Asturian language will be the object of study, teaching and research in the corresponding fields. Likewise, its use will have the treatment established by the Statute of Autonomy and complementary legislation, guaranteeing non-discrimination of those who use it."

Asturian can be used at the university in accordance with the Use of Asturian Act. University records indicate an increased number of courses and amount of scientific work using Asturian, with courses in the Department of Philology and Educational Sciences. In accordance with the Bologna Process, Asturian philology will be available for study and teachers will be able to specialise in the Asturian language at the University of Oviedo.

== Internet ==
Asturian government websites, council webpages, blogs, and entertainment webpages exist. Free software is offered in Asturian, and Ubuntu offers Asturian as an operating-system language. Free software in the language is available from Debian, Fedora, Firefox, Thunderbird, LibreOffice, VLC, GNOME, Chromium and KDE. Minecraft also has an Asturian translation.

Wikipedia offers an Asturian version of itself, with 136,000+ pages as of November 2024.

== See also ==
- Leonese language
- Mirandese language
- List of Asturian language authors
- Extremaduran language
- Ramón Menéndez Pidal
- Category:Asturian-language software in the Asturian Wikipedia

== Bibliography ==
- Bauske, Bernd (1995). Sprachplanung des Asturianischen : die Normierung und Normalisierung einer romanischen Kleinsprache im Spannungsfeld von Linguistik, Literatur und Politik (in German). Berlin: Dr. Köster. ISBN 978-3895740572.
- Llera Ramo, Francisco (1994). Los asturianos y la lengua asturiana : estudio sociolingüístico para Asturias, 1991 (in Spanish). Uviéu [Spain]: Principau dʼAsturies, Conseyería dʼEducación, Cultura, Deportes y Xuventu. ISBN 84-7847-297-5.
- Penny, Ralph J. (2000). Variation and change in Spanish. Cambridge: Cambridge University Press. doi:10.1017/CBO9781139164566. ISBN 0521780454.
- Wurm, Stephen A. (ed) (2001) Atlas of the World's Languages in Danger of Disappearing. Unesco ISBN 92-3-103798-6.
- (in English) M.Teresa Turell (2001). Multilingualism in Spain: Sociolinguistic and Psycholinguistic Aspects of Linguistic Minority Groups. ISBN 1-85359-491-1
- (in English) Mercator-Education (2002): European Network for Regional or Minority Languages and Education. "The Asturian language in education in Spain" ISSN 1570-1239
