= Adolfo Camilo Díaz =

Spanish writer

Adolfo Camilo Díaz López (born 1963 in Caborana, Aller, Asturias) is a Spanish writer in asturian language. He is specially known as a playwright and author of short novels. He had achieved some of the most important prizes of the Asturian literature, as the Xosefa Xovellanos of novel (twice, in 1985 and 1995) or the short novel prize of the Academia de la Llingua Asturiana.

== Life ==
Adolfo Camilo Díaz studied History in the University of Oviedo. In 1979 he founded the experimental theatre group "Güestia", where he met Xuan Bello. The group was dissolved, and become a rock band with the same name, publishing a disc named Inaux. Later, in 1984, he formed up the drama collective "Amorecer", that played some spectacles. The most important one was El suañu la razón ('The Reason's Dream'), of 1985, based on texts of Goethe, Franz Kafka, Manuel Martínez Mediero as well as some of his own texts. He worked as a cultural entertainer in the municipalities of Carreño and Corvera and, since 2004, he is the cultural director of the city council of Avilés. He is also part of the Administration Council of the Radiotelevisión del Principado de Asturias. He founded the literature magazine "Al Bellume" (published between 1986 and 1989). Besides, he collaborates usually with newspapers as La Nueva España and Les Noticies) and he had published 17 books until now, most of them narrative or theater ones. He is also the asturian translator of some works of José Viale Moutinho and Jules Verne.

== Books published ==
- Narrative:
  - Añada pa un güeyu muertu ('Lullaby for a Dead Eye', Xosefa Xovellanos prize) (1985). Principáu d'Asturies. ISBN 84-505-3871-8
  - L’otru Sherlock Holmes ('The Other Sherlock Holmes', with Vicente García Oliva and Rafael Mijares) (1986). Azucel.
  - Pequeña lloba enllena d’amor ('Little Wolf Full of Love') (short novel prize of the Academia de la Llingua Asturiana) (1988). Academia de la Llingua Asturiana. ISBN 84-600-5318-0
  - Miénteme, dime la verdá ('Lie to Me, Tell me the Truth') (1989). Azucel. ISBN 84-86546-08-7
  - L’home que quería ser estatua ('The Man who Wanted to Be a Statue') (1991). Azucel. ISBN 84-86546-30-3
  - Diariu de viaxe ('Diary of a Journey', Xosefa Xovellanos prize) (1995). Principáu d'Asturies. ISBN 84-7847-428-5
  - El vientre del círculu ('The Circle's Belly') (1996). Editora del Norte. ISBN 84-88660-38-3
  - Venus, Occidente y otros cuentos éticos ('Venus, Occident and some Other Ethical Short Stories') (1997). Trabe. ISBN 84-8053-191-6
  - Nunca nun te fíes de la xente que nun enseña los dientes al rise ('Don't Trust Anyone Who Doesn't Show his Teeth when Smiling') (1998). Atenéu Obreru de Xixón. ISBN 84-87958-32-X
  - Nueche ('Night') (2002). Ámbitu. ISBN 84-95640-27-9
  - Suañé Cabu Verde. Nunca ye endemasiao tiempu ('I dreamed Cape Verde. Time is Never Too Much') (2003). Ámbitu. ISBN 84-95640-51-1
- Young adult literature
  - Blugás (Prímula I) (1993). Trabe. ISBN 84-8053-025-1
- Theatre:
  - Psicokiller ('Psycho-killer') (1993). Academia de la Llingua Asturiana. ISBN 84-86936-98-5
  - País. Una traxicomedia asturiana ('Country. An Asturian Tragical Comedy') (2004). Madú. ISBN 84-95998-41-6
- Monologue
  - Nelón y el sexu sentíu (y otros socedíos) ('Nelón and the Sex Sense (and some Other Facts)') (2002). Trabe. ISBN 84-8053-223-8
- Essay:
  - Pentimento I (1992). Azucel. ISBN 84-86546-33-8
  - El cine fantaterrorífico español : una aproximación al género fantaterrorífico en España a través del cine de Paul Naschy ('Fantasterrific Spanish Cinema: Approximation to Fantastic and Terror Films Using Paul Naschy's Movies', in spanish language) (1993). Santa Bárbara. ISBN 84-604-6979-4
  - El teatru popular asturianu ('Asturian Popular Theatre') (2002). Academia de la Llingua Asturiana. ISBN 84-8168-312-4
- Journalism:
  - In articulo mortis (articles) (2005). Madú. ISBN 84-95998-53-X
- Translations:
  - José Viale Moutinho: Mázcares venecianes (1989). Aína.
  - José Viale Moutinho: Cuentos fantásticos (with Xandru Fernández) (1992). Academia de la Llingua Asturiana. ISBN 84-86936-68-3
  - Jules Verne: L’eternu Adán (1992). Academia de la Llingua Asturiana. ISBN 84-86936-85-3
  - José Viale Moutinho: Nombres de árboles quemados (in Spanish language) (1993). Ateneo Obrero de Gijón. ISBN 84-87958-10-9
  - Paul Valéry: El cementeriu marín (2003). Trabe. ISBN 84-8053-164-9
  - Raúl Vallarino: Los suaños del delanteru centru (2003). Trabe. ISBN 84-8053-208-4
