= Acebal =

Acebal may refer to:

== Places ==
- Acebal, Santa Fe, a town in Santa Fe, Argentina

== People with the surname ==
- Francisco Acebal (1866–1933), Spanish writer, playwright and journalist
- Juan María Acebal (1815–1895), Spanish writer
