= Conceyu Bable =

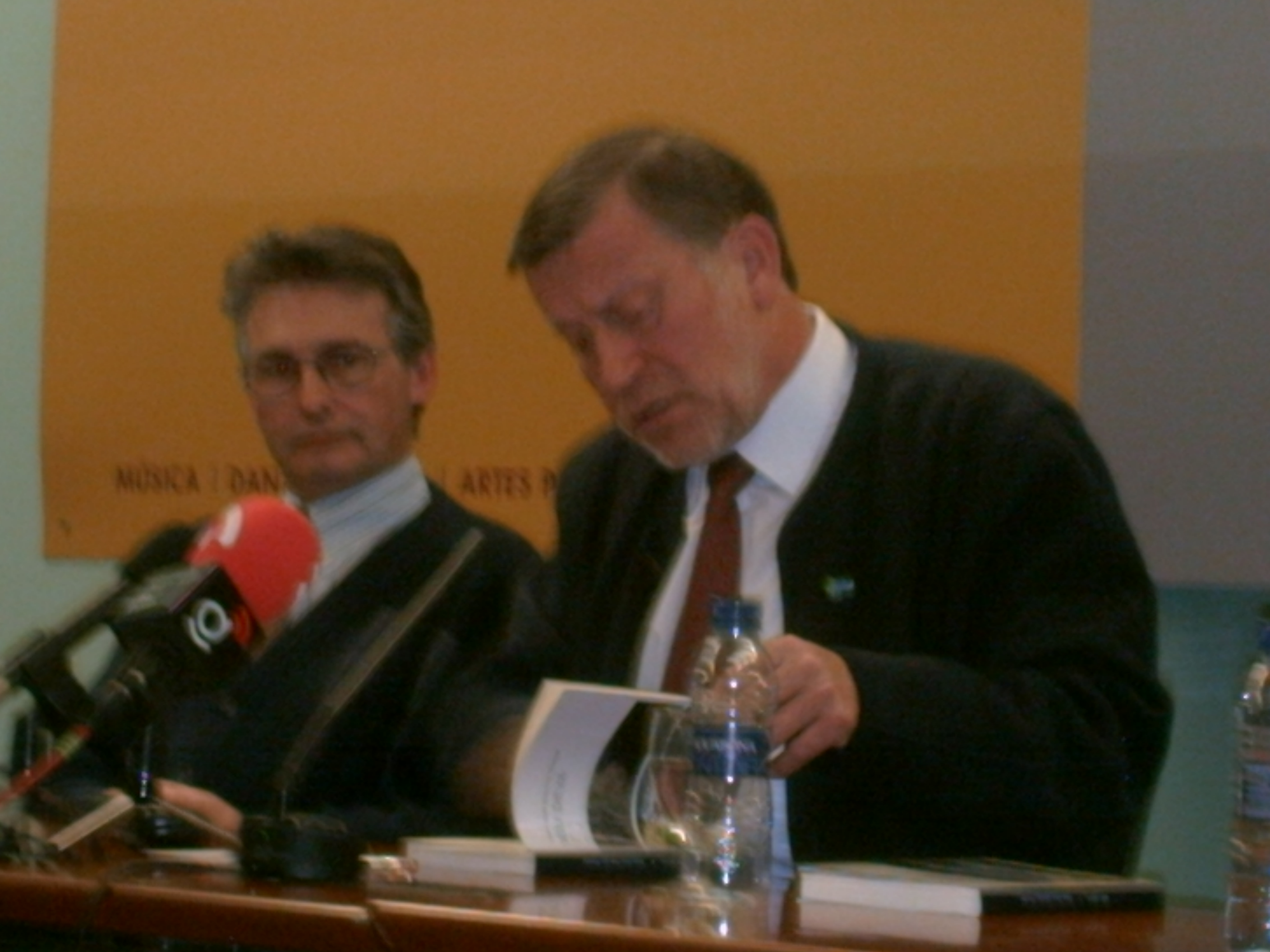
Xuan Xosé Sánchez Vicente, writer and founder of Conceyu Bable

Conceyu Bable (in Asturian language, Bable Council) was an Asturian association legalized in 1976, which objective was the recovery and dignification of the Asturian language.

== Origin ==
In the final years of Francoist Spain, arose a new generation of Asturian-language authors that took the ideas of Gaspar Melchor de Jovellanos (1744) and tried to surpass the traditional use of the Asturian language in rural and local compositions (often they were made up for the celebrations of the localities in the local dialect). This new generation tried to equip to the Asturian language with a Modern literature, next to the prevailing literary currents in Spain and Europe, while they tried to demonstrate the suitability of the language for any social or literary use.

On 1969 Xose León Delestal founded the association Amigos del Bable, that was a first attempt of recovery of the language, and that concentrated mainly in the disc edition in Asturian, organizing in November 1973 the Regional Assembly of the Bable, presided over by Emilio Alarcos Llorach. In this Assembly, were put the pillars of a new Asturian movement called Surdimientu (Awakening) and a part of the participants decided to constitute a group centered in the recovery of the language and, unlike the Amigos del Bable, they did use written and spoken of Asturian language.

== History ==
On November 16, (1974), appeared in number 284 of the magazine "Asturias semanal" the section Conceyu Bable, that would give name to the association (legalized in June 1976), in which wrote in Asturian, among others, Xosé Lluis García Arias, Xuan Xosé Sánchez Vicente and Lluis Xabel Alvarez. They were the true creators of prosa in Asturian, responsible for the sprouting of a group of writers who broke with the literary models reserved the Asturian language until then, and of the appearance of an industry cultural own, with the publication of books, discs and articles in magazines and newspapers in Asturian.

Conceyu Bable laid the foundations of the current Asturian standard cultured, based in Central Asturian variant, for being the one that it had the most speakers (+80%) and the most used by the writers, and from 1975 they organized courses of Asturian in municipalities of the center of Asturias. In 1976, members of the association published the first modern grammar of the language, “Gramática bable”.

On June 22 of 1976, a manifestation was summoned in Xixón to ask for the presence of the Asturian one in the school. The motto of the call, «bable nes escueles», was made one very well-known one then. In the manifestation participated the "Coordinación Democrática de Asturias" that included to the democratic parties and it counted on the participation of 5,000 people. After its legalization Conceyu Bable celebrated a congress, in which Xosé Lluis García Arias was chosen as president. Gradually the association moved towards nationalistic positions (Conceyu Nacionalista Astur) and from 1980, they lost all their influence with the appearance of Academy of the Asturian Language.
