= Adrián Carbayales =

Pulp writer in Asturian language

Adrián Carbayales (born 1985 in Madrid) is a novelist in Asturian language associated with the generation of "L'Espardimientu". He holds a degree in philosophy from the University of Oviedo.

Carbayales became known for his novel La Regenta contra Drácula (La Regenta Versus Dracula). This controversial novel confronts two iconic characters from Spanish and English literature in the late 19th century. It is one of the few Asturian works to reach a second edition and have a translation in Spanish. According to a 2023 academic article in Linguistic Minorities in Europe Online, "it is arguably one of the most successful Asturian novels of the 21st century."

In 2025, the second part of La Rexenta contra Drácula, titled La Rexenta contra Frankenstein, was published.

Besides novels, Carbayales developed Tiempu de lleendes, the first fully Asturian-language video game.

== Works ==
=== Novels ===
- La Rexenta contra Drácula (Ediciones Radagast, 2022, Asturian edition)
- La Regenta contra Drácula (Ediciones Radagast, 2022, Spanish edition)
- Fort Paniceiros: Una hestoria de la de mi'madre (Ediciones Radagast, 2022, collaborative work under pseudonym)
- L'horror de la viesca; Los Fugaos de Llamascura II (Orpheus Ediciones Clandestinas, 2023)
- Asturianada Mortal (Self-published, 2024)
- La Rexenta contra Frankenstein (Ediciones Radagast, 2025)

=== Short stories ===
- Los pirates del aire in the anthology L'horru de vapor (Ediciones Radagast, 2023)
- Fundió'l misteriu in the anthology L'horru máxicu (Ediciones Radagast, 2024)
- Ganes de postre, part of the serial Enedina a Medianueche in A Quemarropa (Semana Negra de Gijón, 2024)

=== Translations ===
- Conan the Bárbaru by Robert E. Howard (Ediciones Radagast, 2022)
- La llamada de Cthulhu y otres hestories by H. P. Lovecraft (Ediciones Radagast, 2023)
- Les bruxes by Roald Dahl (Ediciones Radagast, 2024)
- Domino Lady by Lars Anderson (Ediciones Radagast, 2025)

=== Video games ===
- Tiempu de lleendes (2022)
