= East Asturian =

Dialect of Asturian

- Eastern Asturian
- Native to: Asturias
- Language family: Indo-European: Italic; Latino-Faliscan; Latin; Romance; Italo-Western; Western; Iberian Romance; West Iberian; Asturleonese; Asturian; East Asturian

Language codes
- ISO 639-3: –
- Glottolog: east2272

East Asturian is a dialect of the Asturian language, known for having more Castilian influence than other varieties.

== Phonology ==
=== Vowels ===
Vowels of Eastern Asturian
	Front	Central	Back
Close	i		u
Mid	e		o
Open		a	

- Eastern Asturian shows contrast between mid and high vowels in final position. The dialect lacks vowel harmony in that position.
- In some varieties, /ɛ/ and /ɔ/ show diphthongisation to /ie/ and /ue/ respectably.

=== Consonants ===
- Initial -f in standard Asturian makes an aspirated [h], [x], or [χ] sound, which is represented by ⟨ḥ⟩.

== Sample text ==
East Asturian

Padre nuestru que tas nel cielu,
santificáu seya'l tu nome.
Amiye'l tu reinu,
ḥágase la tu voluntá lu mesmu ena tierra qu'en cielu.
El nuestru pan de tolos díes dánoslu hoi
y perdónanos les nuestres ofenses
lu mesmu que nosotros ḥacemos colos que nos faltaren.
Y nun nos dexes cayer ena tentación,
y llíbranos del mal.
Amén.

English (KJV)

Our father which art in heaven,
Hallowed be thy name.
Thy kingdom come.
Thy will be done, in earth,
as it is in heaven.
Give us this day our daily bread.
And forgive us our debts,
as we forgive our debtors.
And lead us not into temptation,
but deliver us from evil: [...]
Amen.
