= Xon de la Campa =

Spanish novelist and comic book author

Xon de la Campa Valdés
- Born: 1973 (age 52–53); Gijón, Spain
- Education: Escuela de Arte de Oviedo
- Occupations: Novelist, comic book author, illustrator, translator

Xon de la Campa Valdés (born 1973 in Gijón, Spain) is a Spanish novelist and comic book author.

== Career ==
He is the illustrator and co-author of the role-playing game Depués d’Ochobre, and has illustrated the covers of many novels, including 1809: Cartes de la Revolución de Trubia, La Rexenta contra Drácula, and Fort Paniceiros: Una hestoria de la de mi'madre. He also illustrated the Asturian translations of The Life of Lazarillo de Tormes and Dracula. He authored comic strips for the local newspaper La Información del Bajo Nalón between 2017 and 2018.

As a writer, he began with short stories in the anthologies 78 Crímenes, 78 Conceyos and L’Horru de Vapor (also illustrated by him), before debuting as a novelist with La Bastarda de Pelayu (2023). That same year, he won the Alfonso Iglesias Prize for Asturian-Language Comic with the comic Misteriu nel soterrañu (Mystery in the Underground). In 2024, he published his second novel, La Über-Xana y el fugáu (The Über-Xana and the Maqui). He is part of the generation of "L'Espardimientu", aiming to create a fantastic imaginary rooted in Asturian culture.

He translated the Asturian versions of The Smurfs.

Beyond his work as a cartoonist, illustrator, author, and translator, he is a co-founder and organizer of AsturCon, the Asturian Fantasy Convention, and a promoter of the Fontenebrosa Awards. He has also participated in other cultural events such as the Festival Celsius 232 or the Peor... ¡Imposible! film cycle.

== Works ==
=== Novels ===
- La Bastarda de Pelayu (Ediciones Radagast, 2023)
- Über-Xana y el fugáu (Ediciones Radagast, 2024)

=== Short stories ===
- Na ponte, in the anthology 78 crímenes, 78 conceyos (Ediciones Radagast, 2022)
- La nueche del home de fueu, in L'horru de vapor (Ediciones Radagast, 2023)
- Curiel Pandellagares, in the anthology L'horru máxicu (Ediciones Radagast, 2024)

=== Translations ===
- L'Estrunfísimu by Peyo (Ediciones Radagast, 2024)
- Los estrunfinos prietos by Peyo (Ediciones Radagast, 2025)

=== Comics ===
- Misteriu nel soterrañu (Ediciones Trabe, 2024)
