= Tomás José González-Carvajal =

18th/19th-century Spanish poet and statesman

The Most Excellent Tomás José González Carvajal
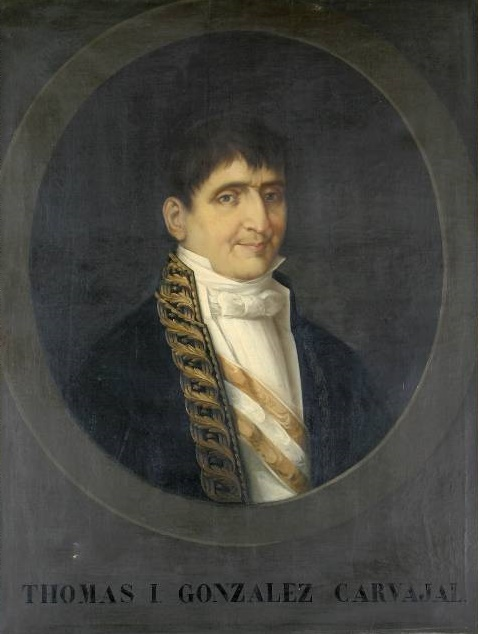
- Born: 21 December 1753; Seville, Spain
- Died: 9 November 1834 (aged 80); Madrid, Spain

Seat V of the Real Academia Española
- In office 22 March 1814 – 9 November 1834
- Preceded by: Gaspar Melchor de Jovellanos
- Succeeded by: Joaquín Ignacio Mencos

Tomás José González Carvajal (21 December 1753 – 9 November 1834), Spanish poet and statesman, was born at Seville in 1753. He studied at the University of Seville, and took the degree of LL.D. at Madrid. He obtained an office in the financial department of the government; and in 1795 was made intendant of the colonies which had just been founded in Sierra Morena and Andalusia.

During the Peninsular War of 1809–1811 he held an intendancy in the patriot army. He became, in 1812, director of the University of San Isidro; but having offended the government by establishing a chair of international law, he was imprisoned for five years (1815–1820). The Trienio Liberal reinstated him, but the counter-revolution of three years later forced him into exile. After four years he was allowed to return, and he died, in 1834, a member of the supreme council of war.

González-Carvajal enjoyed European fame as author of metrical translations of the poetical books of the Bible. To fit himself for this work he commenced the study of Hebrew at the age of fifty-four. He also wrote other works in verse and prose, avowedly taking Luis de León as his model.
