= Juan Junquera Huergo =

Juan Junquera Huergo (La Reboria, San Andrés de los Tacones, Gijón 1804 - Oviedo, 6th of May 1880) was an Asturian writer and teacher.

== Biography ==
Junquera Huergo was born in La Reboria, Gijón, and studied Law at the University of Oviedo.

In 1856 he began working as a teacher at Jovellanos High School, Gijón. He became the school's deputy director in 1870 and held this position until 1879.

== Works ==
He combined his teaching job with that of a writer and journalist, contributing variously to the regional Asturian press, notably in El Norte de Asturias (1868). He also wrote poetry in Asturian . Junquera wrote the first printed book in Asturian language, Llos Trabayos de Chinticu, printed and published in Gijón in 1843.

His published works were:

- Archivo general de Gijón o colección de documentos para la historia, estadística y topografía de la villa y concejo de Gijón, sacados de varios archivos y anotados (Gijón, 1841).
- Llos trabayos de Chinticu (Gijón, 1843, re-published in 1996). First ever printed book in Asturian.
- Gijón: Cuenta de cargo Y data, correspondiente a los Propios y Arbitrios de esta villa y su concejo, que corrieron a cargo de el alcalde primero constitucional en el año de 1843. (Oviedo, 1844).
- Memorias del Instituto de Jovellanos correspondientes A los cursos de 1870 a 1872. (Gijón, 1871 y 1872; two booklets).

He also wrote two dictionaries and a grammar for the Asturian language, but they were not published until well after his death. His grammar was to be published using money he left behind, but this never happened. The unpublished works were found in the Menéndez Foundation's library in Madrid in 1989 by Xosé Lluis García Arias:

- Diccionario del Dialecto Asturiano
- Diccionario asturiano-castellano (Up to the letter "E")
- Gramática Asturiana (1869, published by the Academy of the Asturian Language in 1991)
