= Bernaldo de Quirós =

17th-century Asturian writer

Bernaldo (or Bernard) de Quirós (1675–1710), also known as Francisco Bernardo de Quirós y Benavides, is the only Asturian writer from the 17th century besides Antón de Marirreguera and Juan de la Prada whose work has been preserved.

Little is known about Bernaldo de Quirós's personal life. He belonged to one of Asturias's most renowned families, and is likely the same "Bernaldo de Quiros" thought to have lived in Lena. He is believed to have been born around 1675, and to have participated in the War of the Spanish Succession on the side of Felipe V. It is believed that he may have died at a young age in the Battle of Zaragoza. It is thought that he was a renowned poet while he was still alive.

== Works ==
El caballu is a romance of 330 verses which takes the form of letters. The author praises the qualities of a horse that the narrator wants to sell in Oviedo/Uviéu to carry the banner of the city. The tone of the poem features elements of parody and irony. This, along with other features such as exaggerated images, make it a typical example of the Baroque style, according to Professor Ramos Corrada.
