= Les Noticies =

Les Noticies was a weekly newspaper founded in Asturias (Spain) in 1996. It was the only newspaper written entirely in Asturian. It was closed down in December 18 2012. It had nearly 20,000 readers and a weekly circulation of 5.000 newspapers. It is owned by Ambitu editions.
