= Pablo Antón Marín Estrada =

Spanish writer in Asturian (born 1966)

Pablo Antón Marín Estrada (born June 17 1966 in Sama, Langreo) is a Spanish writer in Asturian.

He studied philology and he is member of several organisations to promote the Asturian language. He founded the literary association El sombreru de Virxilio. He lives in Gijón.

== Works ==
- Blues del llaberintu (1989)
- Les hores (1990)
- Xente d'esti mundu y del otru (1992)
- Esa lluz que nadie nun mata (1995)
- Agua que pasa (1995)
- Un tiempu meyor (1996)
- La ciudá encarnada (1997)
- Nubes negres (1998)
- Otra edá (2000)
- Los baños del Tévere (2003)
- Animal estrañu (2010)
- Despidida 2011 (2011)

== Prizes ==
- Abril de narrativa para jóvenes(2000), he was the first Spaniard who won a national prize with a novel written entirely in Asturian.
