= Trastámaran Castile =

Dynasty in Spain

Coming to power in 1369, the House of Trastámara was a lineage of rulers of the Castilian and Aragonese thrones. The line of Trastámaran royalty in Castile ruled throughout a time period of military struggle with Aragon. Their family was sustained with large amounts of inbreeding, which led to a series of disputed struggles over rightful claims to the Castilian throne. This lineage ultimately ruled in Castile from the rise to power of Henry II in 1369 through the unification of the crowns under Ferdinand and Isabella.

== 14th Century: Toward Unification with Aragon ==
=== Peter I and the Rise of Trastámara ===
Upon the death of the Castilian King Alfonso XI in 1350, his eldest son, Peter, took control of the Castilian throne as Peter I of Castile. Peter was born to Alfonso and his wife, Maria of Portugal, but Alfonso lived out a long and public affair with Eleanor de Guzmán. Alfonso's illegitimate children that Eleanor had given birth to, known collectively as the Trastámaras, immediately became rivals of the newly crowned Peter. Because of a personal history including political murders, his enemies quickly tagged Peter with his nickname Peter the Cruel. Also increasing the hostilities between Peter and his half brothers was the act of Peter's mother taking the opportunity of his power to have Eleanor of Guzman arrested and executed.

Peter first resisted an attempt at his crown by defeating a coalition led by Henry of Trastámara (for whom Peter's half siblings derived their surname) in 1356. Peter again defeated his rivals at Nájera in 1360 and had his half brothers Juan and Pedro executed. Having been protected by Aragon, Henry was forced to flee to France when the Castilian crown signed a peace treaty with Aragon in 1360.

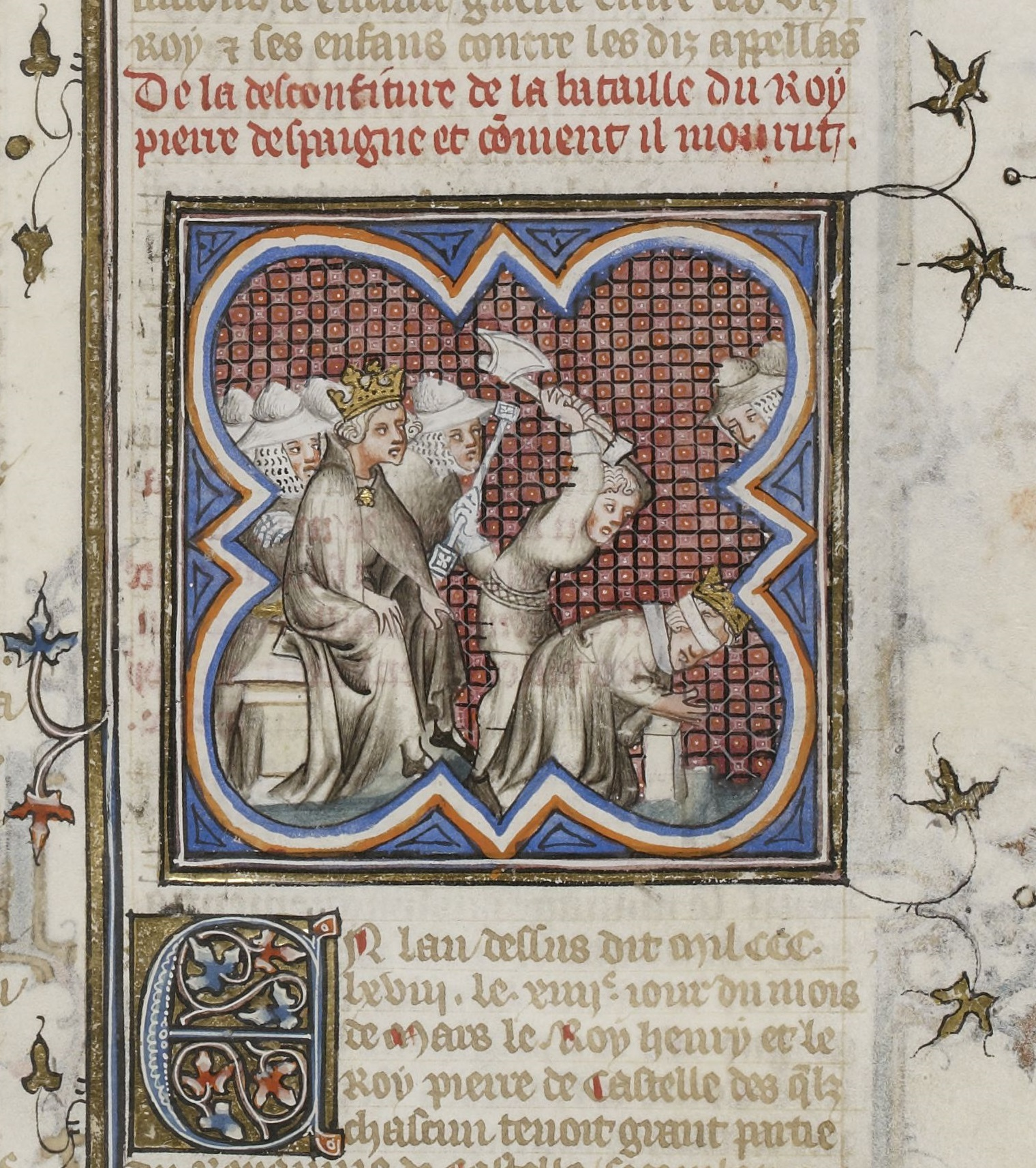
Henry supervising the beheading of his rival Peter, from the Grandes Chroniques de France.

Gaining support throughout Castile because of his relation to Alfonso XI and Peter's continuous military escapades, Henry built an alliance with Aragon and France, including mercenaries led by French constable Bertram Du Guesclin for another attempt at the Castilian crown in 1365. Peter gained the support of Edward, the Black Prince, heir to the English throne and son of Edward III of England, to help defend his crown with the promise of territorial gains. On 3 April 1367, in the Battle of Nájera, Peter and Edward's forces defeated the armies of Francs, Aragonese, and Castilians led by Henry and captured Bertram Du Guesclin. As Edward fell ill and Peter failed to fulfill his land promises to England, the English withdrew their battlefield support of the Castilian Crown. In March 1369, with the continued support of France and Aragon, and growing support in important cities in parts of Castile, Henry's forces again invaded the Castilian Crown's realm and defeated Peter's army. Henry of Trastámara, himself, was responsible for the death of his brother, Peter I of Castile.

=== Henry II’s Reign ===
Following his killing of his half brother, Peter I, Henry of Trastámara took control of the crown of Castile as Henry II. Under Henry, a new nobility rose in prominence to gain land grants of large estates and vast royal privileges. The public rise of this new class of nobles caused discontent and instability in Castile. This class of nobility was driven by their desire to reclaim family holdings and was generally compelled to use any means necessary. Despite the instability, Henry's forces were able to withstand Portuguese, Navarrese, and Granadian attempts to invade and take control of Castile.

Henry made an agreement with the ruler of Aragon, Peter IV, to have their children wed. Henry's son, John, was married to Peter IV's daughter, Eleanor, on 18 June 1375. This marriage by Henry's son would eventually put the Trastámaras in control of both Castile and Aragon, comprising a majority of the Iberian Peninsula. After giving birth to three children, Eleanor died in 1382, after only seven years of marriage.

== The Trastámaras Rule in Both Realms ==
Upon Henry II's death in 1379, his son John came to power as John I of Castile. During his reign, John took Beatriz, daughter of the Portuguese King Fernando, as his second wife. Due to this marriage, John made an unsuccessful claim to the throne of Portugal upon Fernando's death in 1383, a move that would have led to the unification of all of the Iberian Peninsula. John died very unexpectedly in 1390.

Upon his untimely death, John's eldest son Henry came to the throne as Henry III, at the very young age of twelve. He waited only two years to independently take power of the throne in 1393 at only fourteen years of age, amidst a great deal of violence being carried out against Jews throughout Castile. Among the young king's accomplishments was his taking of control of the Canary Islands, providing Castile with a holding in the Atlantic Ocean. In 1406, amidst an invasion by Granada's forces in Murcia, Henry died while planning a response at the age of 27.

John II, Henry III's son, was left as the only heir upon Henry's death in 1406, but he was only two years old. Henry's brother, Ferdinand, served as regent to the throne, along with John's mother, Catalina of Lancaster.

During his time as regent, Ferdinand was chosen as the ruler of Aragon, due to his maternal relation to the Aragonese throne, through the Compromise of Caspe in 1412. The Trastámaras now ruled in both the realms of Castile and Aragon.

== 1418- 1469: Conflict within the House of Trastámara ==
=== John II and Don Álvaro ===
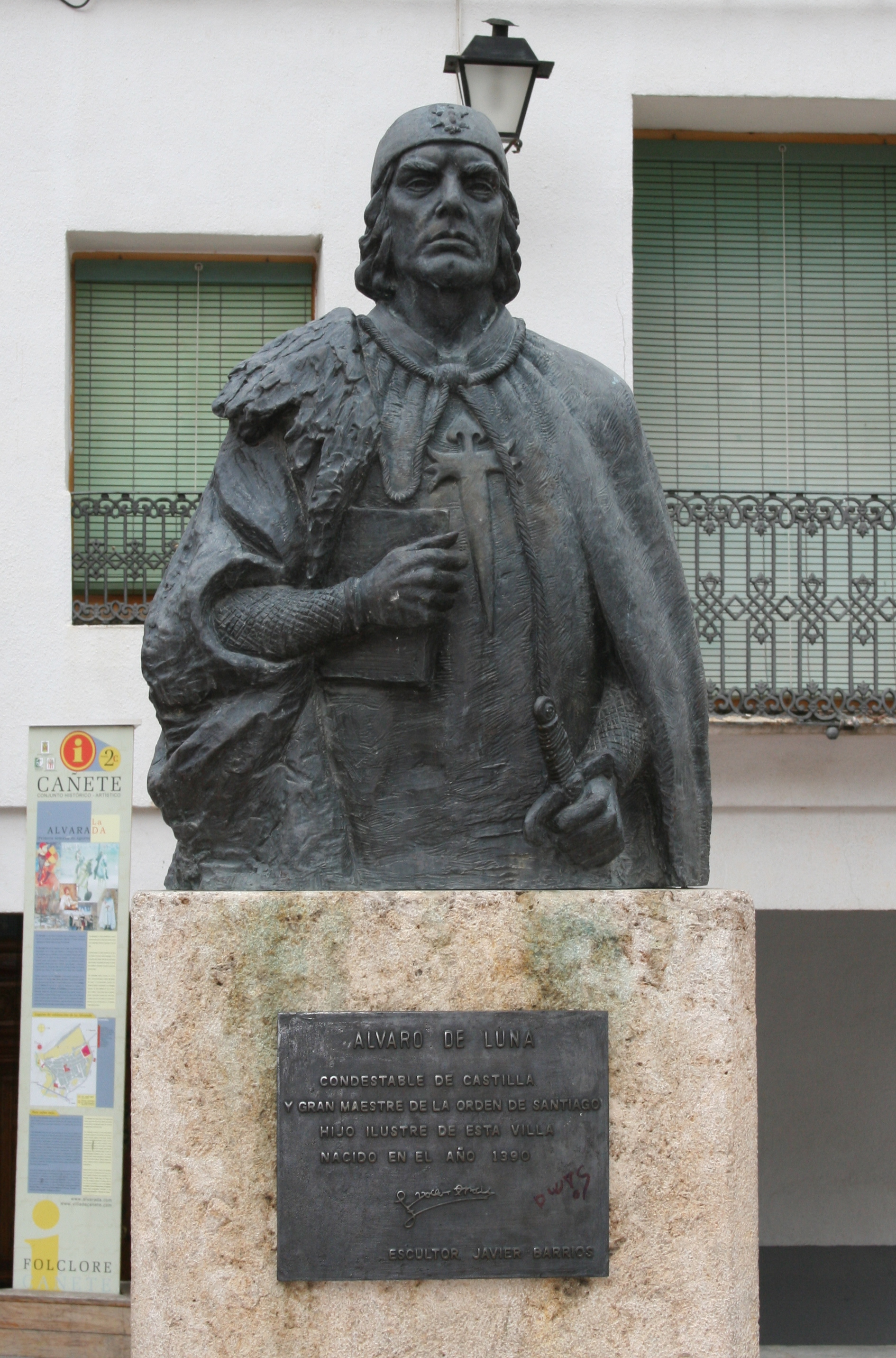
Statue of Álvaro de Luna in Cañete.

John II came to power upon his mother's death in 1418. He was now a cousin to the King of Aragon, as Alfonso ascended to the throne upon Ferdinand I's death. John married Maria, the sister of Alfonso V of Aragon. Alfonso, himself, had already married John's sister, Maria, making the two rulers both cousins and brothers-in-law twice over. John II was now also a cousin and brother-in-law to Alfonso's brothers John and Henry, known collectively as the Infantes of Aragon, who had been given large amounts of land in Castile while their father worked as regent during John II's childhood.

John II lacked widespread authority, and Castile became a battlefield for nobles to gain power and political influence. In 1420, just two years after coming to power, John was kidnapped by his cousin Infante Henry. Henry ruled on John's behalf for much of the year until John was able to escape with the help of his friend, and eventual royal favorite, Álvaro de Luna, who was known as Don Álvaro.

In 1429, Alfonso V ordered the Infantes to lead a joint attack on Castile. Now John II's constable, Don Alvaro agreed to a basically victorious truce, as the Aragonese branch of Trastamaras was removed from Castile. John II's authority continued to decline following this military engagement, and he eventually ceded all power to Don Alvaro, who created an oligarchy of nobles. Don Alvaro lost this power in 1439 to nobility which was allied with Alfonso V, and in 1443, John II was once again captured by Infante John of Aragon, throwing Castile near anarchy. This confusion was settled in 1445, when a group of nobles favoring the monarchy, led by Don Alvaro, won a battle at Olmedo. Infante Henry of Aragon was killed as a result of this battle.

In 1453, Don Álvaro was publicly beheaded for charges of tyranny. In July of the following year, John II died, and his son Henry became King Henry IV of Castile.

=== Henry IV and the Rise of Isabella ===
Henry IV of Castile was an unpopular ruler, largely in part because of his taste for Moorish fashion and his disagreement with military engagement with Granada. He was married at the age of 15 in 1440 to Infante John of Aragon's daughter, Blanca. This marriage failed, however, as a result of Henry's failure to consummate the marriage. He was remarried in 1455 to Juana of Portugal. Juana gave birth to Infanta Dona Juana in 1462, and she was recognized by the Cortes as Henry's legitimate successor. In 1464, charges were raised by powerful noble families that Infanta Juana was the daughter of one of Henry's favorites, Beltran de la Cueva.

These powerful noble families eventually forced Henry to hand over power to his brother Alfonso in 1465, but Alfonso suddenly died a month later. Amidst the struggle to settle the ensuing claims to the throne, Henry's wife Juana became pregnant again while being held as a hostage of a noble family. This sign of misbehavior further weakened her daughter's claim to the throne, and paved the way for Isabella to take power.

=== Pact of the Toros de Guisando and War of Succession ===
The Pact of the Toros de Guisando was signed in 1468 and named Isabella heir to Henry's throne, as she and the nobles renewed their allegiance to Henry in return. A quick marriage for Isabella was a condition of the agreement, however Henry objected to her 1469 marriage to Ferdinand, who was the King of Sicily and the heir to the Aragonese throne, as a breach of the pact. He once again named Infanta Juana as his heir, and a civil war ensued throughout the next decade. Isabella's military factions were eventually victorious with the help of Aragon, making her queen and uniting the crowns of Aragon and Castile.

== House of Trastámara Family Tree ==
marriage; legitimate children
liaison; illegitimate children
Alphonse XI, King of Castile
Peter, King of Castile | Henry II, King of Castile
Constance of Castile | John I, King of Castile
Catherine of Lancaster | Henry III, King of Castile | Ferdinand I, King of Aragon
John II, King of Castile | Alfonso V, King of Aragon | John II, King of Aragon
Isabella I, Queen of Castile | Ferdinand II, King of Aragon | Charles IV, King of Navarre | Blanche II, Queen of Navarre
Joanna, Queen of Castile and Aragon

KEY
House of Trastámara
Eleanor, Queen of Navarre

== See also ==
The decline of Habsburg Spain in the seventeenth century
