= Gaspar Melchor de Jovellanos =

Spanish neoclassical statesman, author, philosopher (1744–1811)

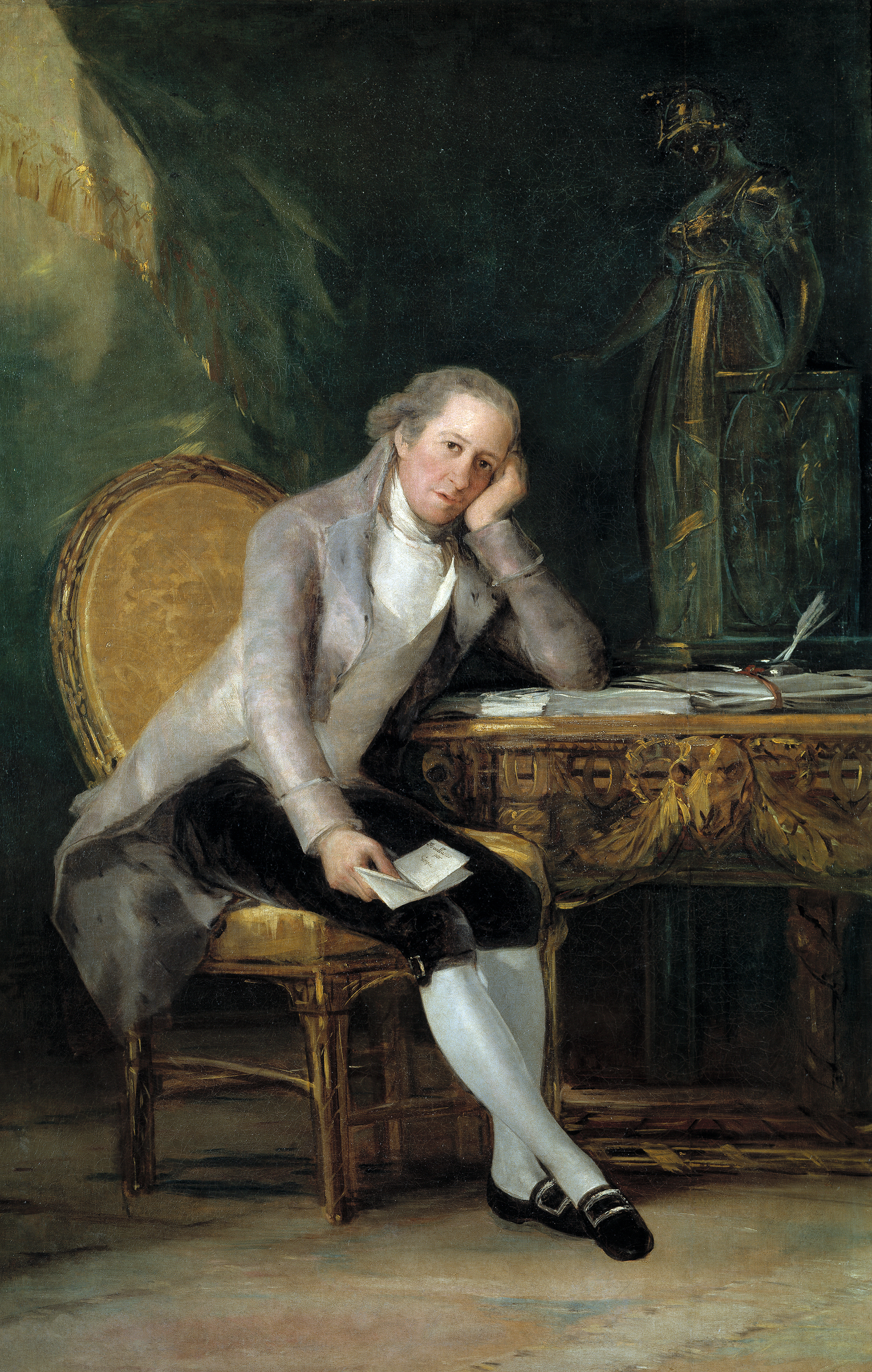
- Jovellanos painted by Goya, 1798
- Born: Baltasar Melchor Gaspar María; 5 January 1744; Gijón, Spain
- Died: 27 November 1811 (aged 67); Vega de Navia, Spain
- Occupations: Author; philosopher

Seat V of the Real Academia Española
- In office 23 September 1783 – 27 November 1811
- Preceded by: Javier Arias Dávila y Centurión
- Succeeded by: Tomás José González-Carvajal

Gaspar Melchor "Jovino" de Jovellanos (born Gaspar Melchor de Jove y Llanos, 5 January 1744 – 27 November 1811) was a Spanish neoclassical statesman, author, philosopher and a major figure of the Age of Enlightenment in Spain. He was born at Gijón in Asturias, Spain. Selecting law as his profession, he studied at Oviedo, Ávila, and the University of Alcalá, before becoming a criminal judge at Seville in 1767.

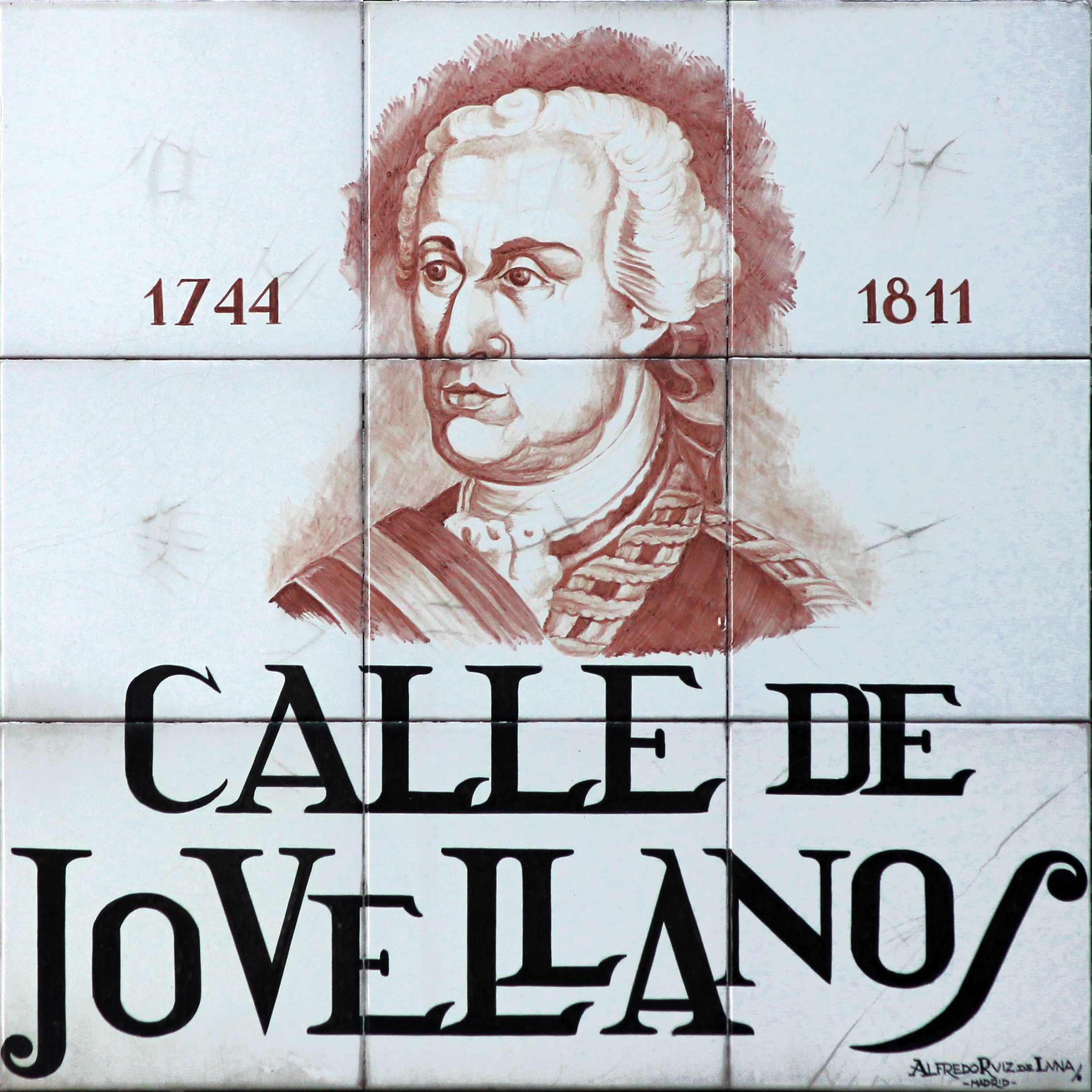
Jovellanos Street in Madrid

== Life and influence ==
After commencing his legal career, Jovellanos' integrity and ability were rewarded in 1778 by a judgeship in Madrid, and in 1780 by appointment to the council of military orders. In the capital Jovellanos was a respected member of the literary and scientific societies; he was commissioned by the Society of Friends of the Country (Madrid's economic society) in 1787 to write his most well-known and influential work, Informe en el expediente de ley agraria ("A report on the dossier of the Agrarian Law"), a project which he completed in 1794, and published in 1795.

In his work on agrarian law, he called on the crown to eliminate the concentration of land ownership in the entailment of landed estates, ownership of land by the Catholic Church, and the existence of common lands unavailable to private ownership. In his view, Spain's wealth lay in its agricultural productivity which would allow its population to grow and prosper. In the eighteenth-century regime of land tenure, productivity was stifled by the latifundia (large landed estates) of the political elites and the Catholic Church as an institution, and common lands where there was no incentive for individuals to invest in its productivity.

Jovellanos was influenced by Adam Smith's The Wealth of Nations (1776), which saw self-interest as the motivating force for economic activity. Jovellanos's recommendations were not implemented in Spain, but did influence thinking about agrarian land reform in the viceroyalty of New Spain by Bishop Manuel Abad y Queipo in the early nineteenth century before its independence in 1821. In turn, his writings influenced Alexander von Humboldt's thinking and writing on land issues in Mexico. Jovellanos also influenced thinking about agrarian land reform in Mexico in the late period of President Porfirio Díaz's regime by Andrés Molina Enríquez, who was the intellectual father of the article that empowered the State to expropriate land and other resources following the Mexican Revolution Constitution of 1917.

Involved in the disgrace of his friend, Francisco de Cabarrús, Jovellanos spent the years 1790 to 1797 in what amounted to exile at Gijón, engaged in literary work and in founding the Asturian institution for agricultural, industrial, social and educational reform throughout his native province.

He was summoned again to public life in 1797 when, turning down the post of ambassador to Russia, he accepted that of minister of grace and justice, under "the prince of peace", Godoy, whose attention had been directed to him by Cabarrús, then one of his favorites. Displeased with Godoy's policy and conduct, Melchor de Jovellanos combined with his colleague Saavedra to procure his dismissal. Godoy returned to power in 1798 and Jovellanos was again sent away to Gijón.

Together with Asturian intellectual colleagues such as González Posada, Caveda y Solares and his sister Xosefa Xovellanos, Jovellanos then focused on the study of Asturias. He intended to start several projects in the study of his native Asturian language, including an Academy of Asturian Language and an Asturian dictionary, but in 1801 he was imprisoned in Bellver Castle (Mallorca) and was forced to put all his cultural projects on hold.

The Peninsular War, and the advance of the French into Spain, set him once more at liberty. Joseph Bonaparte, having gained the Spanish throne, made Jovellanos the most brilliant offers, but the latter rejected them all and joined the patriotic opposition. He became a member of the Supreme Central Junta and contributed to reorganizing the Cortes Generales. This accomplished, the Junta at once fell under suspicion, and Jovellanos was involved in its fall. In 1811 he was enthusiastically welcomed to Gijón; but the approach of the French forced him to leave once more. The vessel in which he sailed was compelled by bad weather to put in at Vega de Navia (now known as Puerto de Vega) in Asturias, and there he died from pneumonia on November 27, 1811.

Pedro de Silva, the second President of the Principality of Asturias, is a direct descendant of Gaspar Melchor de Jovellanos through his mother, María Jesús Cienfuegos-Jovellanos Vigil-Escalera.

== Works ==
Jovellanos's prose works, especially those on political and legislative economy, constitute his real claim to literary fame. In them, depth of thought and clear-sighted sagacity are couched in a certain Ciceronian elegance and classical purity of style. Besides the Ley agraria, he wrote Elogios, and a most interesting set of diaries or travel journals (1790–1801, first published in 1915) reflecting his trips across Northern Spain. He also published several other political and social essays.

His poetical works comprises a tragedy, Pelayo, the comedy El delincuente honrado, satires and miscellaneous pieces such as a translation of a French tragedy by Jean Racine, La Ifigenia and a translation of the first book of Paradise Lost.

== See also ==
- Age of Enlightenment
- Enlightenment in Spain
