= Manuel Asur =

Spanish essayist and poet in Asturian

Manuel Asur (Manuel Asur González García) (Güeria Carrocera, San Martín del Rey Aurelio, Asturias, 1947) is a Spanish essayist and poet in Asturian. He's considered to be one of the first modern poets in this language. He has a PhD in Philosophy. His book, Cancios y poemes pa un riscar ('Songs and Poems to a Dawn') meant the beginning in 1977 of the rebirth (Asturian surdimientu) of Asturian literature, because he contributed with a poetry more modern and daring than anything written before in this language. Most of his works talk about the socio-political facts of the moment. Some became very popular in Asturias in the 1970s since the group Nuberu used them as lyrics for their songs. He wrote also a book of short stories in 1987, Hai una llinia trazada ('There's a Drawn Line'), consisting of short stories that he says to consider "almost monologues". He's a current contributor to La Nueva España publications and works in the Consejería de Medio Rural y Pesca del Principado de Asturias.

Asur has been an academician of the Academy of the Asturian Language for many years.

== Books published ==
- Cancios y poemes pa un riscar (1977). Author's edition. ISBN 84-400-3593-4
- Camín del cumal fonderu ('Going to the Deeper Peak') (1978). Author's edition. ISBN 84-500-2951-1
- Vívese d'oyíes: Poemes bilingües ('Living by Hearsay: Bilingual Poems') (1979). Seminariu de Llingua Asturiana ISBN 84-600-1484-3
- Congoxa que ye amor ('This Anguish is Love') (1982). Author's edition. ISBN 84-300-7245-4
- Destruición del poeta ('Destruction of the Poet') (1984). Academia de la Llingua Asturiana ISBN 84-600-3778-9
- Hai una llinia trazada (short stories) (1987). Academia de la Llingua Asturiana ISBN 84-600-5309-1
- Poesía 1976-1996 ('Poetry 1976-1996', selected works) (1996). Trabe ISBN 84-8053-068-5
- Orbayos ('Drizzles') (2002). Trabe ISBN 84-8053-217-3
- El libro de las visitas ('The Visitor's Book', in Spanish language) (2003). Trabe ISBN 84-8053-252-1
- Lo que dice la caracola ('What the conch says', in Spanish)(2007) Lulu.com ISBN 978-1-84753-676-1
- El solitario de Avilés—Vida y obra del filósofo Estanislao Sánchez Calvo ('The Solitary from Aviles—The Life and Work of Philosopher Estanislao Sánchez Calvo', in Spanish (2008). ISBN 978-1-4092-0593-7
- Balada del balagar (2011) Lulu.com ISBN 978-1-4709-3513-9 (Astur language) Poemes.
- Las arrogancias del barro (2015) in Spanish ISBN 9781326271565, lulu.com
