= Antón de Marirreguera =

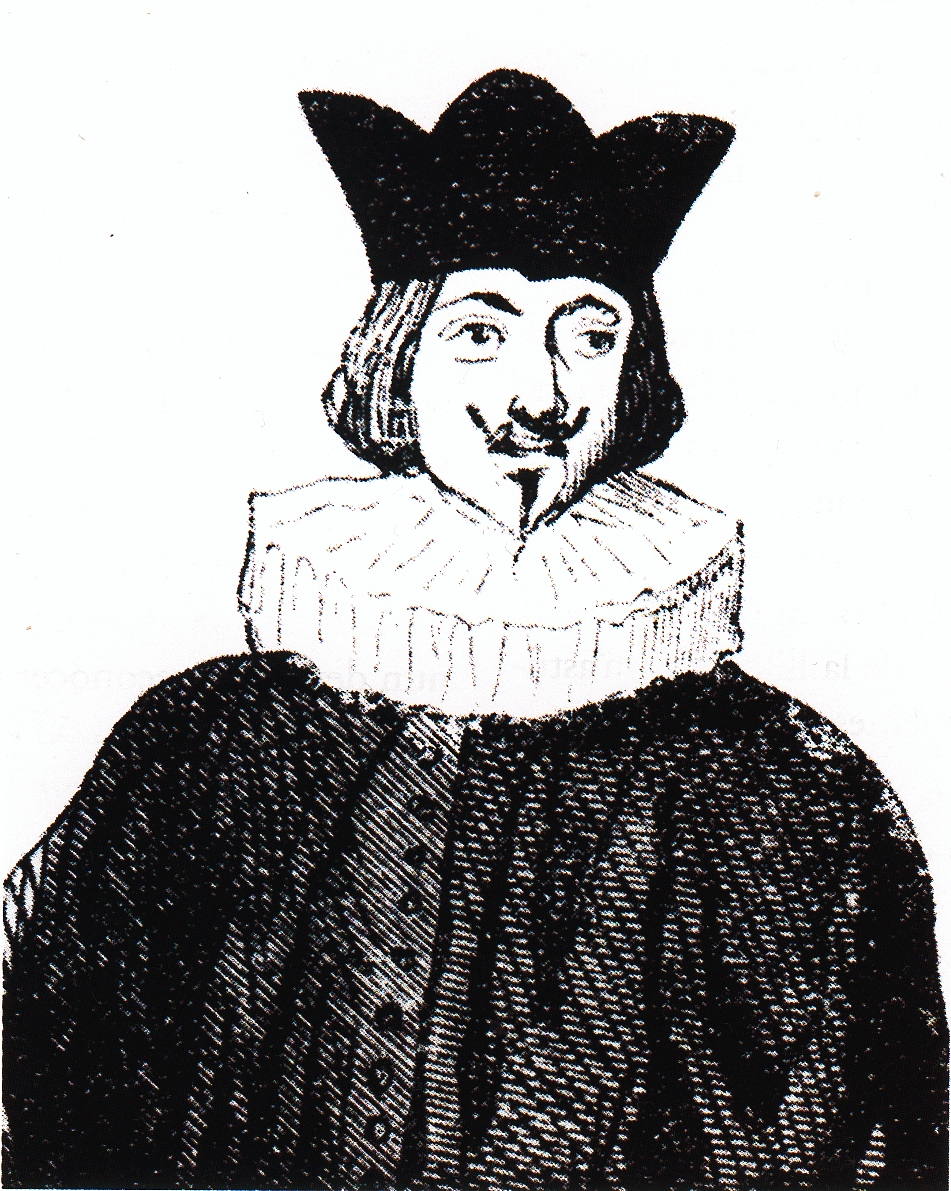
Antón de Marirreguera, 19th century ideal portrait

Antón González Reguera, better known as Antón de Marirreguera was the author of the first preserved literary works written in the Asturian language, the «Pleitu ente Uviéu y Mérida pola posesión de les cenices de Santa Olaya» (Dispute between Oviedo and Mérida over Saint Eulalia's Ashes), of 1639, that takes the first prize in a poetical contest dedicated to Saint Eulalie. Other works include the «Diálogu políticu» (Politician Dialogue), the fables «Dido y Eneas» (Dido and Aeneas) and «Hero y Lleandro» (Hero and Leander) and the entremeses «L'ensalmador» (The Healer, «L'alcalde» (The Mayor) and «Los alcaldes» (The Mayors).

== Life ==
Antón González Reguera was born in the first years of the 17th century (in 1605 according to Carlos González de Posada) in Llorgozana (Carreño), in a fidalgo family. He was called Antón de Marirreguera because of his mother, María González Reguera. It is supposed that his father was named Pedro Álvarez Hevia and that he died early. Being without a father and starting religious studies, he took the family name from his mother, following the tradition (which would explain why in some documents he appears as Antonio Álvarez).

He studied Latin, Humanities and Theology in the University of Oviedo, became a priest in 1631 and took charge of some parishes in Carreño.

In the fidalgo census of this municipality he is called Antonio González Reguera, priest of Priendes between 1640 and 1644. In 1645 he appears as the priest of Albandi, but with the name of Antonio González Moñiz, taking the second family name from his uncle Xoan Moñiz who was the preceding priest in this parish.

In Albandi documents he continues to appear as the parish priest until 1661, when he is relieved by his nephew Xuan Rodríguez Reguera. He does not appear in the fidalgo census of 1662, so it is supposed that he died between 1661 and 1662.

== Works ==
Antón de Marirreguera had been known as a writer since his days at university and his works became very popular when he was alive. However, most of them are lost today. According to González Posada, Antón de Marirreguera himself asked his nephew to burn some of his papers just before his death, because he did not want it to be said that a priest "amused himself doing this sort of thing".

Some titles of his lost works are known, for example «Los impuestos» (The taxes), «Padrenuesu» (Holy Lord), «Razonamientu ente Xuan Moñiz y Pero Suare» (Argument between Xuan Moñiz and Pero Suare) and «Décimes» (Décimas). «Píramo y Tisbe» could also be added, but the assignation of the version collected by Xosé Caveda y Nava is in doubt.

The first edition of his works was made by González Posada, who published the «Pleitu ente Uviéu y Mérida» and the first octave of «Dido y Eneas» in Memorias Históricas del Principado de Asturias y Obispado de Oviedo (Historical Memories of the Asturian Principality and the Oviedo Diocese) of 1794.

Later, Xosé Caveda y Nava included these two poems in his Colección de poesías en dialecto asturiano (Collection of Poems in Asturian Dialect) in 1839, adding «Hero y Lleandro», «Píramo y Tisbe», «Diálogu políticu» and «L'ensalmador».

The most complete edition is Xulio Viejo's 1997 one, titled «Fábules, Teatru y Romances» (Fables, Theater and Romances). In his introduction, he disputes the assignation to Marirreguera of the fable called "Píramo y Tisbe", collected by Caveda. Xulio Viejo thinks it is possible that this work had been written by Benito de l'Auxa, although it is known that Marirreguera had written another one with the same title.

In May 2000, the Selmana de les Lletres asturianes (Week of Asturian Letters) was dedicated to Antón de Marirreguera and his work. With this motive, an adaptation of «L'ensalmador» was performed, arranged by Lluis Antón González and directed by Xulio Vixil.
