= Xosefa Xovellanos =

Spanish nun (1745–1807)

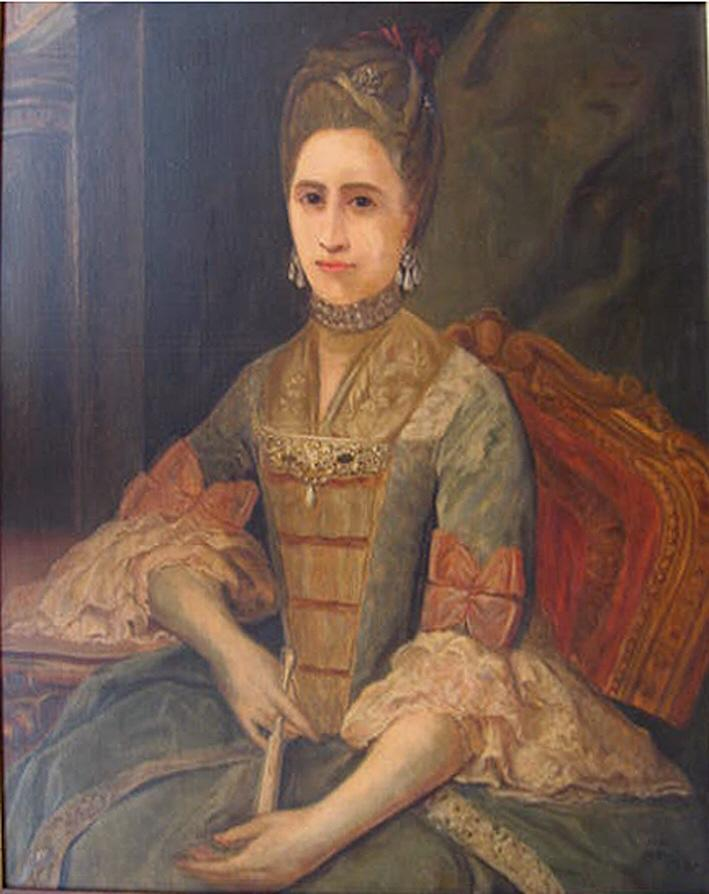
Portrait of Josefa de Jovellanos (1745-1807

Xosefa de Xovellanos y Xove Ramírez (1745–1807) was the younger sister of Asturian politician Gaspar Melchor de Xovellanos and prominent writer in Asturian. She was born in Gijón on June 4, (1745) and married to Domingo Gonzalez de Argandona, Attorney General at the Court of the Principality of Asturias.

Xosefa Xovellanos became a nun, against the strong will of her brother, in the Recoletes Convent of San Agustin, at the foot of the house where she was born. She died on June 2, 1807, from an illness. Her work is known thanks to an anthology compiled in 1839 by Xosé Caveda y Nava (Colección de poesías en dialecto asturiano; Oviedo, 1839).
