= Xuan Bello =

Spanish poet (1965–2025)

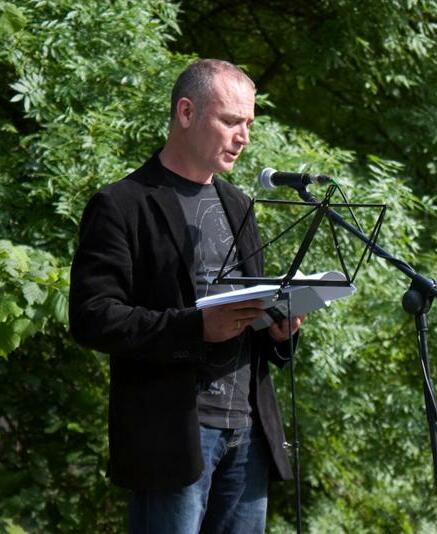
- Bello in 2012
- Born: 10 July 1965; Paniceros, Tineo, Asturias, Spain
- Died: 29 July 2025 (aged 60); Oviedo, Spain
- Citizenship: Spanish
- Occupations: Poet, contemporary writer

Xuan Bello Fernán (Asturian pronunciation: [ˈʃuaŋ ˈbeʎo feɾˈnaŋ]) (10 July 1965 – 29 July 2025) was a Spanish poet and one of the best-known contemporary Asturian writers.

== Life and work ==
=== Poetry ===
In 1982, at 16 years old, Bello published his first book of poems in Asturian, Nel cuartu mariellu. His poetic works, apart from those published in university magazines and in Lletres asturianes, continued with El llibru de les cenices (1988), Los nomes de la tierra (1991), El llibru vieyu, with which he won the Teodoro Cuesta prize for poetry in 1993, and Los Caminos Secretos (1996). In 1999 he published a bilingual anthology (Asturian-Spanish) of his poetry, with the title La Vida Perdida.

=== Newspapers and magazines ===
Bello also did numerous translations, especially of Portuguese authors, and has collaborated on magazines such as Clarín, Adréi and Zimbru, having co-founded the last two with Berta Piñán and Esther Prieto, respectively. He also has been published in the newspapers La Nueva España and El Comercio and the weekly Les Noticies, of which he has been the director since 1997. In 2005 he founded Xunta d'Escritores Asturianos ("Congress of Asturian Writers").

=== Critical acclaim ===
Bello's literary fame outside of the Asturian community came with his Spanish language translation of his own Hestoria Universal de Paniceiros, for which he received the Ramón Gómez de la Serna prize and which was one of the most critically acclaimed Spanish books of 2003.

=== Death ===
Bello died from aortic aneurysm on 29 July 2025, at the age of 60.

== List of published works ==
=== Poetry ===
- Nel cuartu mariellu (1982)
- Llibru de les cenices (1988)
- El llibru vieyu (1994)
- Los caminos secretos (1996)
- La vida perdida (1999)

=== Essays ===
- Como facer L'Habana ensin salir d'Asturies (1998)
- Ríu arriba (1998)
- La bola infinita (2000)

=== Narratives ===
- Pantasmes mundos, laberintos (1996)
- La memoria del mundu (1998)
- Historia universal de Paniceiros (2002)
  - Paniceiros, Areté, 2004, ISBN 978-84-397-1042-4
- Los cuarteles de la memoria (2003)
- Meditaciones nel desiertu (2003)

=== Children's literature ===
- El nuberu ye bona xente (2003)

=== Translations ===
- José Luis Olaizola: Bibiana y el so mundu (1989)
- Fernando Pessoa: Estancu y otros poemes (1989)
- Robert Louis Stevenson: El casu raru del dr. Jeckyll y mr. Hyde (1995)
- Arthur Conan Doyle: Tres aventures de Sherlock Holmes (1995)
- Álvaro Cunqueiro: Escuela de melecineros y fábula de varia xente (1997)
- Jaume Cela: Silenciu nel corazón.
- Various authors: Sieglu XX cambalache
- Alfonso Daniel Rodríguez Castelao: Coses (2000)
- Jordi Sierra i Fabra: Nun llugar que llamen guerra (2002)

=== Others ===
- Alfaya (dictated material from Berta Piñán (1989))
- L'alborá de los malvises (Critical edition of the work of Constantino Cabal (1999))
- El sentimientu de la tierra (Anthology of contemporary Asturian literature (1999))
