= Xandru Fernández =

Spanish writer (born 1970)

Xandru Fernández (born 1970 in Turón, Asturias, Spain) is an Asturian language writer. He is one of the most prolific authors of the second generation of the Surdimientu. His work currently includes seven novels, four books of poetry and two novelas, in addition to translations of works by Franz Kafka, Thomas Mann and Friedrich Nietzsche.

Fernández is also known as a musical lyricist, associated with the Asturian rock group Dixebra.

== Life ==
He earned a Bachelor of Philosophy from the University of Oviedo. at present he teaches philosophy at the public institute of Luanco.

He has won, among other awards, the Xosefa de Xovellanos prize for narratives in 1994 and 1999. He has promoted various cultural initiatives and he was a member of the editorial staff of the essay magazine Tiempu de Nós.

== Works ==
=== Novels ===
- El silenciu en fuga (1990)
- Tráficu de cuerpos (1990)
- El club de los inocentes (1994)
- El suañu de los páxaros de sable (1999)
- Los homes de bronce (2001)
- Les ruines (2005)
- El nuesu mar de los sargazos (2005)
- La banda sonora del paraísu (2006)
- El príncipe derviche (2012)

=== Books of poetry ===
- Primer bestiariu (1990)
- Breviariu de la diáspora (1993)
- Lletra muerto (1998)
- Servidume (2000)
- El doble blancu (2008)
- Les vides incompletes (2009)

=== Short stories ===
- Del llaberintu al trenta (1995)
- Les cuentes del alma (2000)
- Entierros de xente famoso (2008)
