= Juan María Acebal =

Juan María Acebal or Xuan María Acebal (8 March 1815 – 11 February 1895), was an Asturian writer who wrote both in Spanish and Asturian.

He was born in Oviedo, studied Humanities and philosophy with the Jesuits, and after their expulsion from Spain in 1835, he had to abandon his studies and return to Oviedo. There, along with his brother, was involved in various businesses, noting especially his artistic side as a sculptor. Acebal, who had traditionalist ideas, deeply religious and Carlist Party member, was exiled to Bayonne (France), in 1873 after the last Carlist War.

His poetry was always published in the regional press and was not collected in book until 1925 when Enrique Garcia Rendueles collected it for the work "Los nuevos bablistas".

It is often referred to him as the "prince of bable poets" due to its linguistic rigor and literary quality of his works.

== Works ==
- Cantar y más cantar
- La fonte de Fascura
- A María Inmaculada
- Refugium peccatorum
- ¡Pobre madre!
- El amor del hogar
- Trébole
- Charada
- ¡Qué despacio el tiempo pasa!
- A Enrique Tamberlick
