= Martín López-Vega =

Spanish and Asturian poet (born 1975)

Martín López-Vega (born 1975 in Poo, Llanes, Asturias) is a Spanish and Asturian poet.

== Published works ==
=== Asturian ===
- Esiliu (poetry, 1998)
- Les coraes de la roca (poetry, together with Chechu García, 1999)
- La visita (poetry, 2000)
- El sentimientu d'un occidental (prose, 2000)
- Piedra filosofal (poetry, 2002)
- Parte metereolóxicu pa Arcadia y redolada (prose, 2005)

=== Spanish ===
- Objectos robados (poetry, 1994)
- Travesías (poetry, 1996)
- Cartas portuguesas (travelogue, 1997)
- Los desvanes del mundo (prose, 1999)
- La emboscada (poetry, 1999)
- Mácula (poetry, 2002)
- Árbol desconocido (poetry, 2002)
- Elegías romanas (poetry, 2004)
