= Lluis Antón González =

Spanish actor, writer and director

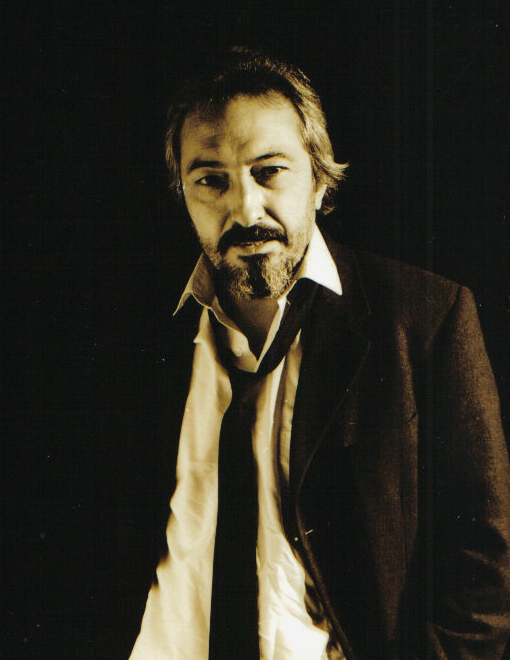
Lluis González

Lluis Antón González (June 13, 1955 in Baíña, Mieres) is an Asturian actor, writer, and director.

A member of the theatrical group Telón de Fondo, he participated as an actor, director, and adaptor in many montages by the collective. As a film actor, he worked in many films made in the Asturias.

A militant Asturian independentist, he has been a participant in the movement for the recovery of the linguistic and social identity of the Asturias. He created and directed the cartoon magazine "El Llapiceru" edited by the Conceyu Bable-Xixón. In the year 2002, he published his first book Antón, el cantu´l cisne inspired by the works of Anton Chekhov.
