= Sanctuary of the Virgen de Bendueños =

Sanctuary in Asturias, Spain

Coordinates: 43°05′26″N 5°49′07″W

- Santuario de la Virgen de Bendueños
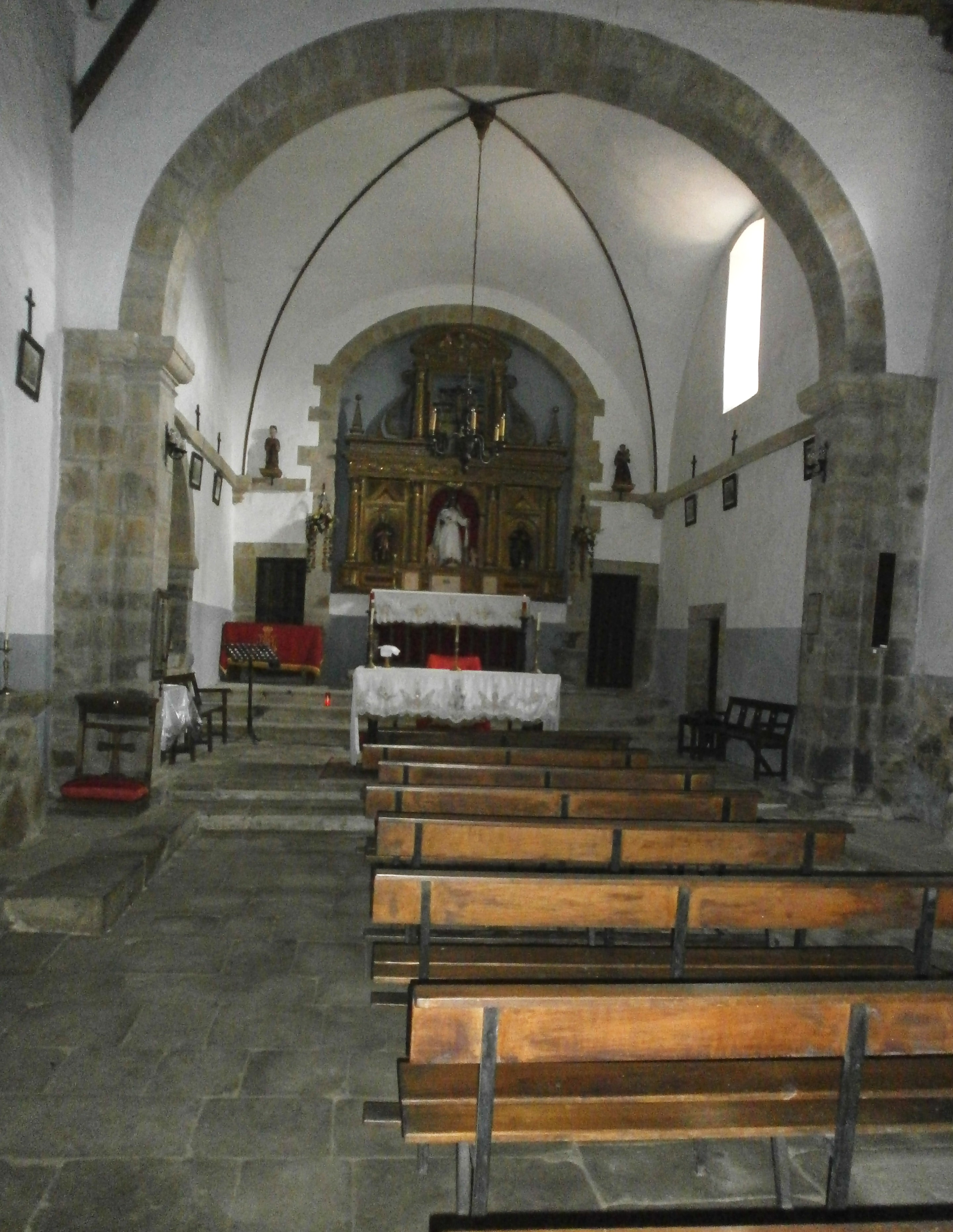

Religion
- Affiliation: Catholic Church
- Deity: Our Lady of Bendueños

Location
- Location: Asturias, Spain

Architecture
- Style: Gothic
- Founder: King Alfonso III of Asturias and Queen Jimena of Asturias
- Date established: 16th century

The Sanctuary of the Virgen de Bendueños, also called Our Lady of Bendueños, is a place of worship of the Catholic Church located in the town of Bendueños (municipality of Lena), in the central area of Asturias in Spain. It is located on the south, towards the port of Pajares on the N-630, about 5 km from Pola de Lena, so it was one of the most sought after stops for pilgrims making the Camino de Santiago from León through Oviedo.

It is a Gothic style sanctuary, founded in 905, when King Alfonso III and Queen Jimena donated a series of monasteries to the Archdiocese of Oviedo, among them Bendueños, on January 20th. A structure was built on the foundations of the primitive pre-Romanesque temple that is partly from the late Middle Ages. In the 16th century, the current sanctuary was built on the previous remains. Different compartments were added such as the sacristy, side altars, bell tower, etc. Separated from the sanctuary by a few meters to the north, in front of the main portico, is the “Casa de novenas”, which was inhabited by a hermit who took care of the sanctuary and helped pilgrims. It was significantly enlarged in 1741.

The sanctuary had one of the first “priestly confraternities”. In it, the parish priests of nearby places - and some from far away - met to improve their human, intellectual and moral life, as well as to receive the Sacrament of Penance, for which a loft was built in the east area that served as a meeting room and was called the “House of the Confraternity”. The sanctuary was closely linked to the Benedictine monasticism, since there were five of them in the surroundings of the sanctuary, frequented by monks and abbots.

== Hermitage or sanctuary ==
In the local and national environment, there is a tendency to magnify the so-called “minor hermitages” to convert them, in good faith, into sanctuaries, when in fact they are not. To differentiate a hermitage from a sanctuary, which is not easy, it is necessary to take into account what the Catholic Church says about the matter. Specifically, Canon law of the Catholic Church 1230 states:

(...) by the name of sanctuary is designated a church or other sacred place to which, for a particular reason of piety, numerous faithful go on pilgrimage, with the approval of the Ordinary of the place.

Although it does not establish a rigid difference, this gives a guideline to follow to denominate these pilgrimage centers in one way or another. Both conditions are fulfilled in this temple, which is why it is considered a sanctuary.

== History ==
Oral tradition says that a temple was located in this place, dedicated to the Gallic god Vindus, which was Latinized as Apollo Vindonnus. In reality, the first documented data of the sanctuary dates back to the year 905, as it is cited in the “Liber Testamentorum” found in the Archives of the Cathedral of Oviedo, dated January 20th of that year, in which King Alfonso III and Queen Jimena donated a series of monasteries, villas and churches to the Church of Oviedo, among them the Monastery of San Clodio and the village of Herías. The “Liber Testamentorum” literally reads: Inter fluminae Ornam et Lenam eclesiae Sanctae Mariae de Uendonios (in English: Church of Santa María de Vendonios between the rivers Huerna and Lena). This document also mentions the church of Santa María de Castiello, the church of Santa María de Campomanes and the church of the village of Herías, among others. Since then, the accents of Marian fervor began to resound in the history of this region of Lena when the ecclesial words Sanctae Mariae de Vendonios were pronounced.

It is not known with certainty if the existing sanctuary preserves any element of the original pre-Romanesque church. Some historians claim that the Romanesque doorway and the capitals of the church of Saint Antoninus of Pamiers come from that initial church of Bendueños. Others claim that these architectural elements come from a building located in the village of Alcedo de los Caballeros, near Bendueños and totally deserted in recent times, where the Order of the Knights Templar - founded in 1118 and whose mission was to guard and help pilgrims - had a building. According to this hypothesis, the church of Bendueños could have been a place of rest and prayer for pilgrims on their way to the Cathedral of San Salvador de Oviedo and on their way to the Camino de Santiago.

The present sanctuary was built in the 16th century, on the foundations of the initial temple. That consists of a single nave, not very large, with a choir at the foot, a dressing room, sacristy, porticoes to the north and west and a bell tower. To the left of the nave is attached the so-called “Casa de la Cofradía” and, to the right, next to the presbytery, is the sacristy. The chapel dedicated to St. Joseph has disappeared, but the polychrome carving of the saint with the Infant Jesus is preserved.

== Location ==
The sanctuary began to be built in what was the immense municipality of Lena, since its slopes of “Lena de Suso” were located between the Pajares and Huerna rivers, and “Lena de Yuso” reached from Mieres to Agüeria and Olloniego, being called the “Conceyón”. Nowadays, it is smaller. In 2010, the municipality of Lena had about 12,400 inhabitants, 26 parishes, 5 of them consecrated to the Virgin Mary, and a cast iron monument of the Immaculate Conception, dating from 1904, paid for and built by the residents of Carabanzo and located in the “Cuitu Ramón”, a peak where the municipalities of Aller, Mieres and Lena converge. In the municipality, there are also ten Marian chapels, which gives an idea of the great devotion of the “lenenses” to the Virgin Mary in any of its many invocations. The jewel of the Asturian pre-Romanesque, Santa Cristina de Lena, which is universally known for the beauty and slenderness of its architectural forms, is very close to the Sanctuary of the Virgen de Bendueños, which adds another attraction to the area surrounding the sanctuary.

Above the village of Bendueños and its sanctuary is the Peñasca Xulives, formerly highly respected because it was believed to have a special attraction of supernatural origin concerning lightning storms. Science has been in charge of dismantling this idea, since the high frequency of lightning strikes in that area, which is true, is due to other factors of orographic and geological type. The neighbors of those times, in the moments of great storms, went to the sanctuary and, ringing the bells, prayed at the feet of the image of Santa Barbara with the following invocation: “Stop, cloud. Stop, yourself. God is stronger than you”.

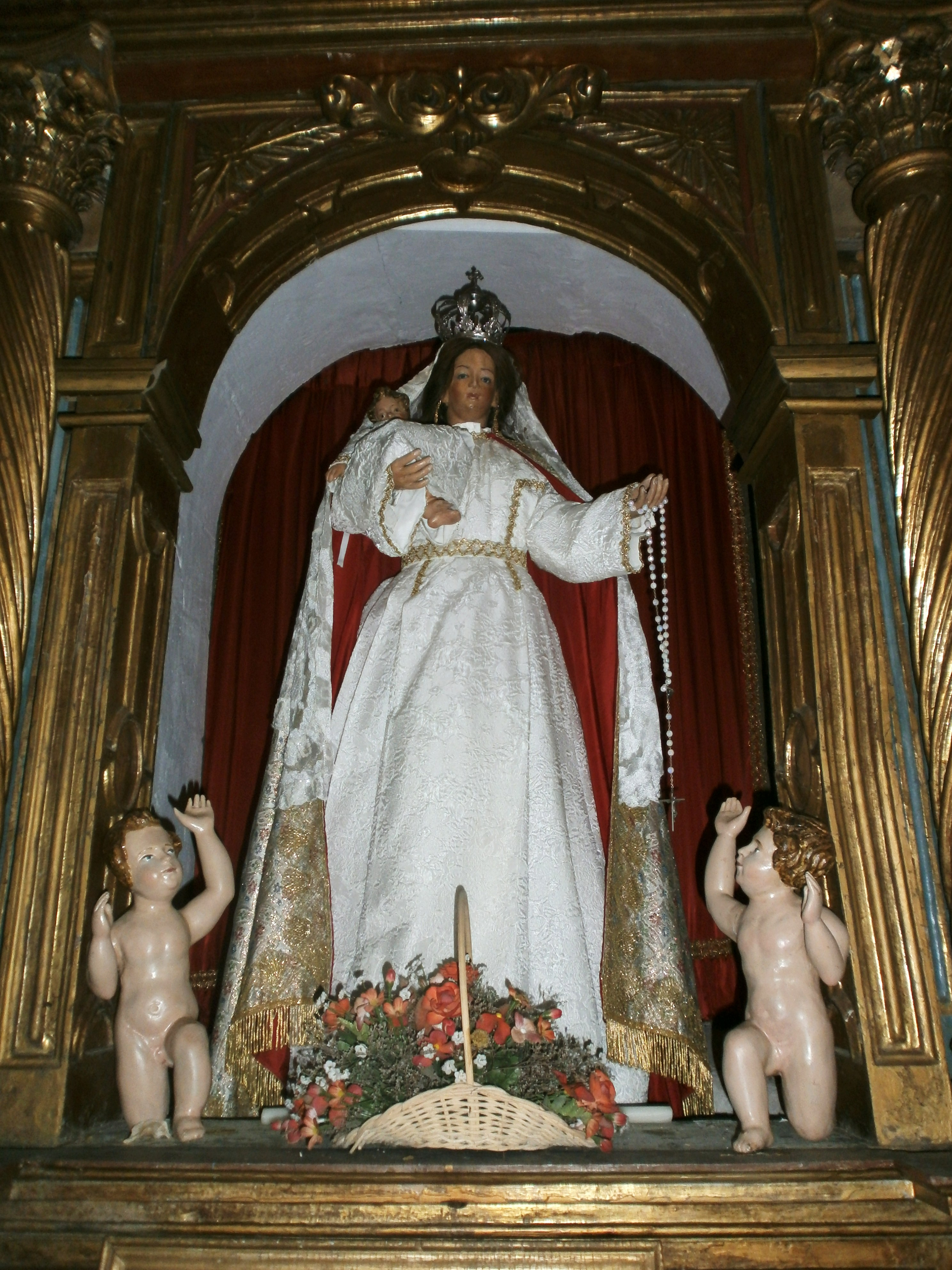
The sanctuary's camarín

== Camarín ==
In the Book of the Sanctuary, there is information that the works on the camarín were already being carried out in 1702. As the front is transparent, on solemn days, the Virgin can be venerated from the whole church, while the rest of the days it could be done with more intimacy in the altar that is under her feet, inside the chapel of the camarín. The master stonemason was Pablo de Cubas, who in 1704 was paid 482 reals for the work on the camarín and certain improvements to the main altar. This amount was obtained through the “alms of the brotherhood” and the “soldadesca”, a kind of pantomime that took place on Easter Tuesday of Pentecost each year, and whose purpose was to raise funds for the works and maintenance of the sanctuary. Regarding the cost and payment of the “doraduras”, the best way is to quote the minutes that Juan de Lozana Valdés, archpriest of the party, and Alonso Rodríguez Alfonso, priest of Herías, signed in the field of Bendueños on May 27, 1710:

" ... by call of Toribio Fernández, master of gilding and painting, so that those gentlemen would order the painting and gilding of the altarpiece and the chapel of Nuestra Señora de Bendueños, by which said Toribio Fernández and I, the steward, agreed in writing that said master would execute the work, and they agreed on 1100 reals with the construction of a frontal, which said chapel painted in oil with the best paintings was to be put by said master”.

In 1713, the stained glass windows were gilded, which are preserved to this day.

== Priestly Confraternity of the Sanctuary ==
The Priestly Confraternity of the Sanctuary of the Virgen de Bendueños was an association or confraternity founded by the priests of the Asturian region of Lena - and some whose parishes were not located in the region - in 1620, during the papacy of Pope Paul IV, to help each other in the material, spiritual and social aspects. At that time, rural priests were often isolated, and they needed to be united and to meet in some way with certain frequency to receive the sacrament of forgiveness or confession, to pray in common, to receive meditations, etc.

=== Main purpose ===
Among the various purposes of the confraternity, the following stand out: to promote devotion to the Virgen de Bendueños, among its parishioners as well as among themselves; to provide mutual help given the loneliness in which they lived, since the trips to other places was long and difficult; to offer suffrages for the members who died; and, on a material level, to procure the maintenance and improvement of the Bendueños sanctuary. The confraternity grouped all the priests of the archpriestships of Lena de Suso and Lena de Yuso, which covered an area larger than the demarcation of the council of Lena itself.

=== Members ===
At the beginning, the confraternity did not admit lay members, with the only exception of the “Señor de la Casa de Campomanes”, the Viscount of Peña de Francia, to whom they imposed the condition to pay the annual meal that the confraternity had for St. Mark and to pay for three masses for each member who died. The fifteen members of the brotherhood are expressly mentioned on page eight of the Book of the Confraternity and are the parish priests of the following places: Alcedo de San Lorenzo, Cabezón, Campomanes, Casorvida, Castiello, Xomezana, Sotiello, Puente de los Fierros, Herías, Telledo, Tuíza, Llanos de Somerón, Pajares, Piñera and Zurea. From 1624 onwards, the parish priests of Uxo, San Juan Bautista de Mieres, Ḷḷindes (Quirós), the abbot of Paraná, the chaplain of Santa María de la Nieves, the priest of Ayones in the council of Valdés, the priest of Riello, the priest of Cabarcosin Mondoñedo, canons of the Cathedral of Oviedo and of the Collegiate Church of Santa María de Arbas and the archdeacons of Babia and Gordón, both in the province of León, which at that time belonged to the bishopric of Oviedo.
