= Sylvia Casares =

Mexican-American chef

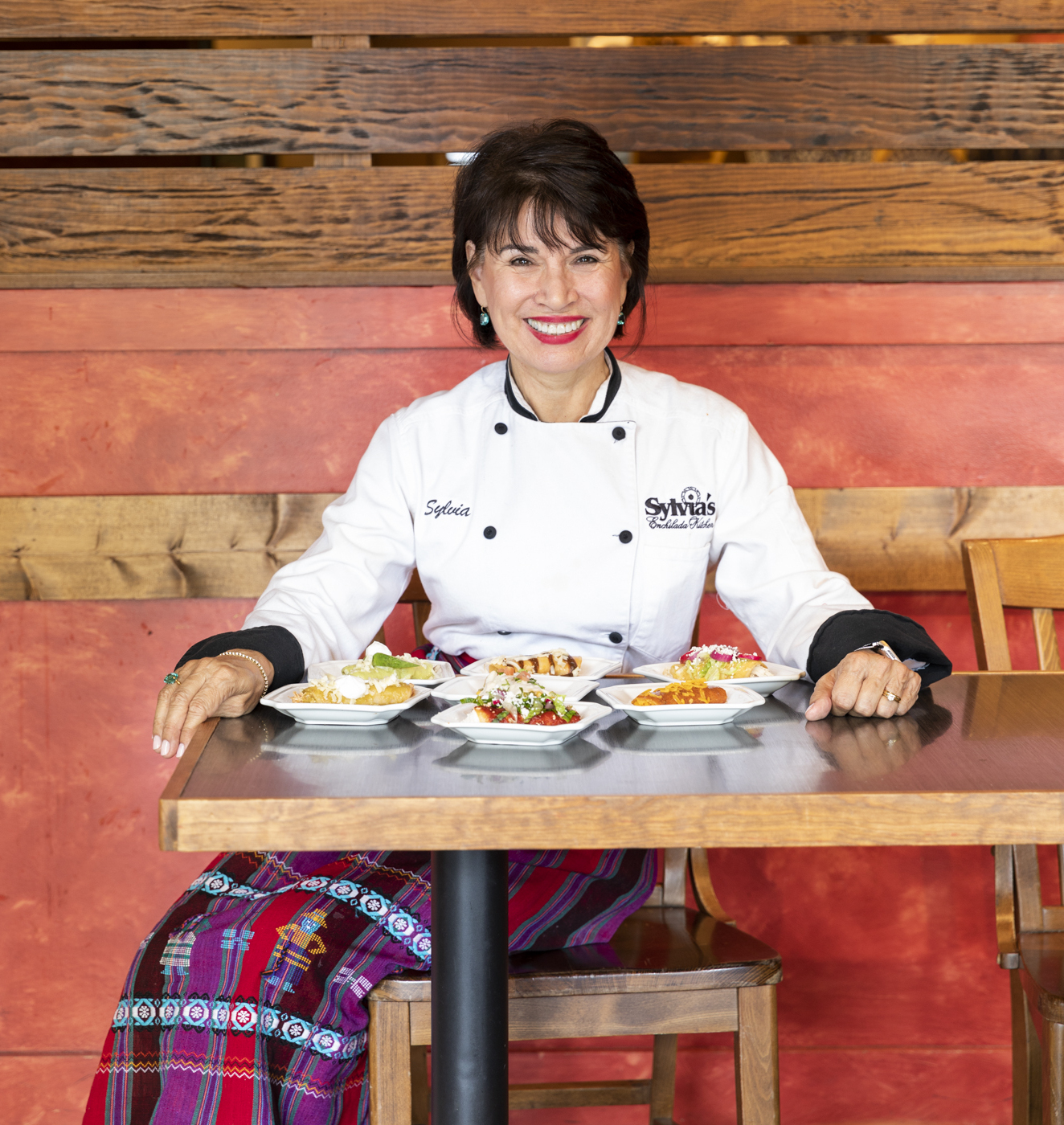
Chef Sylvia Casares

Sylvia Casares (born 1953) is a Mexican-American chef, restaurateur, and cookbook author based in Houston, Texas. She is recognized for her focus on the regional cuisines of South Texas, particularly Tex-Mex, and has documented these traditions through her restaurants and published works.

Her brother, Oscar Casares, is a writer and professor at the University of Texas at Austin, where he directs the Creative Writing Program. He has published several works influenced by their family and upbringing in Brownsville, Texas, including Brownsville: Stories, Amigoland, and Where We Come From.

== Early life and education ==
Casares was born and raised in Brownsville, Texas, near the U.S.-Mexico border. Her interest in food developed at an early age, influenced by her mother and grandmother. She earned a Bachelor of Science degree in Home Economics from the University of Texas at Austin.

== Professional career ==
Casares began her career in 1976 at Uncle Ben's Rice, working research and development with a focus on test kitchens and new product development. She later worked in sales and marketing roles within the food industry, representing food manufacturers.

In 1995, Casares co-purchased a Tex-Mex restaurant in Rosenberg, Texas. After separating from her business partner in 1997, she established her own restaurant in Houston, which would become Sylvia's Enchilada Kitchen. The restaurant became known for its focus on enchiladas and other regional Tex-Mex dishes. In subsequent years, she opened additional locations in Houston, including in the Tanglewood (2009) and Energy Corridor (2014) neighborhoods. The Houston Chronicle dubbed Casares "The Enchilada Queen."

Casares appeared on the Food Network's program "Beat Bobby Flay" in 2015. Although she did not win, the appearance led to a publishing contract. Her first cookbook, The Enchilada Queen Cookbook was published by St. Martin's Press in 2016 and received the International Latino Book Award for Best Cookbook in 2017.

In 2022, Casares was named a semifinalist for the Jame Beard Foundation Award in the category of Best Chef: Southwest. In 2024, she launched a retail product line, Sylvia's Signature Sauces, based on recipes from her restaurants. The sauces line expanded to Central Market locations across Texas in 2025.

Publications

Casares has authored:

- The Enchilada Queen Cookbook (St. Martin's Press, 2016)

Her work is also featured in:

- "America The Great Cookbook" edited by Joe Yonan (Simon & Schuster, 2017)

Media Coverage

Casares and her culinary work have been featured in several local and national publications and media programs, including:

- Top 30 Mexican restaurants in Houston
- Top 50 Tex-Mex Restaurants
- Ten Great Mexican Restaurants in the US
- "Beat Bobby Flay" (Food Network)
- Leaders & Legends (Houston CityBook)
- Sylvia Casares, the heart of her iconic Mexican restaurant in Houston (Telemundo)

== Personal life ==
In 2012, Casares was seriously injured in a shooting incident involving a former general manager and partner. She required several months of recovery before returning to her professional activities and has spoken publicly about the impact of the event.

== Current restaurants ==
Sylvia's Enchilada Kitchen (Houston, Texas)

== Awards and recognition ==
- International Latino Book Award, Best Cookbook for The Enchilada Queen Cookbook (2017)
- James Beard Foundation Award Semifinalist, Best Chef: Southwest (2022)
