= A Fonsagrada =

Town in Galicia, Spain

Coordinates: 43.133°N 7.067°W

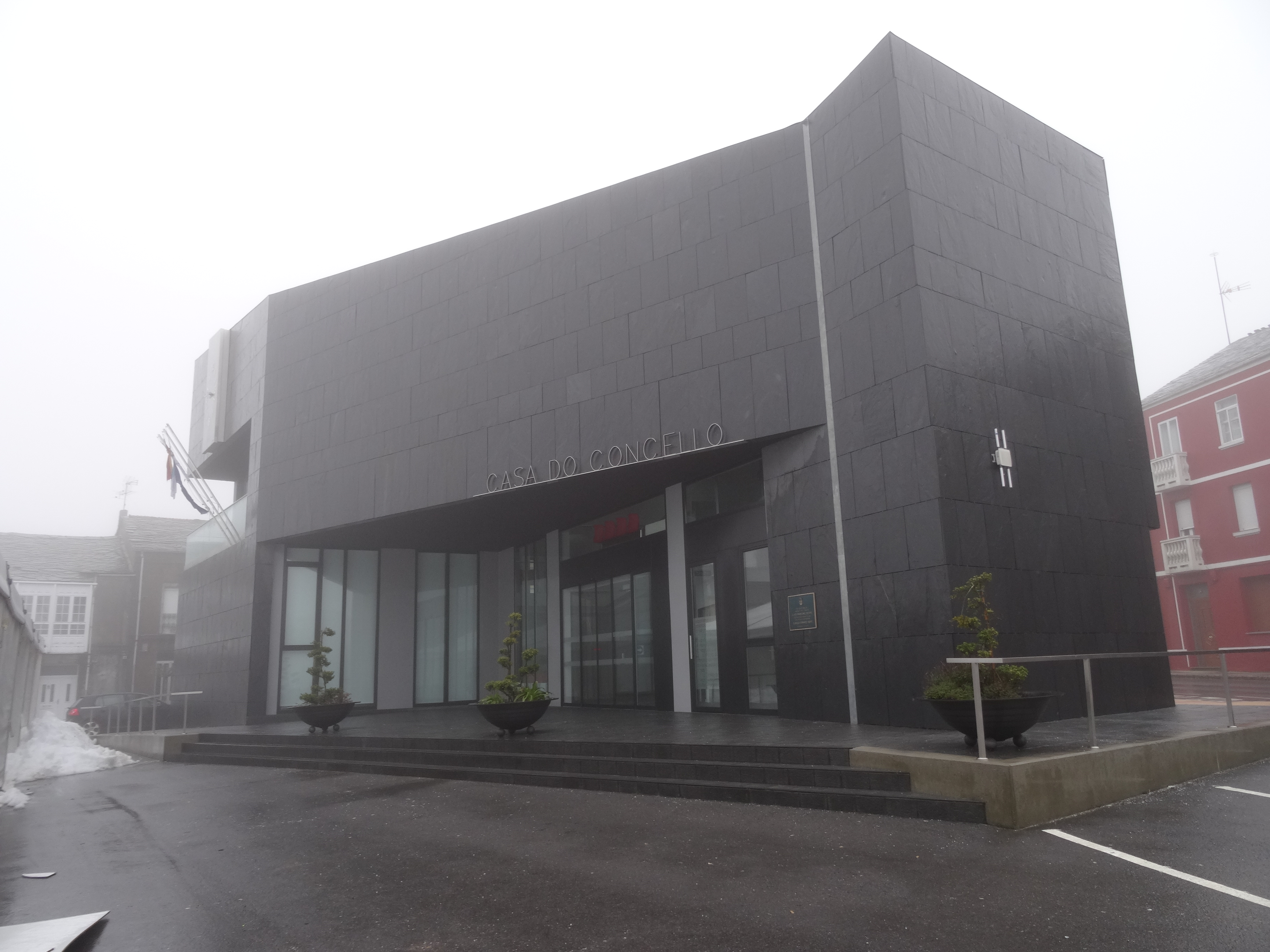
Town hall

Coat of arms

A Fonsagrada is a town and municipality in the province of Lugo in the autonomous community of Galicia in northwest Spain which is 25 miles east-north-east of Lugo by road. Its population in 2004 was 5,007. A Fonsagrada is situated 965m (3166 feet) above sea-level on the watershed between the rivers Rodil and Suarna. Historically it was an important market for a variety of agricultural produce, and it manufactured linen and frieze for local trading.

The history of Fonsagrada (traditional name) is linked to the pilgrimage Camino de Santiago. A variant of the Way, the Camino Primitivo, (the original path) goes through the municipality.

== History ==
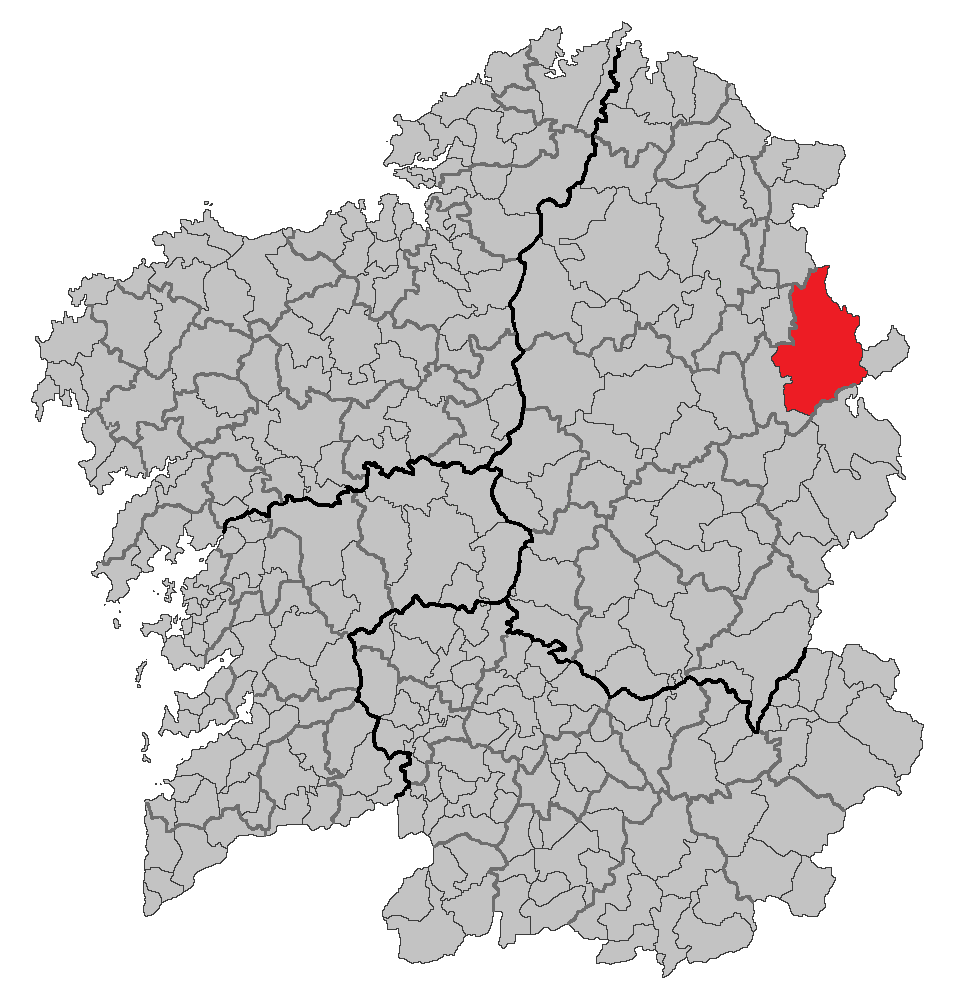
Location of A Fonsagrada in Galicia

The City Council of Burón was composed of the existing councils of Fonsagrada and Negueira de Muñiz. Subsequently, the council of Negueira de Muñiz separated from Fonsagrada. In 1943 the provincial council elected its mayor Benjamin Alvarez Fernandez to the position of prosecutor in courts in the First Legislature of the Spanish Courts (1943–1946), representing the municipalities of this province.

== Camino primitivo ==
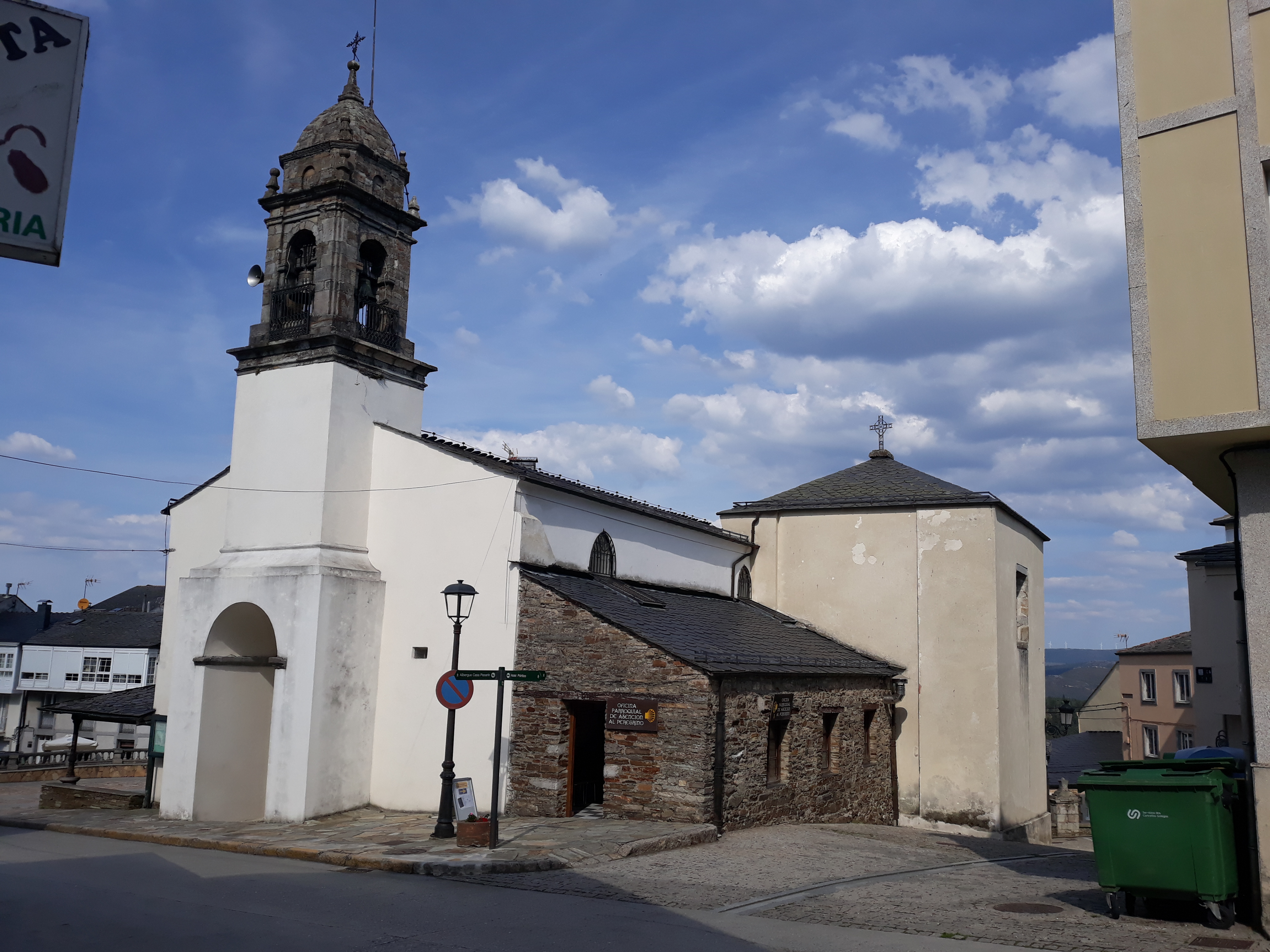
The parish church, dedicated to St. Mary

The "primitive way" to Santiago refers to a stretch between Oviedo and Palas de Rei. It enters Galicia through Fonsagrada, among whose landmarks is the "New Royal Hospital of Santiago de Montouto", a half-ruined building, which was used by pilgrims. This hospital has its origin in the "Old Royal Hospital of Santiago de Montouto", founded by Pedro I "The cruel". The hospital gives its name to a local mountain range, the "Serra do Hospital".

== Carnivals and festivals ==
A Fonsagrada and its villages have a particular tradition of celebrating carnival or Antroido. During these festivals the lights are turned off and torches are turned on (locally called "fachas" in Galician), after which the people leave for a pilgrimage.

Also noteworthy is the "Feria de Septiembre," or "September Fair" in English, one of the largest and most traditional livestock festivals in the province of Lugo. However, due to the abandonment of many small farms in nearby villages, its importance was lost in the late 20th century.

The "Feria del emigrantes," or "Fair of Emigrants" in English, is held in early or mid-August and has become more important than the "Feria de Septiembre." It is celebrated as a reunion with those that left and never came back - but returned to the area for vacations.

The Day of Galicia, 25 July, is held next to the "New Royal Hospital of Santiago de Montouto" in the parish of Padrón. It is held in a chapel that was recently built for a procession in honor of St. James.

== Vegetation ==
Almost the entire region, except for a few villages, is located in mountainous areas, so the vegetation is relatively poor. The region has Atlantic Mountain Forest vegetation with some Mediterranean characterisics, with no oaks or orange trees.

Pines were repopulated in the area. The native black pine is considered extinct in the region.

== Civil parishes ==
- A Allonca
- Arroxo
- A Bastida
- A Fonsagrada
- Bruicedo
- Carballido
- Cereixido
- Cuíñas
- Fonfría
- Freixo
- Lamas de Campos
- Lamas de Moreira
- Logares
- Maderne
- Monteseiro
- Neiro
- Pacios
- O Padrón
- Paradavella
- Piñeira
- A Proba de Burón
- San Pedro de Río
- Suarna
- A Trapa
- O Trobo
- A Veiga de Logares
- Vieiro
- Vilabol de Suarna
- Vilar de Cuíña

== Wildlife ==
Wildlife includes the rare Kerry slug.
