= Casares =

Casares may refer to:

== Places ==
- Casares, Málaga, a town and municipality in Andalusia, Spain
- Casares, Asturias, a parish in the Principality of Asturias, Spain
- Casares de las Hurdes, a municipality in Extremadura, Spain
- Vicente Casares, a village in Buenos Aires province, Argentina

== Other uses ==
- Casares (surname)
