= Quirós =

- Municipality
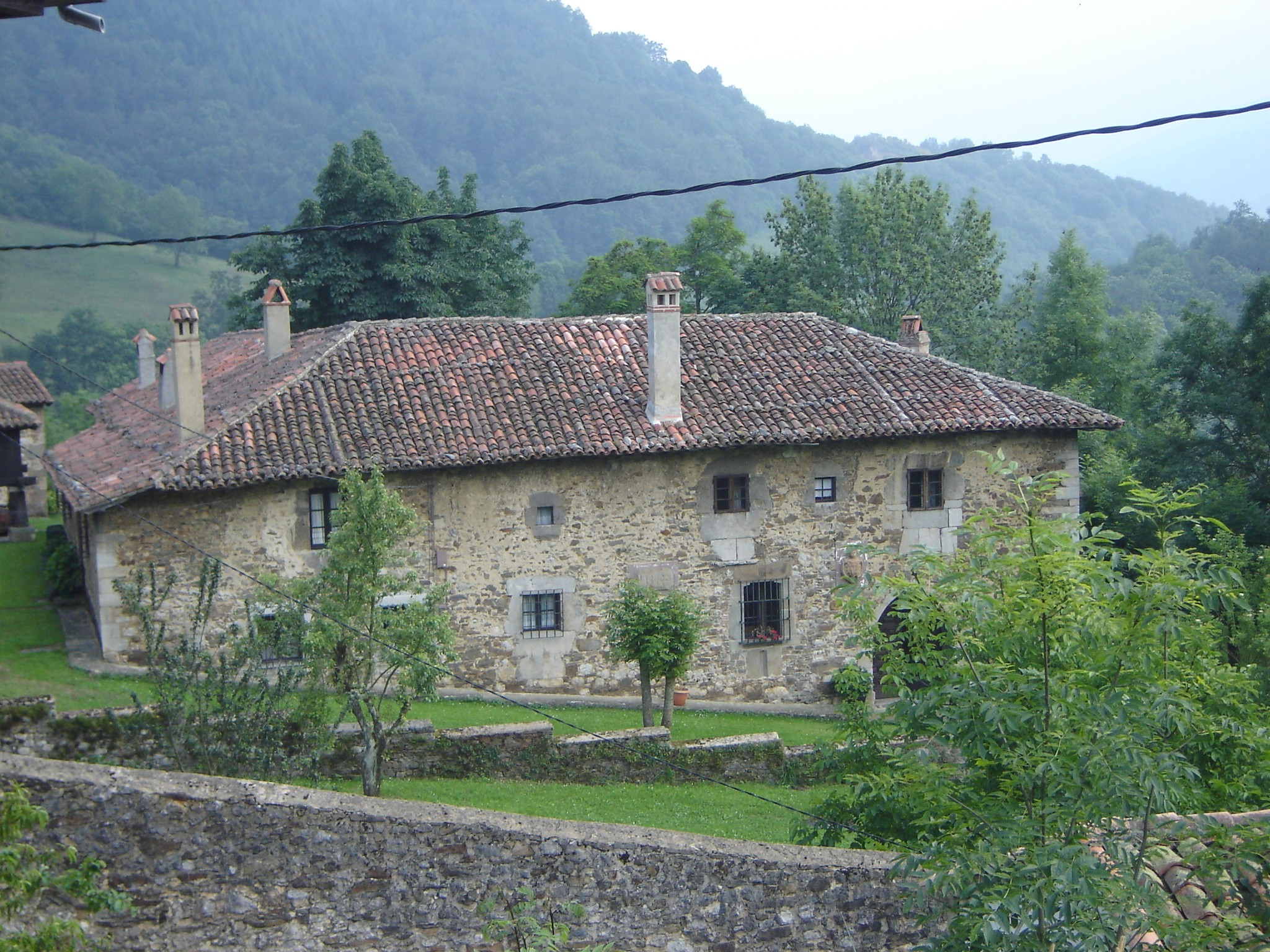
- Miranda-Quirós Palace in Llanuces

- Coat of arms

- Location in Spain
- Coordinates: 43°8′N 5°58′W
- Country: Spain
- Autonomous community: Asturias
- Province: Asturias
- Comarca: Oviedo
- Judicial district: Lena
- Capital: Bárzana

Government
  - Alcalde: Agustín Farpón Alonso (PSOE)

Area
  - Total: 208.79 km^{2} (80.61 sq mi)
- Highest elevation: 2,417 m (7,930 ft)

Population (2025-01-01)
  - Total: 1,142
  - Density: 5.470/km^{2} (14.17/sq mi)
- Demonym: quirosano
- Time zone: UTC+1 (CET)
  - Summer (DST): UTC+2 (CEST)
- Postal code: 33115 a 33118
- Website: www.quiros.es

Quirós is a municipality in the Autonomous Community of the Principality of Asturias, Spain. To the southeast is the municipality of Lena, to the south lies the Autonomous Community of León, to the northeast Riosa and Morcín, to the north is Santo Adriano, to the northwest is Proaza, and to the west is Teverga. Castillo de Alba was a notable fortress here in medieval times, today in ruins.

== Overview ==
The province is within the Cantabrian Mountains and around 30 kilometres from the Asturian capital city of Oviedo. The municipality is a small one, encompassing some 40 towns and villages. Much of the municipality is protected landscape. There are numerous species of flora, including oak trees, chestnut trees, holly, birch trees and groves of alder. Local wildlife includes bears, wolves, foxes, otters, squirrels, wild boars, eagles, vultures and trout. The economy is based on cattle ranching, tourism and farming.

== Parishes ==
- Arroxo
- Bárzana
- Bermiego
- Casares
- Chanuces
- Cinfuegos
- Las Agüeras
- Ḷḷindes
- Murieḷḷos
- Nimbra
- Pedroveya
- Ricao
- Salceo

== See also ==
- List of municipalities in Asturias
