= Chanuces =

Parish in Asturias, Spain

Coordinates: 43.15°N 5.916667°W

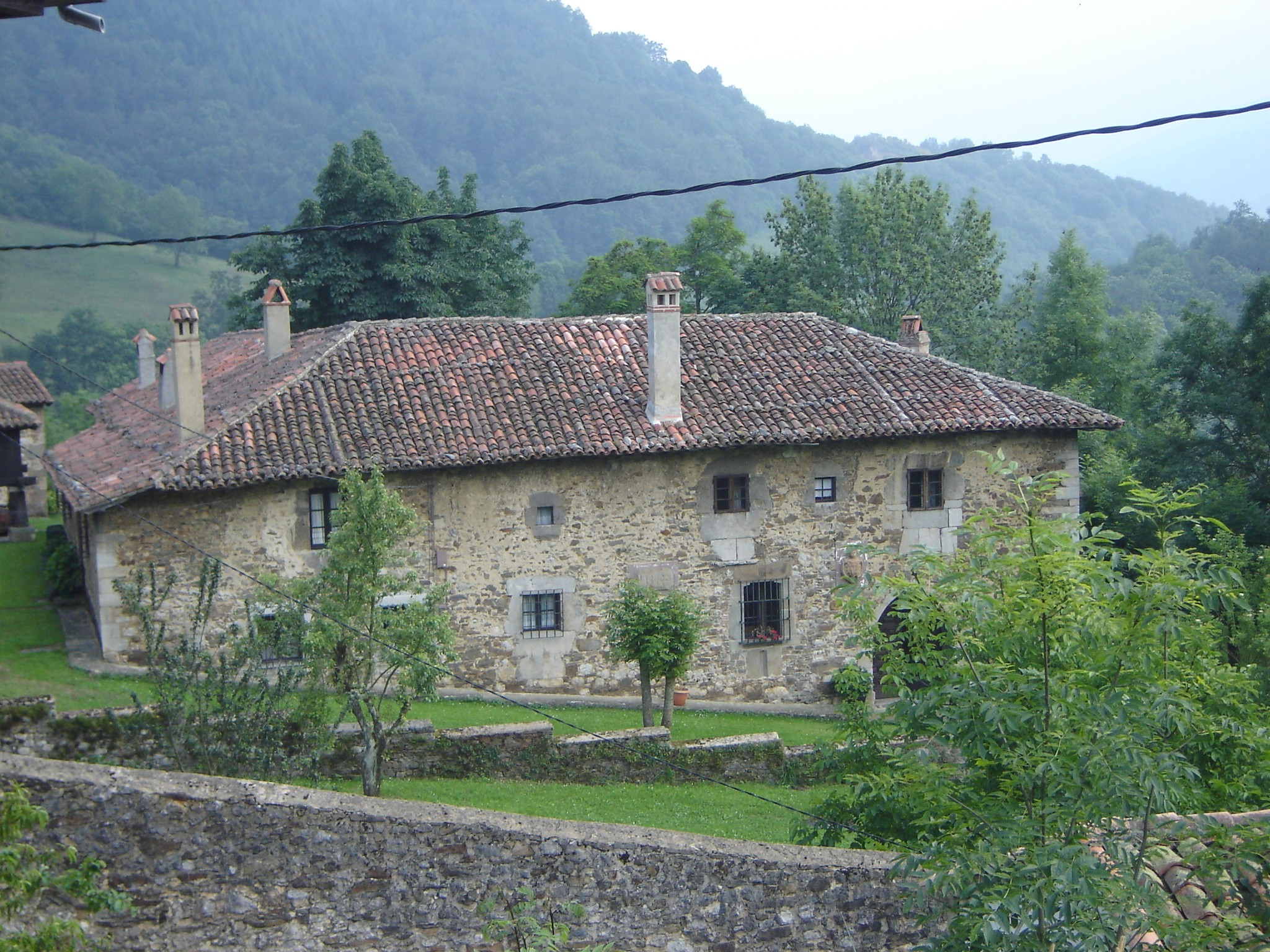
Miranda-Quirós Palace in Chanuces

Chanuces is one of thirteen parishes (administrative divisions) in Quirós, a municipality within the province and autonomous community of the Principality of Asturias, in northern Spain.

The population is 37.

== Villages ==
- Chanuces
- El Grandizu
- La Cereizal
- Murias
