= Nimbra =

Coordinates: 43.14144°N 5.97091°W

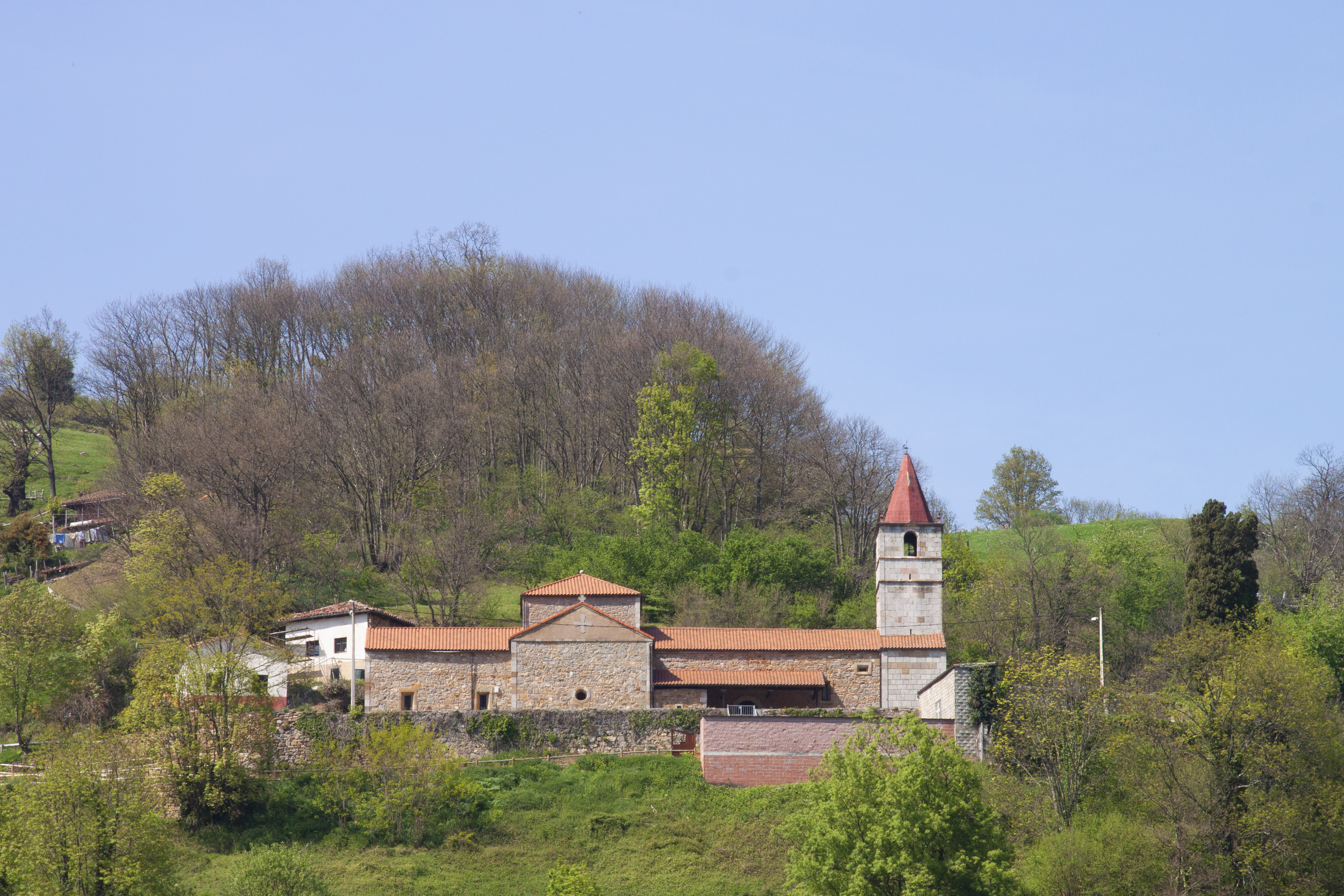
Nimbra

Nimbra is one of thirteen parishes in Quirós, a municipality within the province and autonomous community of Asturias, in coastal northern Spain.

The parroquia is 14.98 km^{2} (5.78 sq mi) in size, with a population of about 125 in 2011. The parish church is dedicated to St. Vincent. Its villages include:

- L'Aguadina
- Cabanieḷḷas
- Rodiles
- Ronderos
- San Vicente de Nimbra
- Viḷḷaxime
- Viḷḷamarcel
- Viḷḷasante
