= Chanos de Somerón =

Parish of Lena, Asturias, Spain

Coordinates: 43.0230°N 5.4722°W

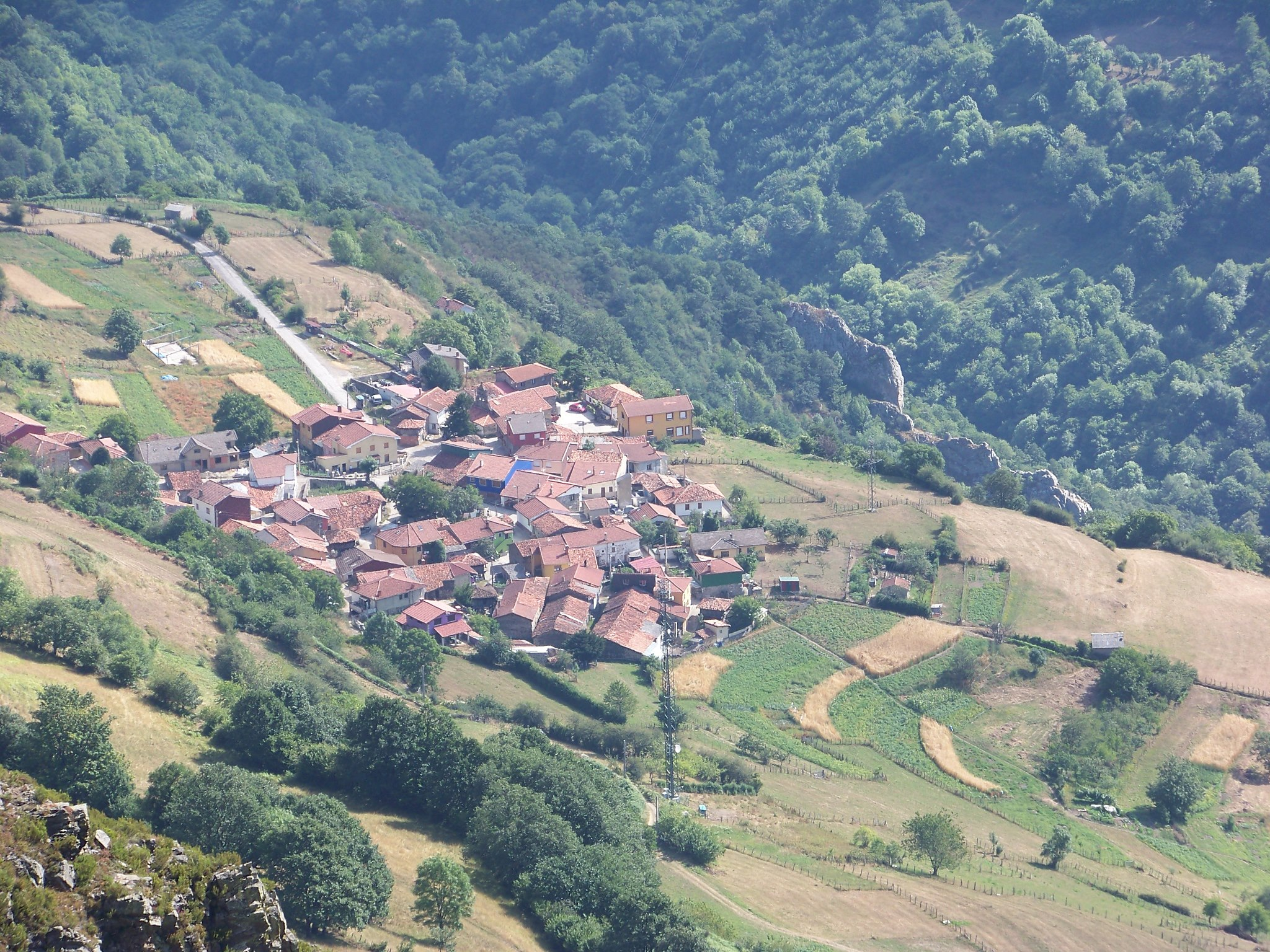
Chanos.

Chanos de Somerón (Llanos in Spanish) is one of 24 parishes (administrative divisions) in Lena, a municipality within the province and autonomous community of Asturias, in coastal northern Spain. The parroquia is 4.04 km^{2} (1.56 sq mi) in size, with a population of 32.

Chanos is the only village in the parroquia. It is well known because of its famous peas (arbeyos in Asturian).
