= Bermiego Yew =

Coordinates: 43.200930°N 5.984258°W

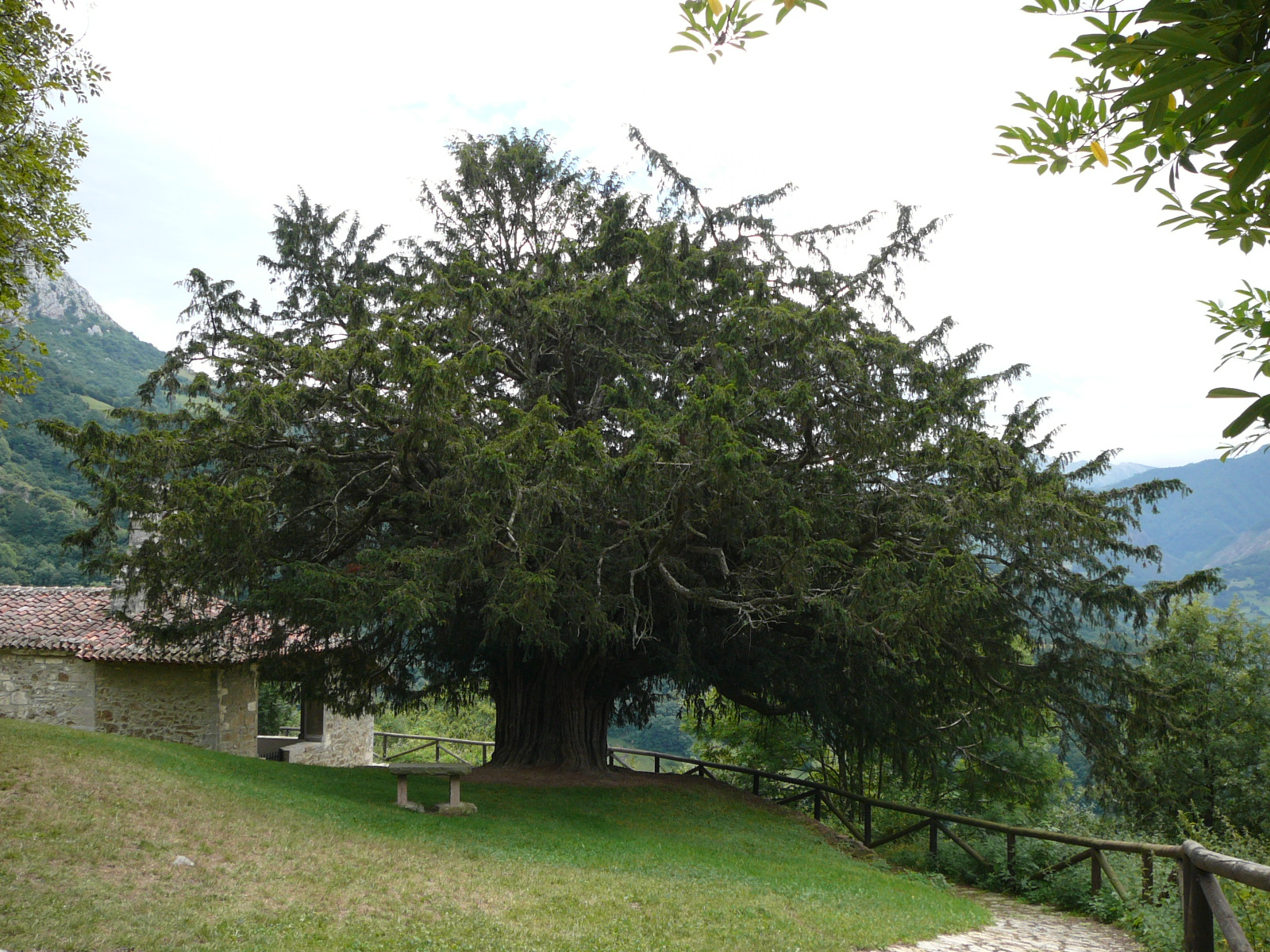
Bermiego Yew

Bermiego Yew, also called in Asturias "Teixu l'Ilesia" is an ancient tree of the species Taxus baccata growing in the village of Bermiego in the Principality of Asturias, northern Spain on the western slope of the Sierra del Aramo. The tree can be found just outside the village within the precincts of the village chapel of Santa Maria de Bermiego.

The morphology of the Bermiego Yew is almost perfect. Its crown measures 15 meters and is 10 meters high, and the trunk is from 6.5 to 7 meters in circumference.

This ancient yew is one of the oldest yews in Europe with about 2,000 years and it was declared a natural monument on April 27, 1995, so that it is protected, and included in the conservation plan for the natural treasures of Asturias.

== See also ==
- List of oldest trees
- List of individual trees
- Fortingall Yew
