= Salceo =

Coordinates: 43.483333°N 5.733333°W

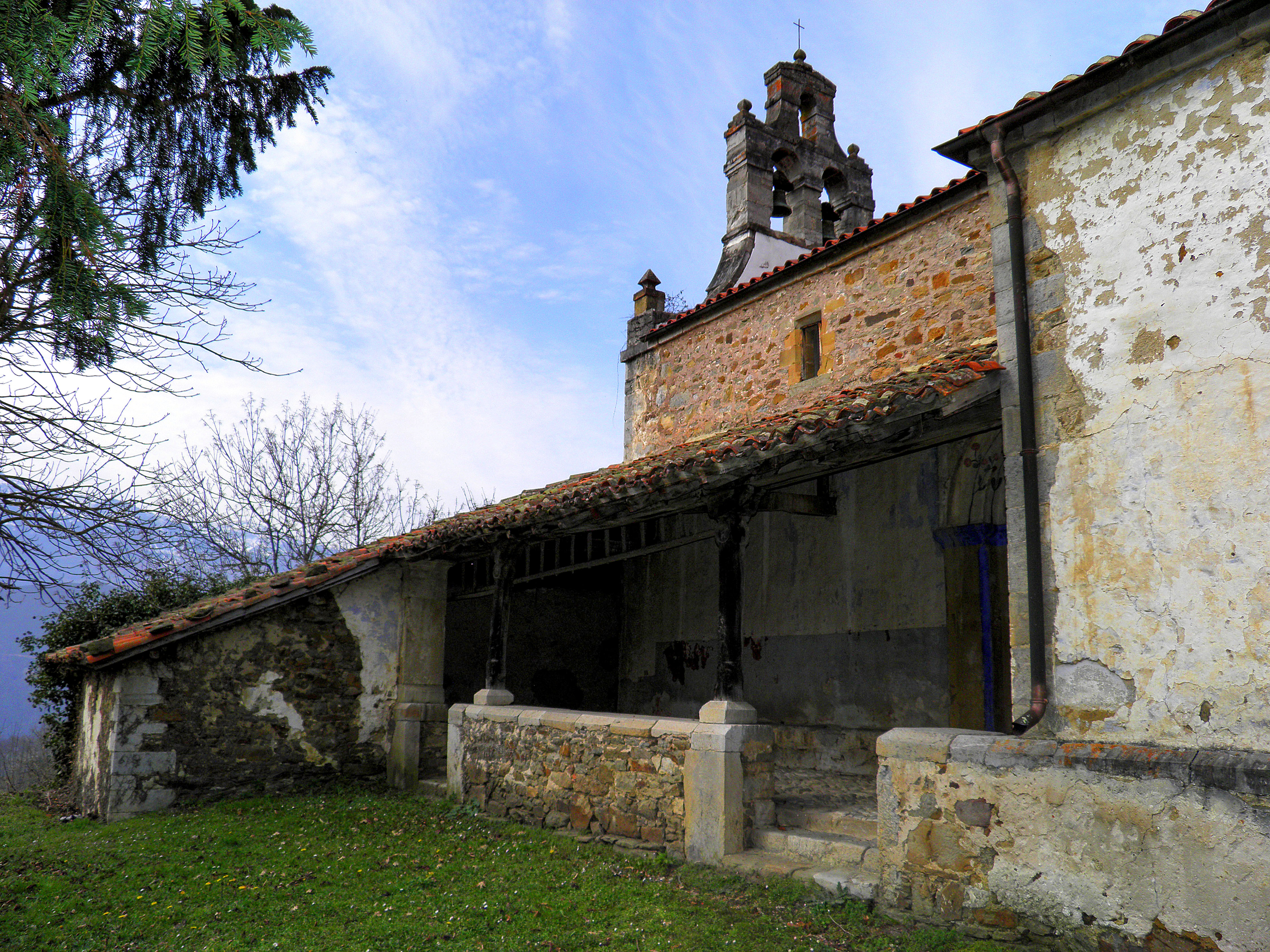
Salceo

Salceo is one of thirteen parishes (administrative divisions) in Quirós, a municipality within the province and autonomous community of the Principality of Asturias, in northern Spain.

The population is 112 (INE 2011).

== Villages ==
- Salceo
  - Eros
  - La Escuela
  - La Iglesia
  - El Quinte
  - La Senra
  - Las Vaḷḷinas
  - La Calecha
  - La Canal
  - El Cantu
  - La Casa Blanca
  - Las Casas del Toroxo
  - La Fonte'l Barrio
  - La Fonte la Gotsa
  - El Reguerón
  - El Rozo
  - El Vaḷḷe
  - El Viḷḷén
  - El Xestro
  - La Viḷḷa
  - El Barrio
  - El Cabo la Viḷḷa
  - El Campón
  - El Cantu
  - El Fuexu
  - La Pandieḷḷa
- Viḷḷar de Salceo
  - El Cantón
  - La Capilla de las Nieves
  - El Tsarcón
