= Castillo de Alba (Quirós) =

Spanish fortress in Quirós, Asturias, Spain

Castillo de Alba is a Spanish fortress in Quirós, Asturias, Spain, near the village of Faedo.

== History ==
It was founded by first Asturian kings to defend the mountain valley from Muslim attacks. In the 12th century it fell into the hands of the rebel Count Gonzalo Peláez, in the reign of Urraca of León and Castile. It subsequently became part of the Church of Oviedo following a donation by Ferdinand II of León. In 1372 the bishop of Oviedo entrusted the castle to Gonzalo Bernaldo de Quirós, but soon Enrique II of Castile returned it to the bishopric.

Today, the castle is in ruins and only several walls, a cistern and the gateway are preserved.
