= Cinfuegos =

Coordinates: 43.133333°N 5.933333°W

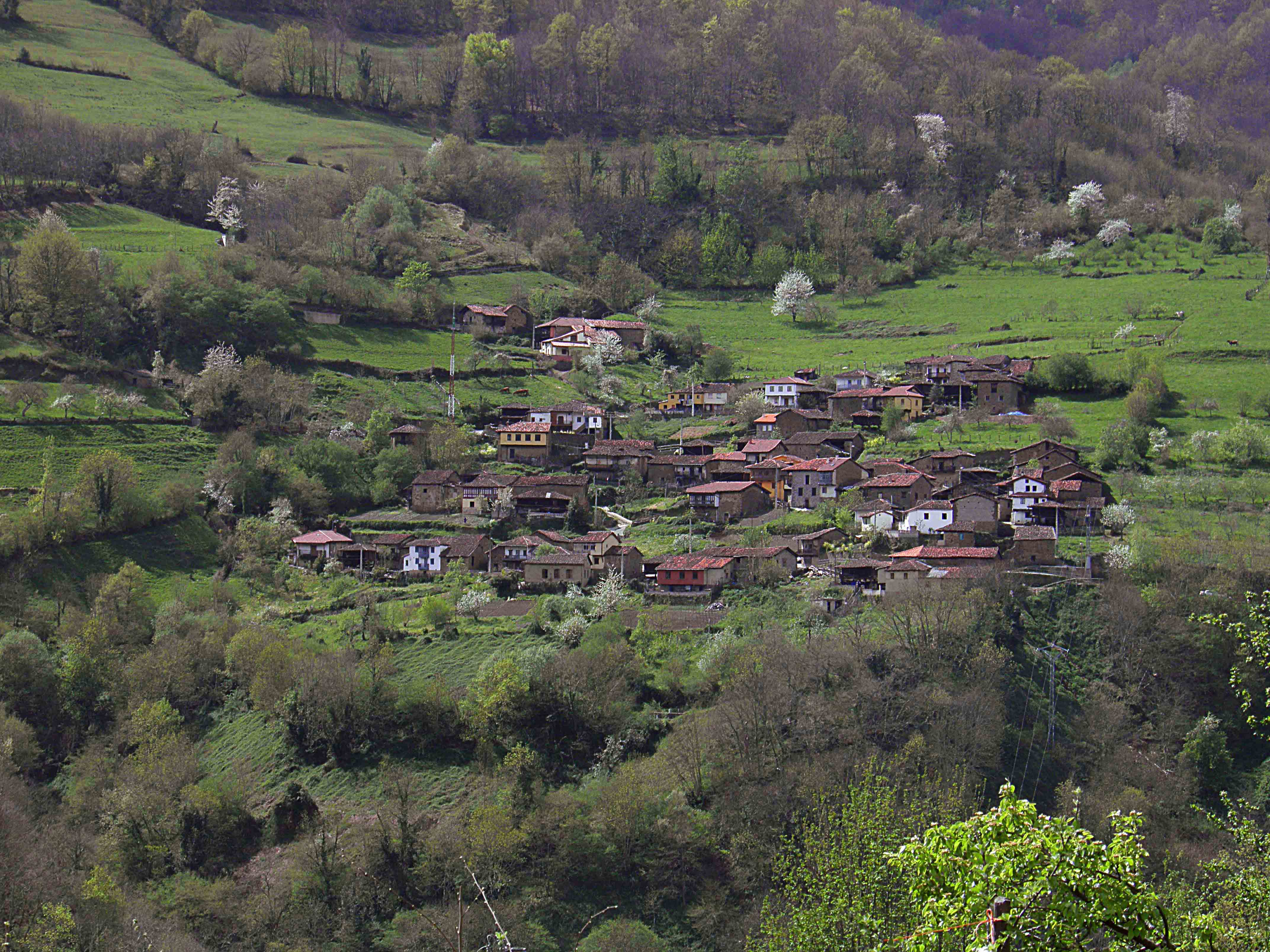
Cinfuegos

Cinfuegos is one of thirteen parishes (administrative divisions) in Quirós, a municipality within the province and autonomous community of the Principality of Asturias, in northern Spain. The population is 81 (2010).

== Villages ==
- Cinfuegos - Pop. 22
- Cuevas - Pop. 3
- El Molín - Pop. 19
- Las Chanas - Pop. 0
- Viḷḷar de Cinfuegos - Pop. 37
