= Carabanzo =

Parish of Lena, Asturias, Spain

Coordinates: 43.18585°N 5.78559°W

Carabanzo is one of 24 parishes (administrative divisions) in Lena, a municipality within the province and autonomous community of Asturias, in coastal northern Spain.

Its origins date to Roman times. Its name is a variant of the Latin carabantium (caravan).

The parroquia is 2.92 km^{2} (1.13 sq mi) in size, with a population of about 220.
