= Bárzana =

Coordinates: 43.15°N 5.966667°W

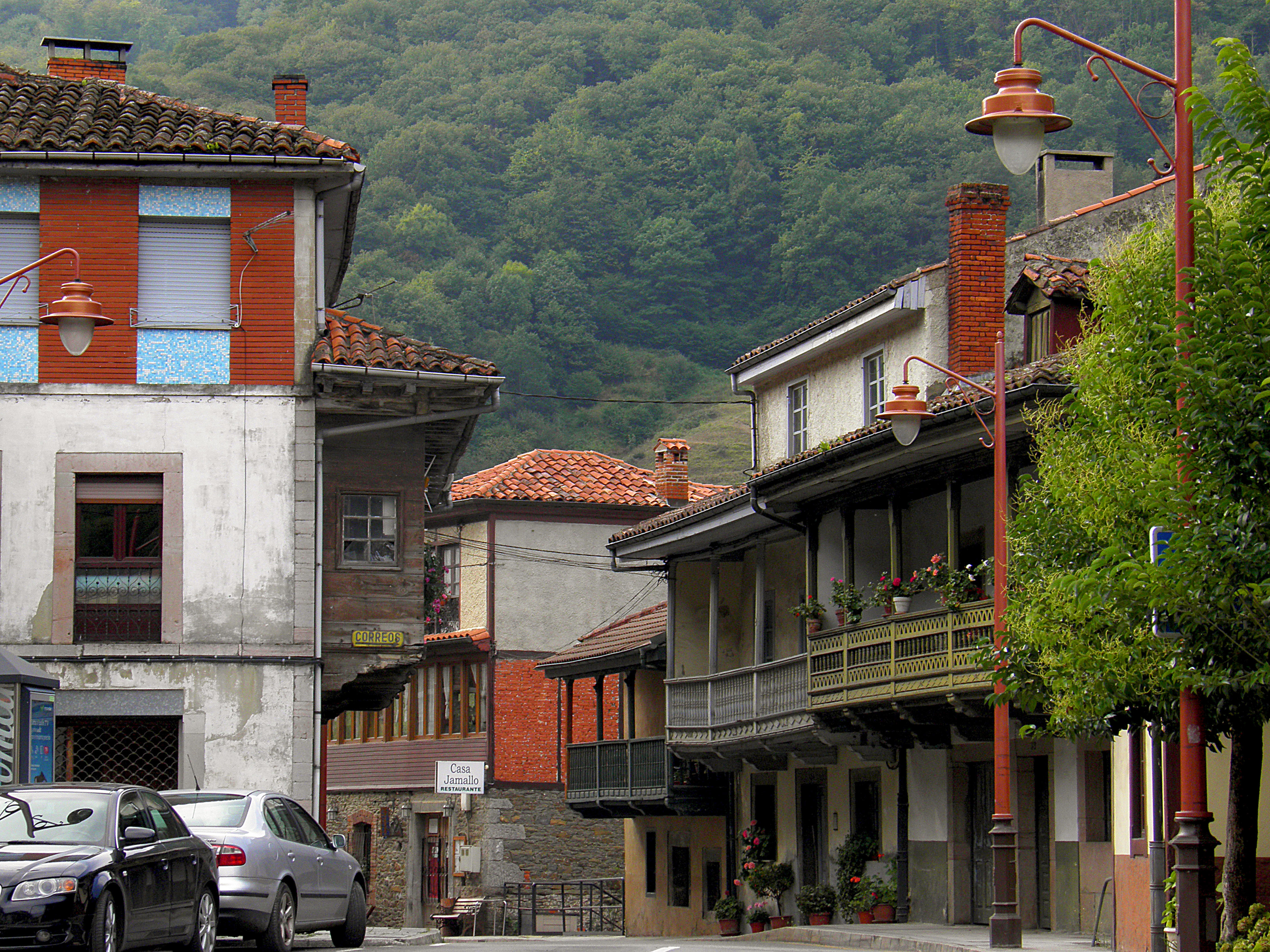
Bárzana

Bárzana is one of thirteen parishes (administrative divisions) in Quirós, a municipality within the province and autonomous community of the Principality of Asturias, in northern Spain.

The population is 497.

== Villages ==
- L'Arroxín
- Bárzana
- La Casa Vide
- Cuañana
- El Pando
- Pontonga
- Rano
- El Regustiu
- Santa Marina
- Vaḷḷín
