= Casares (surname) =

Casares is a surname. Notable people with the surname include:

- Adolfo Bioy Casares (1914–1999), Argentine fiction writer
- Ana Casares (died 2007), Polish-American actress
- Carlos Casares (governor) (1830–1883), Argentine rancher, executive, and politician
- Carlos Casares (writer) (1941–2002), Spanish Galician language writer
- Daniel Casares (born 1980), Spanish flamenco guitarist and composer
- Julio Casares (born 1961), Brazilian creative director and football chairman
- María Casares (1922–1996), French actress, daughter of Santiago Casares Quiroga
- Olga Casares Pearson (1896–1980), Argentine actress
- Orlando Casares, Argentine football coach
- Oscar Casares (born 1964). American writer and professor of creative writing
- Rick Casares (1931–2013), American footballer
- Roberto Casares (born 1964), Spanish table tennis player
- Santiago Casares Quiroga (1884–1950), Spanish politician who was Prime Minister of Spain when the Civil War broke out
- Viola Casares (born 1944), Mexican labor activist
- Wenceslao Casares (born 1974), Argentine businessman
