= Murieḷḷos =

Coordinates: 43.166667°N 5.933333°W

Muriellos

Murieḷḷos is one of thirteen parishes (administrative divisions) in Quirós, a municipality within the province and autonomous community of the Principality of Asturias, in northern Spain.

There are 31 people living in the parish.

There are two villages in the parish, Murieḷḷos Cimeiru and Viḷḷarecho.
