= Pedroveya =

Coordinates: 43.266667°N 5.966667°W

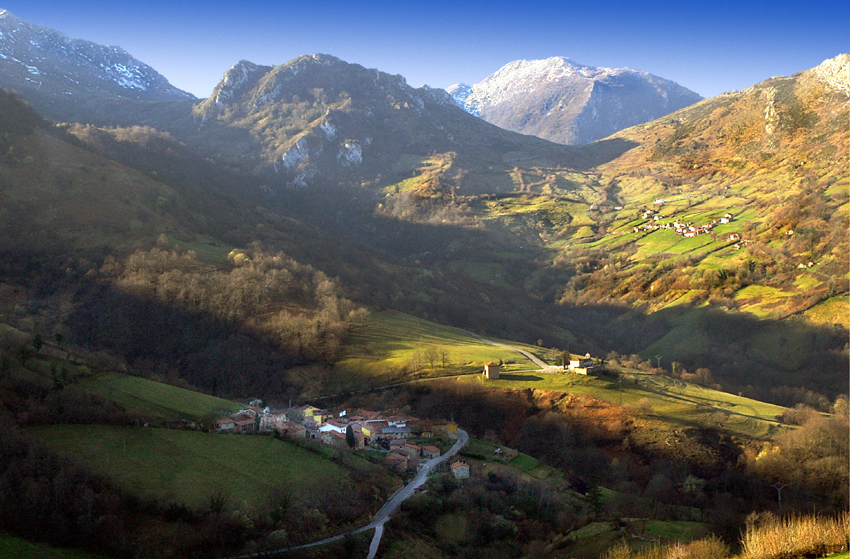
View of Pedroveya

Pedroveya is one of thirteen parishes (administrative divisions) in Quirós, a municipality within the province and autonomous community of the Principality of Asturias, in northern Spain.

The population is 30. (INE 2011)

== Villages ==
- Pedroveya
- La Rebollá
