= Bermiego =

Coordinates: 43.2°N 5.966667°W

Bermiego is one of thirteen parishes (administrative divisions) in Quirós, a municipality within the province and autonomous community of the Principality of Asturias, in northern Spain.

The population is 80 (2009).

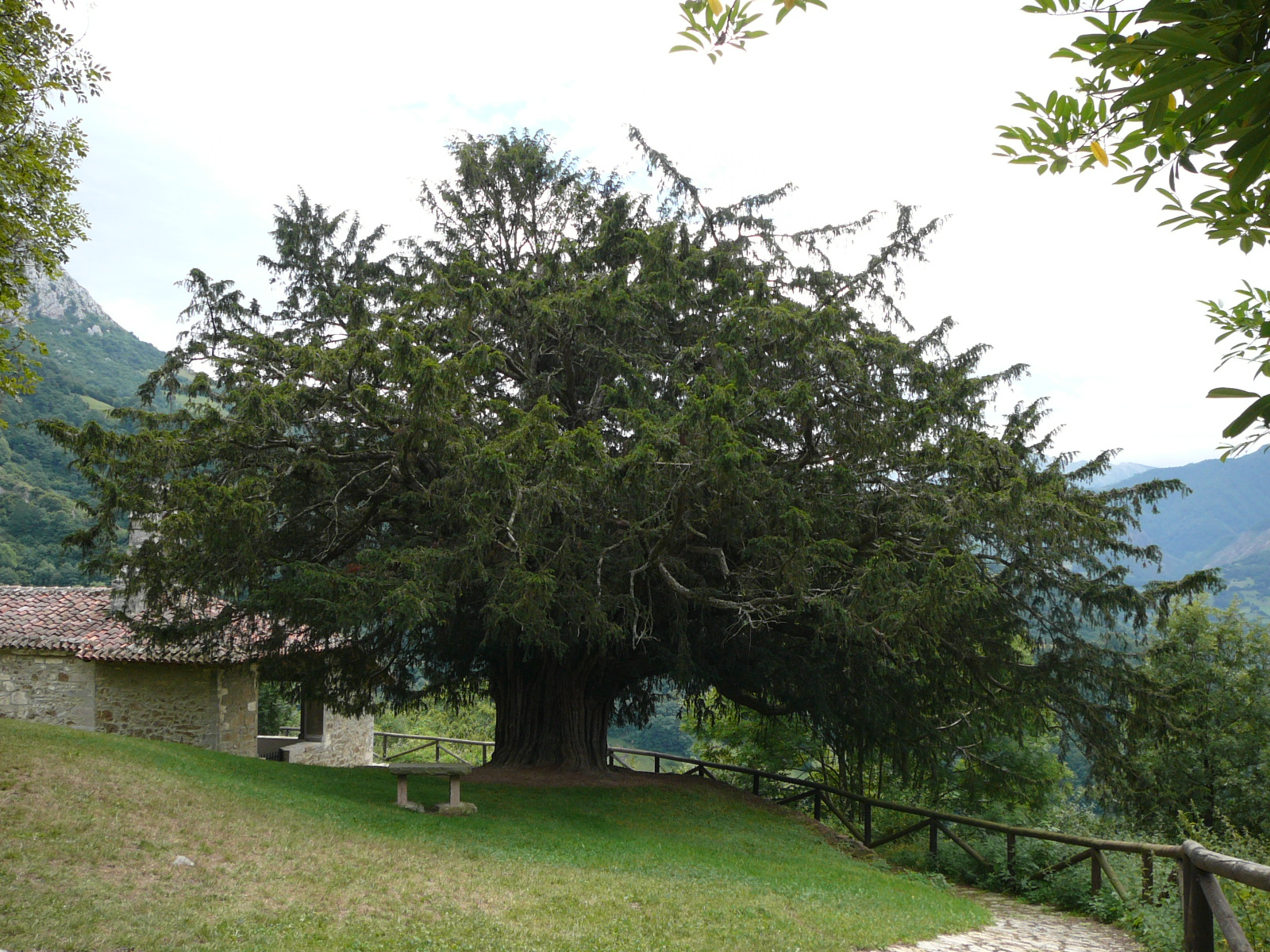
Bermiego Yew

Bermiego village is home to the Bermiego Yew, one of the oldest yew trees in Europe with an age of about 2,000 years. It has been protected as a natural monument since April 27, 1995, and is included in the conservation plan for the natural treasures of Asturias. The tree can be found just outside the village within the precincts of the village chapel of Santa Maria de Bermiego.

== Villages ==
- Bermiego
- Carrexa
