= Las Agüeras =

Coordinates: 43.196389°N 6.014444°W

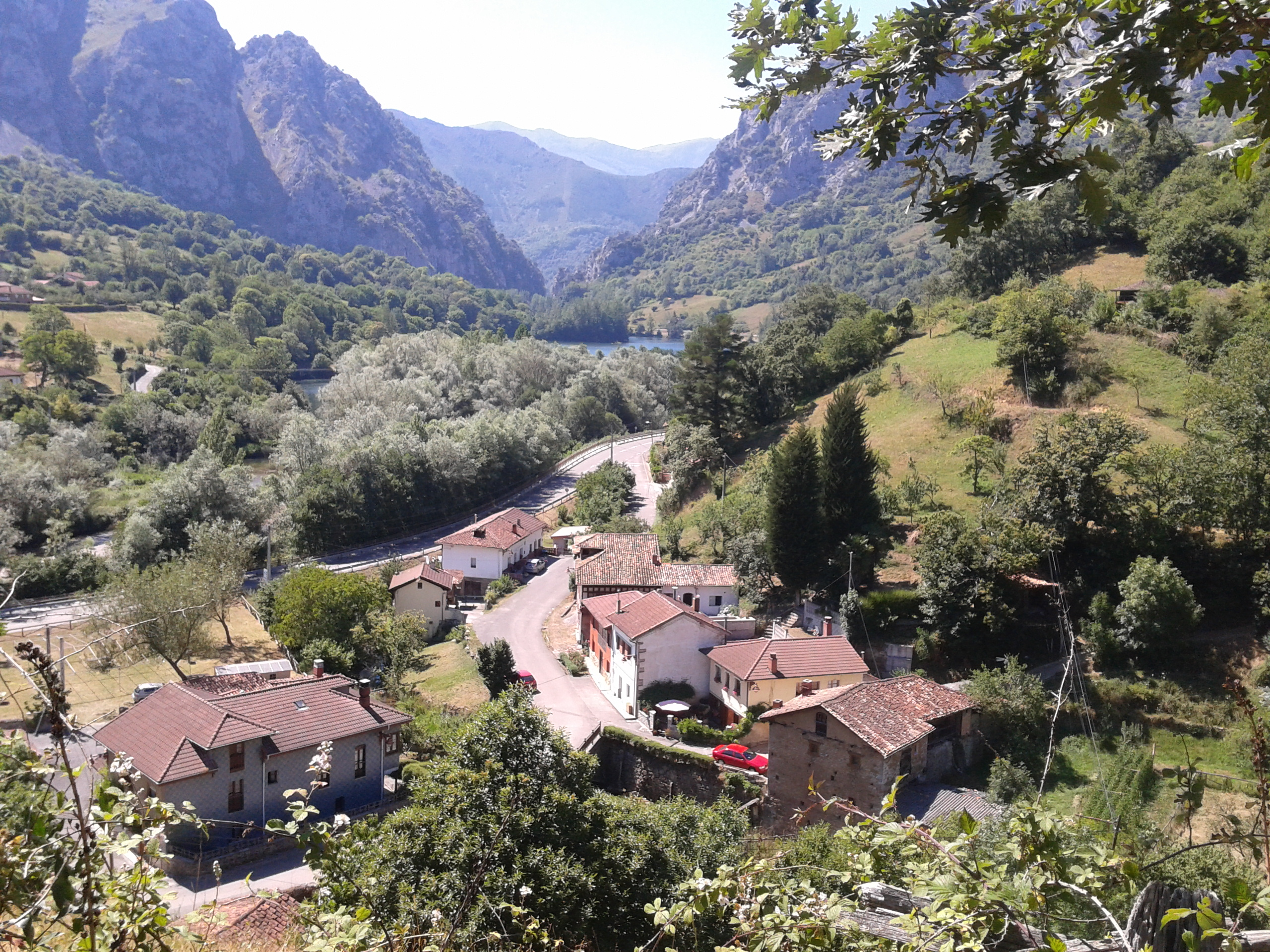
Las Agüeras

Las Agüeras is one of thirteen parishes (administrative divisions) in Quirós, a municipality within the province and autonomous community of the Principality of Asturias, in northern Spain.

The population is 162 (INE 2010).

== Villages ==
- Aciera
- Las Agüeras
- El Carrilón
- Cortina
- Ḷḷano
- Pirueño
- Tene
- Viḷḷuriche
