= Ricao =

Coordinates: 43.116667°N 5.966667°W

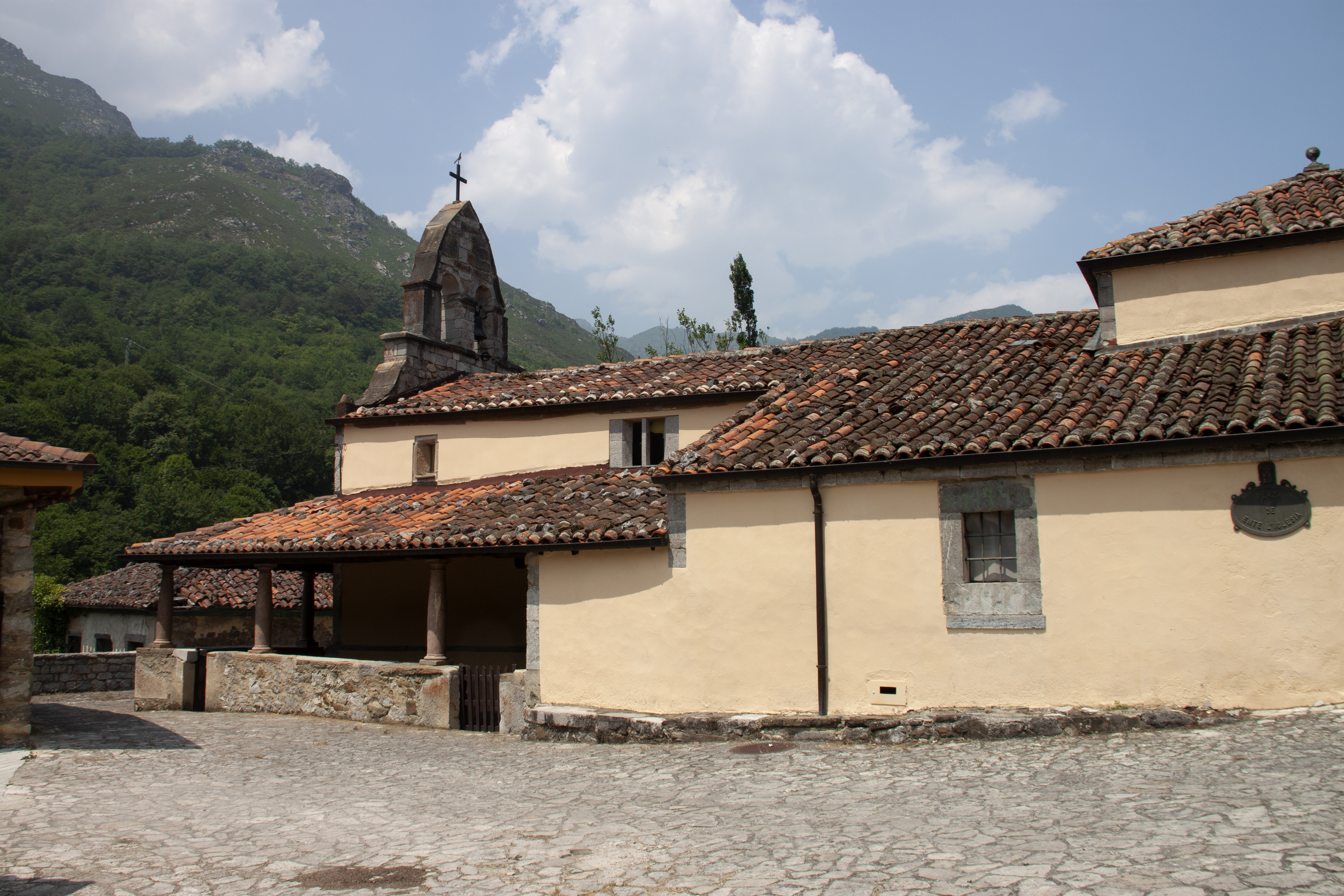
Ricao

Ricao is one of thirteen parishes (administrative divisions) in Quirós, a municipality within the province and autonomous community of the Principality of Asturias, in northern Spain.

The population is 77 (INE 2011).

== Villages ==
- Bueida
  - La Calecha
  - La Casa Nueva
  - La Casa Riba
  - La Castañal
  - El Cotín
  - El Pandieḷḷu
  - El Rabil
  - El Pusaorio
- Ricao
  - El Ḷḷugar de Baxo
  - La Casa Retoral
  - La Cruz de la Segá
  - El Xuegu la Bolera
  - El Ḷḷugar de Riba
  - La Calecha
  - El Campo
  - El Canalón
  - El Cantu
  - El Cantu’l Pandieḷḷu
  - La Casa l’Argaxo
  - El Corral Concecho
  - La Fonte’l Canalón
  - El Pandieḷḷu
  - La Reguerina
  - La Roza
  - El Vaḷḷe
  - El Pesgán
  - El Pradal
  - San Roque
  - Viḷḷanueva
