= Congostinas =

Parish in Lena, Asturias, Spain

Coordinates: 43.10195°N 5.77191°W

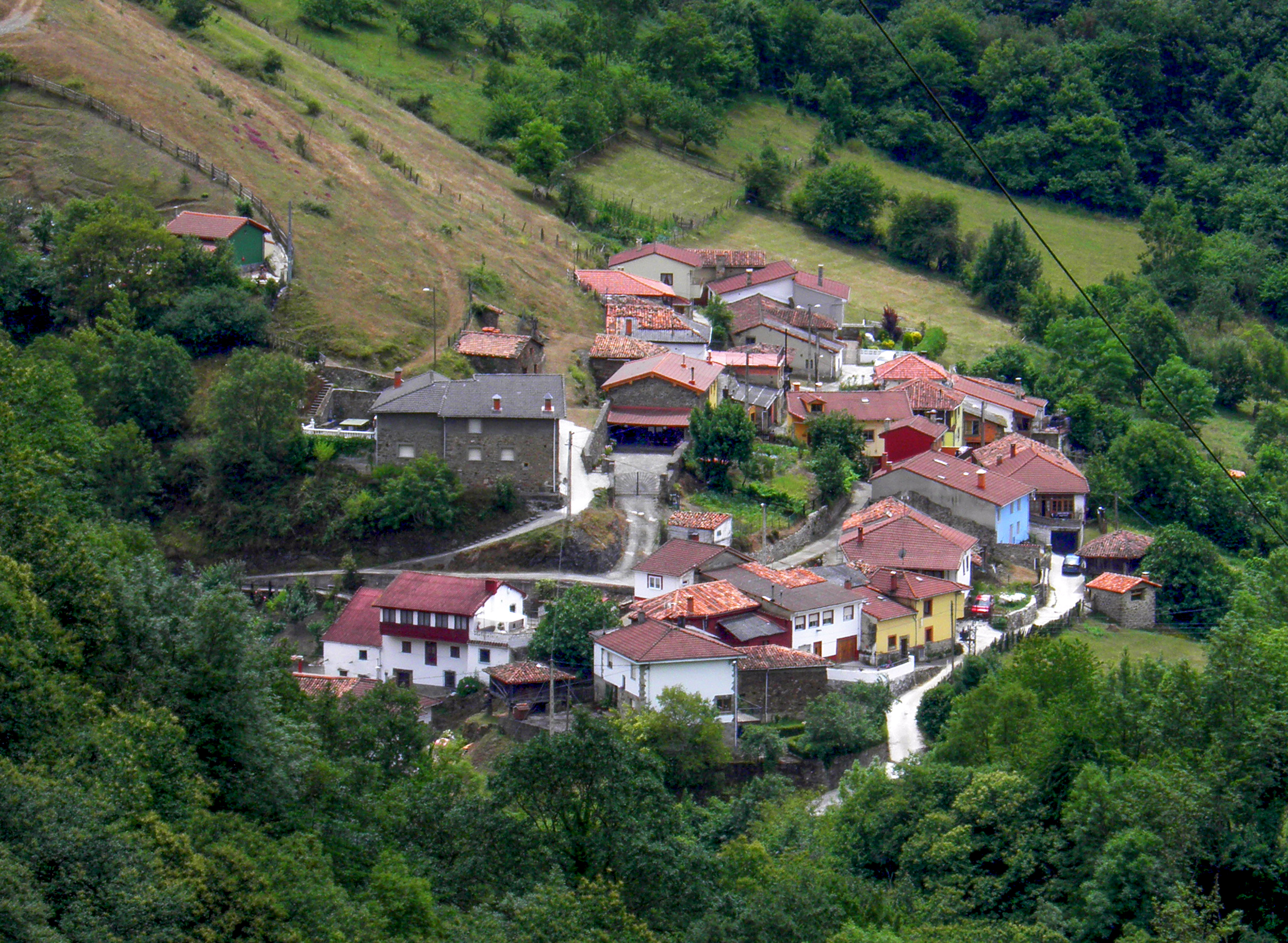
Congostinas, Asturias

Congostinas is one of 24 parishes (administrative divisions) in Lena, a municipality within the province and autonomous community of Asturias, in coastal northern Spain.

The parroquia is 10.9 km^{2} (4.2 sq mi) in size, with a population of under 50. Its post code is 33694.

== Villages ==
The villages of Congostinas include:

- Congostinas
- Ḷḷinares
  - Ḷḷinares de Baxo
  - Ḷḷinares de Riba
  - Misiegos
  - San Pelayo
