= Casares, Asturias =

Parish in Quirós, Asturias, Spain

Coordinates: 43.183333°N 5.983333°W

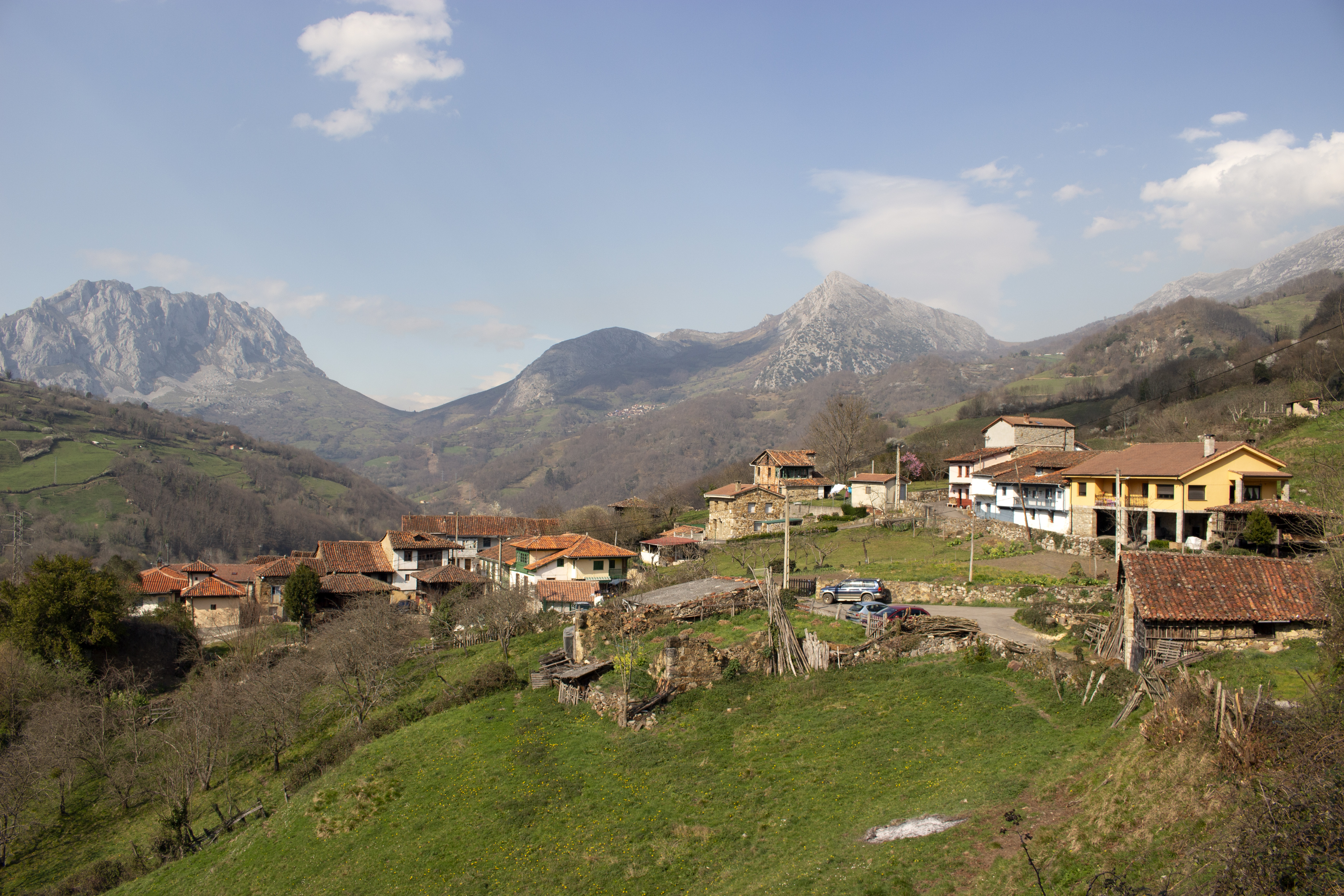
Casares, Asturias

Casares is one of thirteen parishes (administrative divisions) in Quirós, a municipality within the province and autonomous community of the Principality of Asturias, in northern Spain.

The population is 131.

== Villages ==
- Casares
- Faedo
- Fresneo
- La Muela
- La Pachuca
- La Vigutierre
- Toriezo
