= Arroxo =

Coordinates: 43.183333°N 5.983333°W

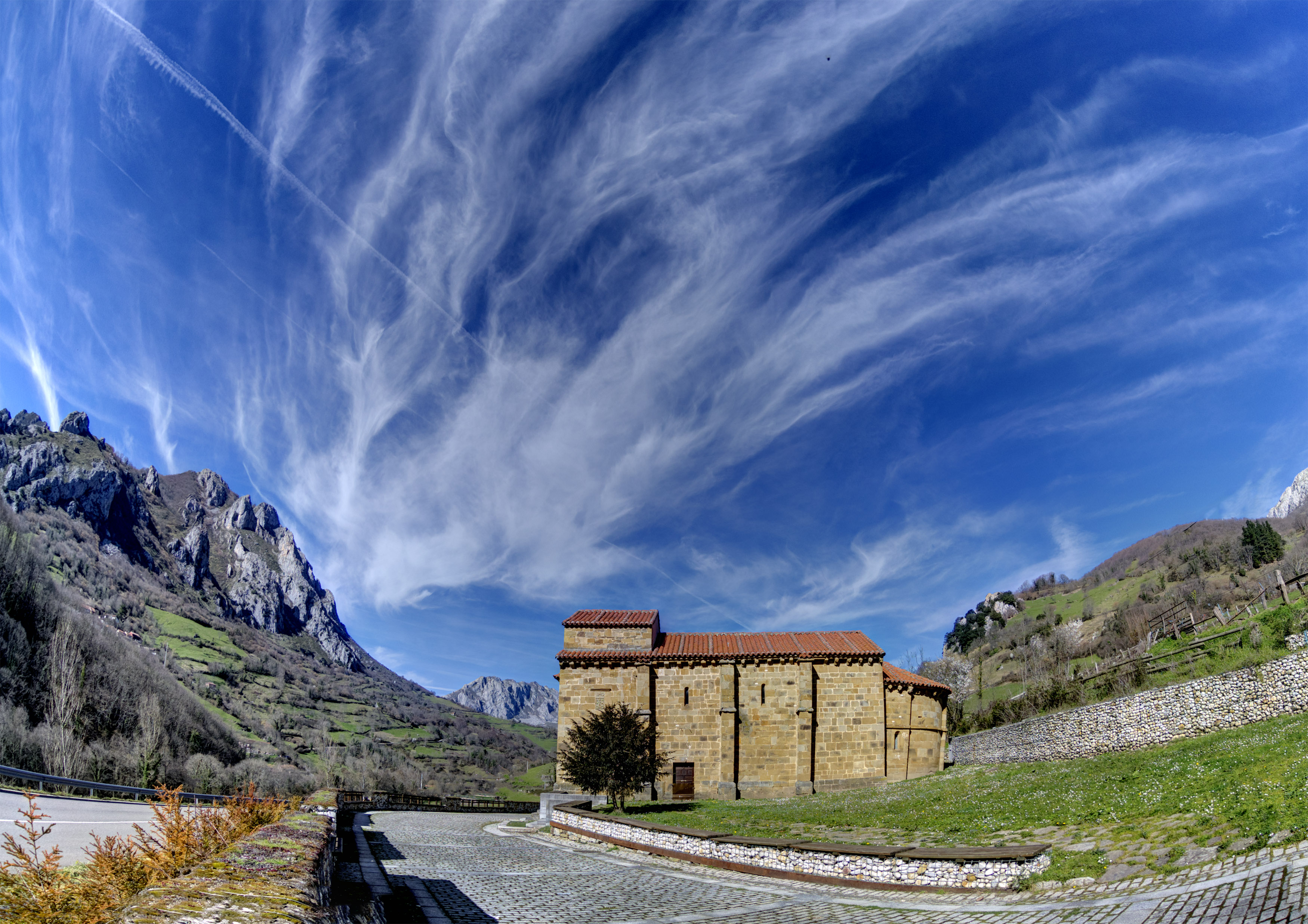
Church of San Pedro in Arroxo.

Arroxo is one of thirteen parishes (administrative divisions) in Quirós, a municipality within the province and autonomous community of the Principality of Asturias, in northern Spain.

The population is 68 in 2011.

== Villages ==
- Arroxo
- El Barón
- El Castañeo
- El Quintanal
- La Fábrica
- San Pedro
- San Salvaor
- Veiga
- Viḷḷagondú

=== Small towns ===
- El Chalé
- La Retoral
- L'Arbechal
- El Campu'l Forno
- La Casa'l Cura
- La Casa Nueva
- El Comercio
- La Conca
- La Estrá
- La Naranxa
- La Quintana
- Sobreforno
- Torales
- El Palacio
- El Campón
- La Casa'l Molín
- Las Casas del Xagarín
- La Casona
- La Curva
- El Molinón
- El Portalón
- El Reculaño
- Los Torales
- La Escuela
- El Reboḷḷal
- La Campa
- El Prauvaḷḷe
- Los Solhorros
