= Zurea =

Parish of the municipality of Lena, in Asturias, Spain

Coordinates: 43.09246°N 5.8482°W

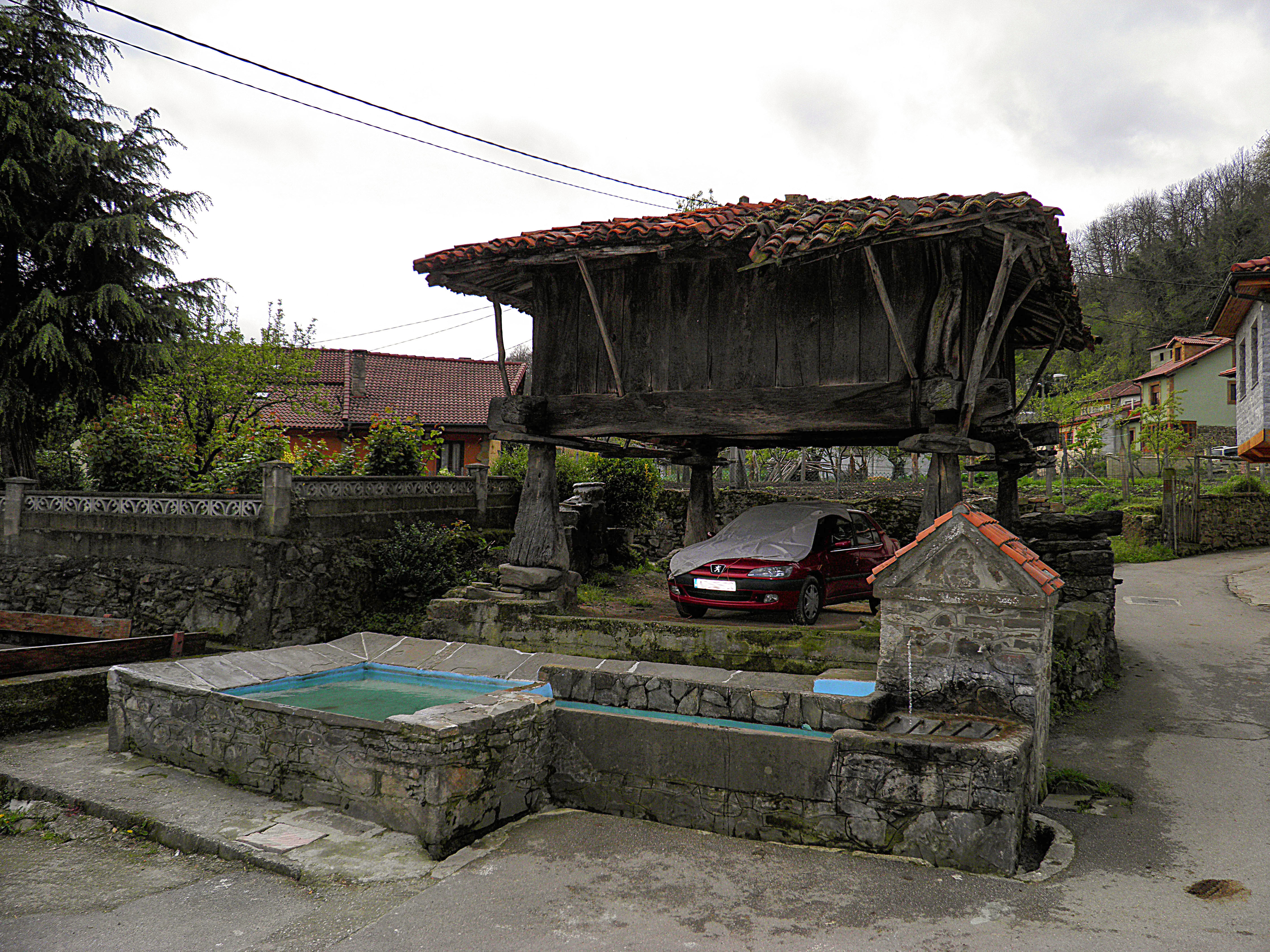
Zureda (Lena, Asturias) 2012

Zurea (Zureda in Spanish) is one of 24 parishes (administrative divisions) in Ḷḷena, a municipality within the province and autonomous community of Asturias, in coastal northern Spain.

The parroquia is 12.92 km^{2} (4.99 sq mi) in size, with a population of about 200.

== Villages ==
The villages of Zureda include:

- Vaḷḷe, population 19 (year 2018)
- Zurea, population 141
- La Viña
