= Amigoland =

Novel by Oscar Casares

- Author: Oscar Cásares
- Publisher: Little, Brown, and Company
- Publication date: August 10, 2009
- ISBN: 978-0-316-15969-2

Amigoland is the first novel by American author Oscar Cásares and a follow-up to his book of short stories, Brownsville. It was published in 2009 by Little Brown and Company. The plot centers on two estranged elderly brothers who reunite after many years to break the elder brother, Don Fidencio, out of his nursing home in Brownsville, Texas and head to Mexico on a quest to solve the mystery of how their family came to America.

== Characters ==
=== Don Fidencio ===
Don Fidencio is a 91-year-old widower, a resident of Amigoland, a Brownsville nursing home, where he's been sent by his daughter and son-in-law. His body is failing him, and he's stuffed with pills – "pills for his heart ... his blood pressure ... his cholesterol ... his kidneys ... his heartburn ... the pain in his legs ... to make him [expletive] ... to make him sleep." He turns the name of the place into an irony: He feels so isolated, he cannot bother to even learn the names of those around him, opting instead for shorthand – "The Gringo With the Ugly Finger," "The One Who Likes to Kiss Your Forehead." He takes pleasure only from his cigarettes.

=== Don Celestino ===
Fidencio’s somewhat younger brother Celestino, also a widower, is now suffering from diabetes. In contrast to his brother, Celestino is still vital enough to start a Viagra-assisted affair with his housekeeper, Socorro.

=== Socorro ===
Socorro is Don Celestino's housekeeper. She is a childless widow three decades younger than Celestino who lives across the border in Matamoros. It's Socorro, seeking a deeper relationship with Celestino, who encourages him to visit his brother after years of estrangement.

== Plot ==
As Fidencio and Celestino catch up, Socorro learns that their falling out concerned a story the old men cannot agree on: Was it true that their "Papa Grande" saw his family killed by Indians and was then kidnapped and brought north? They decide to set out on a four-day bus trip to Linares to search for the truth about their grandfather and about each other.

== Themes ==
The themes of aging, brotherhood, identity and memory figure prominently in Amigoland.

Casares said in an interview that growing up with two elderly parents influenced his work. Amigoland was written as his own father was dying in a nursing home in Brownsville.

== Reception ==
Amigoland received starred reviews from Kirkus Reviews and Publishers Weekly. It was later selected by the 2010 Mayor's Book Club in Austin, Texas for that year's citywide reading campaign.
