= Santa Cristina de Lena =

Church of St. Christine of Lena; Spanish: Iglesia de Santa Cristina de Lena
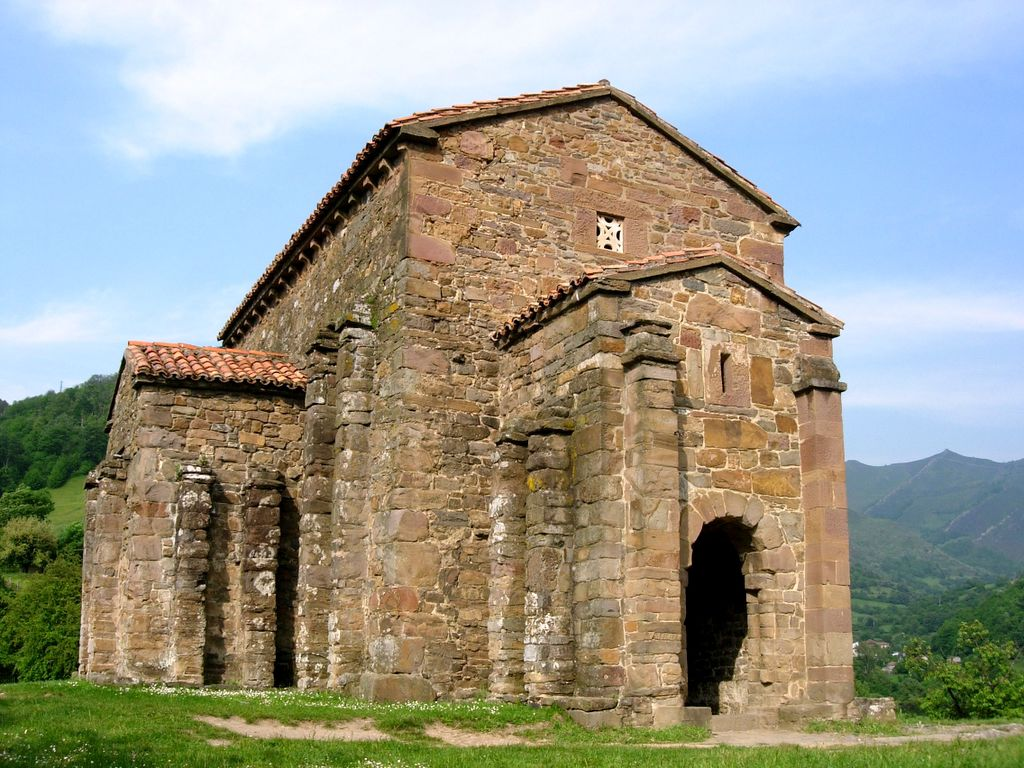

- Location within Spain

Religion
- Affiliation: Roman Catholic
- Ecclesiastical or organisational status: Inactive

Location
- Location: Lena (Asturias), Spain
- Coordinates: 43°7′38.4″N 5°48′51.5″W

Architecture
- Type: Church
- Style: Pre-Romanesque
- Groundbreaking: 7th century
- Completed: 852

Specifications
- Direction of façade: NE
- Length: 16 metres (52 ft)
- Width: 12 metres (39 ft)
- UNESCO World Heritage Site
- Type: Cultural
- Criteria: ii, iv, vi
- Designated: 1985 (9th session)
- Parent listing: Monuments of Oviedo and the Kingdom of the Asturias
- Reference no.: 312bis-003
- Region: Europe and North America
- Spanish Cultural Heritage
- Official name: Ermita de Santa Cristina
- Type: Non-movable
- Criteria: Monument
- Designated: 24 August 1885
- Reference no.: RI-51-0000050

St Christine of Lena (Spanish: Santa Cristina de Lena) is a Roman Catholic Asturian pre-Romanesque church in the Lena municipality of Spain, about 25 kilometres (16 mi) south of Oviedo, on an old Roman road that joined the lands of the plateau with Asturias.

== Description ==
The church has a different ground plan to a typical Pre-Romanesque basilica. It is a single rectangular space with a barrel vault, with four adjoining structures in the centre of each facade. The first of these annexes is the typical Asturian Pre-Romanesque vestibule, with a royal tribune on the upper part, accessed via a stairway joined to one of the walls. To the east is the enclosure with the altar, with a single apse, foregoing the traditional Asturian pre-Romanesque triple apse, and going back to Visigoth influences. To the north and south respectively, there are two other enclosures through semicircular arches and barrel vaults, whose use was associated with the Hispano-Visigothic liturgy practised in Spain up to the 11th century.

One of the most particular elements of Santa Cristina de Lena is the existence of the presbytery elevated above floor level in the last section of the central nave, separated from the area intended for the congregation by three arches on marble columns. This separation, which appears in other Asturian churches, is not repeated in any other with a similar structure. Both the lattices over the arches and the wall enclosing the central arch were re-used from Visigothic origins in the 7th century.

== Gallery ==
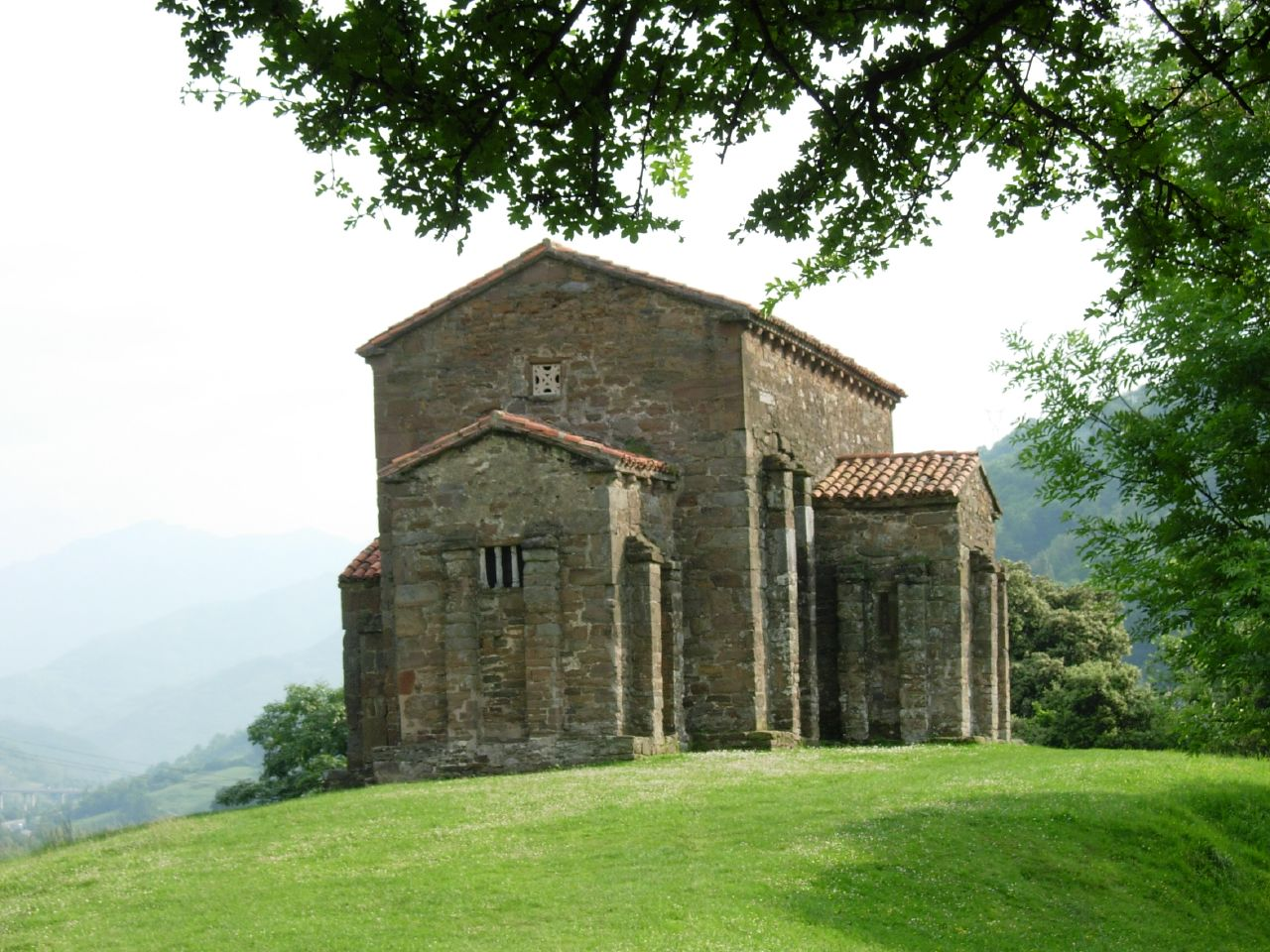
View from the outside

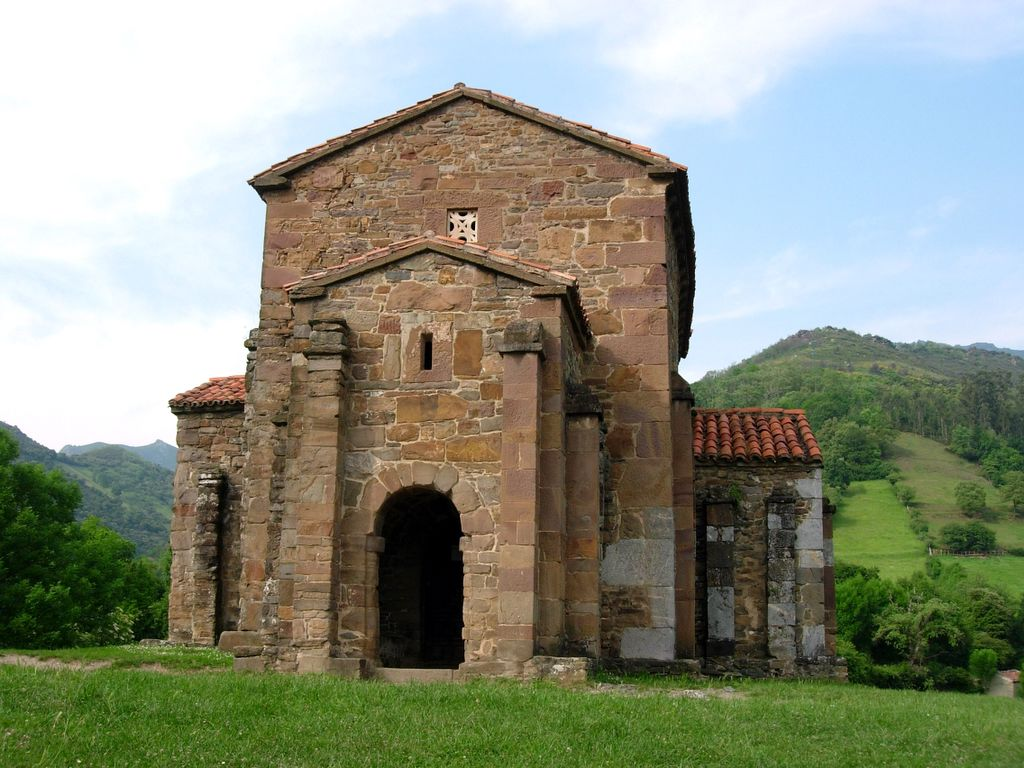
View from the outside

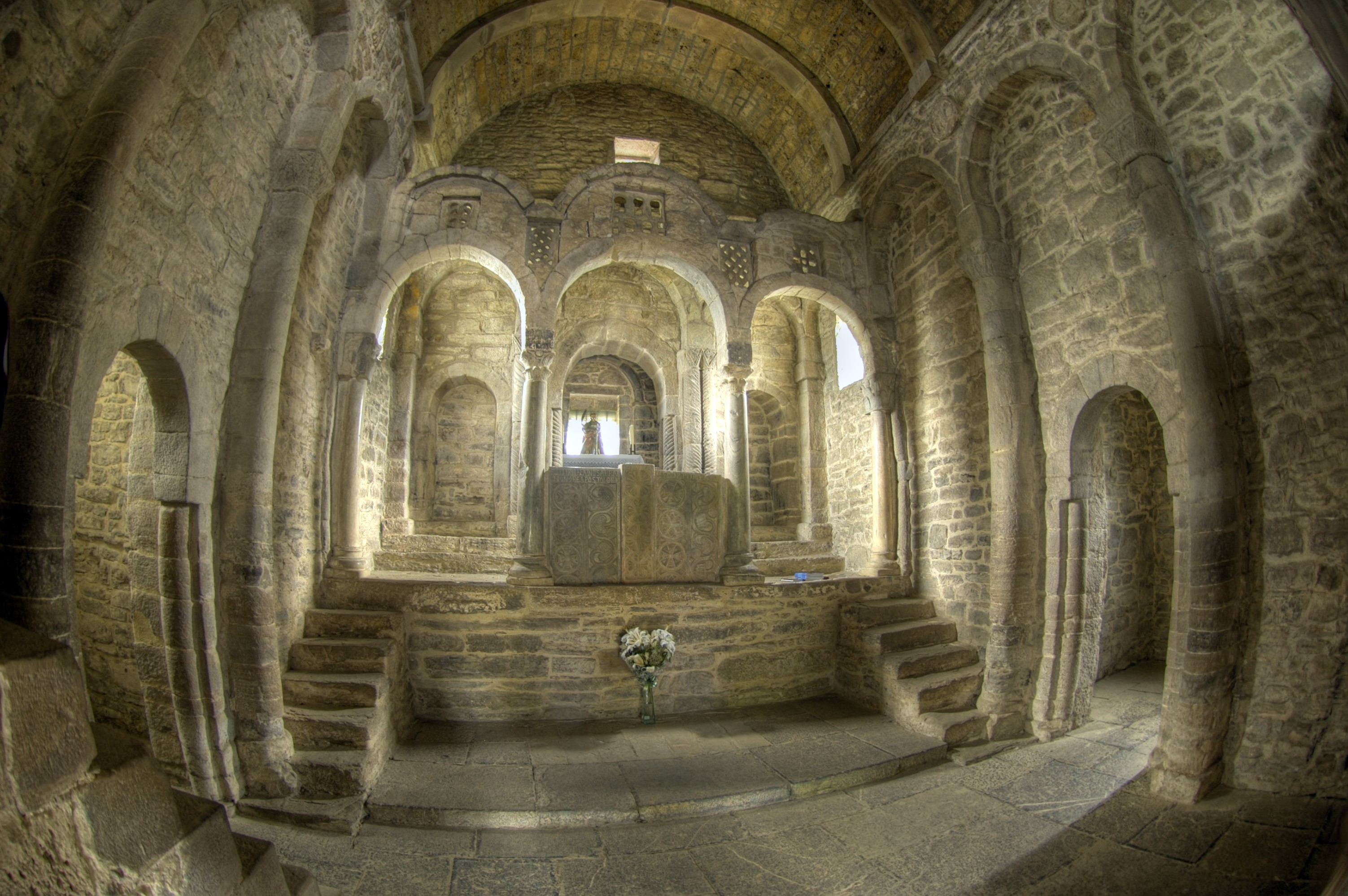
Nave and chapel

Floor map of the church

== See also ==
- Asturian art
- Catholic Church in Spain
