= Freixo =

Freixo is a surname. Notable people with the surname include:

- Gregório Freixo (born 1952), Portuguese footballer
- Marcelo Freixo (born 1967), Brazilian politician and teacher

== See also ==
- Palácio do Freixo
