= Tuíza =

Parish of Lena, Asturias, Spain

Coordinates: 43.02351°N 5.9052°W

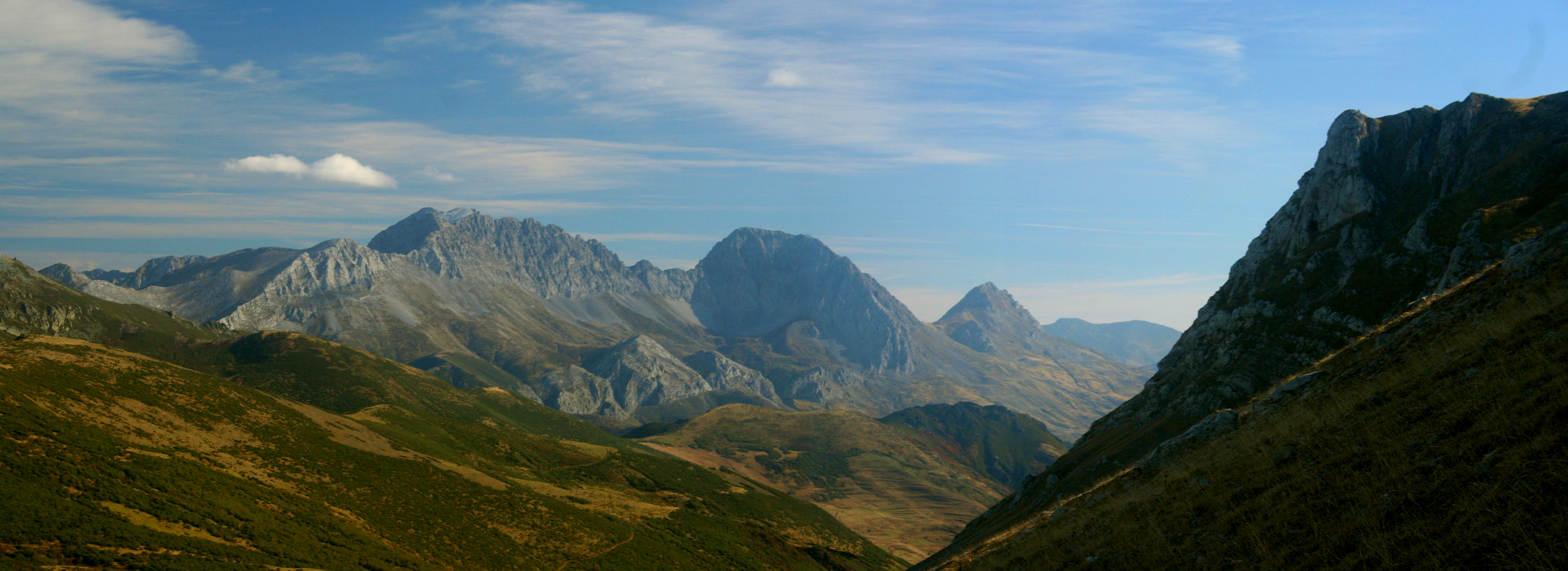
Ubiña Massif (Macizo de Ubiña)

Tuíza is one of 24 parishes (administrative divisions) in Lena, a municipality within the province and autonomous community of Asturias, in coastal northern Spain.

The parish is the home of the Ubiña Massif (Macizo de Ubiña) of the Cantabrian Mountains.

The parroquia is 23.32 km^{2} (9.00 sq mi) in size, with a highly seasonal population. Its post code is 33628.

== Villages ==
The villages of Tuíza include:

- Tuíza Baxo, located at an altitude of 1,050 meters
- Tuíza Riba, 1,300 meters high, the pass to the Ubiña Massif
- El Quempu, at 1,100 meters
