= Sotieḷḷo =

Parish in Asturias, Spain

Coordinates: 43.08795°N 5.82938°W

Sotieḷḷo is one of 24 parishes (administrative divisions) in Ḷḷena, a municipality within the province and autonomous community of Asturias, in coastal northern Spain.

The parroquia is 4.46 km^{2} (1.72 sq mi) in size, with a population of about 75.

== Towns ==
- Alceo
- San Bras
- Sotieḷḷo
