= Brownsville: Stories =

First edition

Brownsville: Stories is a short story collection by American author Oscar Casares. It was published in 2003 by Back Bay Books and was his first book. The title is taken from Casares’ hometown of Brownsville, Texas, where the loosely related stories in the book are set. Brownsville has been honored with several awards and, because of its literary style and structure, has earned comparisons to James Joyce's Dubliners.

== Contents ==
=== Chapter 1.I Thought You And Me Were Friends ===
- "Mr. Z."
- "RG"
- "Chango"

=== Chapter 2. They Say He Was Lost ===
- "Domingo"
- "Big Jesse, Little Jesse"
- "Charro"

=== Chapter 3. Don’t Believe Anything He Tells You ===
- "Jerry Fuentes"
- "Yolanda"
- "Mrs. Perez"

== Themes ==
Brownsville has been noted for its treatment of such themes as poverty, living with a disability, immigration, domestic violence, aging and mourning the death of a loved one.

== Awards ==
Brownsville was selected by the American Library Association as a Notable Book of 2004, and earned critical praise from such publications as The New York Times , The Washington Post, San Francisco Chronicle , and Entertainment Weekly .
