= Xomezana =

Parish of the municipality of Lena, in Asturias, Spain

Coordinates: 43.06316°N 5.84314°W

Xomezana is one of 24 parishes (administrative divisions) in Ḷḷena, a municipality within the province and autonomous community of Asturias, in coastal northern Spain.

The parroquia is 18.57 km^{2} (7.17 sq mi) in size, with a population of 132 in 2023.

The parish of Xomezana and the Güerna Valley received the Exemplary Town of Asturias Award in 1998.

== Villages ==
The villages of Xomezana include:

- Espineo
- Las Monas
- Xomezana Baxo
- Xomezana Riba
- Viḷḷarín
