= Lena, Asturias =

Lena Ḷḷena
- Municipality
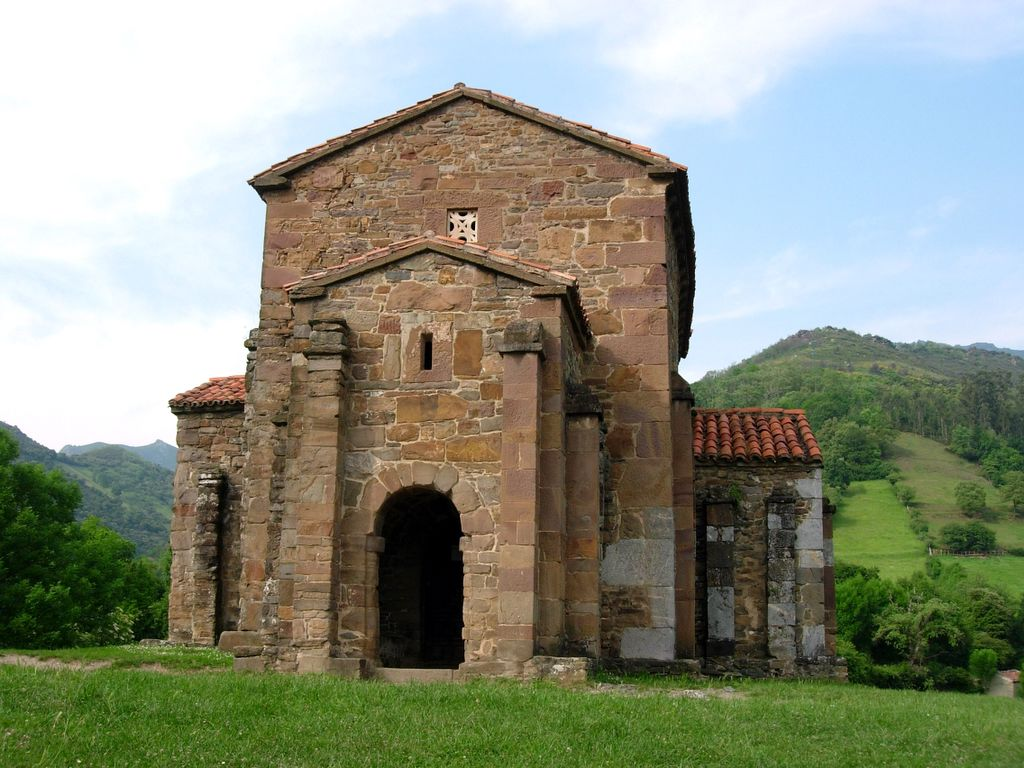
- Santa Cristina de Lena.

- Flag Coat of arms

- Location in Spain
- Coordinates: 43°9′30″N 5°49′45″W
- Country: Spain
- Autonomous community: Asturias
- Province: Asturias
- Comarca: Caudal

Area
  - Total: 315.51 km^{2} (121.82 sq mi)
- Highest elevation: 2,417 m (7,930 ft)

Population (2025-01-01)
  - Total: 10,382
  - Density: 32.905/km^{2} (85.225/sq mi)
- Demonym: Lenenses
- Time zone: UTC+1 (CET)
  - Summer (DST): UTC+2 (CEST)
- Postal code: 33620-33639
- Official language(s): Asturian

Lena (Asturian: Ḷḷena [ˈʈ͡ʂɛna]) is a municipality in the Autonomous Community of the Principality of Asturias, Spain. It has a population of 12.000 inhabitants, while 9,200 of them live in the capital, Pola de Lena.

== Parishes ==
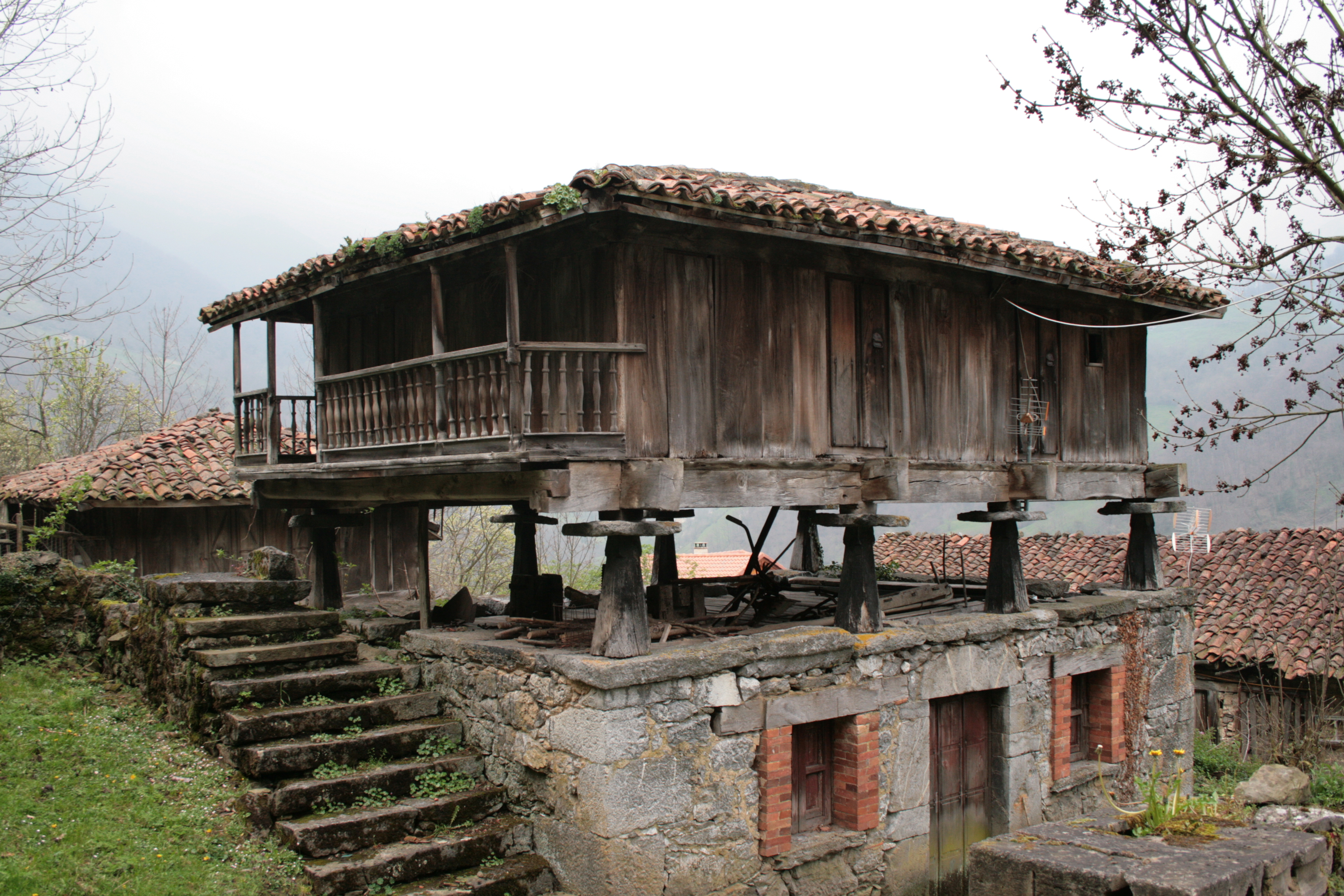
Hórreo in Lena

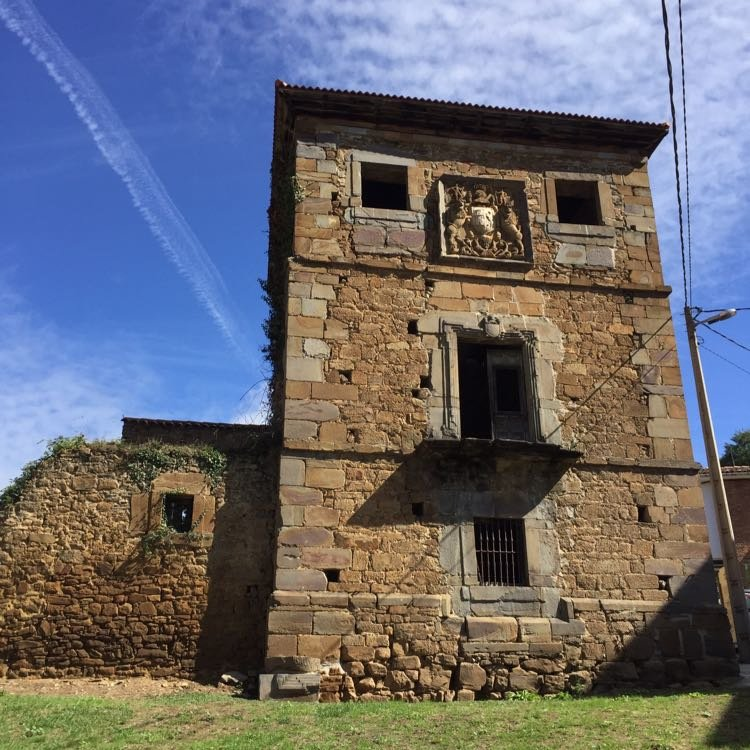
Faes-Miranda palace

- Cabezón
- Campomanes (Campumanes)
- Carabanzo
- Casorvida (Casorvía)
- Castiello (Castieḷḷo)
- Columbiello (Columbieḷḷo)
- Congostinas
- Felgueras
- Herías (Erías)
- Xomezana (Jomezana)
- Las Puentes
- Llanos (Chanos de Somerón)
- Muñón Cimero (Muñón Cimiru)
- Muñón Fondero (Muñón Fondiru)
- Pajares (Payares)
- Paraná
- Piñera
- Pola de Lena (La Pola)
- San Miguel del Río (Samiguel del Río)
- Sotiello (Sotieḷḷo)
- Telledo (Teyeo)
- Tuiza
- Villallana (Viḷḷayana)
- Zureda (Zurea)

== Main sights ==
- Pre-Romanesque church of Santa Cristina de Lena. In 1985 it was included in the UNESCO World Heritage List.
- Mosaic of Vega de Ciego, discovered in 1921. It was probably from a Roman villa, and is now in the Archaeological Museum of Asturias
- El Hospitalón (16th century)
- Baroque Palacio de Faes, at Carabanzo

== See also ==
- Sanctuary of the Virgen de Bendueños
- List of municipalities in Asturias
