= Ḷḷindes =

Administrative division of Quirós, Spain

Coordinates: 43.083333°N 5.9°W

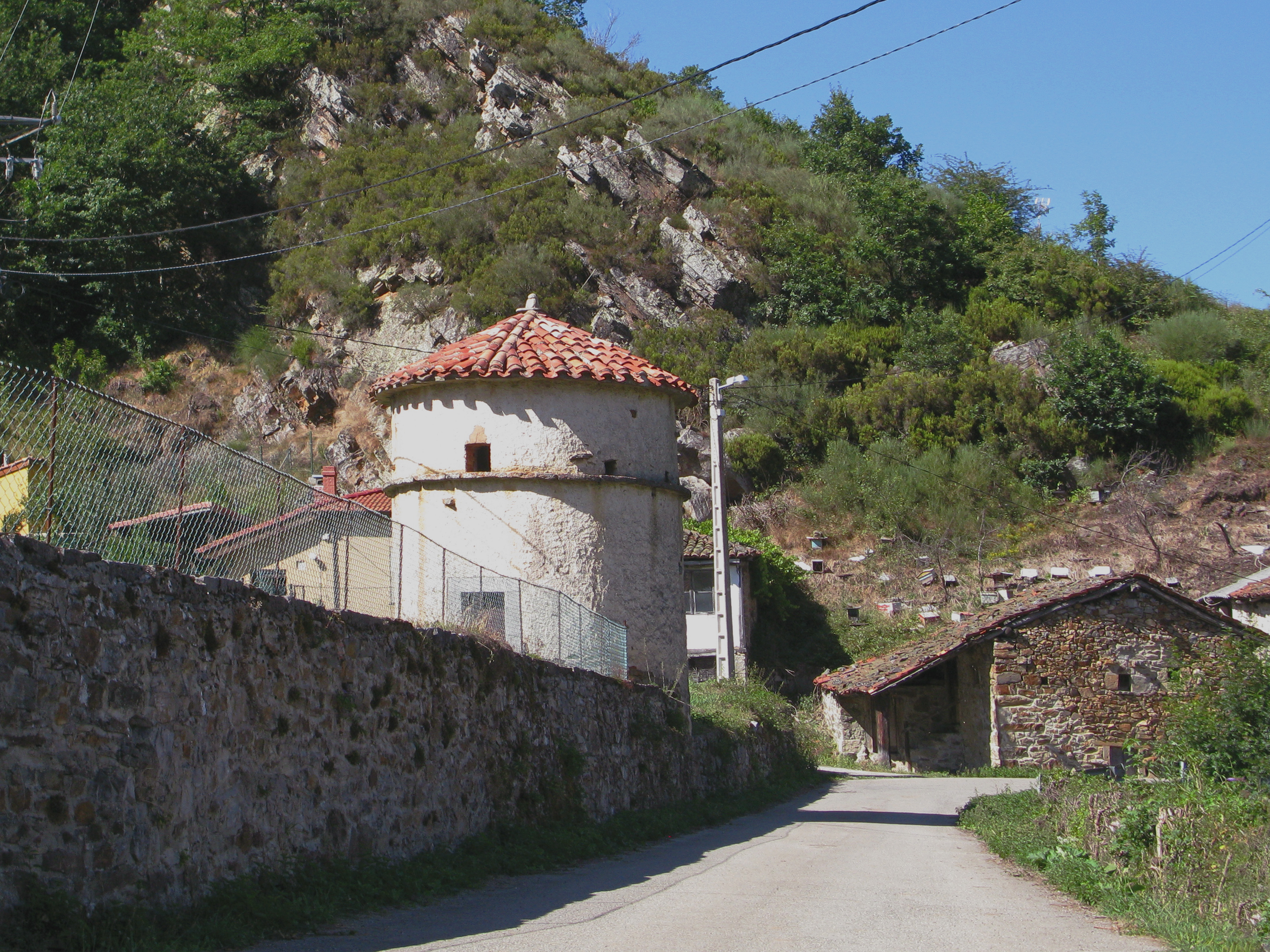
View of Ḷḷindes.

Ḷḷindes is one of thirteen parishes (administrative divisions) in Quirós, a municipality within the province and autonomous community of the Principality of Asturias, in northern Spain.

The population is 73.

== Villages ==
- El Corral
- Cortes
- El Toḷḷo
- Fresneo de Cortes
- Ḷḷindes
