= Oscar Cásares =

American writer (born 1964)

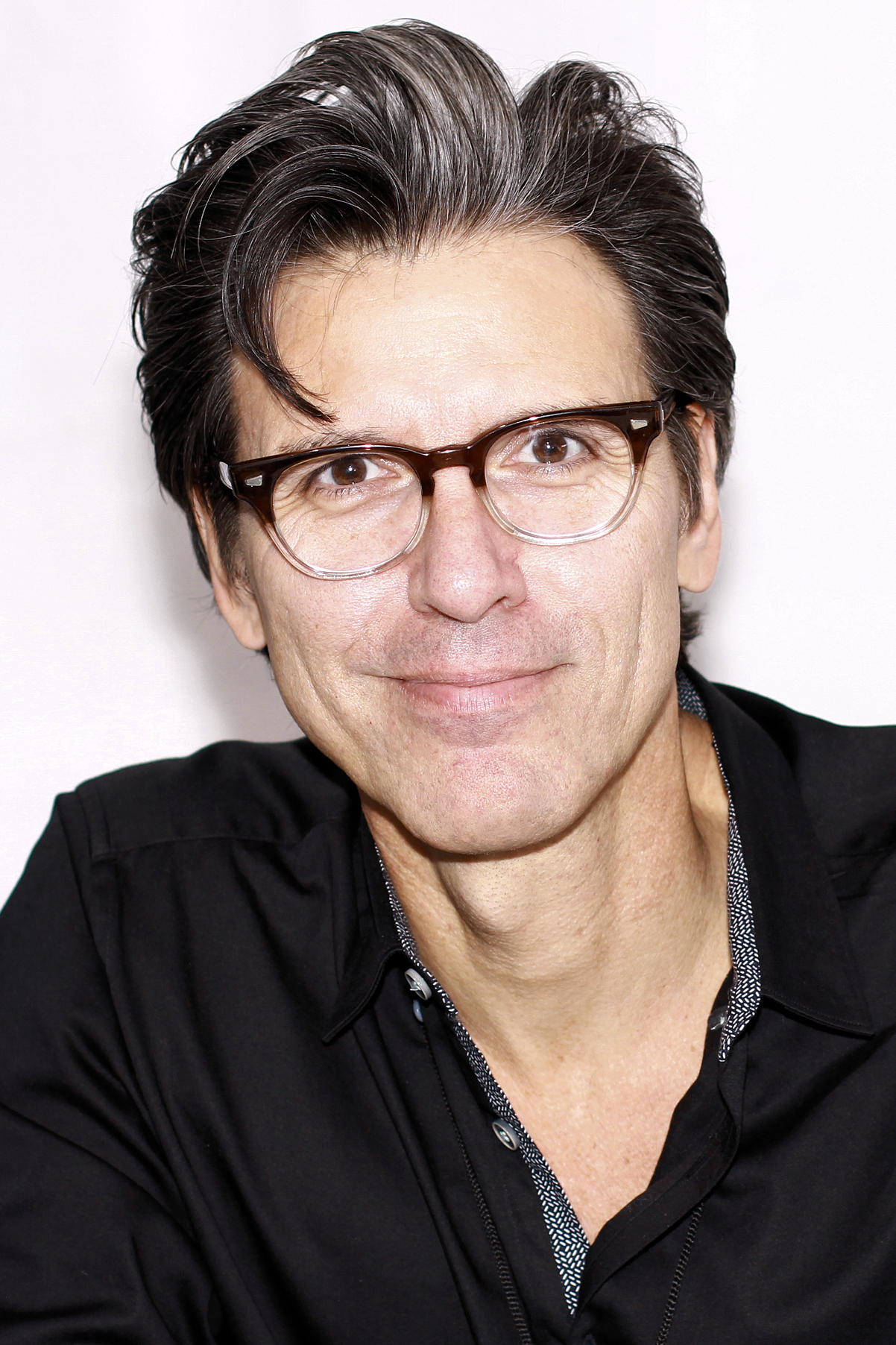
- Cásares at the 2019 Texas Book Festival
- Born: May 7, 1964 (age 62) Brownsville, Texas
- Occupation: Author, Professor of Creative Writing
- Language: English

Oscar Cásares (born May 7, 1964) is an American writer and associate professor of creative writing. He is the author of Brownsville: Stories, Amigoland, and Where We Come From. Cásares teaches at the University of Texas at Austin where he is director of the Creative Writing Program.

== Honors ==
- Guggenheim Fellowship (2020)
- National Endowment for the Arts Fellowship (2006)
- James A. Michener Award, Copernicus Society of America, Iowa Writers' Workshop (2002)
- Dobie Paisano Fellowship, Texas Institute of Letters, University of Texas (2002)

== Bibliography ==
=== Books ===
- Where We Come From (May 21, 2019) ISBN 978-0525655435
- Amigoland (August 10, 2009) ISBN 0316159697
- Brownsville: Stories (March 6, 2003) ISBN 0316146803

=== Selected Essays ===
- "Imaginary Friends," Texas Monthly, December 2010
- "The Departed," Texas Monthly, April 2010
- "You Must Read This: The Burning Plain," National Public Radio, October 2009
- "Grass Roots," Texas Monthly, December 2008
- "Ready for Some Futbol?", Texas Monthly, November 2006
- "In the Year 1974", Texas Monthly, March 2005
- "Crossing the Border Without Losing Your Past," New York Times, September 2003
