= Saint Eulália Church =

Saint Eulália Church or Igreja de Santa Eulália can mean:

- Saint Eulália Church (Tenões, Braga, Portugal)
- Igreja de Santa Eulália do Mosteiro de Arnoso
- Church of Santa Eulalia de Ujo
- Church of Santa Eulalia de la Lloraza
- Sant'Eulalia dei Catalani

== See also ==
- Barcelona Cathedral, also known as the Cathedral of Saint Eulália
