= Sietes =

Spanish footballer (born 1974)

Personal information
- Full name: José Manuel Suárez Rivas
- Date of birth: 18 February 1974 (age 52)
- Place of birth: Sietes, Spain
- Height: 1.77 m (5 ft 10 in)
- Position: Left-back

Youth career
- Lealtad
- Sporting Gijón
- Oviedo

Senior career*
Years	Team	Apps	(Gls)
1992–1994	Oviedo B	34	(1)
1994–1995	Oviedo	40	(2)
1995–1997	Valencia	29	(0)
1997–2003	Racing Santander	164	(0)
2003–2004	Alavés	12	(0)
2004–2005	Murcia	17	(0)
2005–2006	Watford	0	(0)
2006–2008	Numancia	35	(0)
2008–2011	Lealtad	67	(1)
2011–2012	Avilés	36	(1)
Total		434	(5)

International career
1994–1996	Spain U21	9	(0)
1996	Spain U23	1	(0)
2000–2002	Asturias	3	(0)
Medal record
Men's football
Representing Spain
UEFA European Under-21 Championship
Runner-up	1996 Spain
- * Club domestic league appearances and goals

José Manuel Suárez Rivas (born 18 February 1974), known as Sietes, is a Spanish former professional footballer who played as a left-back.

He appeared in 194 La Liga matches over ten seasons, mainly for Racing de Santander. He started his 19-year senior career with Real Oviedo.

== Club career ==
Sietes, who was born in Sietes, Asturias, receiving his nickname from his birthplace, started playing for local giants Real Oviedo, first appearing with the first team on 27 March 1994 in a 0–0 away draw against Real Valladolid. With just nine La Liga matches throughout the entire season, he did score his only two goals as a professional in back-to-back 3–0 wins over Athletic Bilbao and Atlético Madrid.

Signing with Valencia CF for the 1995–96 campaign, Sietes was used sparingly over two seasons – underperforming mainly due to homesickness– and moved to Racing de Santander for 1997–98, where he would constantly battle top-flight relegation (which would eventually befall in 2001, with the club returning the following season with 39 appearances from the player). His career was unassuming afterwards, with stints mainly in the Segunda División, punctuated by a season with Watford in the English Championship where he did not play one single minute due to transfer issues and injury problems.

After only five games for CD Numancia in the 2007–08 campaign, with the Soria team returning to the top division after a three-year absence, Sietes joined Tercera División side CD Lealtad in Villaviciosa, remaining there three seasons. On 31 August 2012, having helped Real Avilés Industrial CF, also in his native region, to promote to Segunda División B, the 38-year-old announced his retirement.

== International career ==
Sietes represented Spain at the 1996 Summer Olympics, appearing once for the quarter-finalists.

== Post-retirement ==
After retiring, Sietes was Avilés' general manager for a brief period of time. Also, he worked as mayor of Rales (a parish in Llanes, from 2007 to 2011), councilman in the Villaviciosa town hall (2011–12) and scout of RCD Mallorca.

Additionally, Sietes was involved in rural tourism.

== Honours ==
Numancia

- Segunda División: 2007–08

Spain U21

- UEFA European Under-21 Championship runner-up: 1996
