= List of shipwrecks in October 1834 =

The list of shipwrecks in October 1834 includes ships sunk, foundered, wrecked, grounded or otherwise lost during October 1834.

== 1 October ==
List of shipwrecks: 1 October 1834
| Ship | State | Description |
|---|---|---|
| Ardent | United Kingdom | The ship was driven ashore near Brösen, Prussia. She was on a voyage from Danzig to Liverpool, Lancashire. Ardent was refloated on 27 October and taken in to Danzig. |
| Independence | United Kingdom | The ship was wrecked on Cape Sable Island, Nova Scotia, British North America. All on board were rescued. She was on a voyage from Cork to Saint John, New Brunswick, British North America. |

== 2 October ==
List of shipwrecks: 2 October 1834
| Ship | State | Description |
|---|---|---|
| Rose | United Kingdom | The ship was driven ashore and wrecked at Grand Manan. Her crew were rescued. She was on a voyage from Greenock, Renfrewshire to Saint John, New Brunswick, British North America. |
| Russia | United Kingdom | The ship was stranded in the White Sea. |
| Solitaire | France | The ship was lost at Marie-Galante, Guadeloupe. |

== 3 October ==
List of shipwrecks: 3 October 1834
| Ship | State | Description |
|---|---|---|
| Mercury | United Kingdom | The barque departed from Calcutta, India for St. George's Sound. No further trace, presumed lost with all hands. |
| Oscar | Norway | The ship was driven ashore and wrecked at Honfleur, Calvados, France. |

== 4 October ==
List of shipwrecks: 4 October 1834
| Ship | State | Description |
|---|---|---|
| Commerce | United Kingdom | The ship was run down and sunk in the Swin Channel. Her crew were rescued. She was on a voyage from Berwick upon Tweed, Northumberland to London. |
| Quelle | Denmark | The ship departed from Stege for Plymouth, Devon, United Kingdom. No further trace, presumed foundered with the loss of all hands.< |

== 5 October ==
List of shipwrecks: 5 October 1834
| Ship | State | Description |
|---|---|---|
| William IV | United Kingdom | The ship was wrecked on the South American coast with the loss of three of her crew. She was bound for Valparaíso, Chile. |

== 6 October ==
List of shipwrecks: 6 October 1834
| Ship | State | Description |
|---|---|---|
| Kate | United Kingdom | The ship was driven ashore and wrecked at Port Elizabeth, Cape Colony. Her crew were rescued. |
| Swift | United Kingdom | The ship was wrecked off Villaviciosa, Asturias, Spain. Her crew were rescued. |

== 7 October ==
List of shipwrecks: 7 October 1834
| Ship | State | Description |
|---|---|---|
| George the Fourth | (United Kingdom of Great Britain and Ireland) Guernsey | The ship ran aground off Sanlúcar de Barrameda, Spain. She was refloated and consequently beached at Bonanza, Spain. George the Fourth was on a voyage from Guernsey to Seville, Spain. |
| Longport | United Kingdom | The ship sailed from the Elbe for Hull, Yorkshire. No further trace, presumed foundered in the North Sea with the loss of all hands. |
| Standard | United Kingdom | The ship foundered in the Gulf of Finland. She was on a voyage from London to Saint Petersburg, Russia. |

== 8 October ==
List of shipwrecks: 8 October 1834
| Ship | State | Description |
|---|---|---|
| Admiral Gifford | (United Kingdom of Great Britain and Ireland) New South Wales | The schooner was lost with the loss of twelve lives. |
| Cassandra | United Kingdom | The brig was in collision with the barque Thomas Harrison (United Kingdom) and sank in the English Channel off Plymouth, Devon. Her five crew were rescued by Thomas Harrison. Cassandra was on a voyage from Poole, Dorset to Liverpool, Lancashire. |

== 9 October ==
List of shipwrecks: 9 October 1834
| Ship | State | Description |
|---|---|---|
| Ariel | United Kingdom | The ship was driven ashore at Dragør, Denmark. She was on a voyage from Saint Petersburg, Russia to London. |
| Prescot | United Kingdom | The ship was driven ashore near Marstrand, Sweden. Her crew were rescued. She was on a voyage from Leith, Lothian to Saint Petersburg. |
| Vittoria | United Kingdom | The brig was wrecked at Flamborough Head, Yorkshire. Her crew were rescued. She was on a voyage from South Shields, County Durham to London. |

== 10 October ==
List of shipwrecks: 10 October 1834
| Ship | State | Description |
|---|---|---|
| Foinfontene | France | The ship was driven ashore on Terschelling, Friesland, Netherlands. Her crew were rescued. She was on a voyage from Havre de Grâce, Seine-Inférieure to Grimstad, Norway. |
| Johannes | Norway | The ship was lost west of Christiansand. Her crew were rescued. She was on a voyage from Saint-Valery-sur-Somme, Somme, France to Christiansand. |
| Merope | United Kingdom | The ship capsized and sank in Diamond Harbour, Quebec City, Lower Canada, British North America. She had been refloated by 11 November. |

== 12 October ==
List of shipwrecks: 12 October 1834
| Ship | State | Description |
|---|---|---|
| Henrietta | (United Kingdom of Great Britain and Ireland) British North America | The ship struck a rock and foundered 10 nautical miles (19 km) south of Cádiz, Spain. She was on a voyage from Newfoundland to Palermo, Spain. |

== 13 October ==
List of shipwrecks: 13 October 1834
| Ship | State | Description |
|---|---|---|
| Scotia | United Kingdom | The ship was wrecked near Porto, Portugal. Her crew were rescued. She was on a voyage from Newfoundland, British North America to Porto. |

== 14 October ==
List of shipwrecks: 14 October 1834
| Ship | State | Description |
|---|---|---|
| Brazen | United States | The ship was wrecked on the Isaac Shoal. She was on a voyage from Baltimore, Maryland to Jamaica. |
| Hope | United Kingdom | The ship was wrecked in a hurricane at Laguna, Texas, United States. |
| Joseph Ham | United States | The ship was abandoned in the Atlantic Ocean. She was on a voyage from Windsor, New Jersey to Boston, Massachusetts. Joseph Ham later came ashore at Brewster, Massachusetts. |
| Julia | United Kingdom | The ship was wrecked in a hurricane at Laguna. |
| Only Daughter | United States | The ship was wrecked in a hurricane at Laguna, Texas. |
| Preston | United Kingdom | The ship ran aground and was severely damaged at Memel, Prussia. She was on a voyage from Lancaster, Lancashire to Memel. |

== 15 October ==
List of shipwrecks: 15 October 1834
| Ship | State | Description |
|---|---|---|
| Elizabeth | United Kingdom | The ship foundered in the Irish Sea off Point Lynas, Anglesey. Her crew were rescued. She was on a voyage from Liverpool, Lancashire to Dublin. |
| Margaret | United Kingdom | The ship was wrecked near Carlingford, County Louth. |
| Telegraph | United Kingdom | The ship was driven ashore and wrecked on Islay, Inner Hebrides. |

== 16 October ==
List of shipwrecks: 16 October 1834
| Ship | State | Description |
|---|---|---|
| Ann | United Kingdom | The sloop was driven ashore near Ayr. She was on a voyage from the Shetland Islands to Belfast, County Antrim. |
| Johns | United Kingdom | The sloop was driven ashore at Ayr. She was on a voyage from Newry, County Antrim to Glasgow, Renfrewshire. |
| HMS Swallow | Royal Navy | The brig-sloop capsized in the Gulf of Mexico. She was righted and subsequently put into Havana, Cuba for repairs. |

== 17 October ==
List of shipwrecks: 17 October 1834
| Ship | State | Description |
|---|---|---|
| Agnes | United Kingdom | The schooner was driven ashore near Percé, Lower Canada, British North America. She was on a voyage from Demerara to Quebec City, Lower Canada. |
| Eliza | United Kingdom | The ship was driven ashore at Spurn Point, Yorkshire. She was on a voyage from Boston, Lincolnshire to Leeds, Yorkshire. |
| Enterprize | United Kingdom | The ship sank at Southwold, Suffolk. Her crew were rescued. |
| Esther | France | The ship sprang a leak off the Cape of Good Hope and was abandoned. She was on a voyage from Marseille, Bouches-du-Rhône to Mauritius. |
| Henrietta | France | The ship was driven ashore at "Bergen", North Holland, Netherlands. She was on a voyage from Caen, Calvados to Tønsberg, Norway |
| Mary | United Kingdom | The ship was wrecked on the Noordvaarder sandbank with the loss of all but one of her crew. She was on a voyage from Lowestoft, Suffolk to Medemblik, North Holland. |
| Molly | France | The ship was driven ashore on Vlieland, Friesland, Netherlands. Her crew were rescued. She was on a voyage from Caen to Arendal, Norway. |
| Neptune | United Kingdom | The ship was wrecked on the West Burrows Sandbank, in the North Sea off the coast of Essex. Her crew were rescued. She was on a voyage from London to Ipswich, Suffolk. |
| New Prospect | United Kingdom | The ship was driven ashore near the Leasowe Lighthouse, Cheshire. Her crew were rescued. She was on a voyage from Liverpool, Lancashire to Savannah, Georgia, United States. |
| Rebecca | United Kingdom | The ship was abandoned in the North Sea off Lowestoft, Suffolk. Her crew were rescued by two French fishing vessels. |

== 18 October ==
List of shipwrecks: 18 October 1834
| Ship | State | Description |
|---|---|---|
| Anna | United Kingdom | The ship was wrecked on Juist, Kingdom of Hanover. Her crew were rescued. She was on a voyage from London to Brevik, Norway. |
| Catherine | United Kingdom | The sloop was lost on the West Barrows Sandbank, in the North Sea off the coast of Essex. Her four crew were rescued by the steamship Yorkshireman. |
| Dorothea | Prussia | The ship was abandoned in the North Sea off Texel, North Holland, Netherlands. She was on a voyage from Saint-Servan, Ille-et-Vilaine, France to Memel. |
| Enigheden | Netherlands | The ship was driven ashore and wrecked at Petten, North Holland with the loss of all hands. She was on a voyage from Amsterdam, North Holland to St. Ubes, Spain. |
| Four Woodmen | United Kingdom | The ship was wrecked on the Banjaard Sand, in the North Sea off the coast of the Netherlands. Her crew were rescued. She was on a voyage from Newcastle upon Tyne, Northumberland to Dordrecht, South Holland, Netherlands |
| Guardian | United Kingdom | The ship was driven ashore at Katwijk, North Holland. Her crew were rescued. She was on a voyage from Sunderland, County Durham to Rotterdam, South Holland. |
| Good Will | United Kingdom | The ship was driven ashore at Zandvoort, North Holland. Her crew were rescued. She was on a voyage from Sunderland to Dordrecht. |
| Industrie | Norway | The ship was wrecked on Terschelling, Friesland, Netherlands with the loss of five of her crew. She was on a voyage from Caen, Calvados, France to Tønsberg. |
| Isabella | United Kingdom | The sloop was driven ashore 2 nautical miles (3.7 km) north of Hartlepool, County Durham with the loss of her captain. |
| Julia Amalia | Russia | The ship was wrecked on "Stoneskar" with the loss of her captain. She was on a voyage from Reval to Saint Petersburg. |
| Marguerite | United Kingdom | The ship was driven ashore on Long Island, New York, United States. She was on a voyage from Demerara to Quebec City, Lower Canada, British North America |
| Neva | United Kingdom | The ship was abandoned in the Atlantic Ocean. Her crew were rescued. She was on a voyage from London to Quebec City. |
| Ossian | United Kingdom | The ship was driven ashore at Montrose, Forfarshire. She was on a voyage from Liverpool, Lancashire to Hamburg. |
| Pandora | United Kingdom | The ship struck the Burbo Bank, in Liverpool Bay and was abandoned. She later came ashore. Pandora was on a voyage from Whitehaven, Cumberland to Dublin. |
| Rolla | United States | The ship was driven ashore at Zandvoort. Her crew were rescued. She was on a voyage from Baltimore, Maryland to Amsterdam. |
| Surinamsche Vriend | Netherlands | The ship was wrecked at Katwijk. She was on a voyage from Surinam to Amsterdam. |
| Susannah | France | The ship was driven ashore at Scheveningen, South Holland. She was on a voyage from Bordeaux, Gironde to Altona, Hamburg. |
| Susannah | United Kingdom | The schooner capsized and sank on the Kentish Knock, in the North Sea off the coast of Kent with the loss of three of her crew. Survivors were rescued by Canada (United Kingdom). Susannah was on a voyage from Great Yarmouth, Norfolk to Cardiff, Glamorgan. |

== 19 October ==
List of shipwrecks: 19 October 1834
| Ship | State | Description |
|---|---|---|
| Amelia | United Kingdom | The ship was driven ashore on Langeoog, Kingdom of Hanover. |
| Amity | United Kingdom | The ship was driven ashore at "Great Wrangle". She was on a voyage from Saint Petersburg, Russia to Glasgow, Renfrewshire. |
| Bergetha | Prussia | The ship was driven ashore at Thisted, Denmark. She was on a voyage from Bridgwater, Somerset, United Kingdom to Memel |
| Brisk | United Kingdom | The ship foundered off Padstow, Cornwall. |
| Ellida | Sweden | The ship was driven ashore and wrecked at "Great Wrangle". She was on a voyage from Saint Petersburg to Helsinki, Grand Duchy of Finland. |
| Folkfefester | Norway | The ship was driven ashore at Terschelling, Friesland, Netherlands. Her crew were rescued. She was on a voyage from Havre de Grâce, Seine-Inférieure, France to Grimstad. |
| Fortuna | France | The ship was wrecked at Wijk aan Zee, North Holland, Netherlands. Her crew were rescued. She was on a voyage from Bordeaux, Gironde to Saint Petersburg, Russia. |
| Frederick | Hamburg | The ship ran aground and sank at Danzig. She had been refloated by 22 October and taken in to Danzig. |
| Mary Ann | United Kingdom | The ship was driven ashore near Padstow, Cornwall. |
| Puget | United Kingdom | The ship was driven ashore and wrecked at "Great Wrangle". She was on a voyage from Saint Petersburg to Liverpool, Lancashire. |
| Saturn | Stettin | The ship was lost on the Oosterbank, in the North Sea. Her crew were rescued. She was on a voyage from Havre de Grâce, Seine-Inférieure to Stettin. |
| Spring | United States | The ship was lost on the Oosterbank with the loss of two of her crew and seven of her passengers. She was on a voyage from New York to Hamburg. |
| Urania | United Kingdom | The ship was driven ashore and wrecked at "Great Wrangle". She was on a voyage from Saint Petersburg to Greenock, Renfrewshire. |

== 20 October ==
List of shipwrecks: 20 October 1834
| Ship | State | Description |
|---|---|---|
| Anna Katharina | Sweden | The ship was driven ashore and wrecked at Den Helder, North Holland, Netherlands with the loss of all but one of her crew. She was on a voyage from St. Ubes, Spain to Stockholm. |
| Cornwall | United Kingdom | The ship was wrecked on "Dear Island". |
| Marco Bozzaris | Netherlands | The ship was driven ashore on the "Trindael". She was on a voyage from Batavia, Netherlands East Indies to Amsterdam, North Holland. |
| San Antonio | Uruguay | The ship was wrecked on the Isla da Flores. She was on a voyage from Montevideo to Pernambuco, Brazil |

== 21 October ==
List of shipwrecks: 21 October 1834
| Ship | State | Description |
|---|---|---|
| Annabella | United Kingdom | The ship capsized at Jersey, Channel Islands. |
| Ann Gales | United Kingdom | The ship was wrecked on Texel, North Holland, Netherlands. All on board were rescued. She was on a voyage from London to Saint Petersburg, Russia. |
| Cumberland | United Kingdom | The ship capsized in the River Tyne. She was later refloated. |
| Dahlia | United Kingdom | The ship was driven ashore at Egmond aan Zee, North Holland, Netherlands. Her crew were rescued. She was on a voyage from Rio de Janeiro, Brazil to Hamburg. |
| Good Intent | United Kingdom | The ship ran aground, caught fire and sank at Whitby, Yorkshire. |
| Ferinham | United Kingdom | The brig was driven ashore and wrecked at Troon, Ayrshire. Her crew survived. She was on a voyage from Greenock, Renfrewshire to Dublin. |
| Groningen Welwart | Netherlands | The ship was driven ashore near "Potten". She was on a voyage from Liverpool, Lancashire, United Kingdom to Harlingen, Friesland. |
| Haabets Anker | Norway | The ship was driven ashore on the "Zindwale". She was on a voyage from Drammen to Amsterdam, North Holland. |
| Henry | United Kingdom | The sloop sank Whitby. |
| Hope | United Kingdom | The ship struck rocks in Hoy Sound and was wrecked. Her crew were rescued. She was on a voyage from Saint Petersburg, Russia to Belfast, County Antrim. |
| Mary Ann | United Kingdom | The ship was driven ashore and wrecked at Staithes, Yorkshire. All on board were rescued. She was on a voyage from Whitby to Newcastle upon Tyne, Northumberland. |
| Mercury | United Kingdom | The ship was driven ashore on the coast of Manche, France, opposite Jersey, Channel Islands. She was on a voyage from Glasgow, Renfrewshire to Bridport, Dorset. |
| Monnikendam | Netherlands | The ship was driven ashore at Borkum, Kingdom of Hanover. She was on a voyage from Rio de Janeiro, Brazil to Amsterdam, North Holland Monnikendam was refloated on 2 November and taken in to Delfzijl, North Holland. |
| Perseverance | United Kingdom | The ship was driven ashore at Wijk aan Zee, North Holland. She was on a voyage from Saint Petersburg, Russia to Chepstow, Monmouthshire. |
| Robert Gordon | United Kingdom | The ship was wrecked on the Herd Sand, in the North Sea off the coast of County Durham. Her crew were rescued by the lifeboat Northumberland (United Kingdom). Robert Gordon was on a voyage from Sunderland, County Durham to Aberdeen. |
| Tasmania | United Kingdom | The ship was driven ashore at Callantsoog, North Holland with the loss of her captain. She was on a voyage from Saint Petersburg to London. |
| Vrow Frintze | Netherlands | The ship was driven ashore on the coast of Finland and abandoned. She was on a voyage from Saint Petersburg to Amsterdam. |
| William | United Kingdom | The schooner was driven ashore and wrecked at Whitehaven, Cumberland. Her crew were rescued. She was on a voyage from Harrington, Cumberland to Carrickfergus, County Down. |
| William Scott | (United Kingdom of Great Britain and Ireland) Isle of Man | The smack foundered in the Irish Sea off Whitehaven with the loss of all eight people on board. She was on a voyage from Carlisle, Cumberland to the Isle of Man. |

== 22 October ==
List of shipwrecks: 22 October 1834
| Ship | State | Description |
|---|---|---|
| Alexis | United Kingdom | The ship departed from South Shields, County Durham for London. No further trace, presumed foundered in the North Sea with the loss of all hands. |
| Ann | United Kingdom | The ship foundered in The Wash off King's Lynn, Norfolk. Her crew were rescued. |
| Antelope | United Kingdom | The ship departed from South Shields for London. No further trace, presumed foundered in the North Sea with the loss of all hands. |
| Bess or Betsey | United Kingdom | The ship was driven ashore at Spurn Point, Yorkshire. |
| Die Ostsie | Danzig | The ship foundered in the North Sea. Her crew were rescued by Milton (United Kingdom). Die Ostsie was on a voyage from Danzig to Brest, Finistère, France. |
| Ellen | United Kingdom | The ship was wrecked at Mockbeggar, Cheshire. She was on a voyage from Newcastle upon Tyne, Northumberland to Liverpool, Lancashire. |
| Gosforth | United Kingdom | The ship departed from South Shields for London. No further trace, presumed foundered in the North Sea with the loss of all hands. |
| Hawk | United Kingdom | The ship was driven ashore at Spurn Point. |
| Jean | United Kingdom | The ship was wrecked at Mockbeggar with the loss of two of her crew. She was on a voyage from Belfast, County Antrim to Liverpool. |
| Jean | United Kingdom | The ship was driven ashore and wrecked at Peterhead, Aberdeenshire. Her crew were rescued. She was on a voyage from Dunbar, Lothian to Fraserburgh, Aberdeenshire. |
| Lanson Castle | United Kingdom | The ship was driven ashore and severely damageded at Bude, Cornwall. |
| Mary | United Kingdom | The ship was wrecked at Holyhead, Anglesey. Her crew were rescued by the Holyhead Lifeboat. She was on a voyage from Wicklow to Liverpool. |
| Providence | United Kingdom | The ship was driven ashore at Spurn Point. |
| Sir William Wallace | United Kingdom | The brig was driven ashore and wrecked on the Isle of Lewis, Outer Hebrides. Her crew were rescued. She was on a voyage from Quebec City, Lower Canada, British North America to Stornoway, Isle of Lewis. |
| Thomas | United Kingdom | The ship was driven ashore at Cardigan. She was refloated on 30 October and taken in to port. |

== 23 October ==
List of shipwrecks: 23 October 1834
| Ship | State | Description |
|---|---|---|
| Francesca | Netherlands | The brig took a pilot on board off Den Helder, North Holland. She subsequently foundered with the loss of all on board. Francesca was on a voyage from Constantinople, Ottoman Empire to Amsterdam, North Holland. |
| Gipsey | United Kingdom | The ship in collision with a Prussian vessel off Bornholm, Denmark. She was abandoned the next day. Her crew were rescued by Diligence (United Kingdom). She was on a voyage from Saint Petersburg, Russia to Belfast, County Antrim. |
| Helen | United Kingdom | The ship was driven ashore and wrecked near the Leasowe Lighthouse, Cheshire. Her crew were rescued. She was on a voyage from Newcastle upon Tyne, Northumberland to Liverpool, Lancashire. |
| Henrietta Magdalina | Duchy of Holstein | The ship was driven ashore near "Furnes". Her crew were rescued. She was on a voyage from Neustadt in Holstein to Gloucester, United Kingdom. |
| Hercules | United Kingdom | The ship was wrecked on the Herd Sand, in the North Sea off County Durham. Her crew were rescued. |
| Sacra Famiglia | Grand Duchy of Tuscany | The ship was driven ashore at "Muaszacca". |
| Swift | United Kingdom | The ship was wrecked near Southport, Lancashire with the loss of all hands. She was on a voyage from Portrush, County Antrim to Liverpool, Lancashire. |

== 24 October ==
List of shipwrecks: 24 October 1834
| Ship | State | Description |
|---|---|---|
| Aid | United Kingdom | The ship was wrecked 8 nautical miles (15 km) south of Bridlington, Yorkshire with the loss of all hands. She was on a voyage from Newcastle upon Tyne, Northumberland to Cromarty. |
| Auguste | Prussia | The ship was driven ashore and wrecked on Ameland, Friesland, Netherlands. Her crew were rescued. |
| Betsey | United Kingdom | The brig was driven ashore and wrecked at Huttoft, Lincolnshire with the loss of all but one of her four crew. She was on a voyage from King's Lynn, Norfolk to Leith, Lothian. |
| Eagle | United Kingdom | The ship was driven ashore 6 nautical miles (11 km) south of Bridlington. Her crew were rescued. Eagle was refloated in mid-November and taken in to Bridlington. |
| Eleaser | Norway | The ship was driven ashore at Ter Heijde, South Holland, Netherlands. Her crew were rescued. |
| Fen Soskende | Denmark | The ship was wrecked on Ameland with the loss of all but three of her crew. She was on a voyage from a Danish port to London, United Kingdom. |
| Florent | France | The ship was driven ashore near Domburg, Zeeland, Netherlands. She was on a voyage from Saint Petersburg, Russia to Havre de Grâce, Seine-Inférieure. |
| Hazard | United Kingdom | The schooner was driven ashore and wrecked on Lindisfarne. Her crew were rescued by the Lindisfarne Lifeboat. She was on a voyage from Sunderland, County Durham to Aberdeen. |
| Heroine | United States | The ship was lost off Hook of Holland, South Holland with the loss of all but two of her crew. She was on a voyage from New York to Rotterdam, South Holland. |
| Jonge Heinrick | Netherlands | The ship was wrecked at Noordwijk, South Holland. She was on a voyage from Caen, Calvados, France to Amsterdam, North Holland. |
| Neptunus | Belgium | The ship was driven ashore at Den Helder, North Holland. Her crew were rescued. She was on a voyage from Riga, Russia to Antwerp. |
| Pomona | United Kingdom | The schooner was driven ashore at Hook of Holland. Her crew were rescued. She was on a voyage from the Firth of Forth to Dordrecht, South Holland. |
| Resolution | United Kingdom | The ship was driven ashore near Waterford. |
| Resolution | United Kingdom | The sloop was driven ashore near Wainfleet, Lincolnshire. Her three crew were rescued by the Skegness Lifeboat. She was on a voyage from South Shields, County Durham to Wells-next-the-Sea, Norfolk. |
| Shamrock | United Kingdom | The ship was driven ashore at Grimsby, Lincolnshire. She was on a voyage from Hull, Yorkshire to Berwick upon Tweed, Northumberland. |
| Spring | United Kingdom | The ship foundered in the North Sea off Orford Ness, Suffolk with the loss of all but one of her crew. The survivor was rescued by Mary (United Kingdom). Spring was on a voyage from Sunderland, County Durham to London. |
| William Scott | United Kingdom | The Smack foundered in the Irish Sea off Whitehaven, Cumberland with the loss of all hands. She was on a voyage from Whitehaven to the Isle of Man. |

== 25 October ==
List of shipwrecks: 25 October 1834
| Ship | State | Description |
|---|---|---|
| Albertus | Prussia | The ship was wrecked near Calais, France, with the loss of all but one of her crew. She was on a voyage from St. Ubes, Spain to Barth. |
| Clara | Greifswald | The ship was abandoned in the North Sea off Texel, North Holland, Netherlands. Her crew were rescued by Belvidere (United Kingdom). Clara was on a voyage from Greifswald to Schiedam, South Holland. |
| Emile | France | The ship was wrecked on Borkum, Kingdom of Hanover. She was on a voyage from Saint Petersburg, Russia to Boulogne, Pas-de-Calais. |
| Fortunate | United Kingdom | The ship sprang a leak and foundered off the Corsewall Lighthouse, Wigtownshire. Her crew were rescued. She was on a voyage from Glasgow, Renfrewshire to Rouen, Seine-Inférieure, France. |
| Hawk | United Kingdom | The ship foundered in the North Sea 30 nautical miles (56 km) north north west of Ostend, West Flanders, Belgium with the loss of four of her seven crew. She was on a voyage from Newcastle upon Tyne, Northumberland to Porto, Portugal. |
| Hannibal | United Kingdom | The ship foundered in the North Sea off Texel. Her crew were rescued by Charlotte (United Kingdom). Hannibal was on a voyage from Danzig to London. |
| Hercules | Sweden | The ship was wrecked at Petten, North Holland. Her crew were rescued. She was on a voyage from Lisbon, Portugal to Gothenburg. |
| John | United Kingdom | The ship was driven ashore at Hartlepool, County Durham. |
| Malta | United Kingdom | The ship was wrecked near Calais. Her crew were rescued. She was on the voyage from Sunderland, County Durham to Shoreham-by-Sea, Sussex. |
| Maria Sophia | Sweden | The ship foundered in the North Sea off Dunkirk, Nord, France with the loss of three of her crew. She was on a voyage from St. Ubes, Spain to Trondheim. |
| Providence | United Kingdom | The ship was driven ashore and wrecked 1 nautical mile (1.9 km) west of Nieuwpoort, West Flanders with the loss of three of the six people on board. She was on a voyage from Stockton-on-Tees, County Durham to Weymouth, Dorset. |
| Success | United Kingdom | The brig was abandoned in the English Channel 25 nautical miles (46 km) off North Foreland, Kent. Her crew were rescued by Integrity (United Kingdom). |
| Union | Sweden | The ship was driven ashore 4 nautical miles (7.4 km) west of Ostend with the loss of her captain. She was on a voyage from St. Ubes to Stockholm. |

== 26 October ==
List of shipwrecks: 26 October 1834
| Ship | State | Description |
|---|---|---|
| Cousins | United Kingdom | The ship was driven ashore and wrecked at "Green Pond". She was on a voyage from Labrador, British North America to Saint John, New Brunswick, British North America. |
| Elizabeth and Mary | United Kingdom | The ship ran aground on the Seven Stones Reef and was consequently beached at Old Grimsby, Tresco, Isles of Scilly. She was on a voyage from Great Yarmouth, Norfolk to Bristol, Gloucestershire. |
| Liverpool | United Kingdom | The ship ran aground in the Brunswick Dock, Liverpool, Lancashire and broke her back. |
| Mary Ann | United Kingdom | The ship was run down and sunk in the River Thames by Eliza Jane (United Kingdom). Mary Ann was on a voyage from Gainsborough, Lincolnshire to London. |

== 27 October ==
List of shipwrecks: 27 October 1834
| Ship | State | Description |
|---|---|---|
| Allegro | United Kingdom | The ship was wrecked near Barrington, Nova Scotia, British North America. She was on a voyage from Demerara to Saint John, New Brunswick, British North America. |
| Champion | United Kingdom | The smack was wrecked on the Gunfleet Sand, in the North Sea off the coast of Essex. Her crew were rescued. She was on a voyage from Aberdeen to London. |
| Dorothea | Courland Governorate | The ship was lost in the Vlie with the loss of her captain. She was on a voyage from Libava to Lisbon, Portugal. |
| Gratierne | France | The ship was driven ashore at Waarde, Zeeland, Netherlands. Her crew were rescued. She was on a voyage from Fredrikstad, Denmark to Dieppe, Seine-Inférieure. |
| Jonge Frederick | Prussia | The ship capsized and was driven ashore at Scheveningen, South Holland, Netherlands. She was on a voyage from Danzig to Bordeaux, Gironde, France. |
| Juno | Lübeck | The ship was wrecked on Eierland, North Holland. She was on a voyage from Lübeck to Bordeaux, Gironde, France. |

== 28 October ==
List of shipwrecks: 28 October 1834
| Ship | State | Description |
|---|---|---|
| Apollo | Stettin | The ship was driven ashore at Hel, Prussia. She was on a voyage from Riga, Russia to Stettin. |
| Cherub | United Kingdom | The ship departed from Whitehaven, Cumberland for Dublin. Presumed subsequently foundered with the loss of all hands. |
| Henry and Caroline | United Kingdom | The ship was destroyed by fire off Steven's Head. Her crew were rescued by the brig Stowe (Russia). Henry and Caroline was on a voyage from Saint Petersburg, Russia to London. |
| L'Oreste | French Navy | The Brig-of-War foundered in the Bay of Biscay between Bilbao and San Sebastián, Spain with the loss of 28 of her crew. |
| Malaga | flag unknown | The ship was driven ashore at "Worlsdorf". |
| Navarino | United Kingdom | The ship was driven ashore and wrecked on Alderney, Channel Islands. Her crew were rescuied. She was on a voyage from London to Odesa. |
| Swain | United Kingdom | The ship was driven ashore on Juist, Kingdom of Hanover. She was on a voyage from Christiania, Norway to Antwerp, Belgium. |

== 29 October ==
List of shipwrecks: 29 October 1834
| Ship | State | Description |
|---|---|---|
| Planter | United Kingdom | The ship was driven ashore at Ventava, Courland Governorate. She was on a voyage from Riga, Russia to Belfast, County Antrim. |

== 30 October ==
List of shipwrecks: 30 October 1834
| Ship | State | Description |
|---|---|---|
| Crisis | United Kingdom | The ship was sighted in the Skagerrak. No further trace, presumed subsequently foundered with the loss of all hands. She was on a voyage from Saint Petersburg, Russia to London. |
| Lark | United Kingdom | The ship foundered in the Bristol Channel off Minehead, Somerset. with the loss of all hands. |
| Sally | United Kingdom | The brig sprang a leak and was beached in Glenluce Bay. She was on a voyage from Troon, Ayrshire to Belfast, County Antrim. |
| St. Andrew | United Kingdom | The ship was run down and sunk in the River Thames by Ann (United Kingdom). St. Andrew was on a voyage from Berwick upon Tweed, Northumberland to London. |

== 31 October ==
List of shipwrecks: 31 October 1834
| Ship | State | Description |
|---|---|---|
| Amici | United Kingdom | The ship was wrecked on Norderney, Kingdom of Hanover. Her crew were rescued. She was on a voyage from Hull, Yorkshire to Hamburg. |
| Donegal | United Kingdom | The brig was driven ashore and wrecked near Greencastle, County Donegal. She was on a voyage from Londonderry to Liverpool, Lancashire. |
| John | United Kingdom | The schooner capsized in the River Severn. She was later righted and taken into Newport, Monmouthshire. |
| Peggy | United Kingdom | The ship capsized and sank in a squall at Seaham, County Durham. |

== Unknown date ==
List of shipwrecks: Unknown date 1834
| Ship | State | Description |
|---|---|---|
| Adelgunde | Duchy of Oldenburg | The ship foundered in the North Sea off Cuxhaven on or before 20 October. She was on a voyage from Rouen, Seine-Inférieure, France to Elsfleth. |
| Albertus | flag unknown | The ship was driven ashore and wrecked near Calais, France. |
| Ariadne | United Kingdom | The brig was driven ashore at Danzig. |
| Aurora | United Kingdom | The ship was wrecked at Syros, Greece before 24 October. |
| Australian | (United Kingdom of Great Britain and Ireland) New South Wales | The whaler was wrecked at "Brune Island". |
| Ceres | United Kingdom | The ship foundered in the North Sea (57°N 07°E) on or before 20 October. |
| Charlotte | (Russian Empire) Grand Duchy of Finland | The ship was abandoned in the North Sea. Her crew were rescued. She was on a voyage from Jakobstad to Livorno, Grand Duchy of Tuscany. |
| Cleopatra | United Kingdom | The ship was wrecked at Algeciras, Spain between 27 and 30 October. |
| Duke of Clarence | United Kingdom | The ship was driven ashore and wrecked at Danzig before 21 October. |
| Economy | United Kingdom | The ship was wrecked at Saint-Valery-sur-Somme, Somme, France. |
| Emelie | flag unknown | The ship ran aground on the North Rassen Bank, in the North Sea, and was abandoned. She was on a voyage from Newcastle upon Tyne to Philadelphia, Pennsylvania, United States. |
| Emulous | United Kingdom | The sloop foundered in the Irish Sea with the loss of all hands. She was on a voyage from Whitehaven, Cumberland to Ramsey, Isle of Man. |
| Gabriel | France | The brig was driven ashore and wrecked on the Spanish coast near Gibraltar between 27 and 30 October. |
| Gough | United Kingdom | The ship was driven ashore near Grimsby, Lincolnshire. |
| Gustav | Sweden | The ship was driven ashore and wrecked near Calais. She was on a voyage from St. Ubes, Spain to Stockholm. |
| Harmonie | France | The ship was wrecked at Coringa, India before 23 October. Her crew were rescued. She was on a voyage from the Île Bourbon to Pondicherry, India. |
| Helvetius | United States | The ship was wrecked at Honolulu, Hawaii. |
| James | United Kingdom | The ship was wrecked on Bornholm, Denmark. She was on a voyage from London to Saint Petersburg, Russia. |
| James and Isabella | United States | The brig was driven ashore and wrecked on the Spanish cooast near Gibraltar between 27 and 30 October. |
| Jonge Johan | Netherlands | The ship was wrecked on the west coast of Texel. Her crew were rescued. |
| Kate | (United Kingdom of Great Britain and Ireland) Cape Colony | The schooner was driven ashore in Algoa Bay before 9 October. |
| Liffey | United Kingdom | The ship was driven ashore at Gibraltar between 27 and 30 October. |
| Louise | Sweden | The ship was driven ashore and wrecked at Katwijk, North Holland with the loss of all hands before 27 October. She was on a voyage from Rio de Janeiro, Brazil to Stockholm. |
| Malta | United Kingdom | The ship was driven ashore near Calais. Her crew were rescued. She was on a voyage from Sunderland, County Durham to Shoreham-by-Sea, Sussex. |
| Marie Sophie | France | The ship was driven ashore and wrecked near Calais with the loss of three of her crew. She was on a voyage from Sète, Hérault to Copenhagen, Denmark. |
| Oberon | Stettin | The ship was wrecked on the west coast of Texel. She was on a voyage from Stettin to Lisbon, Portugal. |
| Othsee | Danzig | The ship was abandoned in the North Sea 40 nautical miles (74 km) east of the Dogger Bank. She was on a voyage from Danzig to Brest, Finistère, Ferance. |
| Pauline Sophie Wunderlick | Netherlands | The ship foundered whilst on a voyage from Amsterdam to Larvik, Norway. |
| Phœnix | France | The ship was wrecked on the west coast of Texel with the loss of all but three of her crew. She was on a voyage from Stettin to Havre de Grâce, Seine-Inférieure. |
| Shannon | (United Kingdom of Great Britain and Ireland) New South Wales | The two-masted schooner was lost on a voyage from Port Arthur to Hobart, Van Diemen's Land. |
| Sieben Bruder | Lübeck | The ship was wrecked near Emdben, Kingdom of Hanover with the loss of all hands. She was on a voyage from Glasgow, Renfrewshire, United Kingdom to Lübeck. |
| Snaresbrook | United Kingdom | The ship foundered in the North Sea off Ameland, Friesland, Netherlands. Her crew were rescued. She was on a voyage from Hamburg to London. |
| Southworth | United Kingdom | The ship foundered in the North Sea off the Dutch coast with the loss of all hands. |
| Standard | United Kingdom | The ship was driven ashore on Texel. Her crew were rescued. She was on a voyage from London to Stockholm, Sweden. |
| Superb | United Kingdom | The steamship was presumed to have foundered in the North Sea off Büsum, Duchy of Holstein on or about 23 October with the loss of all hands. |
| Thomas and Edward | United States | The schooner capsized and sank off Tilghman Island, Maryland with the loss of seven lives. She was on a voyage from ão Miguel, Azores, Portugal to Baltimore, Maryland. |
| X. L. | United Kingdom | The ship was wrecked near Westkapelle, Zeeland, Netherlands. She was on a voyage from Sunderland to Schiedam, South Holland, Netherlands. |
