= Iglesia de San Andrés (Bedriñana) =

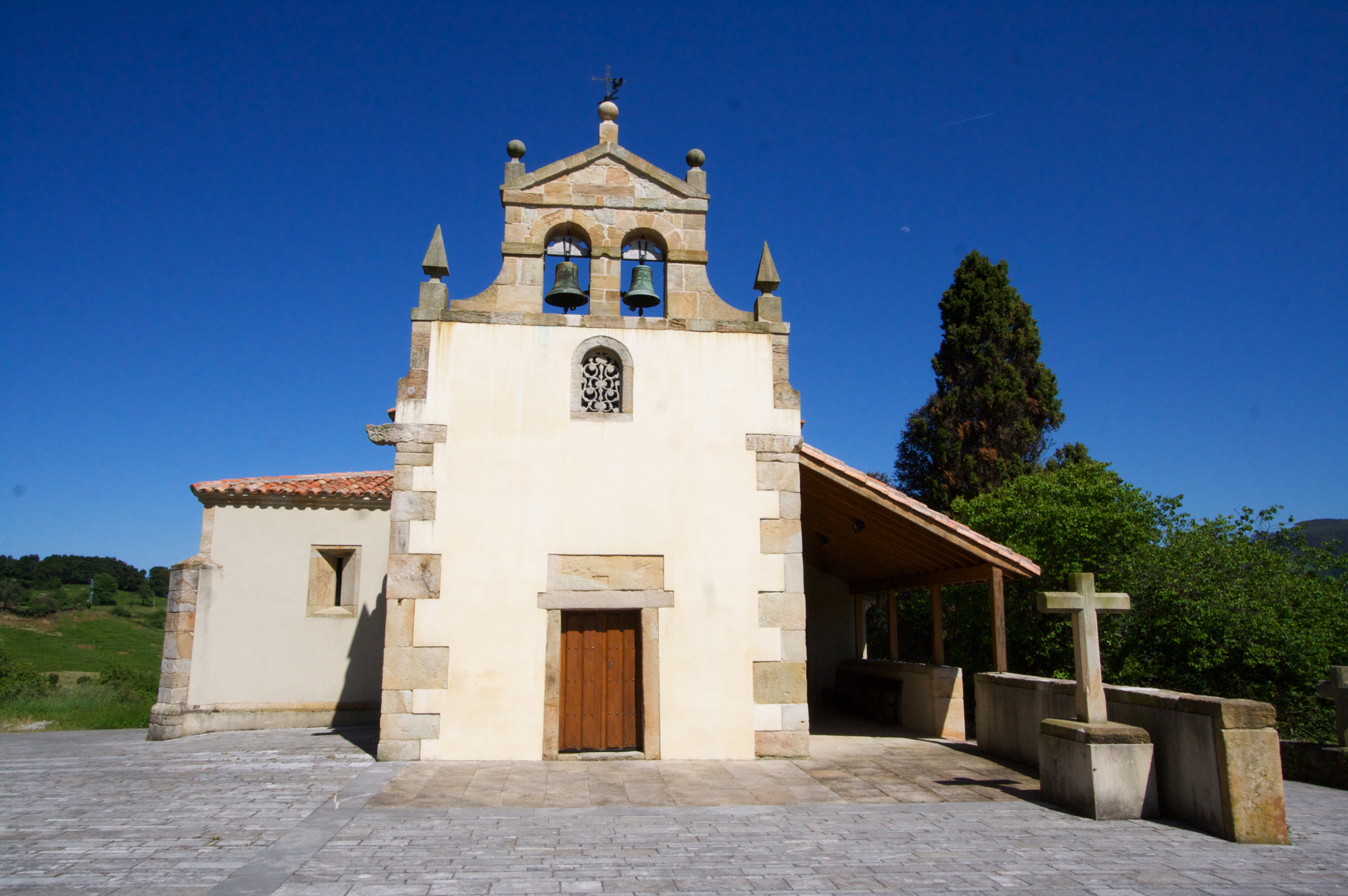
- Iglesia de San Andrés (Bedriñana)
- 43.50044°N 5.43832°W
- Location: Asturias
- Country: Spain
- Denomination: Roman Catholic

Iglesia de San Andrés (Bedriñana) is a church in the parish of Bedriñana, Asturias, Spain. It dates to the 9th century and was declared a national monument in 1931.

== Architecture ==
The nave was built in the tenth century. Four of the original windows above the nave survive. Significant additional expansion occurred in the 12th-13th centuries and again in the 16th. In 1916, additional improvements were made to the building for use as a school.

== See also ==
- Catholic Church in Spain
