= San Pedru Ambás =

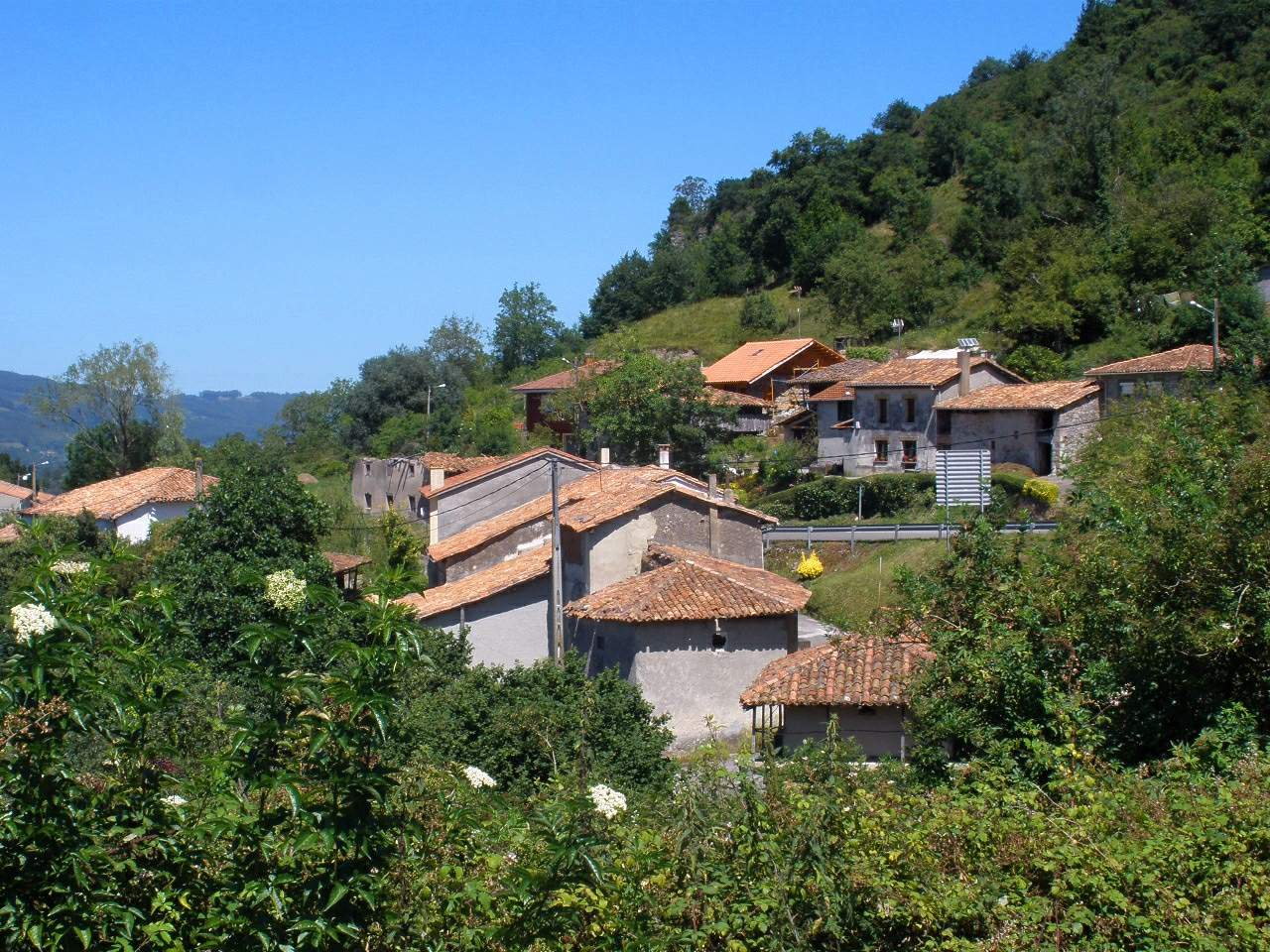

San Pedru Ambás is one of 41 parishes (administrative divisions) in Villaviciosa, a municipality within the province and autonomous community of Asturias, in northern Spain.

Situated at 171 m (561 ft) above sea level, the parroquia is 4.24 km^{2} (1.64 sq mi) in size, with a population of 138 (INE 2011). The postal code is 33311.

== Villages and hamlets ==
- Ambás 43°26′44.329776″N 5°29′5.425831″W
- Castiellu 43°27′11.579146″N 5°29′17.882118″W
- Daxa 43°26′28.067324″N 5°28′41.543693″W
- Lloses 43°26′33.649733″N 5°29′23.638871″W
- La Viesca 43°26′40.311194″N 5°28′29.134632″W
- Siana 43°27′33.818258″N 5°29′39.251122″W
- Villabona
