= Llera =

Llera may refer to:

- Llera, Badajoz, a municipality in Badajoz, Extremadura, Spain
- Llera, Tamaulipas, a municipality in Tamaulipas, Mexico
- La Llera, a parish in Colunga, Asturias, Spain
- La Llera (Villaviciosa), a parish in Villaviciosa, Asturias, Spain
- Miguel Llera, Spanish football defender
