= Grases =

Parish in the Asturian Villaviciosa council, Spain

Coordinates: 43.466667°N 5.466667°W

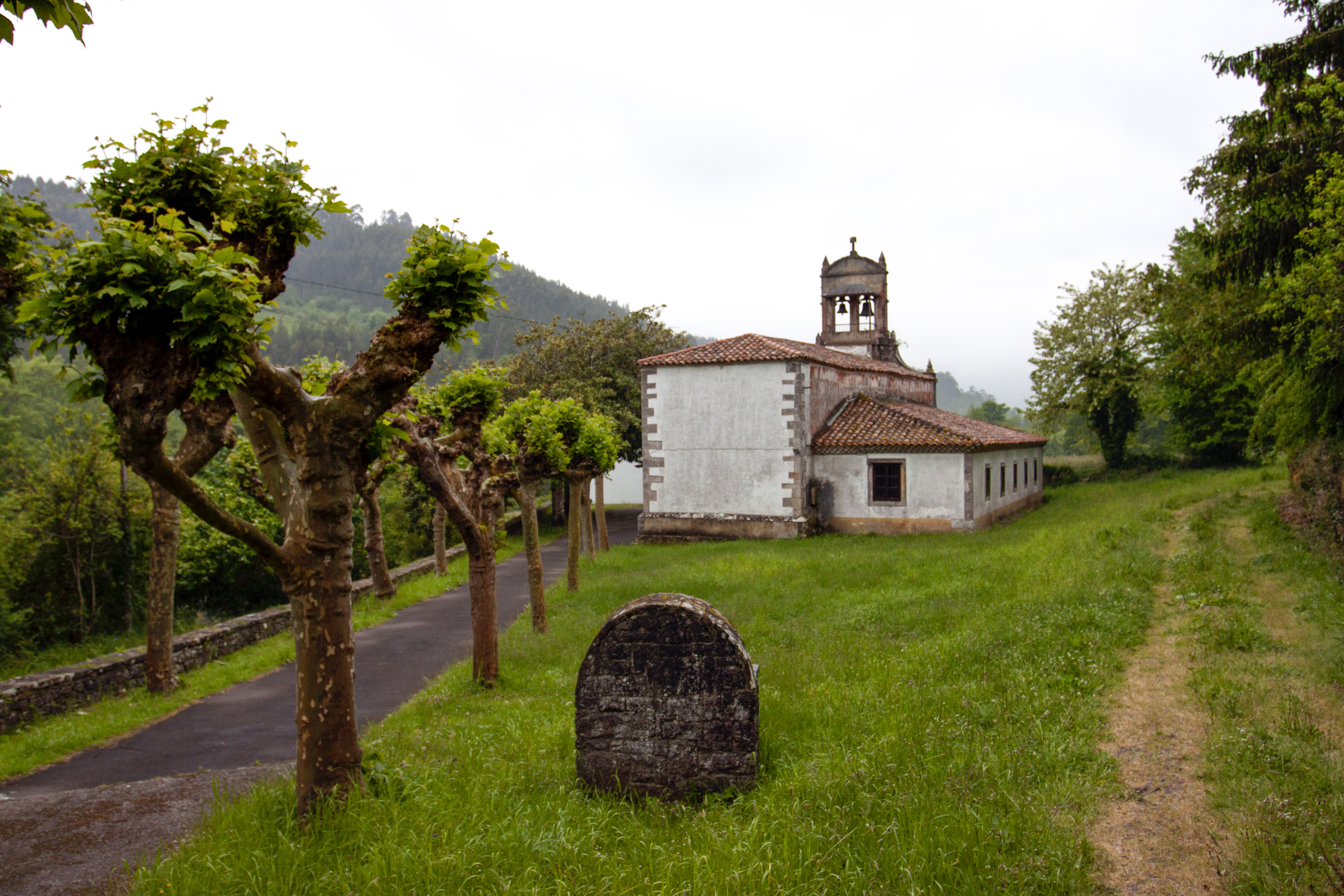
Grases

Grases (is one of 41 parishes (administrative divisions) in Villaviciosa, a municipality within the province and autonomous community of Asturias, in northern Spain.

Situated at 68 m (223 ft) above sea level, the parroquia is 2.78 km^{2} (1.07 sq mi) in size, with a population of 112 (INE 2007).

== Villages and hamlets ==
- Casquita
- El Mayorazu
- Grases
- Grases de Riba
- La Barraca
- La Llosa
- La Mota
- La Venta
- Los Cuadros
- Los Molinos
- Maoxu
- Sabudiellu

== Etymology ==
Xosé Lluis García Arias, in his book "Pueblos Asturianos: El Porqué de Sus Nombres" ("Asturian People: The Reasons Behind the Names"), explains the etymological significance for Grases and the people of the parroquia:

Grases: This is an anthroponym, or a toponym derived from the name of a person. It was probably attributed to the village before the formation of the present population. García Arias proposes that the name is derived from the Latin word CRASSUS.

El Mayorazo: According to García Arias, this refers to "the old civil institution where a family could perpetually enjoy certain patrimonial goods" (translated from Spanish). Mayorazu is derived from a combination of the Latin MAIOREM (higher) and the suffix -ACEUM.

== See also ==
- Demographics of Spain
