= Breceña =

Coordinates: 43.45°N 5.383333°W

Flag of Breceña

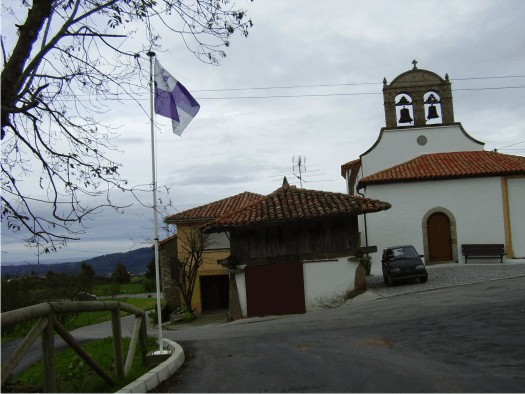
View of Breceña

Breceña is one of 41 parishes (administrative divisions) in Villaviciosa, a municipality within the province and autonomous community of Asturias, in northern Spain.

The parroquia is 6.71 km^{2} (2.59 sq mi) in size, with a population of 104 (INE 2005).

== Villages and hamlets ==
- Breceña
- Busllaz
- Ceyanes
- Cuetu
- El Charcón
- El Terreru
- La Infiesta
- La Vallina
- Llañana
- Ñovales
- Pandu
- Seli
- Sotu
