= Tazones =

Coordinates: 43.55°N 5.433333°W

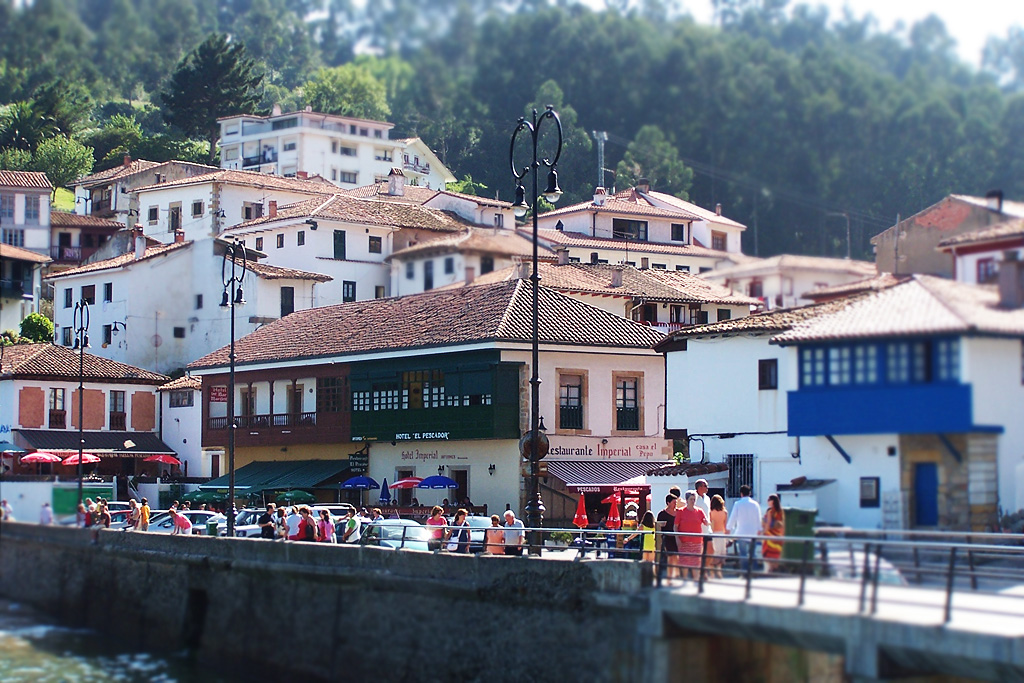
Tazones

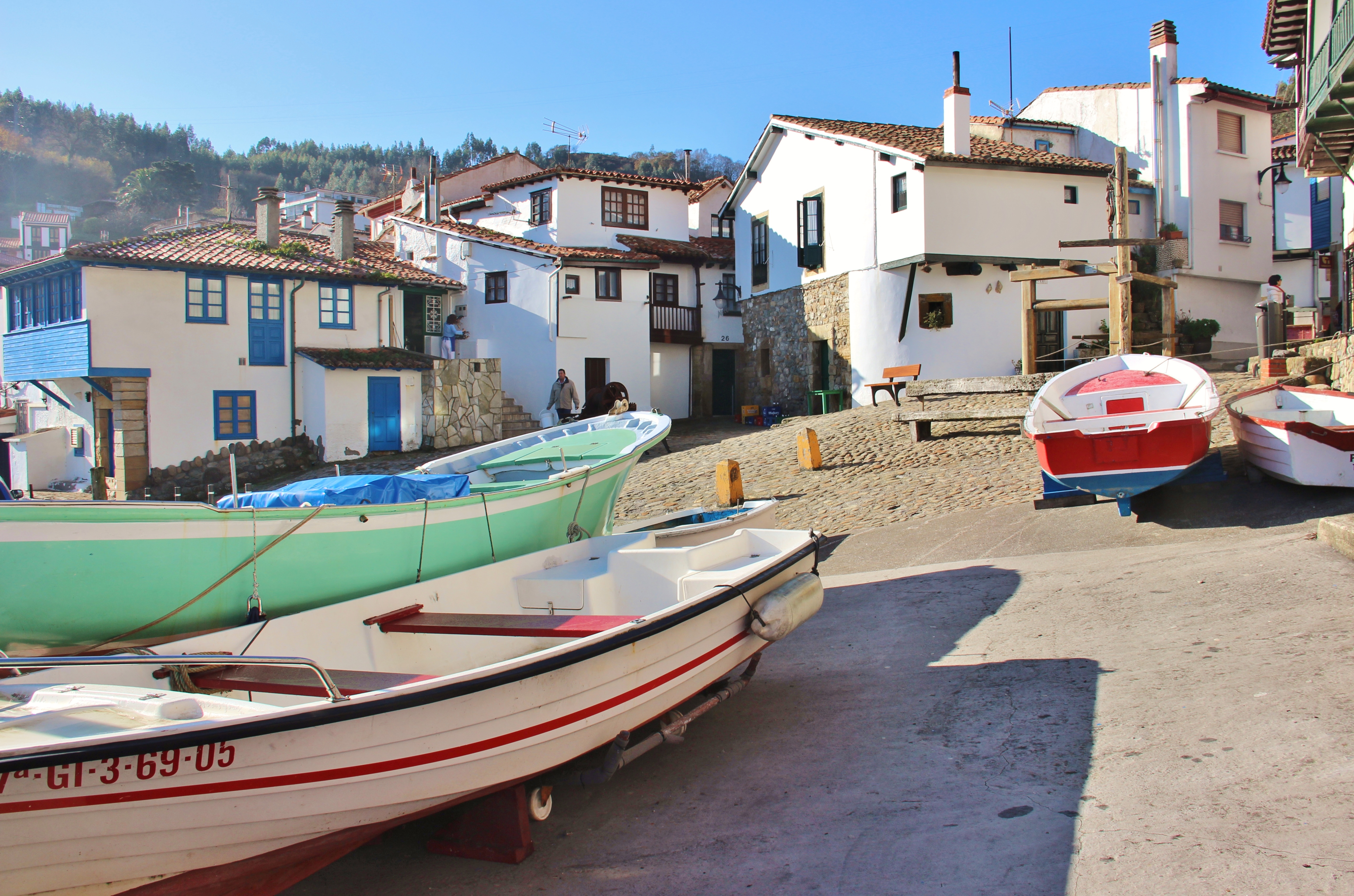
Fishers' houses

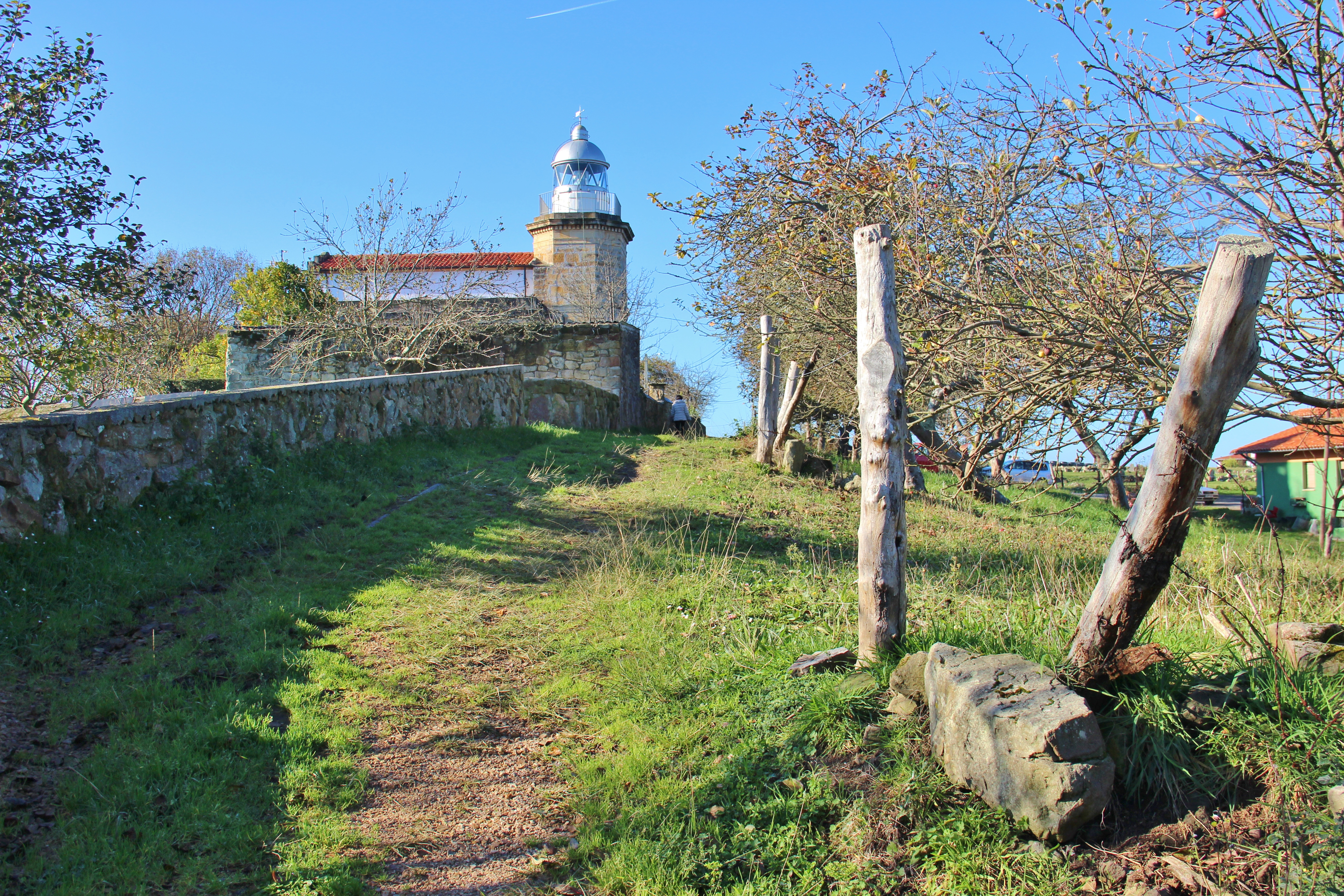
Tazones Lighthouse

Tazones is one of 41 parishes (administrative divisions) in Villaviciosa, a municipality within the province and autonomous community of Asturias, in northern Spain.

The parroquia is 3.51 km^{2} (1.36 sq mi) in size, with a population of 254 (INE 2006). Tazones is usually appointed as one of the most beautiful villages of Spain.

== Description ==
Tazones is located in the Asturian coast. It's an important tourist point and is well known because of its architecture and gastronomy. It was the place where Charles V made the landing before hold the Spanish throne in 1517.

=== Villages and hamlets ===
- La Talaya
- Les Mestres
- Samiguel
- San Roque
- Villar

==== Other minor places ====
- El Catalín
- El Repisón
- La Llanada
- Les Piedriquines
- Tazones
- Viadi

== Places ==
- 'The neighborhoods of San Miguel and San Roque are declared "Historic Artistic Ensemble" since June 17, 1991.
- The parish church of Tazones is located in the San Miguel neighborhood dating back to 1950. The primitive church of this parish located then in the San Roque neighborhood was burned in 1936 during the civil war, the image of the Manolin Child is the oldest of the temple since it is the only thing, next to a crucifix, that is conserved of the first. The rest of the figures were acquired in 1950 for the reopening highlighting among others the images of San Roque, the Virgin of Covadonga, the Sacred Heart, San Antonio and the two angels of the Virgin of the Rosary.
- Casa de las Conchas (Shell's house), in the San Roque neighborhood, is a house with a facade completely covered with shells of different shapes, sizes and colors.
- Lighthouse, built in 1864
- Dinosaur footprint, located near the beach.
