= Camoca =

Parish in Villaviciosa, Spain

Coordinates: 43.466667°N 5.466667°W

Camoca is one of 41 parishes (administrative divisions) in Villaviciosa, a municipality within the province and autonomous community of Asturias, in northern Spain.

The parroquia is 3.51 km^{2} (1.36 sq mi) in size, with a population of 132 (INE 2005).

== Villages and hamlets ==
- La Bustariega
- El Pulu Baxu
- El Pulu Riba
- El Campu
- La Corolla
- El Llanu
- El Monte
- Peruyeru
- La Piñera
- Reborión
- La Riega
- El Ronzón
- El Traviesu
- El Valle
- Vega
