= Quintueles =

Municipality in Spain

Coordinates: 43.55°N 5.5833°W

Quintueles is one of 41 parishes in Villaviciosa, a municipality within the province and autonomous community of Asturias, in northern Spain.

Situated at 88 m (289 ft) above sea level, the parroquia is 9.81 km^{2} (3.79 sq mi) in area, with a population of 663 (INE 2008).

Fossilised pterosaur tracks have been uncovered at Quintueles' Lastres Formation.

== Climate ==
The climate of Quintueles is oceanic, humid and generally temperate.

== Cuisine ==
Spanish beans are produced in great quantities in Quintueles. These Spanish beans, along with the local fish and shellfish, comprise the staple foods of the region. Popular dishes include Spanish beans with clams, sea urchins, goose barnacles, brown shrimp, velvet crabs, European spider crabs, conger eels, and whiting. The local cider is also produced in abundance.

== Cultural heritage ==
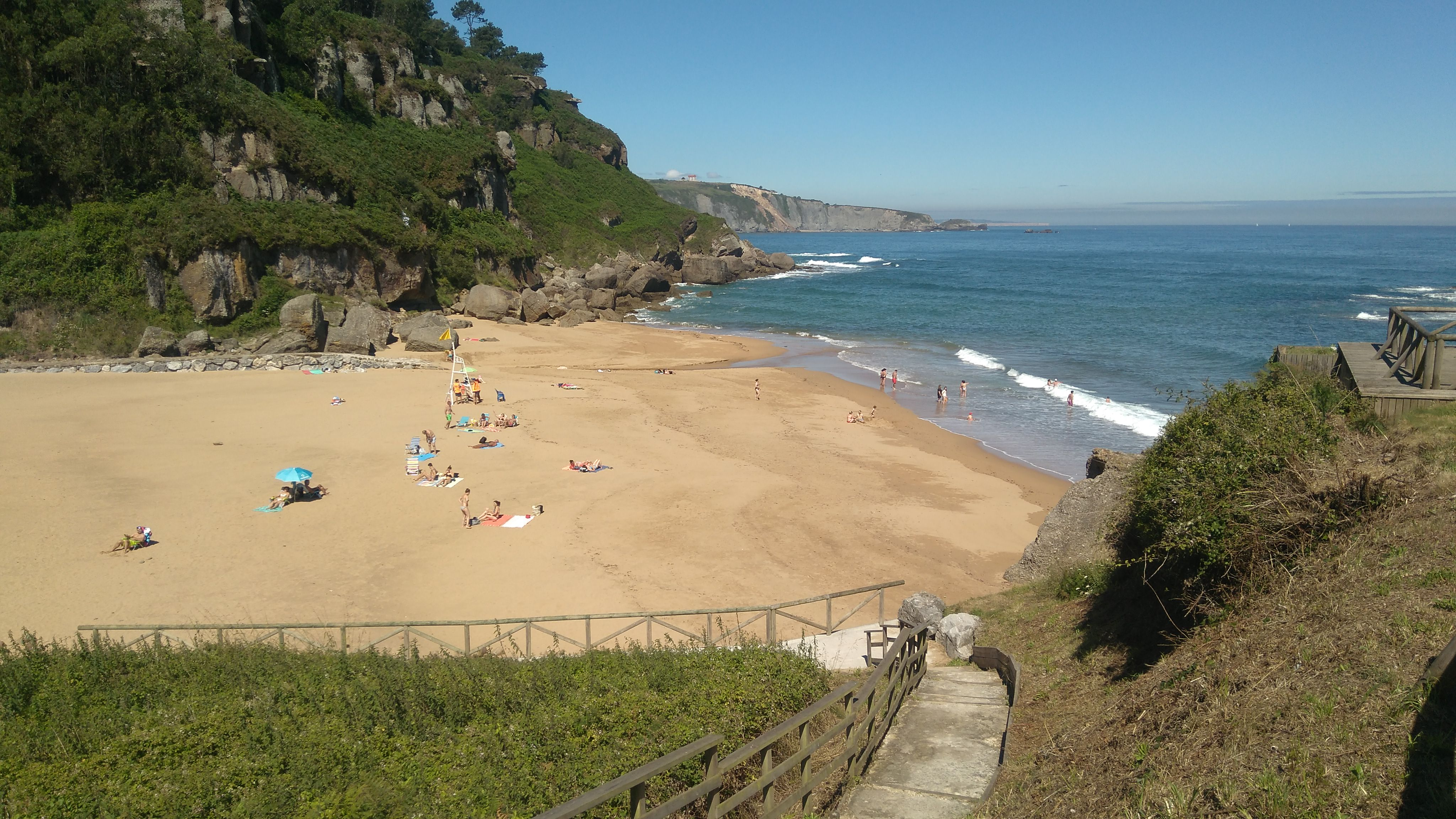
La Ñora beach.

Playa de La Ñora, a local beach, is a major attraction in the area.

Also worth mentioning are the local sandstone quarries. Folklore states that a fifteenth-century hermitage was situated among the quarries. Upon paying homage to the Virgin of the Snows, the hermit was said to have received the protection of a large oak tree for his dwelling.

== Directions to Quintueles ==
Beginning from Gijón, take the A-8 toward Santander and leave at junction 378 for Quintueles. On entering the town, bear left at the intersection with the N-632. After 200 metres, turn right onto highway VV-I in the direction of Playa de la Ñora. After two kilometres is Quintueles' school and church, which are an important part of the community. Another option is to follow the N-632 road towards Villaviciosa. Shortly after passing the installation of Llorea is the council of Gijón. Continue past Villaviciosa to arrive in the town of Quintueles. After three more kilometres the route reaches the bypass to Playa de la Ñora. Quintueles is approximately 10 kilometres from Gijón.

== Festivals ==
Date	Spanish name	English name
April	Gastronómico de la Llámpara.	Cuisine of the Lamp.
Aug. 5	Fiesta de Granderroble.	Festival of the Large Oak Tree.
Aug. 5	Fiesta de la Virgen de las Nieves.	Festival of the Virgin of the Snows.
Aug. 24	Fiesta de San Bartolomé.	Festival of Saint Bartholomew.
Nov. 23	Fiesta de San Clemente.	Festival of Saint Clement.

Cuisine of the Lamp (Gastronómico de la Llámpara), is a festival organized by the Trumpet Society of Cultural Recreation (Sociedad Cultural Recreativa Clarín) of a neighbouring municipality, Quintes. The festival is hosted by the townsfolk of both Quintueles and Quintes.

== Location ==
Quintueles is situated on the flat coast of Spain's Cantabrian Sea. It is approximately 19 kilometres from Villaviciosa and 12 kilometres from Gijón. Quintueles is a coastal town with beautiful, tall cliffs that overlook the Cantabrian Sea. Quintueles currently has a population of 663 people and there are about 460 dwellings. The town has an area of 9,81 square kilometres; the sea marks its northern border, while Gijón lies to the west, Quintes to the east and San Miguel de Arroes to the south.

Quintueles populated places include:

- Rovigo
- Quintueles

Other minor places are:

- Ca Castor
- Capellanía
- Cazamular
- Cerreo
- El Fielato
- El Graneru
- El Llendón
- El Peñucal
- El Regatón
- El Vayu
- Friúz
- Granderroble
- La Casona
- La Corolla
- La Güerta
- La Rasuca
- La Tuerba
- La Venta la Esperanza
- Los Pisones
- Mataoveya
- San Clemente

== Local economy ==
The Quintueles community has been dedicated to agriculture and stockbreeding for generations, but the modern trend is displaying growth in the service sector.

Many find the appeal of Quintueles to be its convenient location—it is near a large city, but the distance is great enough to maintain a pastoral atmosphere. This theory, however, is simply speculation.

== Wildlife ==
The landscape of Quintueles is dominated by cultivated fields and orchards in the plains zones. Quintueles also has forests of eucalyptus, with a few native laurels, chestnut trees, oaks, and hazelnut trees. Ferns, furzes, and brambles may also be found in thickets.

This area is filled with animals typically found in coastal regions. Marine birds, namely seagulls and hawks, are common. Migratory birds such as swallows, thrushes and starlings are also present. Weasels, squirrels, boars, and foxes are found in the forests.
