= Oles (Villaviciosa) =

Coordinates: 43.5376°N 5.4213°W

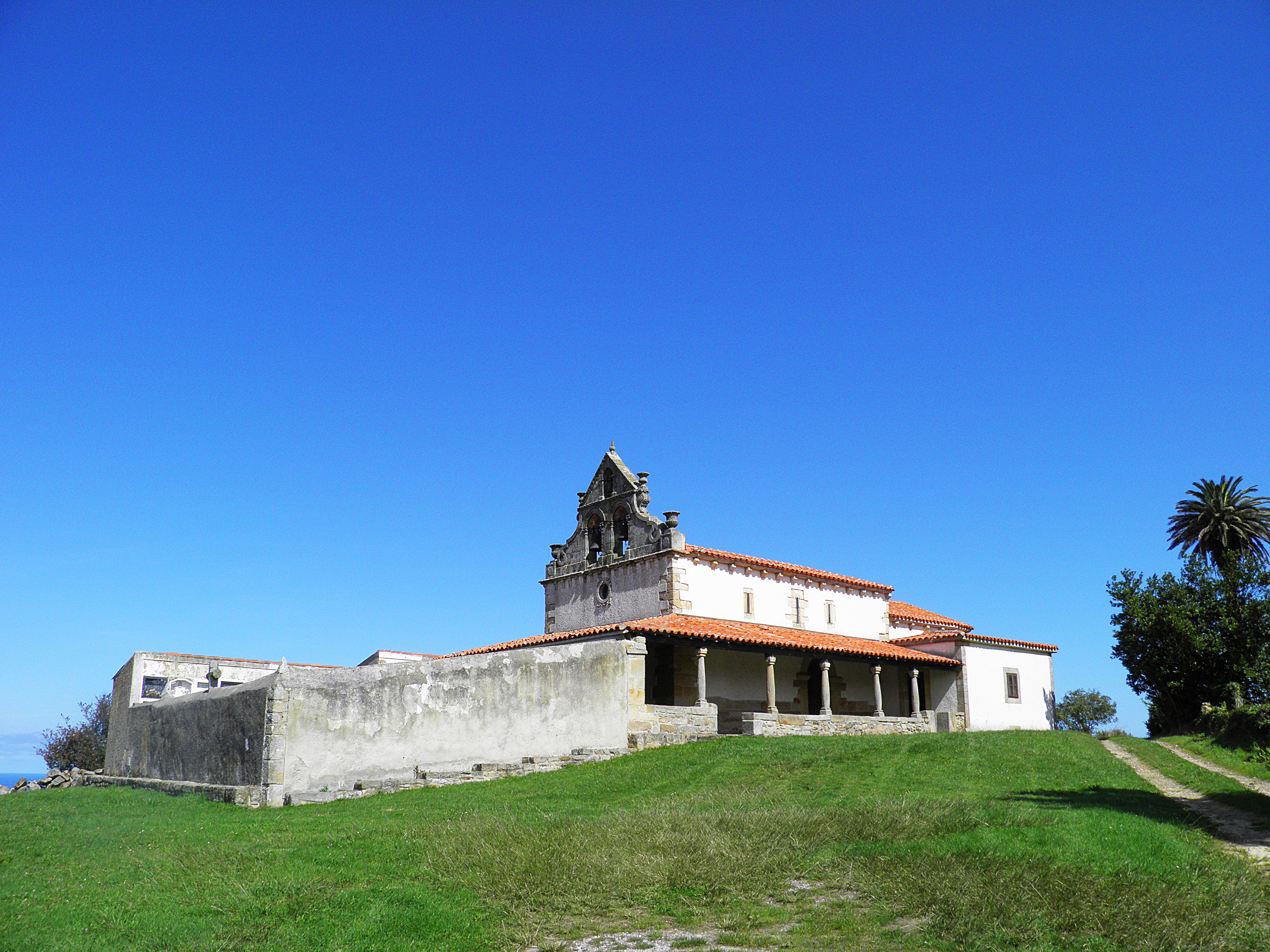
Oles (Villaviciosa, Asturias)

Oles is one of 41 parishes (administrative divisions) in Villaviciosa, a municipality within the province and autonomous community of Asturias, in coastal northern Spain.

The parroquia is 10.22 km^{2} (3.95 sq mi) in size, with a population of 438.

== Villages ==
The villages of Oles include:

- El Pidal
- La Lloraza
- Les Areñes
- Llata
- Miénagos
- Ñovales
- Oles
- Piedresblanques
- Santa Mariña
- Tueru

== See also ==
Church of Santa Eulalia de la Lloraza
