= Argüeru =

Coordinates: 43.533333°N 5.466667°W

Argüeru is one of 41 parishes (administrative divisions) in Villaviciosa, a municipality within the province and autonomous community of Asturias, in northern Spain.

The parroquia is 12.4 km^{2} (4.8 sq mi) in size, with a population of 495 (INE 2005). The postal code is 33314.

== Villages and hamlets ==
- Argüeru
- Cuatrocaminos
- El Camín Rial
- El Toral
- La Merina
- La Quintana
