= Amandi (Villaviciosa) =

Coordinates: 43.466667°N 5.433333°W

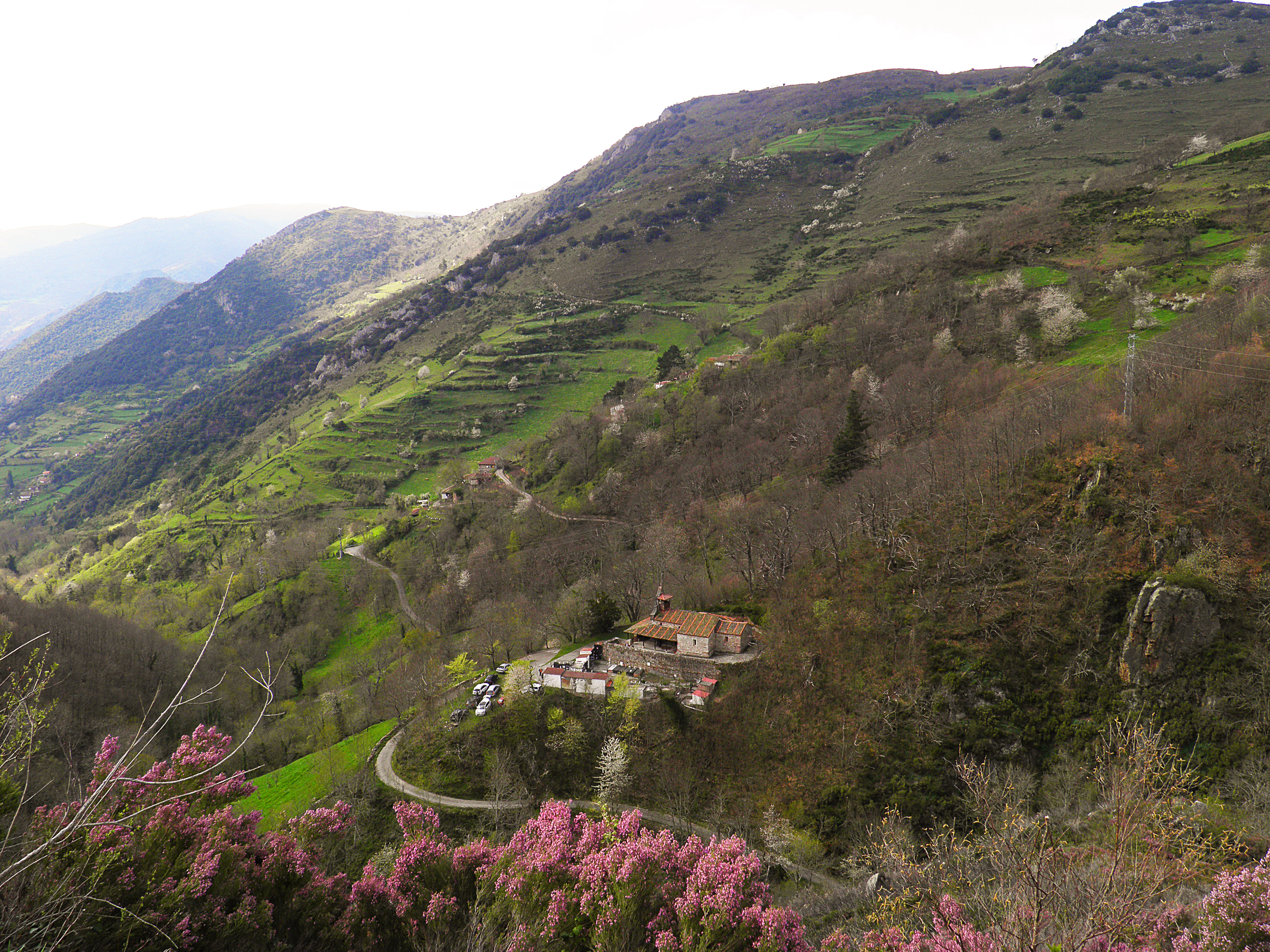
Clavillas (Somiedo, Asturias)

Amandi is one of 41 parishes (administrative divisions) in Villaviciosa, a municipality within the province and autonomous community of Asturias, in northern Spain.

Situated at 171 m (561 ft) above sea level, the parroquia is 5.06 km^{2} (1.95 sq mi) in size, with a population of 519 (INE 2011). The postal code is 33311.

== Villages and hamlets ==
- Algara
- Amandi
- Bozanes
- Casquita
- Conciella
- El Llugarín
- El Palaciu
- El Sur
- Gordinayu
- La Ferrería
- La Gotera
- La Mesada
- La Parra
- La Poladura
- La Quinta
- La Roza
- La Vega
- Les Baragañes
- Llavares
- Los Campos
- Obaya
- Pumarín
- San Xuan
- Valbúcar
- Vitienes
- Ximangues
