= Arnín =

Coordinates: 43.466667°N 5.433333°W

Arnín is one of 41 parishes (administrative divisions) in Villaviciosa, a municipality within the province and autonomous community of Asturias, in northern Spain.

== Population ==
The parroquia is 1.24 km^{2} (0.48 sq mi) in size, with a population of 9 (INE 2006). The postal code is 33326.

== Location ==
Although administratively belonging Villaviciosa, the church administration has the head of the parish in the annexed population of Pivierda, in Colunga. Half of the bridge that leads into Arnín marks the division of the two councils, separated at this point by the river.

The village of Arnín is about 80 meters above sea level, at 16.5 km from the capital of the council. It is reached by Highway VV-12 and AS-332.

== Villages and hamlets ==
- Arnín
- Cardegoda
- El Cayu
