= Bedriñana =

Coordinates: 43.5°N 5.433333°W

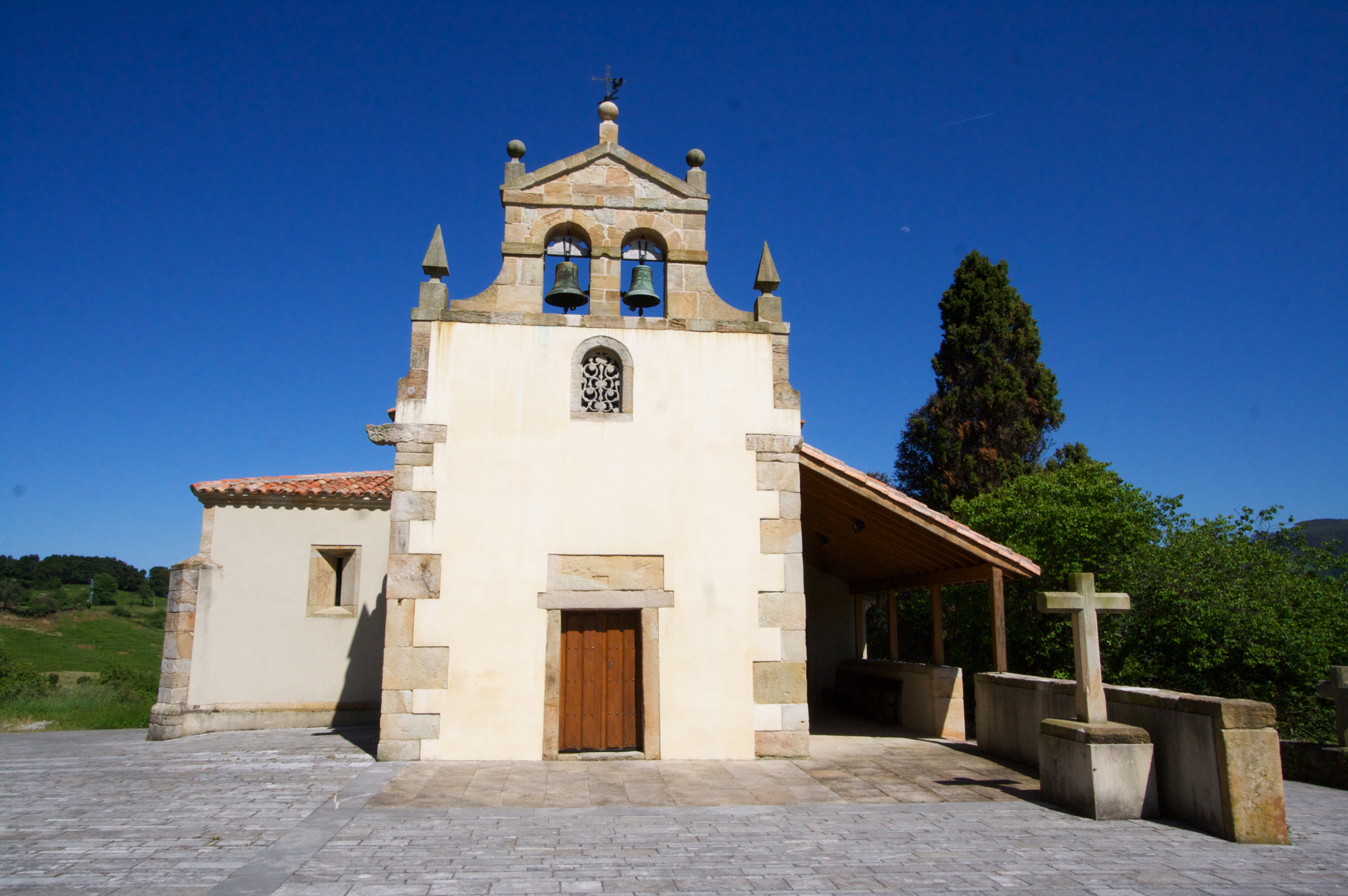
Church of San Andrés de Bedriñana

Bedriñana is one of 41 parishes (administrative divisions) in Villaviciosa, a municipality within the province and autonomous community of Asturias, in northern Spain.

The parroquia is 8.77 km^{2} (3.39 sq mi) in size, with a population of 253 (INE 2005).

== Villages and hamlets ==
- Cabañes
- El Llugar
- El Porréu
- El Retiro
- La Campa
- La Ermita
- La Peruyera
- La Riega
- Les Maseres
- Los Torales
- Pentanes
