= Parroquia =

Parroquia (Spanish: [paˈrokja], Galician: [paˈrɔkjɐ], pl. parroquias; Asturian: [paˈrokja], pl. parroquies) or Parròquia (Catalan: [pəˈrɔkiə], pl. parròquies) is a term equivalent to the English parish and is used in Andorra, Ecuador, Venezuela, Peru and some parts of northwestern Spain.

It can be found in the following countries:

- Parròquia (Andorra)
- Parroquia (Ecuador)
- Parroquia (Spain)
- Parroquia (Venezuela)
