= Iglesia de Santo Tomás (Coro) =

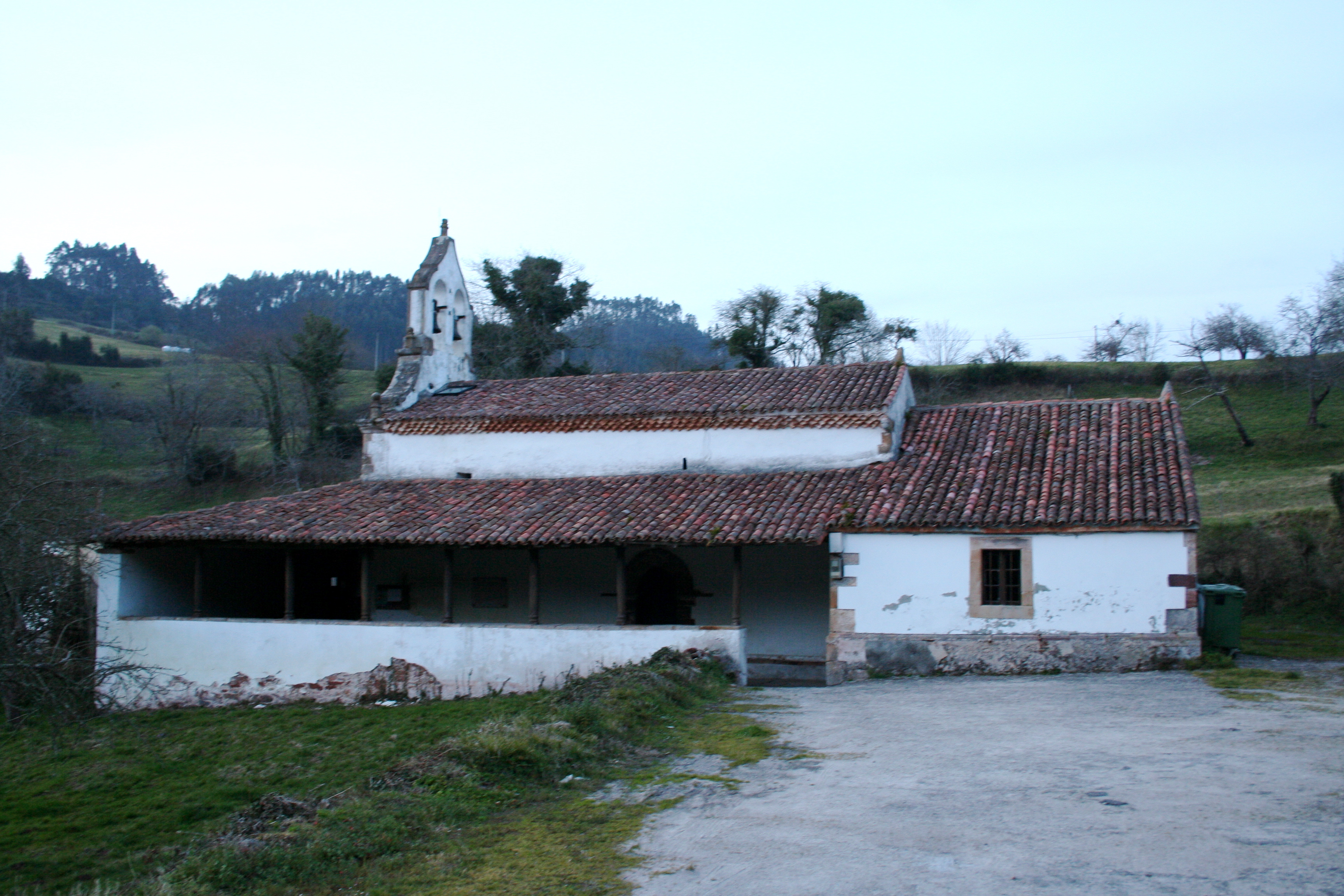
- Iglesia de Santo Tomás (Coro)
- 43.45973°N 5.40008°W
- Location: Asturias, Spain

Iglesia de Santo Tomás located in Coro, in the municipality of Villaviciosa in Asturias, Spain, is a rural Romanesque church from the second half of the 13th century. It consists of a single rectangular nave and square chancel, with a sacristy attached, lower on the outside, to the South wall of the chancel, and a porch closed on the West side, open on seven wooden columns on the South.

== Features ==
The interior has a pointed triumphal arch with two plain archivolts, supported by three columns on each side with anthropomorphic and zoomorphic truncated pyramid-shaped capitals.

The nave is covered with a horizontal wooden structure, and the chancel with a pointed barrel vault on the imposts, in which there are three anthropomorphic corbels and a capital.

On the exterior, the sale of the head wall stands out, in semicircular arch with a column on each side and capitals of leaves, and the two doorways. The western doorway, has two pointed archivolts and a praying figure in the soffit, and is decorated with balls and three anthropomorphic figures, which rest on a molded impost and buttresses. The southern doorway has a pointed arch with a plinth and an impost on the buttresses, and the right one has a carved four-petalled flower.
