= Samartín de Vallés =

Coordinates: 43.433333°N 5.35°W

Samartín de Vallés is one of 41 parishes (administrative divisions) in Villaviciosa, a municipality within the province and autonomous community of Asturias, in northern Spain.

The parroquia has a population of 93 (INE 2008). The postal code is 33310.

== Villages and hamlets ==
- Samartín
- Piedrafita
- Sietes

=== Other minor places ===
- Comeñes
- El Barrial
- El Campón
- El Cantu
- El Carbayal
- El Cotaraxu
- El Cuetu
- El Nurusiellu
- El Pueblu
- El Vau
- Fresnéu
- L'Acebellín
- La Carbayera
- La Merina
- La Quintana
- La Verdial
- Lluexe
- Perviyao
