= La Llera (Villaviciosa) =

Coordinates: 43.483333°N 5.333333°W

La Llera is one of 41 parishes (administrative divisions) in Villaviciosa, a municipality within the province and autonomous community of Asturias, in northern Spain.

The parroquia is 2.17 km^{2} (0.84 sq mi) in size, with a population of 13 (INE 2007).

== Villages ==
- La Cabañona
- La Llastra

=== Otres places ===
- El Cantu
- La Drada
- Panizales
