= Quintes =

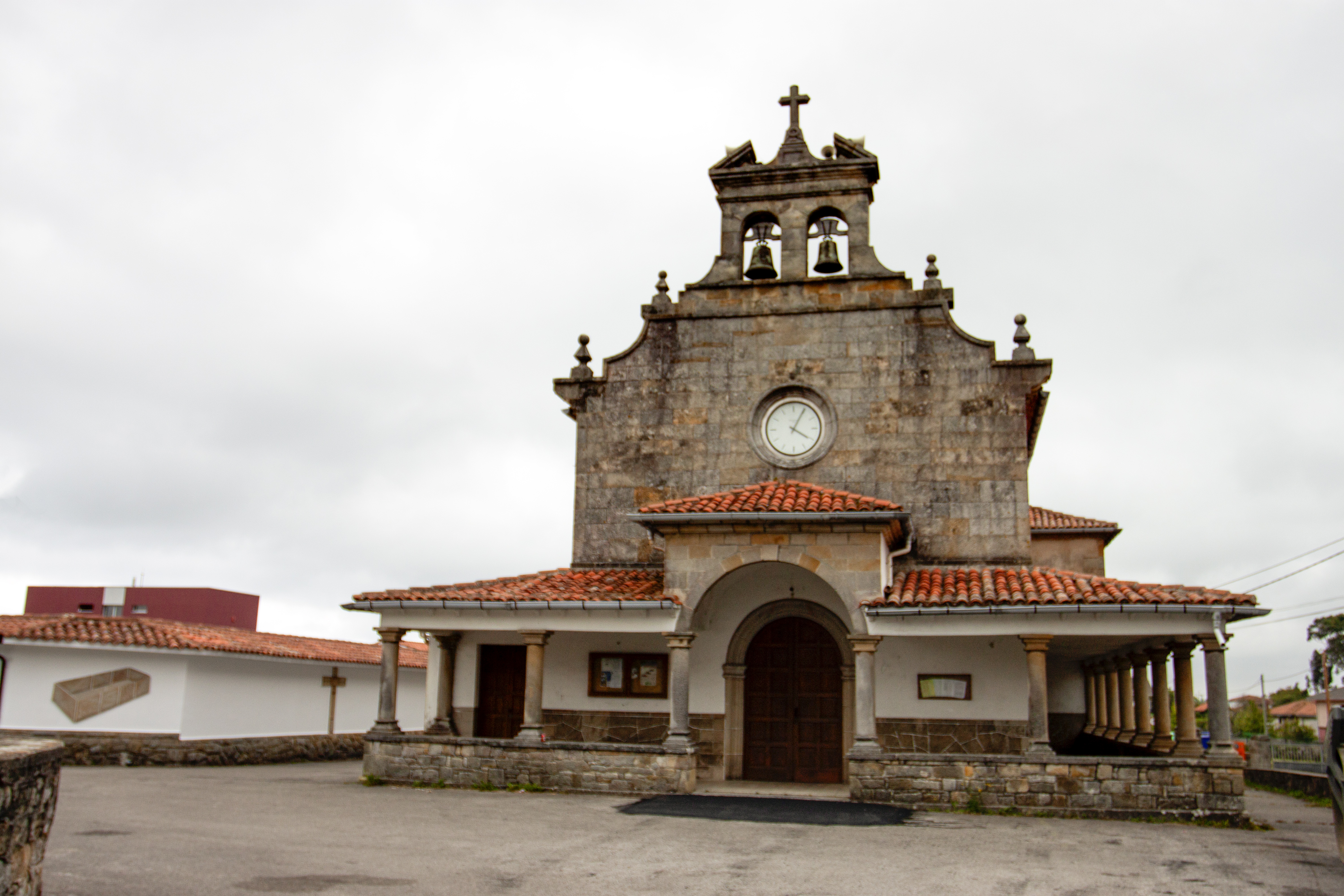
- Church in Quintes (Villaviciosa, Asturias)
- Interactive map of Quintes

Quintes is one of the westernmost towns of the municipality of Villaviciosa, Asturias, Spain. It is located on the left side of the river Rio España, 17 km from the town of Villaviciosa and 14 km from Gijón. It is a coastal town over the Cantabrian Sea. The beach, in the estuary of the Rio España, receives a large number of visitors throughout the year, especially during the peak holiday season.

== Territory and population ==
Quintes comprises the districts of Santana, Barrumediu and Cimavilla. It has a land area of approximately 5 km2, and a population of approximately 500, which up to doubles in the summer and holiday season due to tourism influx.

The town is located near arenaceous quarries typical of the Asturias region.

The production of cider is a mainstay of the town's economy, and is a typical local delicacy around the area of Villaviciosa.

== Villages ==
- Cimavilla
- Quintes

=== Other minor places ===
- Barrumediu
- El Ferrerón
- El Gancéu
- El Pielgu
- El Regatón
- El Veriñal
- L'Arrabalde
- La Carbayera
- La Escalera
- La Gaspia
- La Viesca
- Los Llanos
- Peñablanca
- Santana

== Terrain and climate ==
Quinites occupies a flat coast bordering the valley of the Rio España in the east, and its coast is split by the Riega de Escalera, which runs from south to north and separates the districts of Santana and Barrumediu.

The climate is humid with generally mild temperatures.

=== Flora and fauna ===
The land of Quintes is occupied by meadows and farm land in the flat areas. The area near the Rio España is populated with forests of eucalyptus, autochthonous trees (mainly laurels, chestnuts, oaks and hazels), and some scrubs, ferns, and brambles. The nearby wildlife is that of a coastal biome, with some marine birds, such as gulls and hawks, as well as migratory birds including thrushes and starlings.

== Festivals ==
The festival of Saint Anne (Santa Ana) is celebrated from July 26 to the 28th. Other festivals take place throughout the year, among them the celebrations on 20 January in honor of Saint Fabián and Saint Sebastian, the town's patron saints.

The Gastronomical Festival of la Llámpara is celebrated in the spring in Quintes and Quintueles, and is organized by the Recreational Cultural Society Clarín of Quintes in collaboration with the hostels of both towns.
