= Seloriu =

Parish in Asturias, Spain

Coordinates: 43.514672°N 5.367058°W

Seloriu is one of 41 parishes (administrative divisions) in Villaviciosa, a municipality within the province and autonomous community of Asturias, in northern Spain.

== Villages and hamlets ==
- Bárzana
- Castiellu
- El Picu
- El Rebollal
- Espina
- La Busta
- La Fuentona
- La Rasa
- Santa Mera
- Seloriu
- Vega
- Villar

=== Other minor places ===
- Balbín
- Carrocéu
- Castiellu de Baxu
- Castiellu de Riba
- El Chiscón
- El Crespu
- El Cuetu
- El Llosicu
- El Llugar
- El Pandal
- El Piensu
- El Terienzu
- El Traveseru
- L'Altu Pataleta
- L'Ariella
- L'Avís
- L'Erón
- La Cai
- La Caleya
- La Casa'l Molín de Riba
- La Casa'l Pelucu
- La Corolla
- La Fontana
- La Griega
- La Llosa Perico
- La Llosica
- La Piniella
- La Quintana [de La Busta]
- La Quintana [de La Cai]
- La Reguerina
- La Sienra
- La Sirviella
- La Vitoria
- Les Calzaes
- Les Cases de Baxu
- Les Cases de Riba
- Les Cases del Monte
- Llagua
- Los Calieros
- Matallobil
- Misiegu
- Olivar
- Rodiles
- San Llorenti
- Valdeiglar
