= Igreja de Santa Eulália do Mosteiro de Arnoso =

Church building in Vila Nova de Famalicão, Braga District, Portugal

Coordinates: 41.4670984°N 8.5225274°W

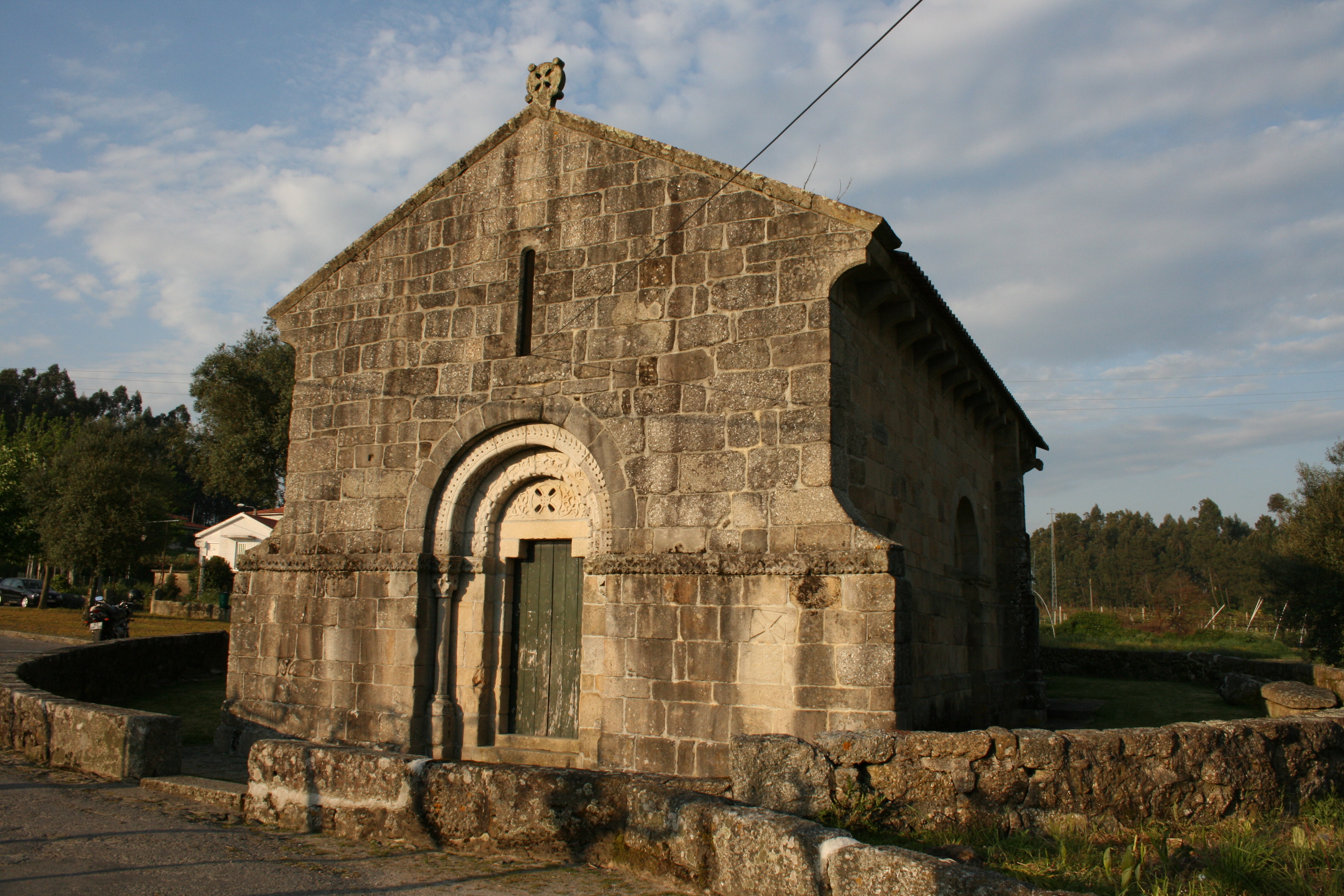
Church of Santa Eulalia of the Monastery of Arnoso

Church of Santa Eulalia of the Monastery of Arnoso (Portuguese: Igreja de Santa Eulália do Mosteiro de Arnoso) is a church in Vila Nova de Famalicão, Portugal. It was classified as a National Monument in 1938.

== History ==
The original church was founded in the 7th century on the initiative of San Frutuoso, Bishop of Dume and Braga during the Visigoth era, and destroyed by the Moors in the 11th century. It was later rebuilt by King García II of Galicia.

== Architecture ==
It is a simple church in early Romanesque style with a nave, a barrel vault and a rectangular apse with blind arches. The wooden portal consist of round arches and a tympanum with a cross pattée. These round arches are profusely decorated with geometric, intertwined and zoomorphic elements.

Inside the church there are a few sixteenth century frescoes with episodes from the life of Our Lady.

The two crosses on top of the roof show some similarities with Celtic crosses.
