= Villaviciosa, Asturias =

Villaviciosa
- Municipality
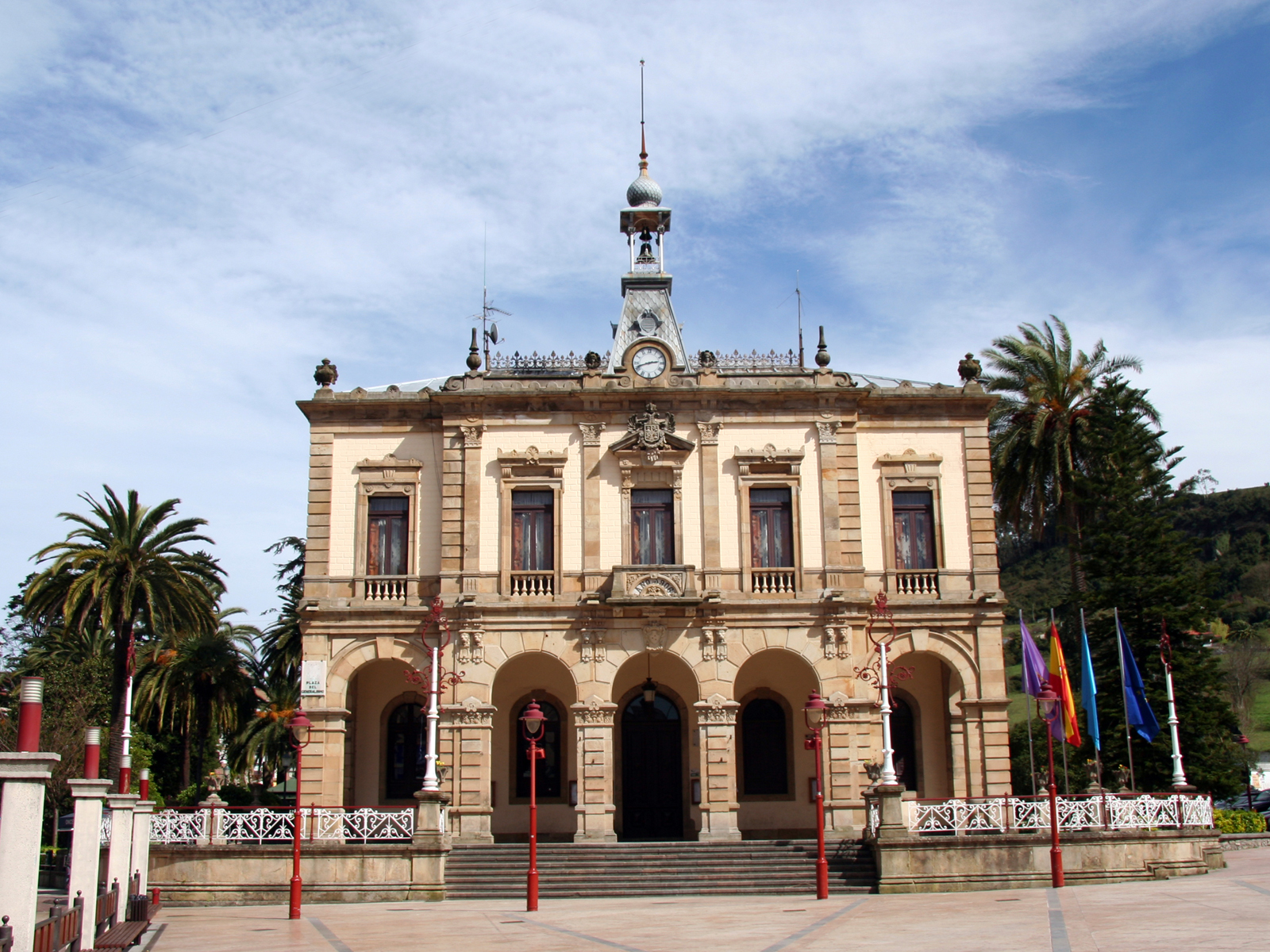
- Villaviciosa city hall

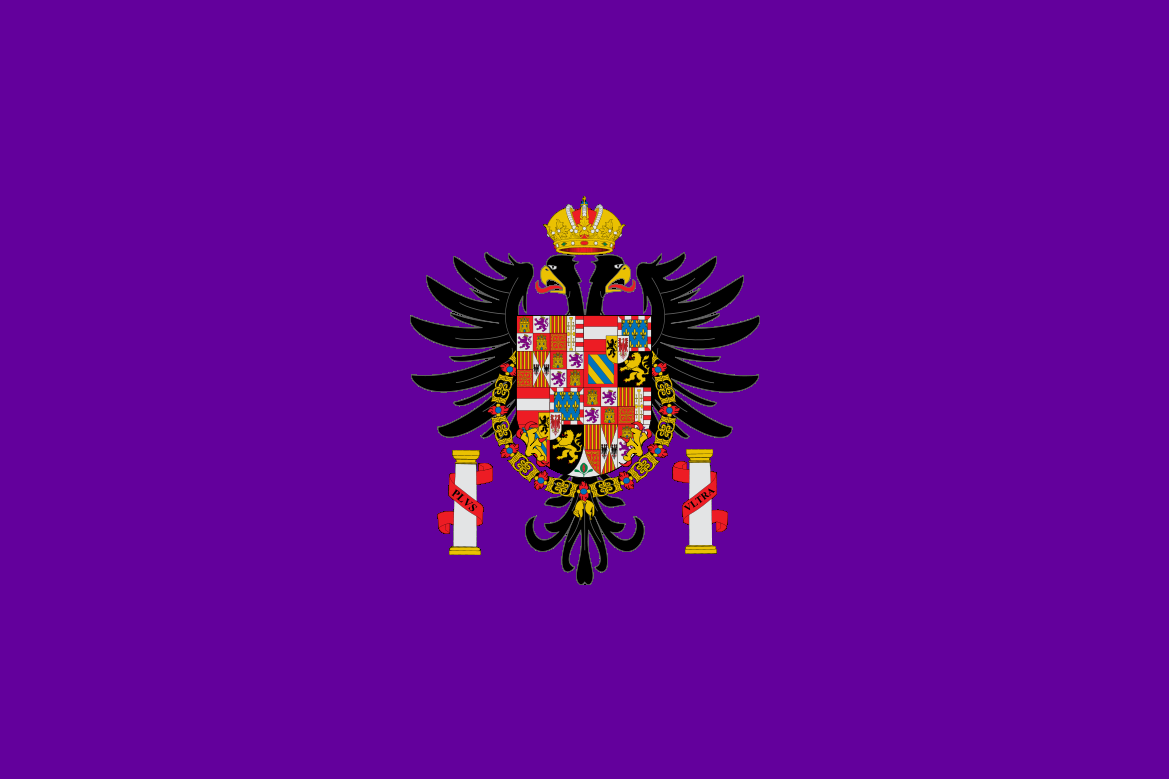
- Flag Coat of arms
- Location of Villaviciosa
- Location within Asturias Location within Spain
- Coordinates: 43°29′N 5°26′W
- Country: Spain
- Autonomous community: Asturias
- Province: Asturias
- Comarca: Gijón
- Founded: 17 October 1270
- Capital: Villaviciosa

Government
  - Alcalde: Manuel Busto Alonso (Unión Asturianista)

Area
  - Total: 276.23 km^{2} (106.65 sq mi)
- Elevation: 662 m (2,172 ft)

Population (2025-01-01)
  - Total: 15,379
  - Density: 55.675/km^{2} (144.20/sq mi)
- Demonym: maliayo/a
- Time zone: UTC+1 (CET)
  - Summer (DST): UTC+2 (CEST)
- Postal code: 33300 and 33310 al 33318
- Official language(s): Spanish
- Website: Official website

Villaviciosa (Spanish and Asturian pronunciation: [biʎaβiˈθjosa]) is a town and municipality in the autonomous community of Asturias, Spain.

== Geography ==
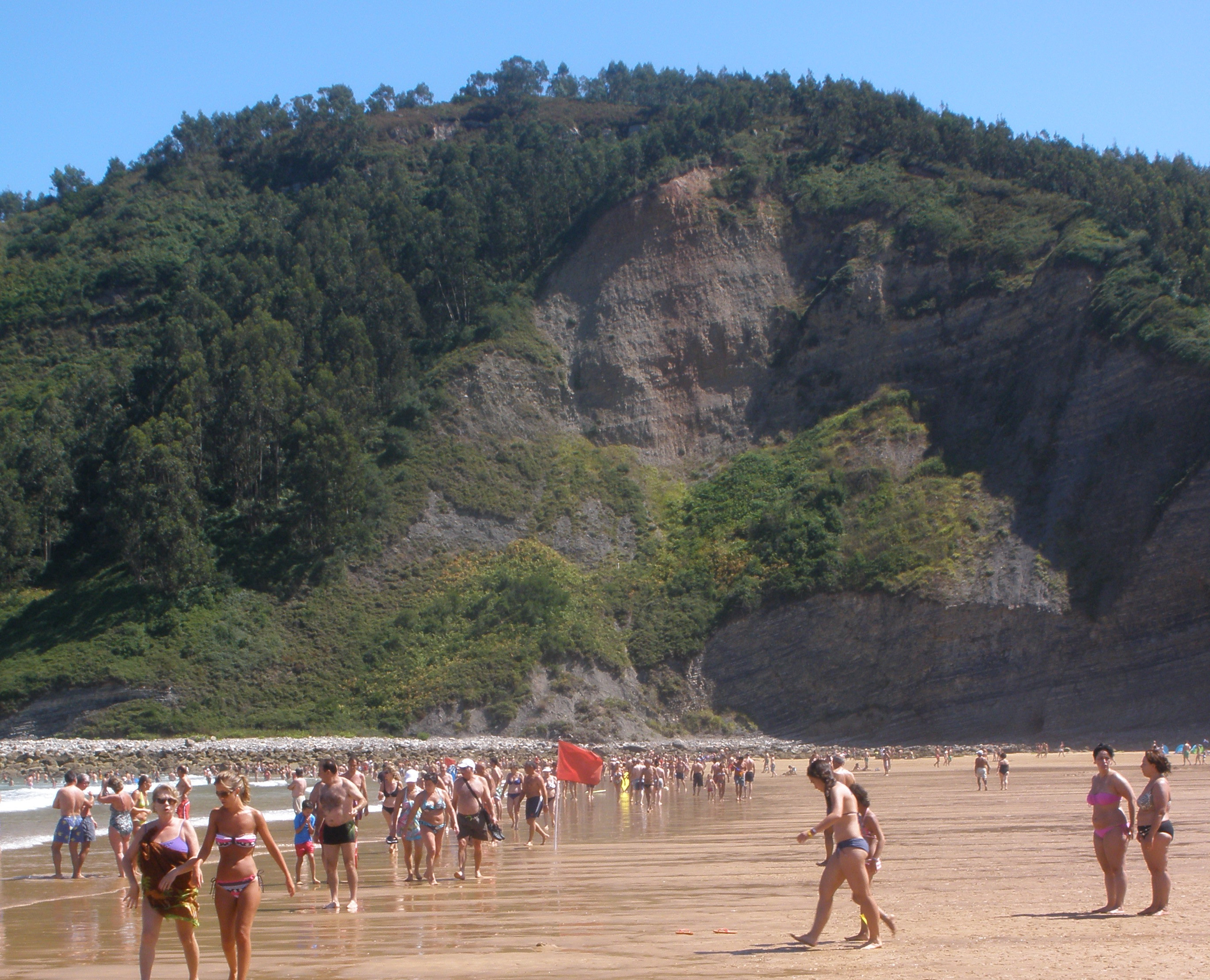
Rodiles beach

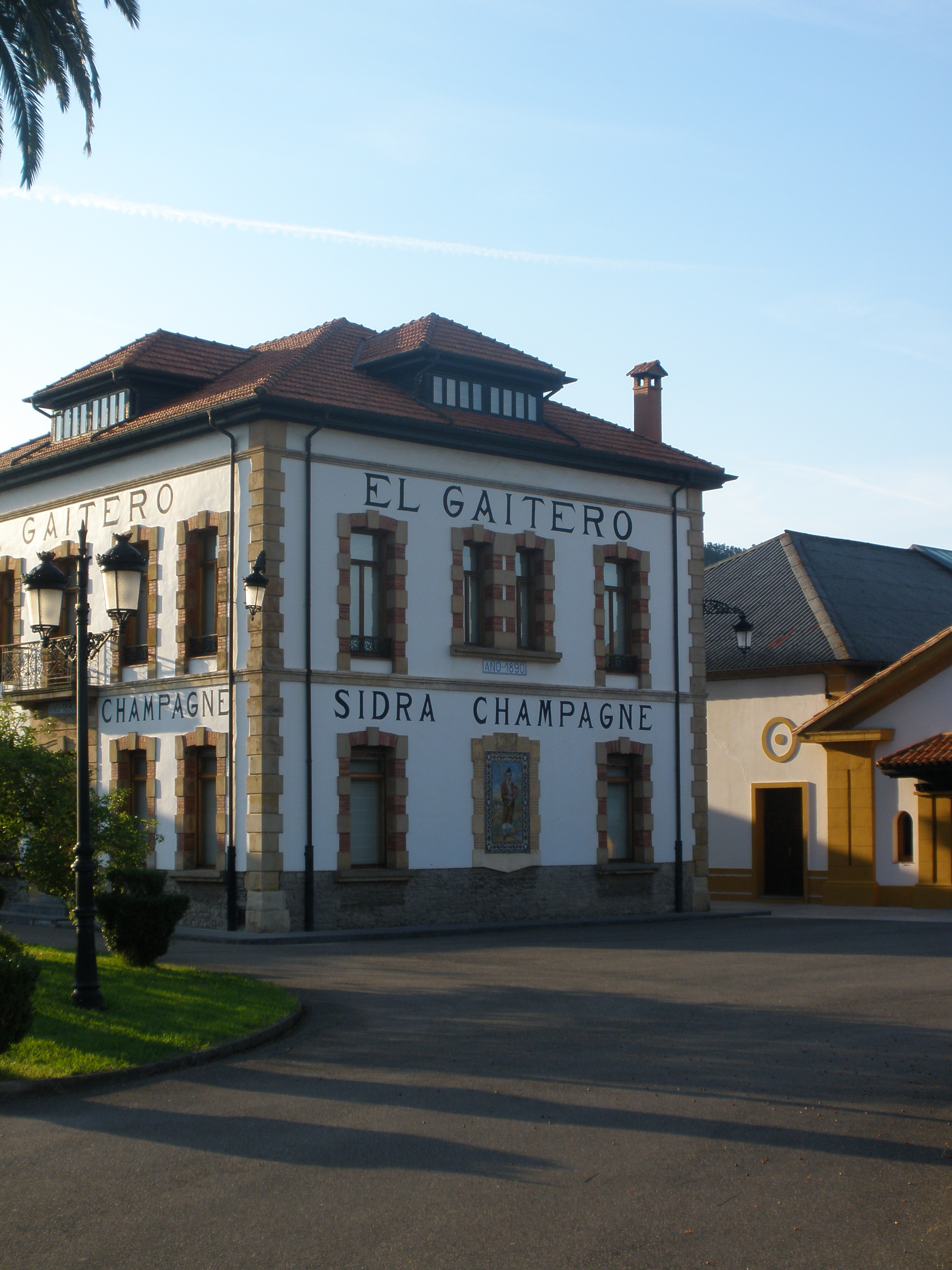
El Gaitero, champagne-cider factory

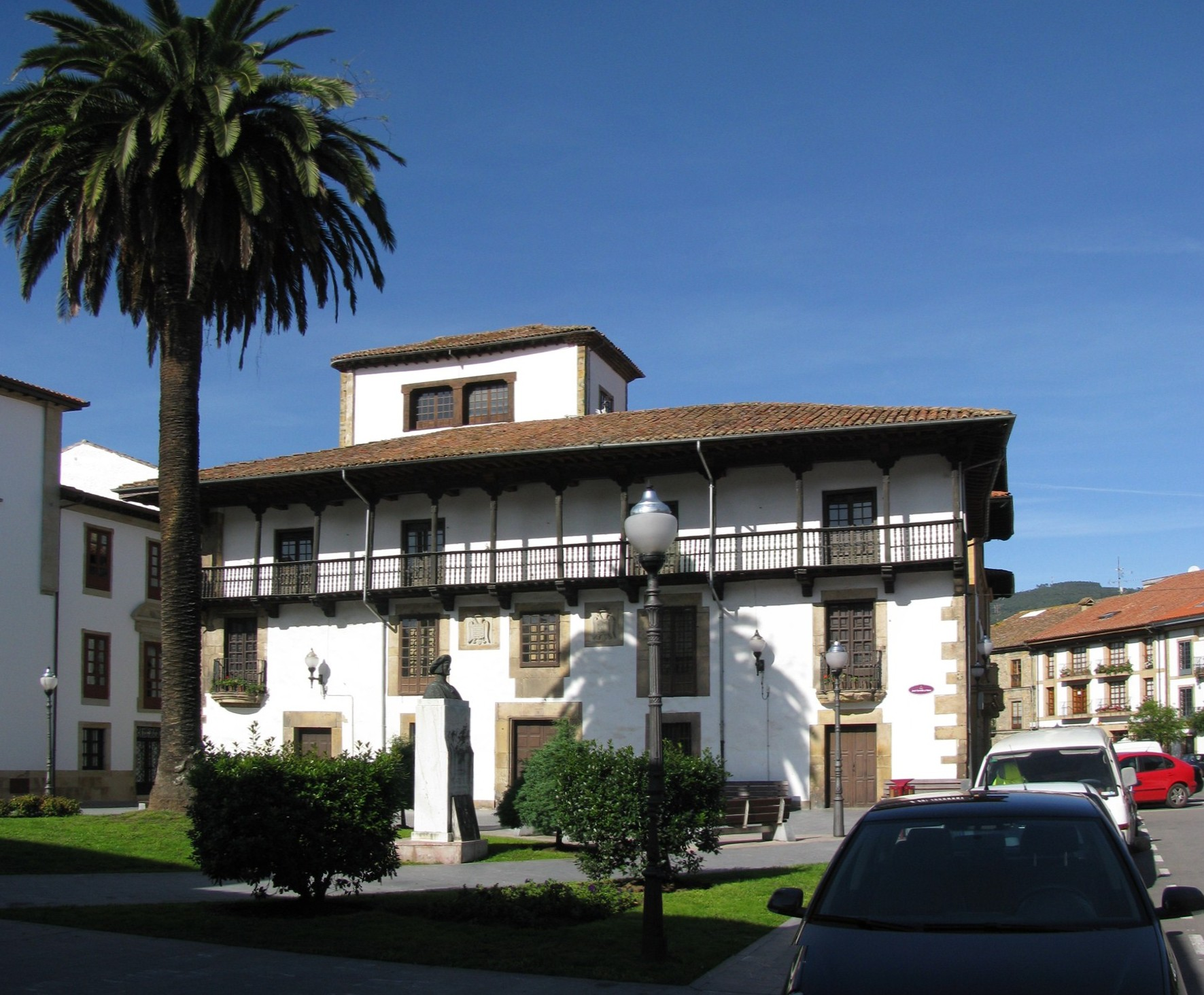
Carlos I square

Villaviciosa is situated on the central eastern coastline, and borders the Asturian municipalities of Gijón and Siero to the west, Sariego, Nava, Cabranes and Piloña to the south and Colunga to the east. The total area is 276.23 square kilometres (106.65 sq mi)

== Demographics ==
It had a population of 14,962 in 2011.

== Parroquias ==
The capital is the town of the same name. It is 2 km^{2} (0.77 sq mi) in size.

Villaviciosa includes 41 parroquias (parishes):

- Amandi
- Argüeru
- Arnín
- Arroes
- Bedriñana
- Breceña
- Camoca
- Candanal
- Carda
- Careñes
- Castiellu
- Cazanes
- Celada
- Coru
- El Bustiu
- Fuentes
- Grases
- La Llera
- La Madalena
- Llugás
- Miravalles
- Niévares
- Oles
- Pion
- Priesca
- Pueyes
- Quintes
- Quintueles
- Rales
- Rozaes
- Samartín del Vallés
- Samartín del Mar
- San Justo/San Xusto
- San Pedru Ambás
- Santa Eugenia/Santoxenia
- Seloriu
- Tazones
- Tornón
- Valdebárcena
- Villaverde
- Villaviciosa

== Notable people ==
- José Ángel Hevia Velasco, musician, was born in the town.

== Notable buildings ==
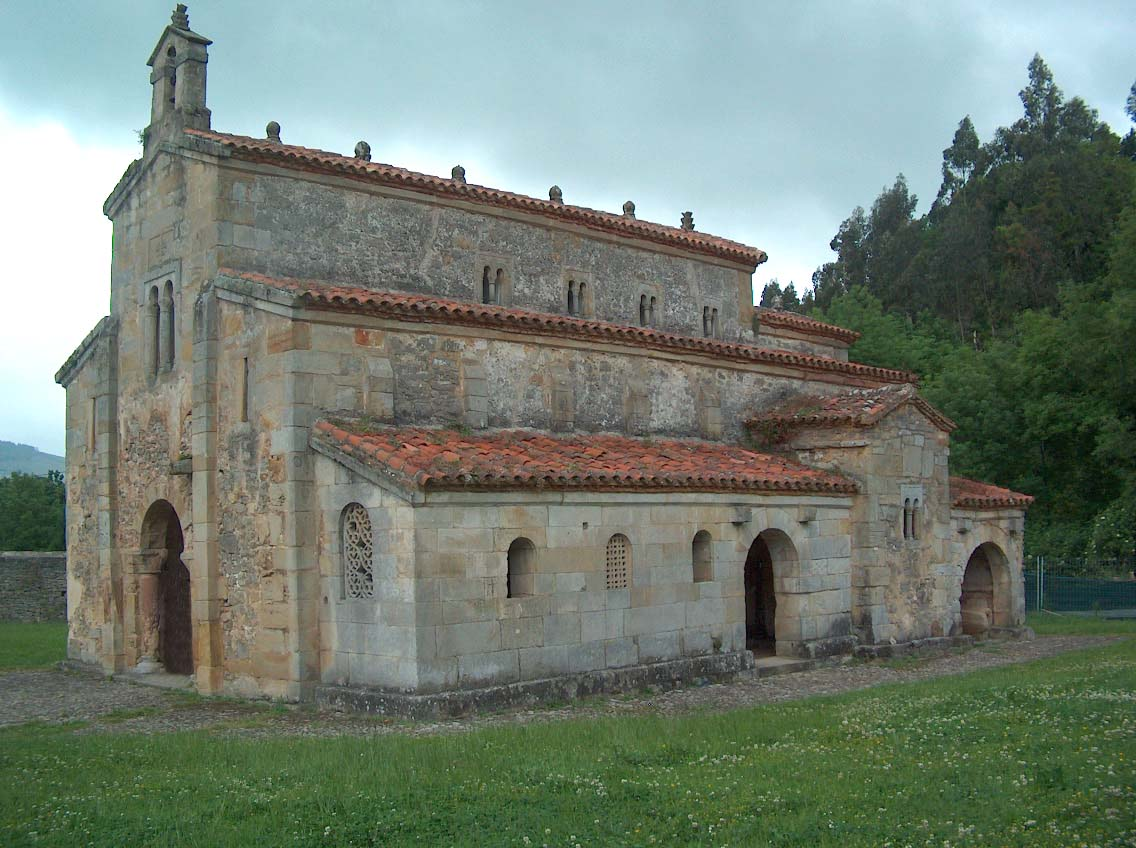
Church of San Salvador de Valdediós pre-romanesque style

- Church of San Salvador de Valdediós
- Church of Santa Eulalia de la Lloraza
- Iglesia de Santo Tomás
- Monasterio de San Martín

== See also ==
- List of municipalities in Asturias
