= Admiral Gifford (ship) =

Wooden schooner lost in 1834

History
- Name: Admiral Gifford
- Owner: Messrs Lord & Co
- Fate: Wrecked

General characteristics
- Type: Wood schooner
- Tons burthen: 43 (bm)
- Ship primary use: Transport
- Ship industry: cargo - coastal
- Ship passenger capacity: 8
- Crew: 2+

Admiral Gifford was a wooden schooner that was lost while travelling between Port Macquarie and Sydney, New South Wales, on 8 October 1834 with a cargo of grain, hides and tallow.

== Description ==
Little detail is known about Admiral Gifford. She was variously described as a colonial schooner with Walker as the master, and 43 tons, coppered and copper fastened. She was similarly described whilst on a journey from Sydney to Hobart as

A wretched little schooner called the Admiral Gifford. It was a long and tedious voyage. We were half starved when I landed

— George Clarke jnr

== Service history ==
The vessel made a number of journeys to and from New Zealand as well as Western Australia and Queensland. Trips included departing Sydney Thursday 13 November 1828, and returning Sunday 11 January 1829 with a general cargo of pork and flax as well as Mr. Love and 3 New Zealanders as passengers.

March 1829 Admiral Gifford arrived in Sydney and reported her cargo to be potatoes and flax from New Zealand. She remained in the New South Wales port until early May when she departed on another speculative voyage. It was during this voyage on 24 June 1829 that she picked up the boats and crew of the cutter Mermaid, which had struck a reef near Frankland Reef, Queensland, and later transferred them to the brig Swiftsure. However, within a few hours Swiftsure was also wrecked and both crews again forced to take to their boats. They were eventually picked up by Resource and landed at Port Raffles on 20 July.

Admiral Gifford supported the settlement of the Swan River Colony on the west coast of Australia at the time of the founding of Perth. She arrived there on 22 October 1829 carrying a cargo of spirits and corn.

In 1830 Admiral Gifford was working along the east coast of Australia between Sydney and Newcastle carrying coal, apparently under the command of Captain Taggart. It was during January 1832 that Admiral Gifford made her trip to Hobart.

During 1832 she made another journey to New Zealand and arrived back in Sydney with a cargo of 11 tons of flax from New Zealand. On this trip she left an old captain from Sydney called William Kinnard, who was accompanied by two whites and several New Zealanders on Rocky Point, where they intended to establish a sealing station. The barque Vittoria, 281 tons, S. Ashmore, belonging to R. Jones & Co., brought up 37 tons of flax, 50 pounds whalebone and 5 butts whale oil to Sydney on 12 November 1832. She also brought sad news. Vittoria, had gone to pick Kinnard's party and their bales of sealskins but found find no trace of them. Ashmore learned, to his horror, that a band of local Maori had burned Kinnard's camp, seized the men, and then slaughtered and eaten them.

On 1 November 1833 Admiral Gifford left again New Zealand for Sydney, her supercargo including Europeans Spyres, Battersy and Thomas Baker and three native New Zealanders. Her voyage back to Sydney took 12 days

The master of Admiral Gifford also had strong views on the local Aborigines

I was advised, by the master of the Admiral Gifford, not to trust the blacks who were (he said) a set of treacherous villains; as, not long ago, they had pointed their spears at him and his boat's crew, while peaceably proceeding up King's River.
But such expeditions being generally for the purpose of surprising and carrying off the native women, it cannot at all be wondered at, that the native men should endeavour to prevent the outrage. Indeed, it is quite notorious on many parts of the coast, that if a small vessel makes her appearance, the natives get out of the way as fast as possible; while if the ship be large, they come down to the beach, without mistrust or fear.

— T. B. Wilson

== Wreck ==
Little is known how Admiral Gifford sank. Fears were being raised by late October 1834

Great fears are entertained for the safety of Admiral Gifford. In order that the communication may, in the meantime, not be interrupted, Messrs. John Lord & Co. have advertised Taree to sail on Saturday.

By December no sign had been heard

There is no doubt of the melancholy loss of the schooner Admiral Gifford belonging to Mr. F. Mitchell, of Sydney, and of late employed as a trader to Port Macquarie, By a private letter from a person on that settlement, we are enabled to furnish the names of the unfortunate individuals who have, by this catastrophe, met a premature death, viz

Mrs. Thompson, wife of the Clerk of Works, and two children
A young female emigrant named Watts, who was proceeding to Sydney to be married,
A young man from London named Marriott, who emigrated about two years ago,
Mrs. Tregurtha, wife of the master,
A carpenter, late in the employ of Major Innes
with the master and four seamen,

making in all twelve human beings, who have met a premature grave.
