= Monasterio de San Martín (Villaviciosa) =

Monastery in Asturias, Spain

Monasterio de San Martín (Villaviciosa), or Iglesia de San Martín del Mar, is a monastery in San Martin, Villaviciosa, Asturias, Spain. It is near the confluence of Arroyo del Carbayin and Ria de Villaviciosa.
