= Church of Santa Eulalia de la Lloraza =

Coordinates: 43.5297°N 5.4458°W

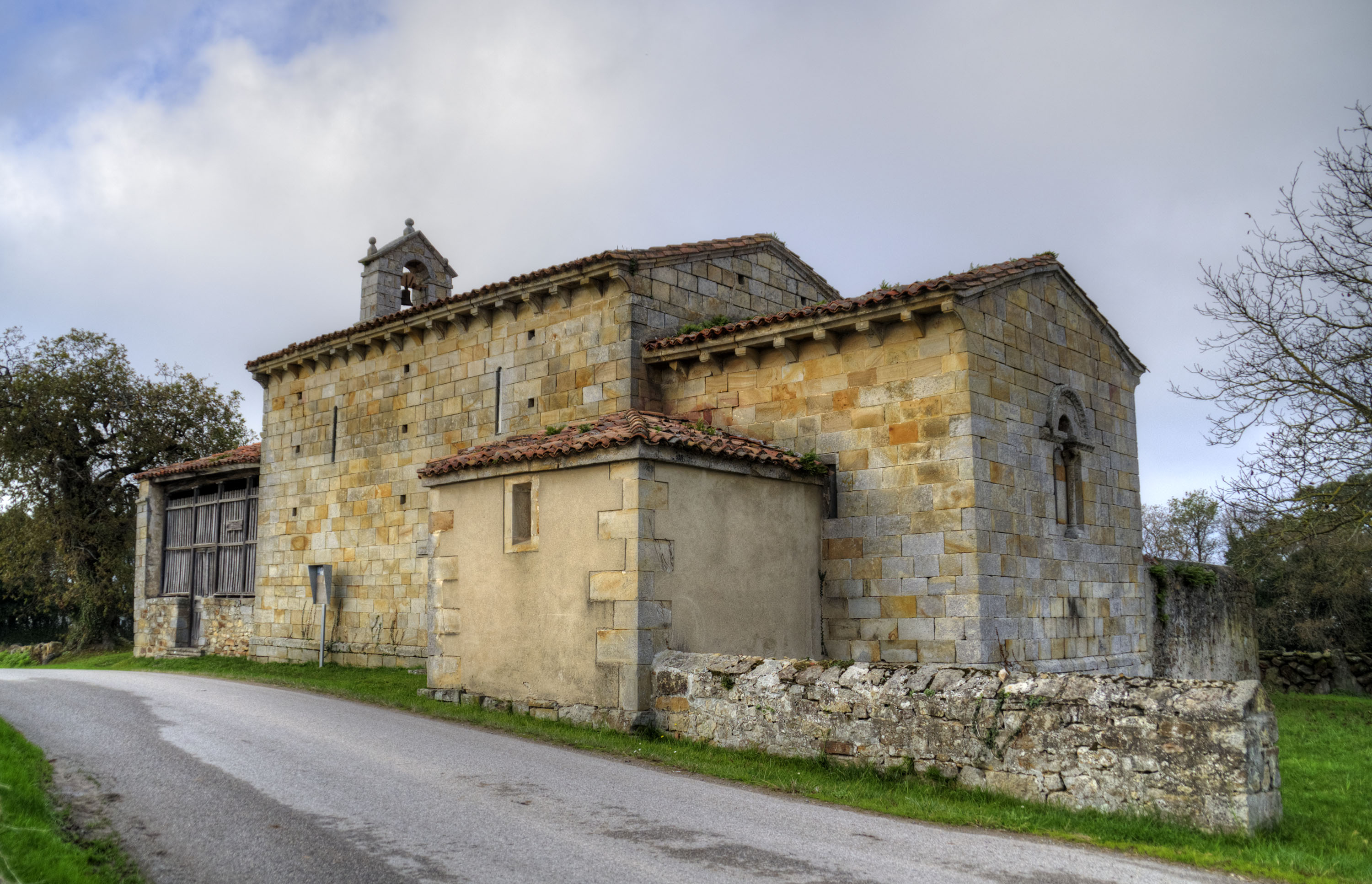
- Church of Santa Eulalia de la Lloraza
- Location: Asturias, Spain

Church of Santa Eulalia de la Lloraza (Spanish: Iglesia de Santa Eulalia de la Lloraza) is a Romanesque-style Roman Catholic church in the municipality of Villaviciosa, Asturias in the community of Asturias, Spain. The building is based in the Oles parish.

== History ==
The origins of the church are not clear, although the origin of the church may be the endowment by a leper who traveled the Camino de Santiago route which passed through the area. The church may have been funded initially by an offering of Queen Berengaria of Castile, wife of King Alfonso IX of León.

The present church dates from the thirteenth century, having undergone numerous renovations after it was damaged by arson in the Spanish Civil War. The church was restored in 1950 by Luis Menéndez Pidal y Alvarez.

== Architecture ==
The church has a nave with a squared apse. The nave can fit up to 400 people. The ensemble seen today has elements of several epochs, as it has since undergone repairs and refurbishments.

The two entrances of the building are from the early days of construction, featuring richly Romanesque decorations.

== Recognition ==
The church has been recognized as a Provincial Monument of Historical Artistic Interest.
