= Parroquia (Spain) =

Subdivision of Spain

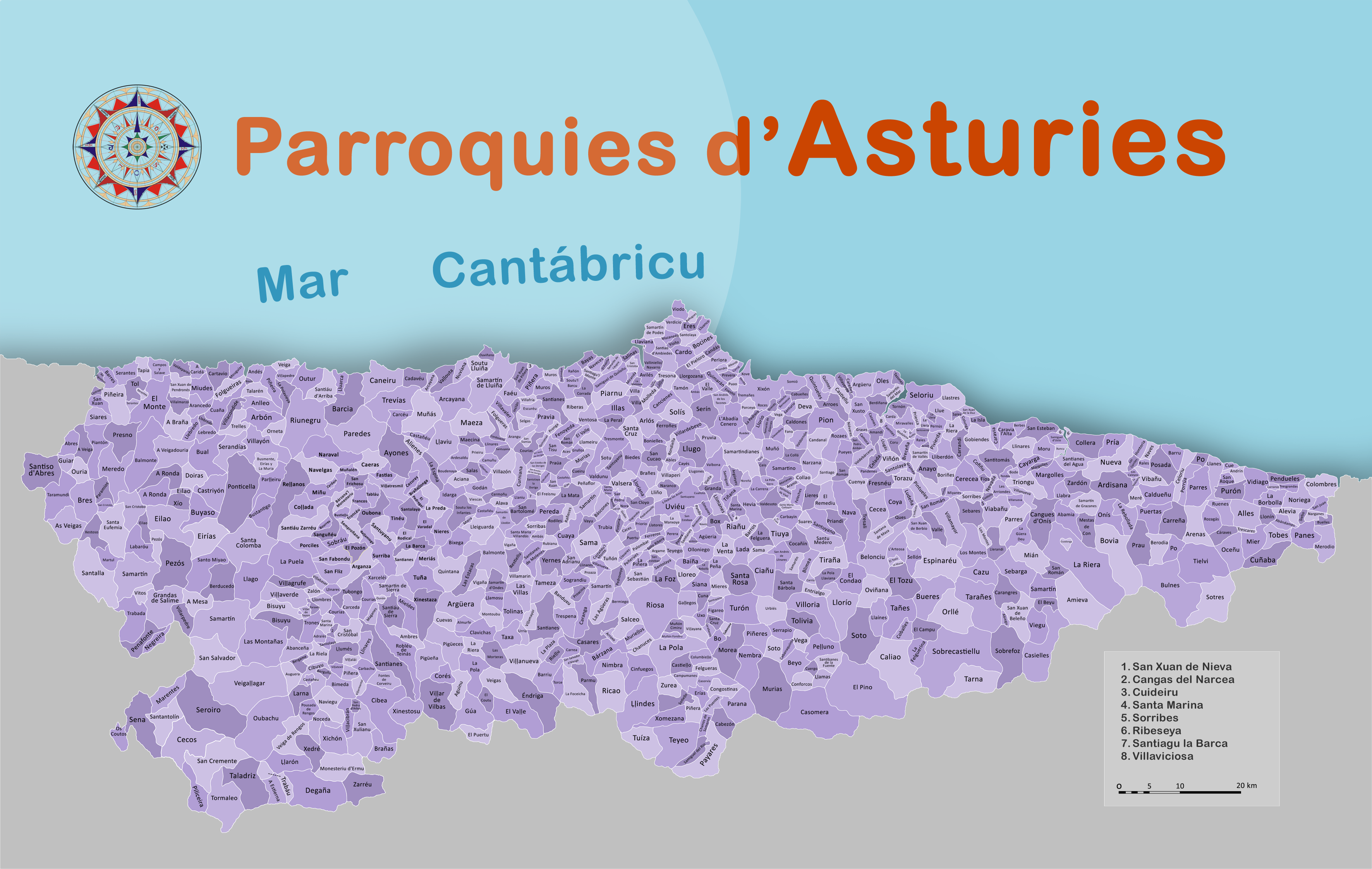
Map with all the Parishes in Asturias.

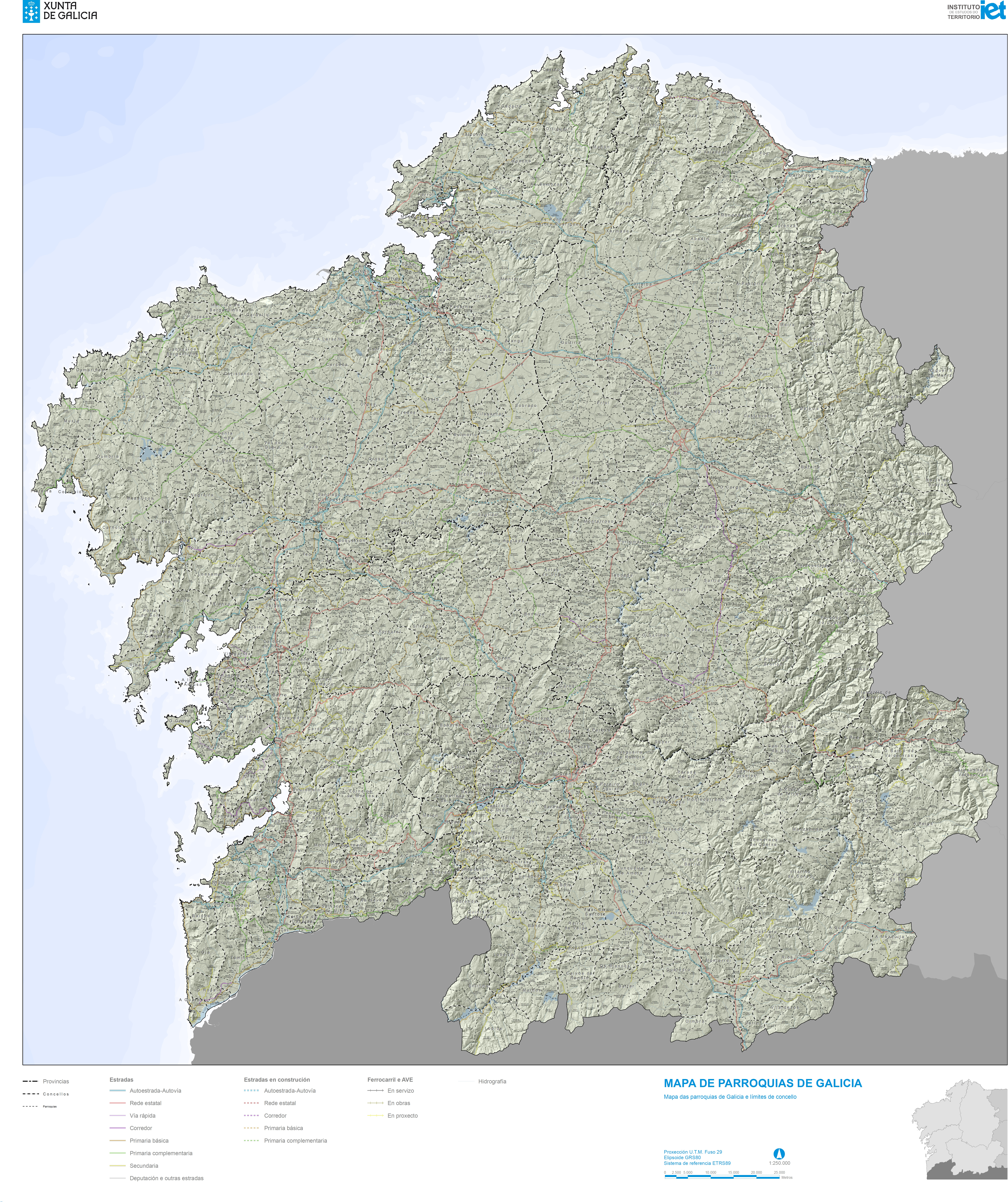
Parishes of Galicia.

A parroquia (Galician: [paˈrɔkjɐ], Asturian: [paˈrokja], Spanish: [paˈrokja]) is a population entity or parish found in the autonomous communities of Galicia and Asturias in northwestern Spain. They are entities with a territorial scope lower than municipality and have their own legal personality. They usually, but not always, coincide with the ecclesiastic divisions, as they originated on par with them.

In Galicia there are 3,771 parroquias, each comprising between three and fifteen or more villages. They developed over time as de facto entities up until the Galician Statute of Autonomy of 1981 recognized them as territorial entities below the concello (municipality).

In Asturias there are 857 parroquias integrating the 78 concejos or conceyos (municipalities) in the region.

Parroquias have their roots in the entry of the Catholic Church during the Roman and late Roman empire, similar to British parishes. From the late Roman empire on, a dispersed network of parishes and private churches emerged. Those founded the base of a religious and social interaction network, with a clear administrative role over a territorial area too, that consolidated during the 10th to 13th centuries. Since then, and in particular from 15th century on, the concept formed a very settled part of the popular consciousness and culture of Asturias and Galicia. Spanish reforms from the 18th century on tried to reduced their number, but unsuccessfully due to the deep roots they have in these territories. The creation of Spanish municipalities that started in 1835 eliminated their function. With the entrance of democracy and creation of the autonomous communities in the 1980s, Asturian and Galician parishes were recognized legally as administrative divisions.

== Law ==
=== Asturian parishes ===
"Rural parishes" are the territorial entities that compose Asturian municipalities. They have their own legal status, being this smaller and different from the municipality they belong to. Within each parish the different neighbourhoods are distinguished.

Article 6.2 of the Statute of Autonomy of Asturias recognizes its juridical personality defining this traditional entity as a "traditional form of coexistence and settlement of the Asturian population". Asturian Government passed Law 11/1986 to develop the competencies, organic rules and resources, among other aspects, of rural parishes.

Among the assigned competencies, rural parishes have the capacity to organize their community, manage and administrate their goods, in addition to all those competences that are delegated by the Asturian Government.

Parishes have and president and a "xunta" (elected board members). The president fulfils similar functions as a mayor within the parish, and "xunta" is alike a municipal plenary session. Xuntas are composed by more than two and lower than one third the council's elected members. Presidents are elected directly and given a mandate of four years.

=== Galician parishes ===
Galician parishes are an administrative division recognized as a collective entity of population lower than municipalities, or "concellos". Statute of Autonomy of Galicia of 1981 defines them as a traditional territorial entity proper of this region, with a particular coexistence and settlement history. It states they have their own legal personality and gives Galician Government the power to organize and legally regulate them. Law 5/1997 advanced in its regulation stating they are in fact autonomous local entities that have the capacity to manage their own goods.

== See also ==
- Freguesia
- Parroquia
- Civil parish
