= Banknotes of the Spanish peseta =

The banknotes of the Spanish peseta were established by the Bank of Spain in 1874–2001 until the introduction of the euro. From 1940 the banknotes were produced by the Royal Mint (Fábrica Nacional de Moneda y Timbre). In about the same year the inscription "El Banco de España" on both sides of the banknotes was temporarily changed to "Banco de España", as the definite article "el" was dropped. There is no significant legislation on the copyright of the Spanish peseta banknotes and their reproductions are permitted, except for advertising.

== First Republic ==
Obverse	Reverse	Value	Dimensions (mm)	Description	Emission date
		25	105x67	Allegorical children bearers at left and right of center	1 July 1874
		50	146x80	Rafael Esteve at left	1 July 1874
		100	170x78	Juan de Herrera at left, El Escorial at center	1 July 1874
		500	174x99	Francisco Goya at right	1 July 1874
		1000	187x118	Minerva at left, Alonso Cano at right	1 July 1874

== Kingdom ==
Obverse	Reverse	Value	Dimensions (mm)	Description	Emission date
		25			1 January 1875
		50			1 January 1875
		100			1 January 1875
		500			1 January 1875
		1000			1 January 1875
		100		Lope de Vega at left	1 July 1876
		500		Lope de Vega at left	1 July 1876
		1000		Lope de Vega at left, Spaniard with Indian maiden at center, Liberty at lower right	1 July 1876
		50		Pedro Calderón de la Barca at right	1 January 1878
		100		Garcilaso de la Vega at left	1 January 1878
		250		Fernando de Herrera at left	1 January 1878
		500		Pablo de Céspedes at left	1 January 1878
		1000		Miguel de Cervantes at left	1 January 1878
		50		Pedro Rodríguez, Conde de Campomanes at left	1 April 1880
		100		Francisco de Quevedo at left	1 April 1880
		500		Claudio Coello at left	1 April 1880
		1000		Bartolomé Murillo at left	1 April 1880
		25	112x68	Geography lesson painting, Spanish coat of arms on the reverse	1 January 1884
		50	123x78	Juan Álvarez Mendizábal at right, Woman watering an eagle on the reverse	1 January 1884
		100	133x87	Juan Álvarez Mendizábal at right, numerals on the reverse	1 January 1884
		500	144x95	Juan Álvarez Mendizábal at right, Spanish coat of arms on the reverse	1 January 1884
		1000	152x103	Juan Álvarez Mendizábal at center, key, dog and safe on the reverse	1 January 1884
		25	112x74	Ramón de Santillán at center, numerals on the reverse	1 July 1884
		50	120x80	Juan Bravo Murillo at center, numerals on the reverse	1 July 1884
		100	145x85	Alejandro Mon y Menéndez at center, steam locomotive on the reverse	1 July 1884
		500	147x100	José Moñino, 1st Count of Floridablanca at right, numerals on the reverse	1 July 1884
		1000	166x104	Zenón de Somodevilla, 1st Marqués de la Ensenada at left	1 July 1884
		25	100x75	Francisco Goya at center	1 October 1886
		50	120x80	Francisco Goya at right	1 October 1886
		100	142x84	Francisco Goya at left	1 October 1886
		500	146x100	Francisco Goya at left	1 October 1886
		1000	165x103	Francisco Goya seated at right	1 October 1886
		25	110x74	Francisco Goya at center, Croesus effigy on the reverse	1 June 1889
		50	120x80	Francisco Goya at right	1 June 1889
		100	142x84	Francisco Goya at right	1 June 1889
		25	110x70	Gaspar Melchor de Jovellanos at left	24 July 1893
		50	124x77	Gaspar Melchor de Jovellanos at left	24 July 1893
		100	137x83	Gaspar Melchor de Jovellanos at left	24 July 1893
		1000	168x105	François Cabarrus at left, Charles III of Spain effigy on the reverse	1 May 1895
		50	124x77	Gaspar Melchor de Jovellanos at left	2 January 1898
		100	137x83	Gaspar Melchor de Jovellanos at left	24 June 1898
		25	110x55	Francisco de Quevedo at left	17 May 1899
		50	120x63	Francisco de Quevedo at left	25 November 1899
		100	132x72	Francisco de Quevedo at left; Athena effigy on the reverse	1 May 1900
		50	137x80	Diego Velázquez at left, Velázquez painting Apollo in the Forge of Vulcan on the reverse	30 November 1902
		100			1903, 1905
		500			1 October 1903
		25			1 January 1904, not issued
		50		José Echegaray at left	19 March 1905
		25			24 September 1906
		50			24 September 1906
		100			30 June 1906
		500			28 January 1907
		1000		Mercury with globe on shoulder at left, shield with castle at lower left, shield with rampant lion at lower right	10 May 1907
		25		Alhambra on the reverse	15 July 1907
		50		Cathedral of Burgos on the reverse	15 July 1907
		100		Cathedral of Seville on the reverse	15 July 1907
		500		Alcázar de Segovia on the reverse	15 July 1907
		1000		Royal Palace of Madrid on the reverse	15 July 1907
		25		José Quintana at left	1 December 1908 (not issued)
		5		Ferdinand VI of Spain	1914 (not issued)
		1000		Conjoined portraits of Alfonso XIII of Spain and Victoria Eugenie of Battenberg at left	23 May 1915 (not issued)
		100		Philip II of Spain at left, monastery of El Escorial at lower center; retreat of Philip II of Spain on the reverse	1 July 1925
		500		Francisco Jiménez de Cisneros at left	23 January 1925 (not issued)
		1000		Charles V at right, gorgon head at top center	1 July 1925
		25		Francis Xavier at left; Francis Xavier baptizing Indians on the reverse	12 October 1926
		50		Alfonso XIII of Spain at left; founding of Buenos Aires on the reverse	17 May 1927
		500		Lions Court at Alhambra at center, Isabella I of Castile at right	24 July 1927
		25		Pedro Calderón de la Barca at right	15 August 1928
		50		Prado Museum at lower left and center, Diego Velázquez at right; painting The Surrender of Breda on the reverse	15 August 1928
		100		Miguel de Cervantes at left; painting of Don Quijote by Pidal on the reverse	15 August 1928
		500		Cathedral of Toledo at lower left, Francisco Jiménez de Cisneros above	15 August 1928
		1000		Cathedral of Seville at lower left, San Fernando at right; painting of King receiving communion by Alejandro Ferrant y Fischermans on the reverse	15 August 1928

== Second Republic and Civil War ==
Obverse	Reverse	Value	Dimensions (mm)	Description	Emission date
		25	112x73	Vicente López y Portaña at right; Portaña's painting Music on the reverse	25 April 1931
		50	122x78	Eduardo Rosales at left; Rosales' painting The Death of Lucretia on the reverse	25 April 1931
		100	131x83	Gonzalo Fernández de Córdoba at left; The Two Caudillos painting by José Casado del Alisal on the reverse	25 April 1931
		500	142x87	Juan Sebastián de Elcano at left; Elias Salaverria's painting Disembarkation on the reverse	25 April 1931
		1000		José Zorrilla at upper left; Zorrilla reading his poems at gathering on the reverse	25 April 1931
		25		Joaquín Sorolla at left; Sorollas' painting Oxen taking the boat out on the reverse	31 August 1936
		50		Santiago Ramón y Cajal at right, Ramón y Cajal monument on the reverse	22 July 1935
		500		Hernán Cortés at left, his palace in Mexico at lower right center; O. Graeff's painting of Cortés scuttling his ships on the reverse	7 January 1935
		5	89x50	Republic allegory at left	1935
		10	101x61	Republic allegory at right	1935
		100	129x89	Lady of Elche at left, Palmeral of Elche on the reverse	11 March 1938 (not issued)
		100	127x69	Numerals on both sides	15 August 1938 (not issued)
		5000	161x97	Mariano Fortuny at right; Fortuny's picture La Vicaría on the reverse	11 June 1938 (not issued)
		50 cent.	78x37	Republic allegory	1937
		1	86x46	Nike of Samothrace at left; La Cibeles Fountain in Madrid on the reverse	1937
		2	86x46	Republic allegory, Toledo Bridge in Madrid on the reverse	1938
		5		Spanish coat of arms on upper right	21 November 1936
		10		Spanish coat of arms on upper right	21 November 1936
		25		Soldier effigy on the reverse	21 November 1936
		50		Women effigies on the reverse	21 November 1936
		100		Cathedral of Burgos on the reverse	21 November 1936
		500		New Cathedral of Salamanca on the reverse	21 November 1936
		1000		Puente de Alcántara in the foreground and Alcázar of Toledo in the background on the reverse	21 November 1936
		1	72x52	House of Bourbon Spanish royal family coat of arms (1759-1931) at left	12 October 1937
		2		Burgos Cathedral at left	12 October 1937
		5		Commerce allegory at right	18 July 1937
		25		Christopher Columbus at left; Columbus in the New World on the reverse	18 July 1937 (not issued)
		100		Francisco Javier Castaños, 1st Duke of Bailén at right; Battle of Bailén on the reverse	18 July 1937 (not issued)
		1000		Charles V at center	18 July 1937 (not issued)
		1	72x52	Francoist Spain coat of arms at left	28 February 1938
		1		Francoist Spain coat of arms at left	30 April 1938
		2		Burgos Cathedral at left	30 April 1938
		5		Numerals	10 August 1938
		25		Numerals, Giralda on the reverse	20 May 1938
		50		Numerals, Walls of Ávila on the reverse	20 May 1938
		100		Numerals, House of Cordón (Burgos) on the reverse	20 May 1938
		500		Numerals, Santiago de Compostela Cathedral on the reverse	20 May 1938
		1000		Numerals, César Álvarez Dumont's painting Heroic combat in the pulpit of the church of San Agustín de Zaragoza in the second siege of 1809 on the reverse	20 May 1938

== Francoist dictatorship and 1978 democracy ==
Obverse	Reverse	Value	Dimensions (mm)	Description	Emission date
		25		Juan de Herrera at left, Patio de Evangelistas at right	9 January 1940
		50		Menéndez Pelayo at left	9 January 1940
		100		Christopher Columbus at center	9 January 1940
		500		John of Austria at right; Battle of Lepanto with old ships on the reverse	9 January 1940
		1000		Bartolomé Murillo at center; Murillo painting Children Counting Money on the reverse	9 January 1940
		1		Hernán Cortés on horseback at right	1 June 1940
		1		Sailing ship Santa María at center	4 September 1940
		5		Alcázar of Segovia at right	4 September 1940
		500		Conde de Orgaz by El Greco at right	21 October 1940
		1000		Charles V at left	21 October 1940
		1		Ferdinand II of Aragon at left; Christopher Columbus landing on the reverse	21 May 1943
		5		Isabella I of Castile at left; Christopher Columbus with his men at center	13 February 1943
		1		Isabella I of Castile at left	15 June 1945
		5		Isabella I of Castile and Christopher Columbus at left; Spaniards fighting Moors on the reverse	15 June 1945
		25		Álvaro Flórez Estrada at left; view of Pola de Somiedo on the reverse	19 February 1946
		100		Francisco Goya at right; The Sun Shade by Goya on the reverse	19 February 1946
		500		Francisco de Vitoria at right; University of Salamanca on the reverse	19 February 1946
		1000		Luis Vives at right; cloister at college in Valencia on the reverse	19 February 1946
		5		Seneca the Younger (the Pseudo-Seneca bust) at right	12 April 1947
		1		Lady of Elche at right	19 June 1948
		5		Juan Sebastián Elcano at left	5 March 1948
		100		Francisco Bayeu y Subías at left; Goya's El Cacharrero on the reverse	2 May 1948
		1000		Ramón de Santillán at right; Goya's El Bebedor on the reverse	4 November 1949
		1		Don Quijote at right, armour, spear, shield, sword, helmet and books on the reverse	19 November 1951
		5		Jaime Balmes at left	16 August 1951
		50		Santiago Rusiñol at right; Rusiñol's Jardines de Aranjuez on the reverse	31 December 1951
		500		Mariano Benlliure at left; sculpture by Benlliure on the reverse	15 October 1951
		1000		Joaquín Sorolla at center; Sorolla's painting La fiesta del naranjo on the reverse	31 December 1951
		1		Álvaro de Bazán, 1st Marquis of Santa Cruz at right	22 July 1953
		100		Julio Romero de Torres at center; La Fuensanta by Torres on the reverse	7 April 1953
		5		Alfonso X of Castile at right; library and museum building in Madrid on the reverse	22 July 1954
		25		Isaac Albeniz at left; patio scene of the Lion's Court of Alhambra on the reverse	22 July 1954
		500		Ignacio Zuloaga at center; painting by Zuloaga View of Toledo on the reverse	22 July 1954
		1000		Catholic Monarchs at center, arms on the reverse	29 November 1957
		100		Gustavo Adolfo Bécquer at center right; woman with parasol at center, Cathedral of Sevilla at left on the reverse	19 November 1965
		1000		Isidore of Seville at left	19 October 1965
		100		Manuel de Falla at right; gardens of Alhambra at left center on the reverse	17 November 1970
		500		Jacinto Verdaguer at right; view of Mt. Canigó with village of Vignolas d'Oris on the reverse	23 July 1971
		1000		Commemorative issue -Centennial of Banco de España becoming the only Issuing Bank (1874-1974). José Echegaray at right; Bank of Spain in Madrid on the reverse	17 September 1971
		5000		Charles III of Spain at right; Museum of Prado at left center on the reverse	6 February 1976
		200	120x65	Leopoldo Alas at right	16 September 1980
		500	129x70	Rosalia de Castro at right	23 October 1979
		1000	138x76	Benito Pérez Galdós at right; rocks, mountains and map of Canary Islands on the reverse	23 October 1979
		2000	147x79	Juan Ramón Jiménez at right; Villa de la Rosa at left center on the reverse	22 July 1980
		5000	156x85	Fleur-de-lis at center, Juan Carlos I at right; Royal Palace of Madrid at left on the reverse	23 October 1979
		10,000	165x85	Juan Carlos I at right; Felipe, Prince of Asturias at left, view of the Escorial at center on the reverse	24 September 1985
		1000	130x65	Hernán Cortes and a globe; Francisco Pizarro on the reverse in vertical format	12 October 1992
		2000	147x79	José Celestino Mutis observing flower at right; Real Jardín Botánico de Madrid and title page of Mutis' work on the reverse in vertical format	24 April 1992
		2000	138x68	Modified portrait of José Celestino Mutis observing flower in vertical format; Real Jardín Botánico de Madrid and title page of Mutis' work on the reverse	24 April 1992 (1996)
		5000	146x71	Christopher Columbus at right; astrolabe at lower center on the reverse in vertical format	12 October 1992
		10,000	154x74	Juan Carlos I at right, Casa de América at lower center; Jorge Juan above astronomical navigation diagram on the reverse in vertical format	12 October 1992
