= Álvaro Flórez Estrada =

Spanish politician

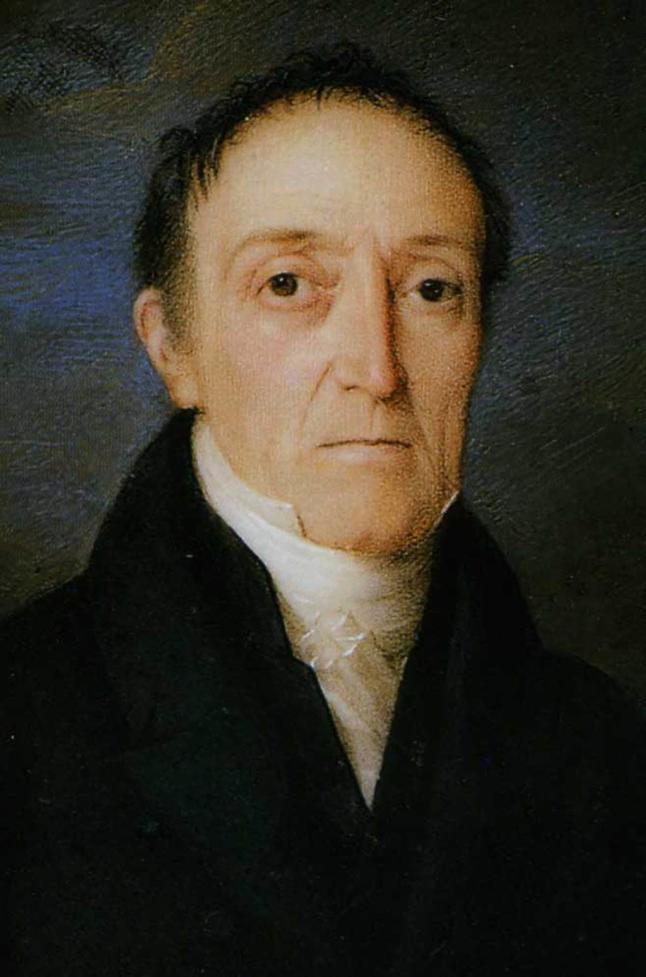
Álvaro Flórez Estrada

Álvaro Flórez Estrada (Pola de Somiedo, Asturias, 1765 – Noreña, Asturias, 1853), a Spanish economist, lawyer and politician. According to Inglis Palgrave's Dictionary of Political Economy, Estrada is "considered the most distinguished Spanish economist of the first half of [the 19th] century."

== Biography ==
He studied humanities and then Law at the University of Oviedo and moved to Madrid, where he became a magistrate.

== Early career ==
At thirty he was appointed treasurer-general of the Kingdom by Manuel Godoy, a position that, after some time he resigned from, considering his work incompatible with the liberal convictions he professed. Though he retired to Pola de Somiedo, the General Board of the Principality named him its attorney general in 1798.

When the uprising of Asturias against Napoleon took place in 1808, he sensed that "the fight against the invader does not make sense unless it is at the same time a political revolution," drafted the Proclamation of the Junta, and also the Charter of the latter, asking for help from the King of England. When the meeting was dissolved by the Marquis of La Romana, Flórez Estrada escaped to Seville to denounce what had happened at the Central Board. He lived in Seville and Cádiz, drafting a liberal, albeit monarchical, Constitution. He later left for London, where he presented his ideology in the 1810 publications Introduction to the History of the Revolution in Spain and Impartial Examination of the Dissensions of America with Spain.

In 1812 he was deputy of the Cortes de Cádiz. In Cádiz he founded a liberal newspaper, and in 1813 he was appointed Military Intendant in Andalusia. Soon after, he left his post and devoted himself to the study of history, languages and economics.

== Later career ==
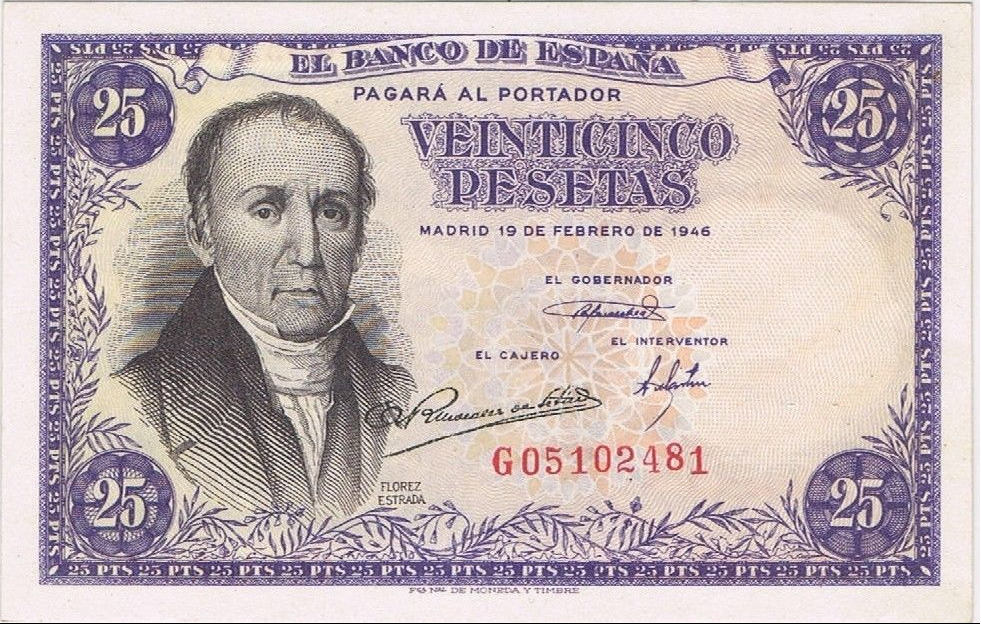
Álvaro Flórez Estrada on the 25 pesetas banknote of 1946

His participation in the Cortes of Cádiz and Masonic societies forced him to flee Spain when, in 1814, Fernando VII returned and threatened to condemn him to death, leading him to exile himself in London. He was associated with the Comuneros, a splinter group from Freemasonry, and used the name "Astur." His stay in London allowed him to connect with English economists (David Ricardo, James Mill, and Adam Smith), introducing their ideas in Spain. He also went to Rome to offer Charles IV restitution on the throne if he accepted a constitutional monarchy. In 1818 he wrote a transcendental representation to the king in defense of the Cortes, which was printed in London in 1819 and which, published in Spain, contributed to renewing the enthusiasm for the constitutional regime and prepared the way for Rafael Riego to decide on his military uprising on 1 January 1820, in Cabezas de San Juan. After the Constitution was proclaimed again, he returned to Spain. He tried to carry out some of his theoretical economic and industrial plans and was elected deputy to Cortes Asturias. In Congress he opposed the project to abolish Patriotic Societies, because he always defended freedom: "freedom of printing, political freedom, civil liberty, freedom of customs, freedom of trade, freedom to speak and freedom of all will be his eternal and sweeter sing "1, was written of him. Although without representation in the Cortes, he wrote in 1822 with Francisco Martínez Marina, the first draft of the Spanish Penal Code. On 3 March 1823 he was appointed Minister of State. But the following month the arrival of the "One Hundred Thousand Sons of St. Louis" forced him to embark in Gibraltar to go into exile once more in London.

During this expatriation, which lasted ten years, he published economics books, such as Efectos producidos en Europa por la baja en el producto de las minas de plata,(European effects from the decline in silver mine production), Examen de la crisis comercial de Inglaterra (Examination of the English commercial crisis) and Curso completo de economía política (Complete course of political economy).

He returned to Spain on the death of King Fernando VII, engaging again in politics. He represented Asturias in all the legislatures from 1834 to 1840. He defends the concept of Juan Álvarez Mendizábal's Ecclesiastical confiscations, although not his methods. He published, in this respect, his work On the alienation of the national goods (1836). He wrote several more books on economics, such as Elements of Political Economy, a textbook studied throughout the Spanish language for years.

In 1846 he was appointed life senator and, aged eighty-seven years old, he died in the Miraflores de Noreña palace on 16 December 1853.

== Memorials ==
His name is inscribed on the monument that Oviedo has dedicated to Asturian economists and financiers. The Museum of Fine Arts of Asturias, has a small portrait of him by an anonymous Englishman.

The 25 pesetas bank notes that the Bank of Spain printed in 1946 has his portrait on the obverse and his manor house on Somiedo on the reverse.

== Bibliography ==
- Fundación Álvaro Flórez Estrada
- Obras de Álvaro Flórez Estrada en la Biblioteca Virtual Miguel de Cervantes
