= View and Plan of Toledo =

Painting by El Greco

- Vista y plano de Toledo (Spanish)
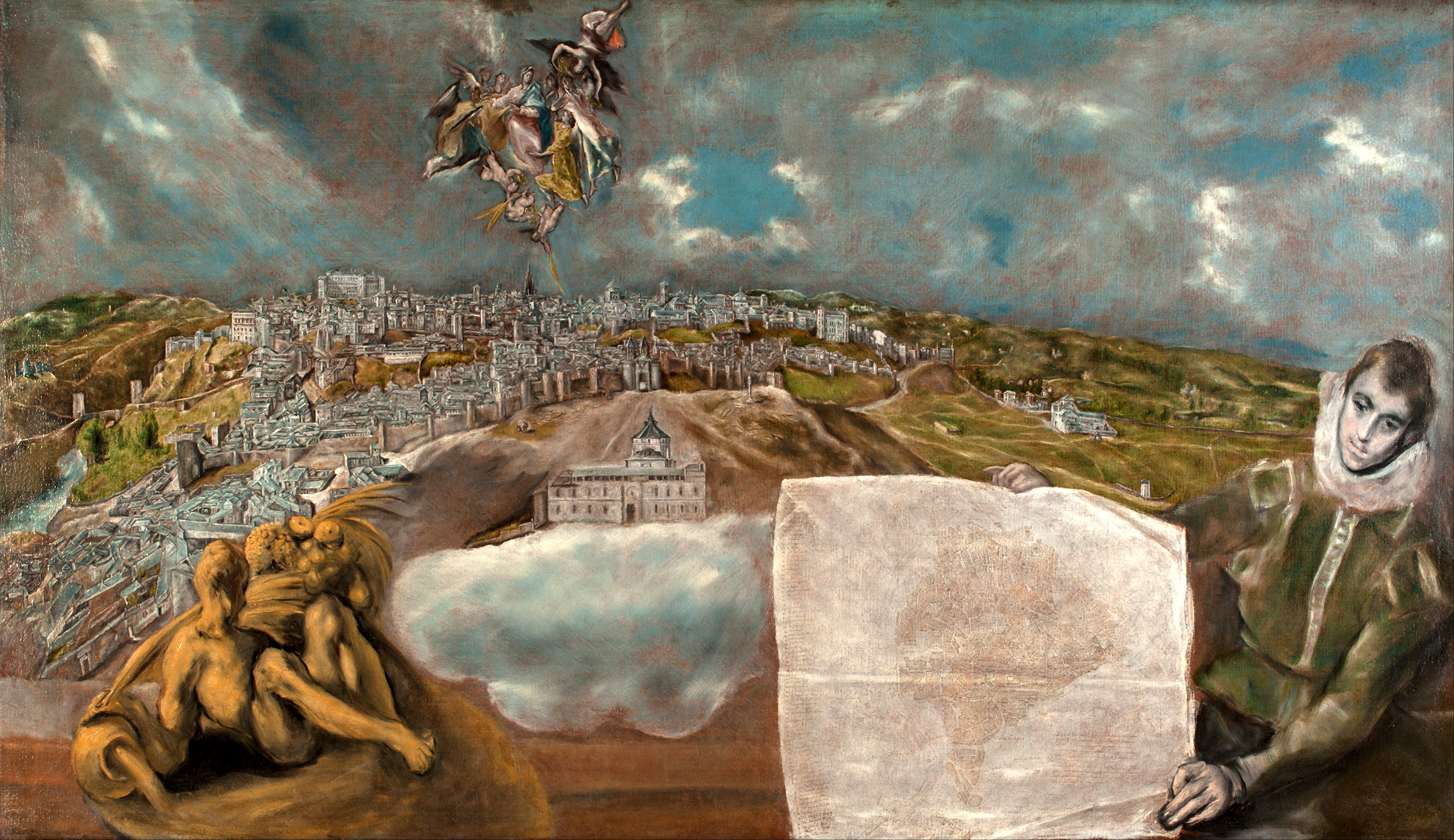
- Artist: El Greco
- Year: 1608
- Medium: oil on canvas
- Dimensions: 132 cm × 228 cm (52 in × 90 in)
- Location: Museum of El Greco; Toledo

View and Plan of Toledo (Spanish: Vista y plano de Toledo, ca. 1608) is a landscape painting by El Greco. The image is notable for its juxtaposition of the view of Toledo with the trompe l'oeil map of the city's streets. In the composition, El Greco also included an allegory of the Tagus River, a scene of the Virgin Mary placing a chasuble on Saint Ildefonsus, and an elevation of the Tavera Hospital floating on a cloud. It was probably originally commissioned by Pedro Salazar de Mendoza and is currently preserved in the El Greco Museum in Toledo, Spain.

== Analysis ==
View and Plan of Toledo symbolically displays the sanctity and the Spanish history of Toledo. The painting can thus be interpreted in light of the propaganda campaigns the city of Toledo began to undertake in the late sixteenth century in attempt to convince Philip II and his court to return to Toledo from Madrid. At the same time, the painting has decorative use and can be considered part of the paintings El Greco and his studio were producing toward the end of his life for the domestic market. These narrative works, including for example Laocoön and Saint Joseph and the Christ Child, use the landmarks of the city as a backdrop to a religious or historical scene.

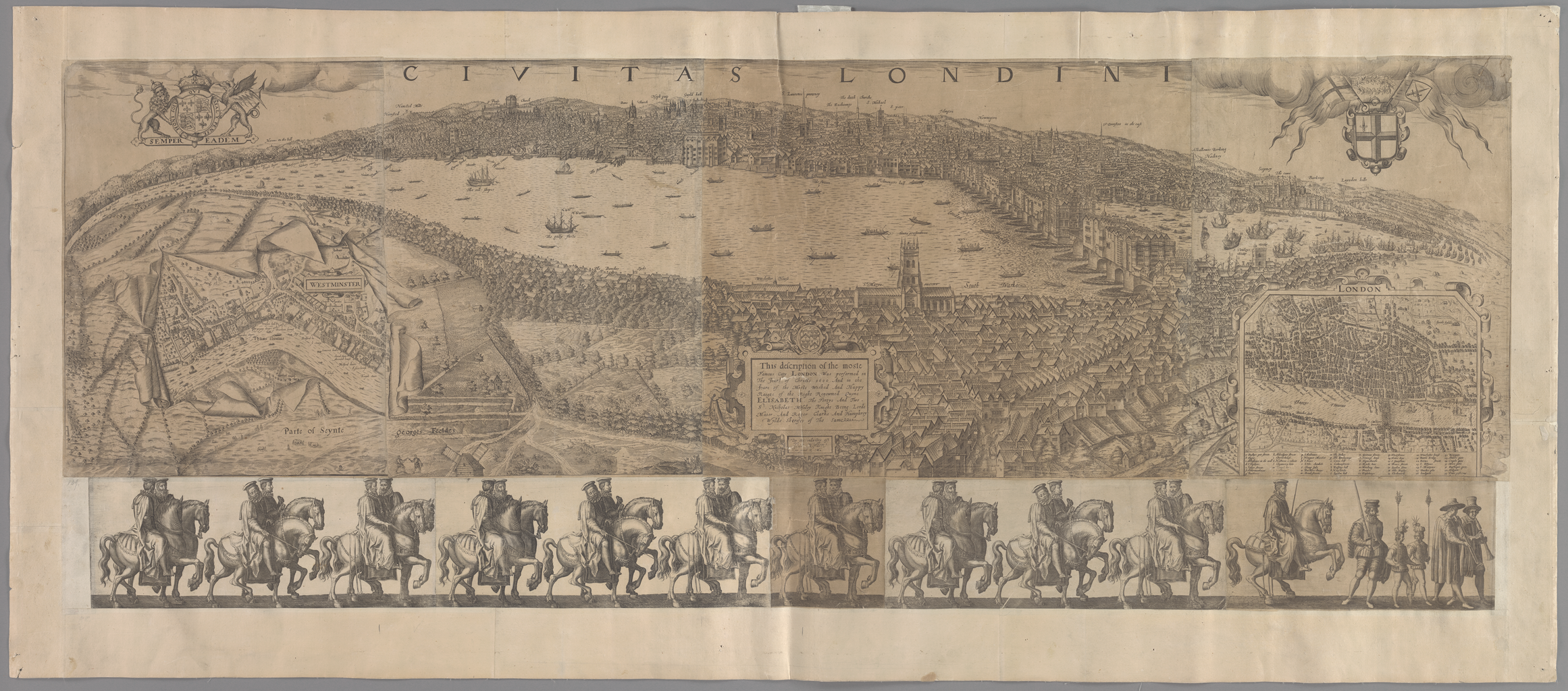
John Norden, Civitas Londini (1600), engraving, National Library of Sweden

The painting takes a view of Toledo from the north looking southward. This could be interpreted as a view from the tower of the Tavera Hospital or from the gallows near the cemetery. Many major landmarks of the city are recognizable, including the Bisagra Gate, the Toledo Cathedral, the Alcázar de Toledo and Saint Martin's Bridge. It is possible the view of Toledo was influenced by a map of London by John Norden in the collection of Pedro Salazar de Mendoza, which like the painting presents a panoramic view of the city alongside a floor plan map.

The map of Toledo in the lower right of the painting is oriented with the south side on the top. On the left of the map is a list of the major institutions of the city with corresponding numbers to their location in the city. In the lower right of the map is an inscription which discusses the placement of the Tavera Hospital and the Virgin and Saint Ildefonsus in the composition:

Ha sido forçoso poner el hospital de Don Joan Tavera en forma de modelo porque no solo venia a cubrir la puerta de Visagra mas subia el cimborrio o copula de manera que sobrepujava la çiudad y asi una vez puesto como modelo y movido de su lugar me pareçio mostrar la haz antes que otra parte y en lo demas de como viene con la ciudad se vera en la planta.
Tambien en la historia de nra señora que trahe la casulla a S. Illefonso para su ornato y hazer las figuras grandes me he valido en çierta manera de ser cuerpos çelestiales como vemos en las luçes que vistas de lexos por pequenas que sean nos pareçen grandes.
It was necessary to place the Hospital of Don Juan Tavera in the form of a model because, not only did it cover the Puerta de Visagra [Bisagra], but the dome or cupola rose up over the city and so once placed as a model and moved from its location it seemed to me to show the façade better than elsewhere, and as to how it fits within the city, this can be seen in the plan
Also in the story of Our Lady bringing the chasuble to Saint Ildefonso, in order to adorn him and to make the figures large, I have in a certain way taken advantage of their being celestial bodies, as in the case of lights, which when viewed from afar however small they may appear to be large.

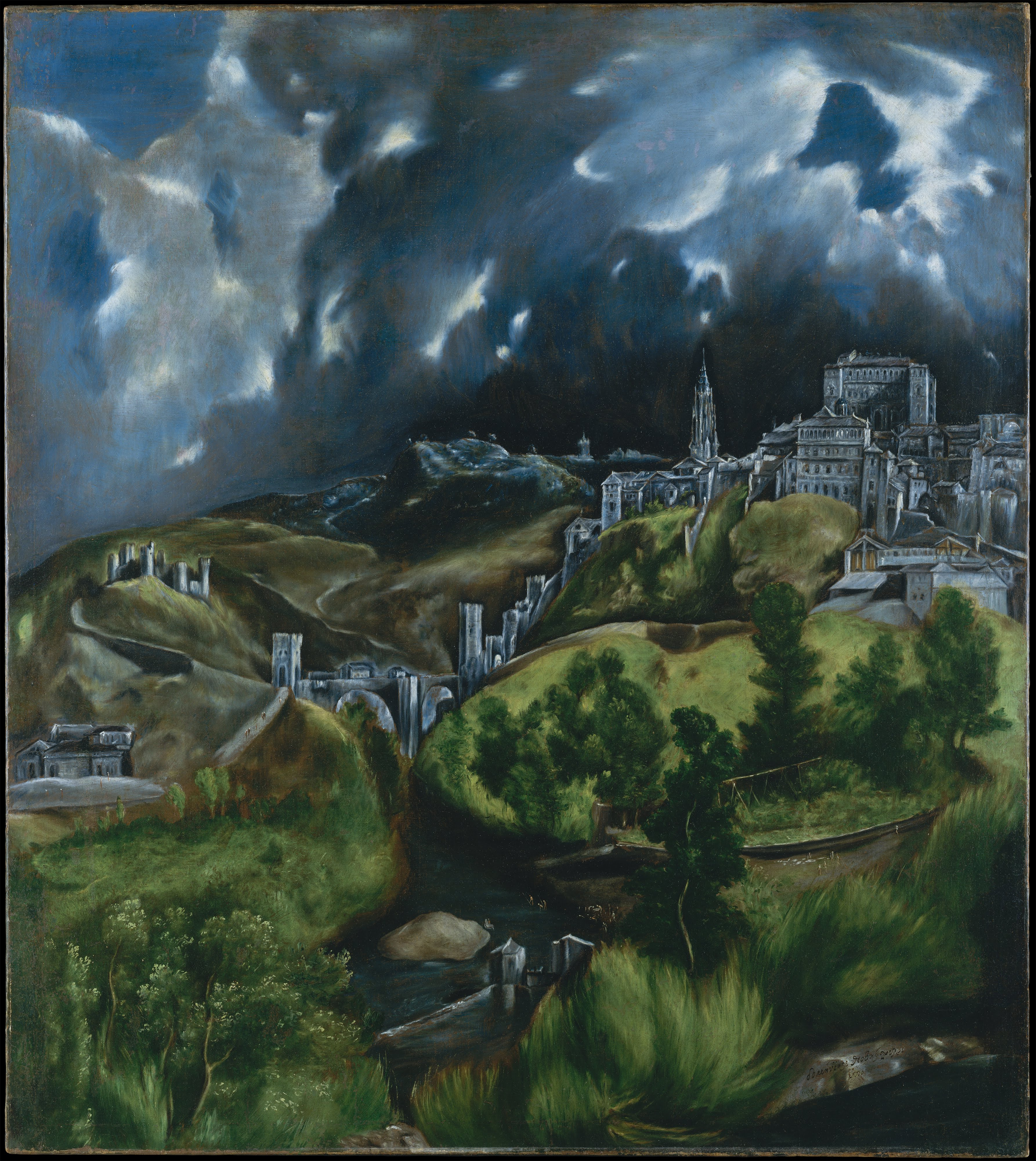
El Greco, View of Toledo, 1596-1600, oil on canvas, Metropolitan Museum of Art, New York City.

Placing the Tavera Hospital on a cloud to move it out of the way of the view of the Bisagra Gate is a strategy El Greco used in other of his landscapes. On the left of the Metropolitan Museum of Art's View of Toledo, across the Alcántara bridge and beneath the Castle of San Servando, is a small cluster of buildings on a cloud-like form. El Greco may have intended these to be the Agalinese monastery, where Saint Ildefonsus went on retreat. Pedro Salazar de Mendoza owned both View of Toledo and View and Plan of Toledo, which may explain this commonality.

On the lower left of View and Plan of Toledo is a reclining allegory of the Tagus River, holding a cornucopia and a vessel pouring water. It references both Toledo's agricultural economy and fertility. At the same time, it suggests Toledo's antiquity, the roots of which can be traced to Roman times.

== Attribution ==
The painting has a long-standing attribution to El Greco which is supported by most scholars. There has been some speculation that the plan of Toledo was penned on the surface of the painting by El Greco's son Jorge Manuel. Guillermo Santacruz Sánchez de Rojas argued that the entire painting is by Jorge Manuel: He claims El Greco would have been too elderly to have produced this painting, as creating preparatory sketches of the city and measurements for the plan would have required significant walking and climbing.

The origin of the map of Toledo has been the subject of some debate. Most scholarship, significantly that of Richard Kagan and Fernando Marías, indicates that the map was drafted by El Greco himself before it was drawn onto the painting. Because most of the engineers capable of producing maps were concentrated in Seville at the Casa de Contratación, some scholars, including Juan Cervera, argue El Greco would have been the only person in Toledo with the skills to produce such a plan. These arguments are supported by a surviving letter from El Greco's time in Venice indicating he knew the luxury mapmaker Georgios Sideris, called Callapoda. It would thus be possible El Greco trained with Callapoda before he moved to Spain in 1577. Other scholars argue that the map was copied from an extant map of Toledo, specifically the Atlas de El Escorial. Three of the folios from this atlas contain preparatory radial graphs of a map of Toledo on their reverse, dating from between 1538 and 1545. The scholar first to lend this attribution was Francisco Vásquez Maure in 1982. His view was repeated by Antonio Crespo Sanz in his 2008 dissertation and in multiple later articles.

== Provenance ==
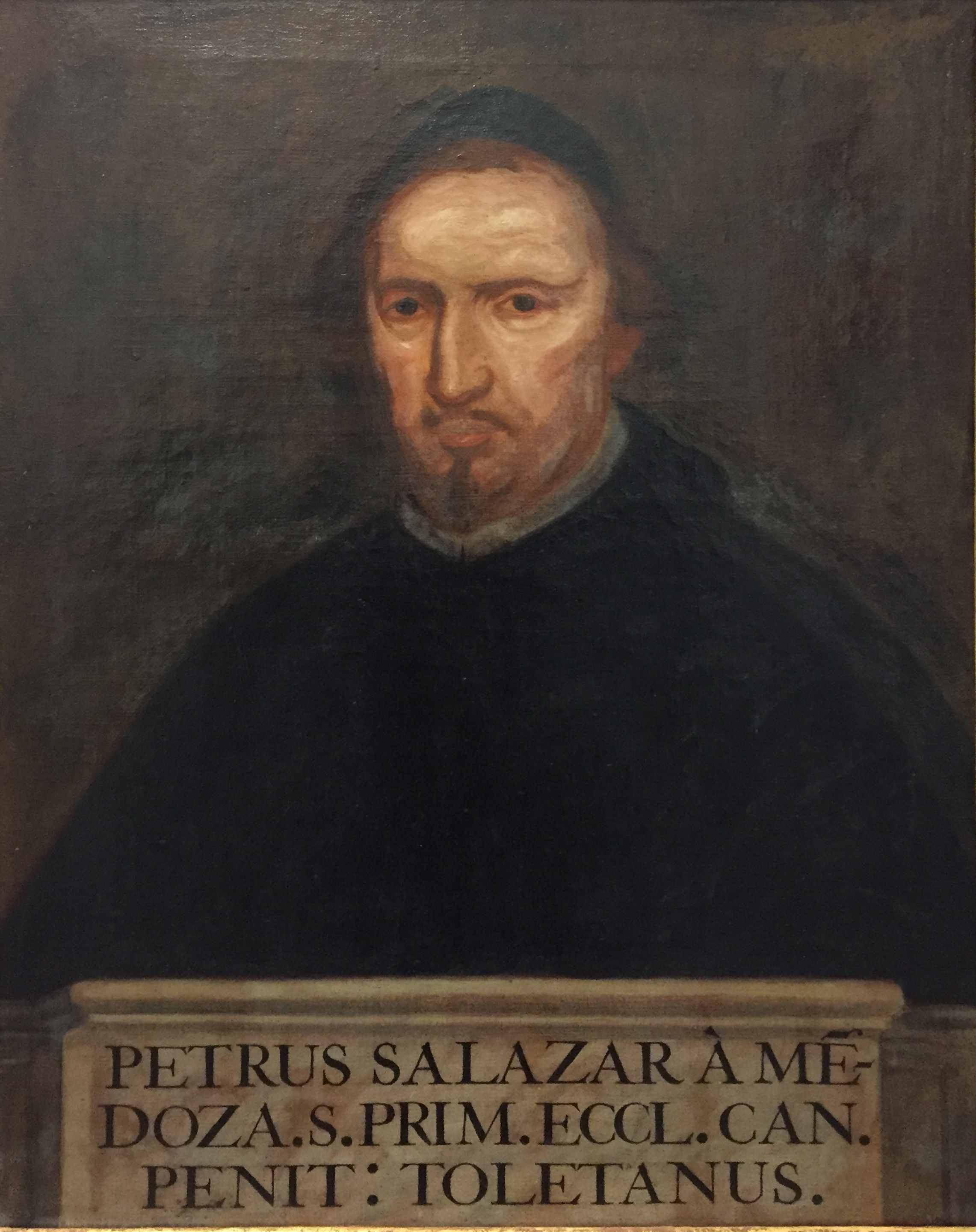
Portrait of Pedro Salazar de Mendoza, who likely commissioned View and Plan of Toledo

Though it was earlier thought that the painting was possibly commissioned by the city council of Toledo, current consensus is that it was probably commissioned by Pedro Salazar de Mendoza. Pedro Salazar was the administrator of the Tavera Hospital, depicted centrally in the painting, and was also an early collector of maps and city views. The painting appears on a 1629 inventory of Pedro Salazar's estate, along with View of Toledo and several portraits by El Greco. The commission of this painting would have coincided with Pedro Salazar's commission for El Greco's altarpieces in the chapel of the Tavera Hospital. The painting appears on the post-mortem inventory of El Greco's estate in 1614, and an inventory of Jorge Manuel's estate in 1621 indicating that Pedro Salazar did not receive the painting until several years after El Greco's death.

The painting was later owned by the Hospital de Santiago, and then the Convento de San Pedro Mártir and the Monasterio de San Juan de los Reyes. It entered the collection of the Museo del Greco in 1910.

== See also ==
- List of works by El Greco
