= Saliencia Lakes =

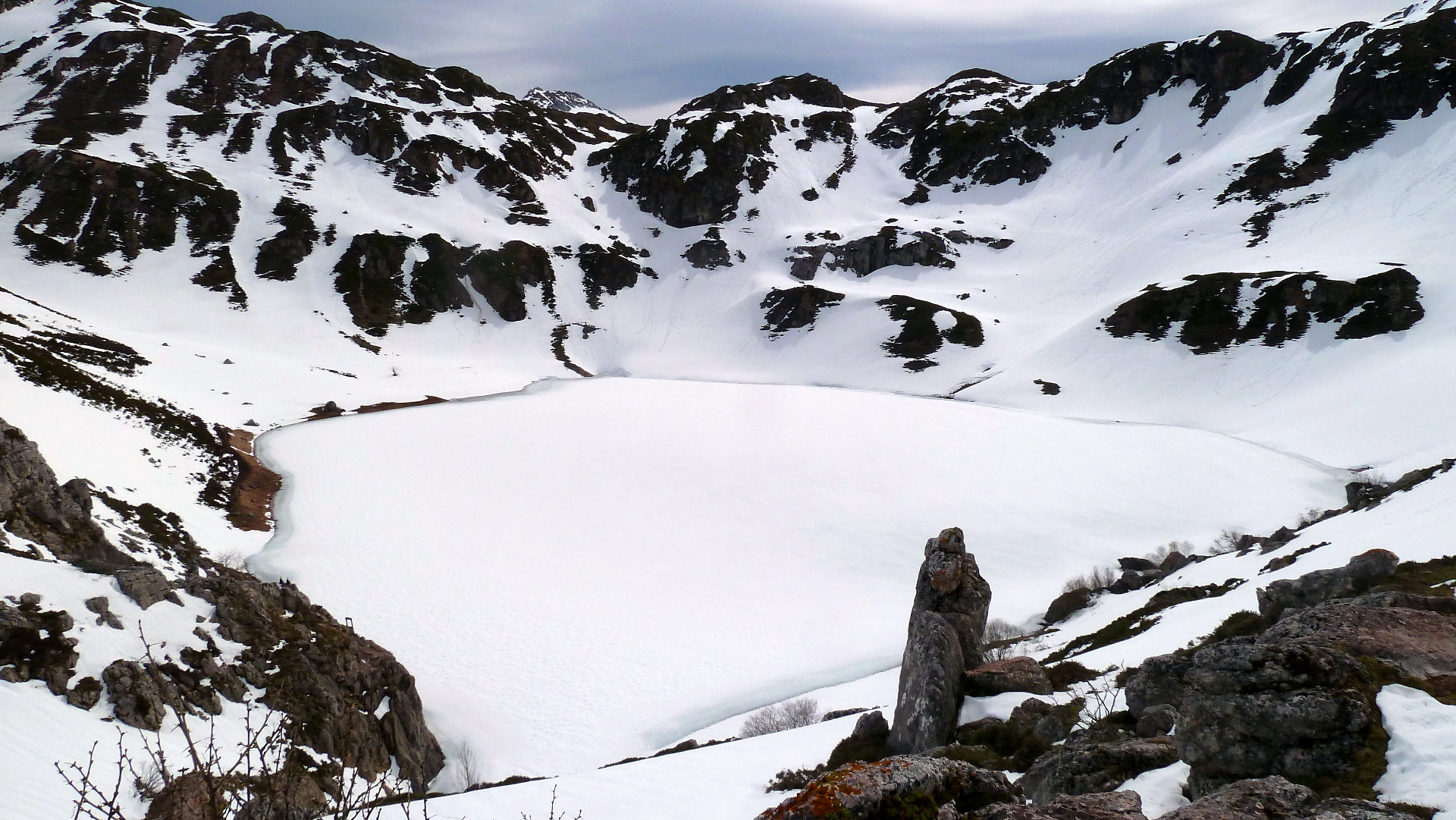

- Location within Spain
- Location: Somiedo, Asturias, Spain
- Type: Post-glacial lakes
- Primary inflows: Several streams
- Basin countries: Spain
- Surface elevation: 5,085 ft (1,550 m)

Saliencia Lakes are a conjoined group of post-glacial lakes in Somiedo, Asturias, Spain. They are situated in the Somiedo Natural Park and are composed of the following: Calabazosa (or Black Lake), Cerveriz, Almagrera Lagoon (or La Mina), and Lago de la Cueva. Lago del Valle, at 5,085 feet (1,550 m) above sea level, is the largest in the group and is the principality's largest lake. Fauna in the lake valley includes the presence of Eurasian brown bear, Otter, Egyptian vulture and Golden eagle. The majority of amphibians inside the park are found by these lakes, including Alpine newt, Palmate newt, Fire salamander, common toad, Common midwife toad, Common frog, and the Iberian frog. The lakes are protected space within the World Network of Biosphere Reserves of Somiedo Natural Park, declared a natural monument on 22 May 2003. Myth has it that the lakes are guarded by xanas (fairy princesses).

== Gallery ==
Lagos de Saliencia

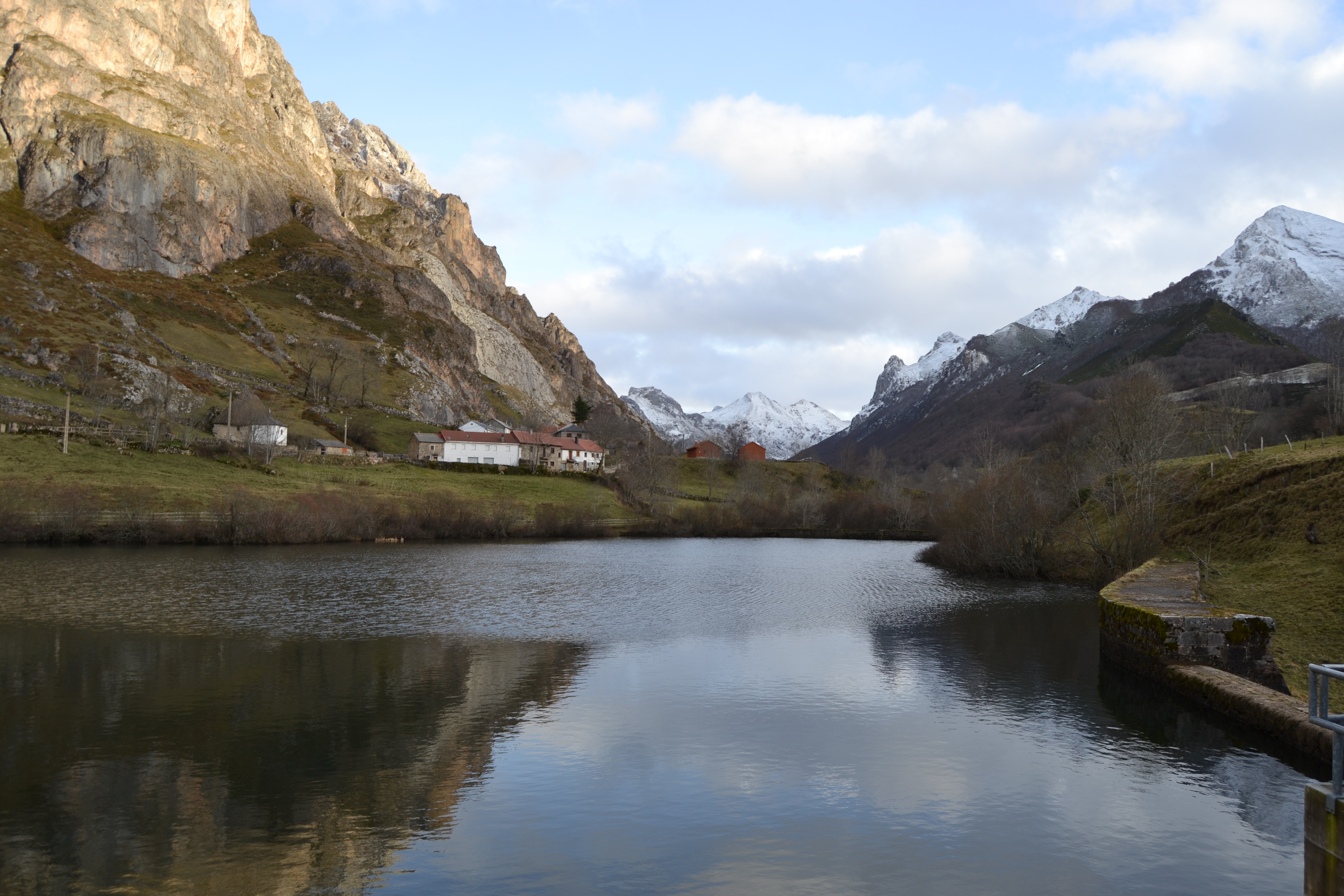
Reservoir at the entrance to the village of Valley of the Lake

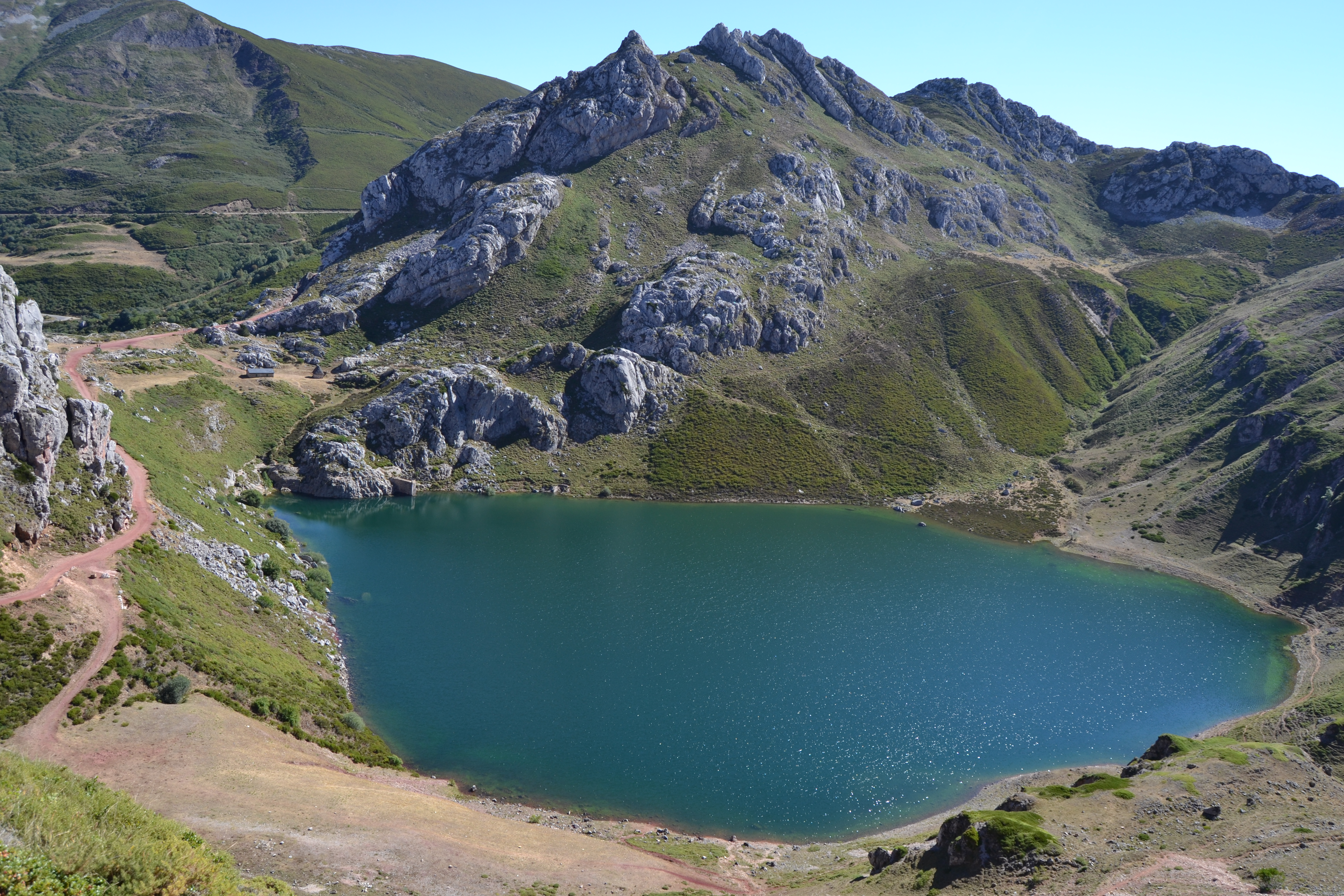
Lago de la Cueva

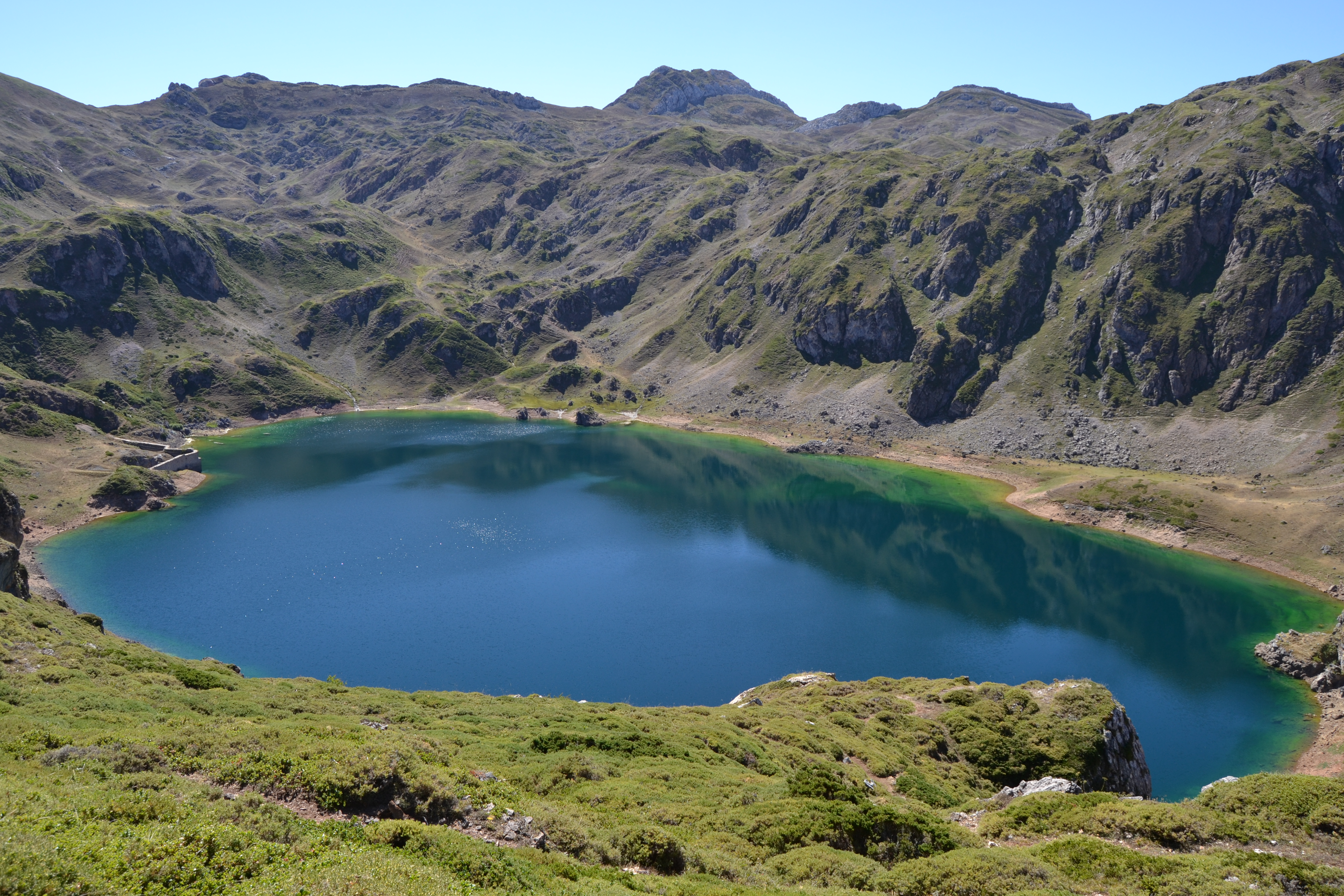
Lake Calabazosa

== See also ==
- Conjunto lacustre de Somiedo

== Bibliography ==
- Crane, Nicholas (1996). Clear waters rising: a mountain walk across Europe. Viking. ISBN 9780670868391.
- DK Publishing (7 July 2015). DK Eyewitness Travel Guide: Northern Spain. DK Publishing. ISBN 978-1-4654-4352-6.
