= Pigüeña =

Parish in Somiedo, Asturias, Spain

Coordinates: 43.133333°N 6.333333°W

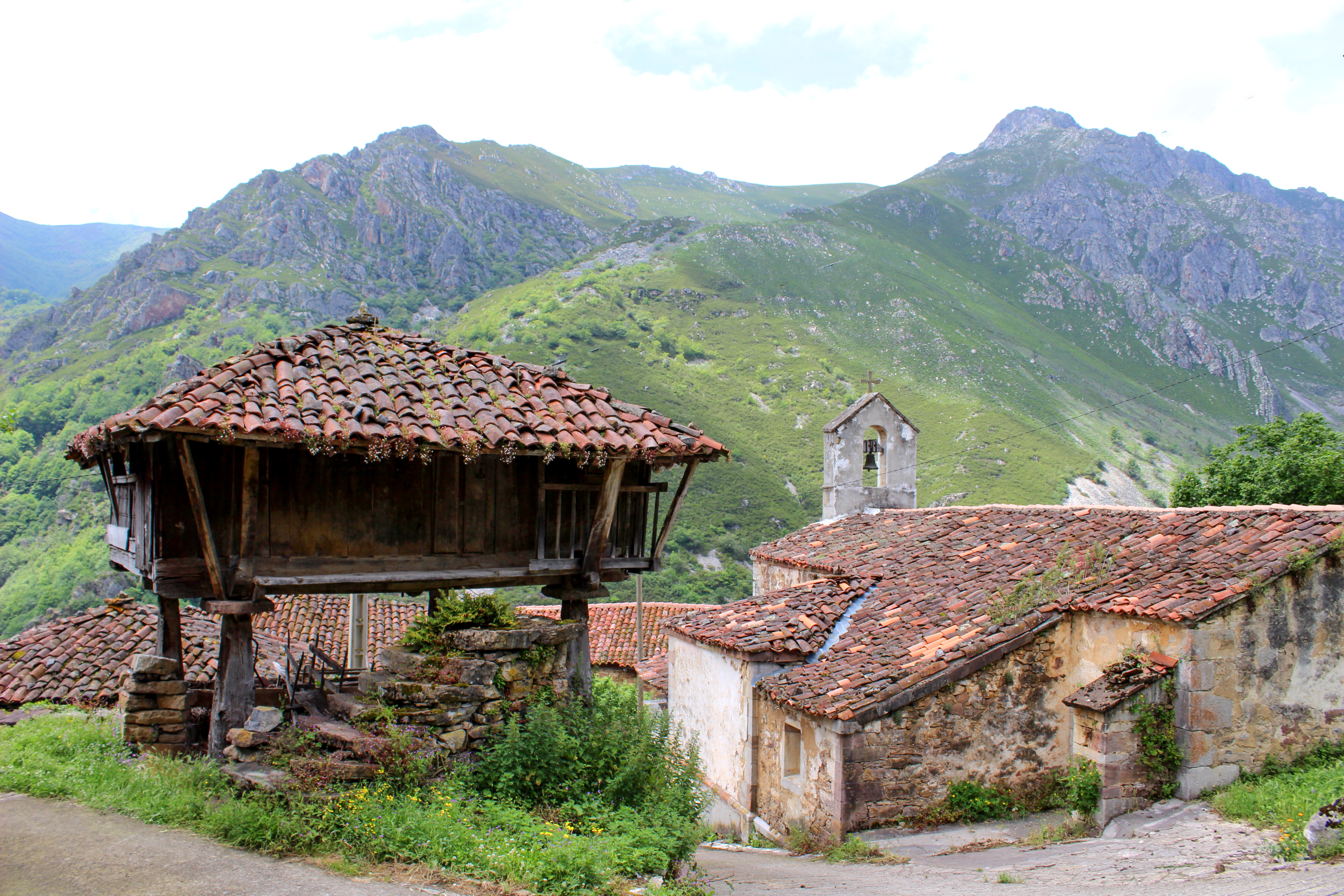
Pigüeña village

Pigüeña is one of fifteen parishes (administrative divisions) in Somiedo, a municipality within the province and autonomous community of Asturias, in northern Spain. The parish lies within Somiedo Natural Park, which was designated a Biosphere Reserve by UNESCO in 2000. It takes its name from the Pigüeña, a tributary of the Narcea that rises in the parish.

The parish covers 22.55 km^{2} (8.71 sq mi) and had a population of 136 in the 2006.

== Geography ==
Pigüeña lies in the western part of the municipality of Somiedo. The Pigüeña river rises at the Fuente de la Paradona at an altitude of 1,750 metres, flows 40.5 km (25.2 mi) through a drainage basin of 213.6 km^{2} (82.5 sq mi), and joins the Narcea near Samartín de Llodón in the municipality of Belmonte de Miranda.

== Villages ==
The parish is divided into three villages (aldeas):

- Pigüeña
- Rebollada (La Reboḷḷada in Asturian)
- Robledo (Robléu in Asturian)
