= Aguino =

Coordinates: 43.1°N 6.266667°W

Aguino is one of fifteen parishes (administrative divisions) in Somiedo, a municipality within the province and autonomous community of Asturias, in northern Spain. It consists of two villages, Aguino (Aguinu in Asturian) and Perlunes (Perllunes).

It is 14.82 km^{2} (5.72 sq mi) in size, with a population of 32 in 19 households. The postal code is 33840. Aguino is 4.8 km from the municipal capital. Architecturally, the Perlunes mill, the church of Santiago de Aguino, the chapel of San Antonio and Alba Castle (a 13th-century medieval fortification) are worthy of note.
