= View of Toledo =

Painting by El Greco

- Vista de Toledo (Spanish)
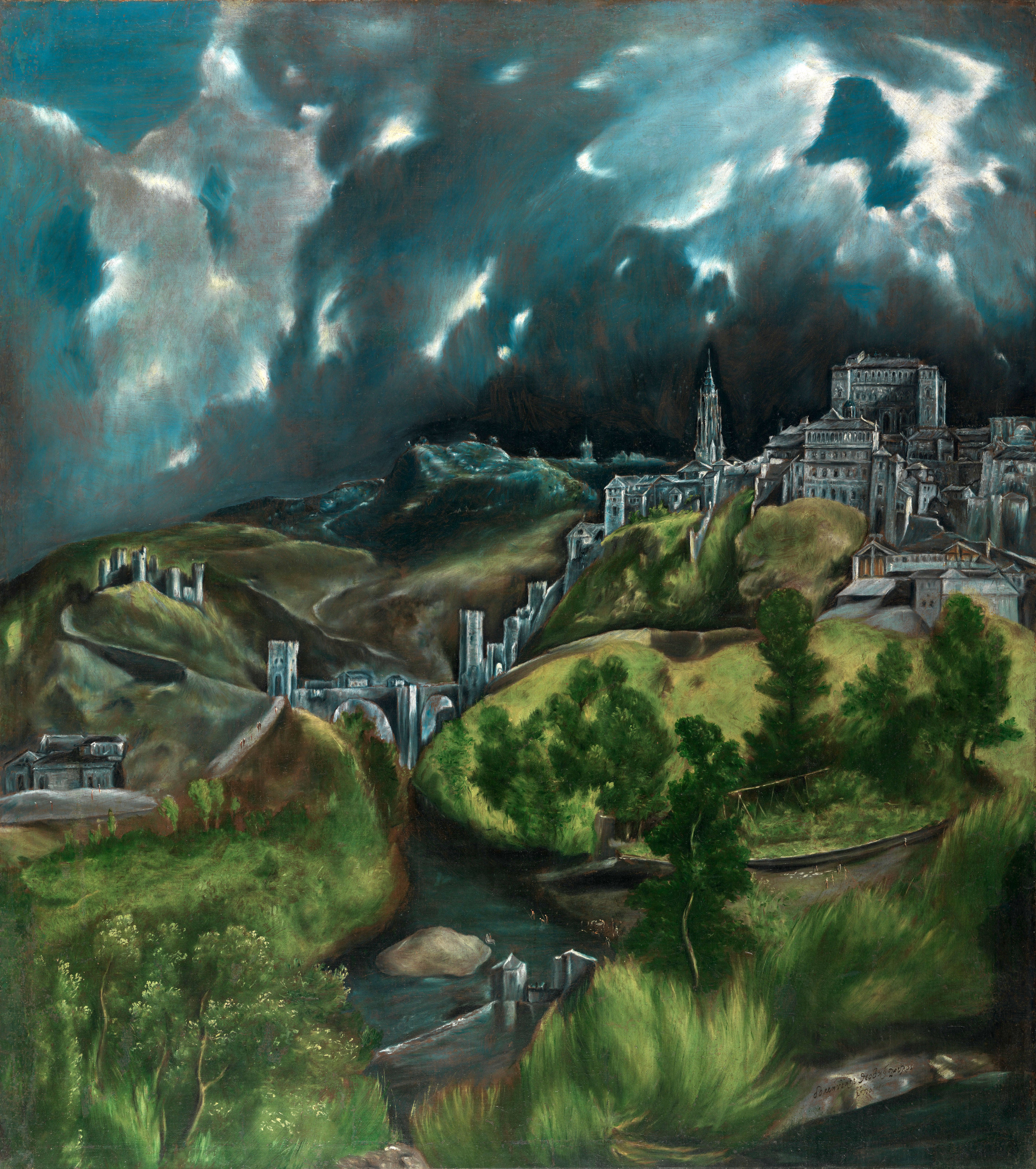
- Artist: El Greco
- Year: 1596–1600
- Medium: Oil on canvas
- Movement: Mannerism
- Dimensions: 121.3 cm × 108.6 cm (47.8 in × 42.8 in)
- Location: Metropolitan Museum of Art; New York City

View of Toledo (Spanish: Vista de Toledo), is one of the two surviving landscapes painted by El Greco, along with View and Plan of Toledo. View of Toledo is held by the Metropolitan Museum of Art in New York City.

View of Toledo is among the best known depictions of the sky in Western art, along with Vincent van Gogh's The Starry Night and the landscapes of J. M. W. Turner and Claude Monet. Art historian Keith Christiansen included View of Toledo among the artist's most ambitious masterpieces, describing it as one of Western art's most celebrated landscapes.

== Historical context ==
=== Dating ===
Art historians, specifically Harold Wethey, have debated the exact dating of View of Toledo. There was some debate among art historians due to early literature that wrote about El Greco. The early literature that Walter Liedtke mentions in "Three Paintings by El Greco," suggests that the View of Toledo was painted after 1600 and shortly before El Greco died in 1614. However, art historian Harold Wethey believes it was painted between 1595 and 1600 because of the similarities to El Greco's other piece, Saint Joseph and the Christ Child. Wethey backs up this claim because Saint Joseph and the Christ Child was completed between 1597 and 1599. Wethey also provides more evidence by pointing out the same techniques used in the background of Saint Joseph and the Christ Child that one can see in View of Toledo.

=== Significance of landscape ===
Landscape paintings were rare among Spanish paintings of the Renaissance and Baroque periods. Due to landscape paintings being so rare, some speculate that View of Toledo is actually from a larger painting. However, there has been no valid proof or confirmation to whether that is the case. The Council of Trent's perceived ban against landscape painting lends credence to the idea that this work may stand as the first Spanish landscape painting of its time.

== Description ==
View of Toledo is a landscape portrait. The painting is vibrant with blues, black, white, and vivid greens. It is made up of all earth tones. Most notable is the distinct color contrast between the darkness of the skies above and the vibrance of green in the hills below. View of Toledo shows viewers an image of darkness, or moodiness that is present in Toledo. Observers can see that the sky grows exceptionally dark near the city. El Greco creates a palette full of dramatic colors. While contemplating View of Toledo, people can see the contrast from light to dark. There are rolling hills depicted with Toledo at the top. The city of Toledo is very grey in contrast to the vibrant green of the hills. On the opposite end the city itself is also a light contrast to the dark color of the sky. El Greco uses pure colors to his advantage. The location of the Castle of San Servando, on the left, is accurately depicted. However, many other landmarks that are clearly referring to Toledo are not in the correct location that is true to the city. Walter Liedtke believes this is because El Greco painted the View of Toledo more as a future or a hope to what it would look like. Art historians, Jonathan Brown and Richard Kagan, have also hinted to the theory that El Greco painted the city of Toledo in an alternate way to fit his imagination or ideal version of Toledo.

== Style ==
El Greco has a unique style with influences from Italian artists as well as Spanish and Greek. Throughout his painting career, El Greco changed his style based upon the places he lived. However, he almost always painted with influence from his Cretan or Greek roots. He often wrote in Greek and used the Greek alphabet instead of the Latin alphabet. View of Toledo carries this tradition of his Greek roots through his signature. He always signed his art with his real name, Domenikos Theotokopoulos. El Greco's signature appears in the lower-right corner. El Greco's style was known to be more uneven. That uneven detail that is normally found in his art is in his line work and in the physical location of Toledo in the painting. While influenced by the Mannerist style, El Greco's expressive handling of color and form is without parallel in the history of art. The Welsh art historian David Davies asserts that the philosophies of Platonism and ancient Neo-Platonism, the works of Plotinus and Pseudo-Dionysius the Areopagite, the texts of the Church fathers and the liturgy offer the keys to the understanding of El Greco's style. Summarizing the ensuing scholarly debate on this issue, José Álvarez Lopera, curator at the Museo del Prado, Madrid, concludes that the presence of "Byzantine memories" is obvious in El Greco's mature works, though there are still some obscure issues concerning his Byzantine origins needing further illumination.

== Interpretation ==
=== Symbolism ===
The city of Toledo is at the very top of the hill in View of Toledo. Art historian, Walter Liedtke, speculates that El Greco wanted to emphasize the greatness of Toledo. Due to Toledo sitting at the top, it symbolized the city's position being near heaven, yet still at the top of hill making it of earthly possession. Using medieval tradition, El Greco incorporated landmarks such as the cathedral and the Alcázar which were positioned in a manner where he could create his version of Toledo, "a city of the spirit". Toledo is the highest point it could be without being unnatural or in the sky, almost as if El Greco used the hills to work as a pedestal. It is thought that this painting's enigmatic symbolism could be related to the mysticism that infused the city during the period.

== Comparison to View and Plan of Toledo ==
View of Toledo and View and Plan of Toledo, on display at the El Greco Museum in Toledo, have the same city as the center of its image, but a much different appearance and message. For starters, View of Toledo was painted before the latter. It has a more vibrant feeling with all the green and white to contrast the dark blue and black. View and Plan of Toledo has a much warmer and earth tone to it with lots of browns. It is also an aerial perspective in comparison to View of Toledo. For being paintings depicting Toledo, they could not be any more different. However, they were believed to be commissioned by Pedro Salazar de Mendoza as they were found to be a part of his personal collection after his death. Salazar was very passionate about Toledo in every aspect. Due to Salazar's love of the city, it is believed to have inspired El Greco to paint both View of Toledo and View and Plan of Toledo.

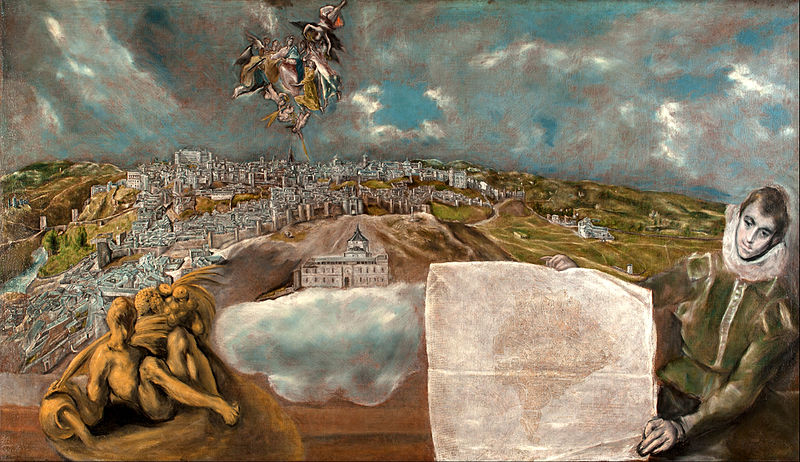
View and Plan of Toledo is the only other known landscape portrait by El Greco. It is believed to have been completed sometime between 1600 and 1610.

== See also ==
- List of works by El Greco
- 100 Great Paintings, 1980 BBC series
