= El Coto =

Parish in Somiedo, Spain

Coordinates: 43.083333°N 6.233333°W

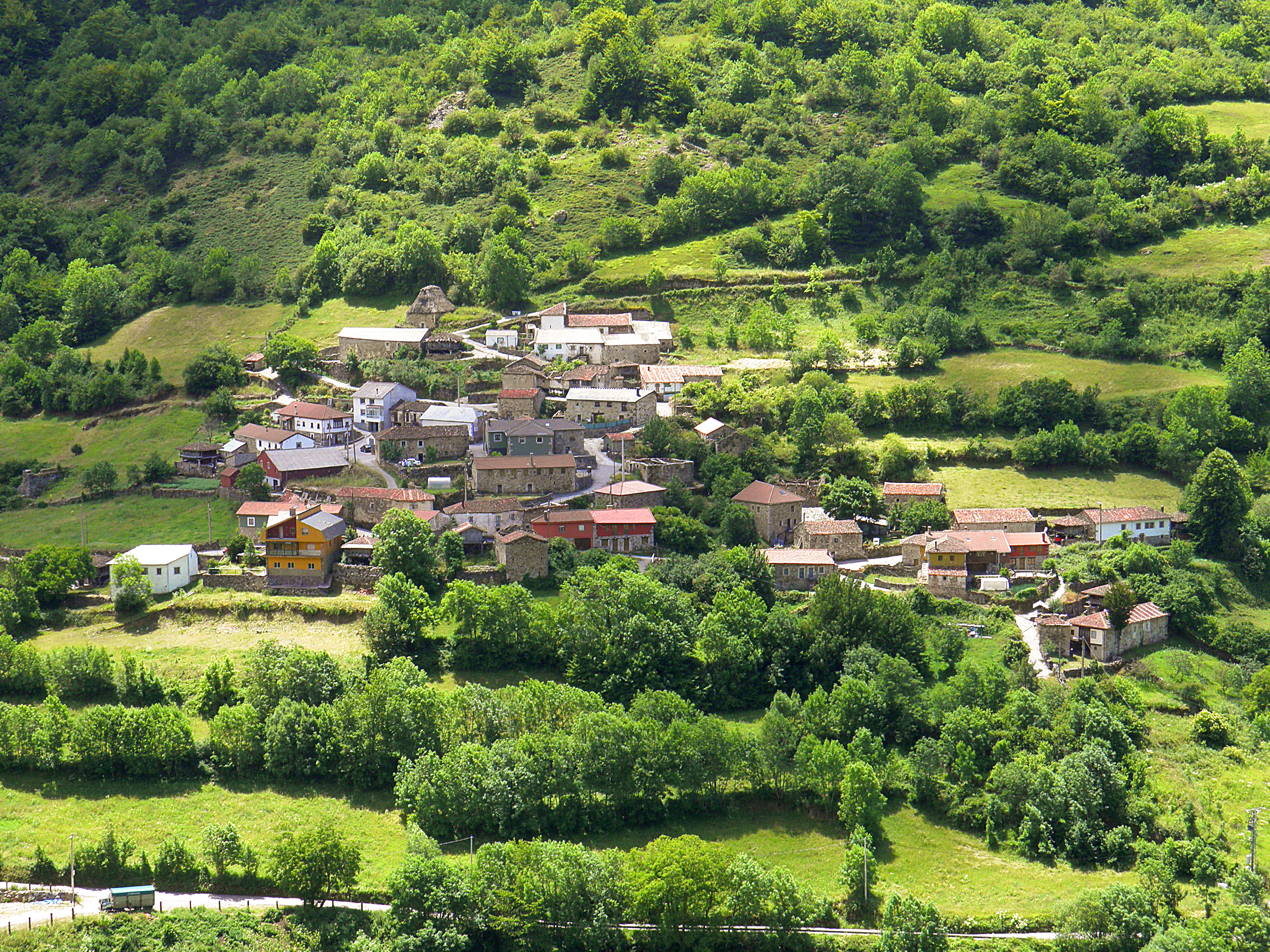
El Coto (Somiedo, Asturias).jpg

El Coto (variant: Coto de Buenamadre) is one of fifteen parishes (administrative divisions) in Somiedo, a municipality within the province and autonomous community of Asturias, in northern Spain.

It is situated at an elevation of 1,000 m (3,300 ft) above sea level. It is 7.36 km^{2} (2.84 sq mi) in size, with a population of 86 (INE 2006). The postal code is 33840.

== Villages ==
- El Coto (El Coutu)
- Urria
