= Éndriga =

Coordinates: 43.083333°N 6.15°W

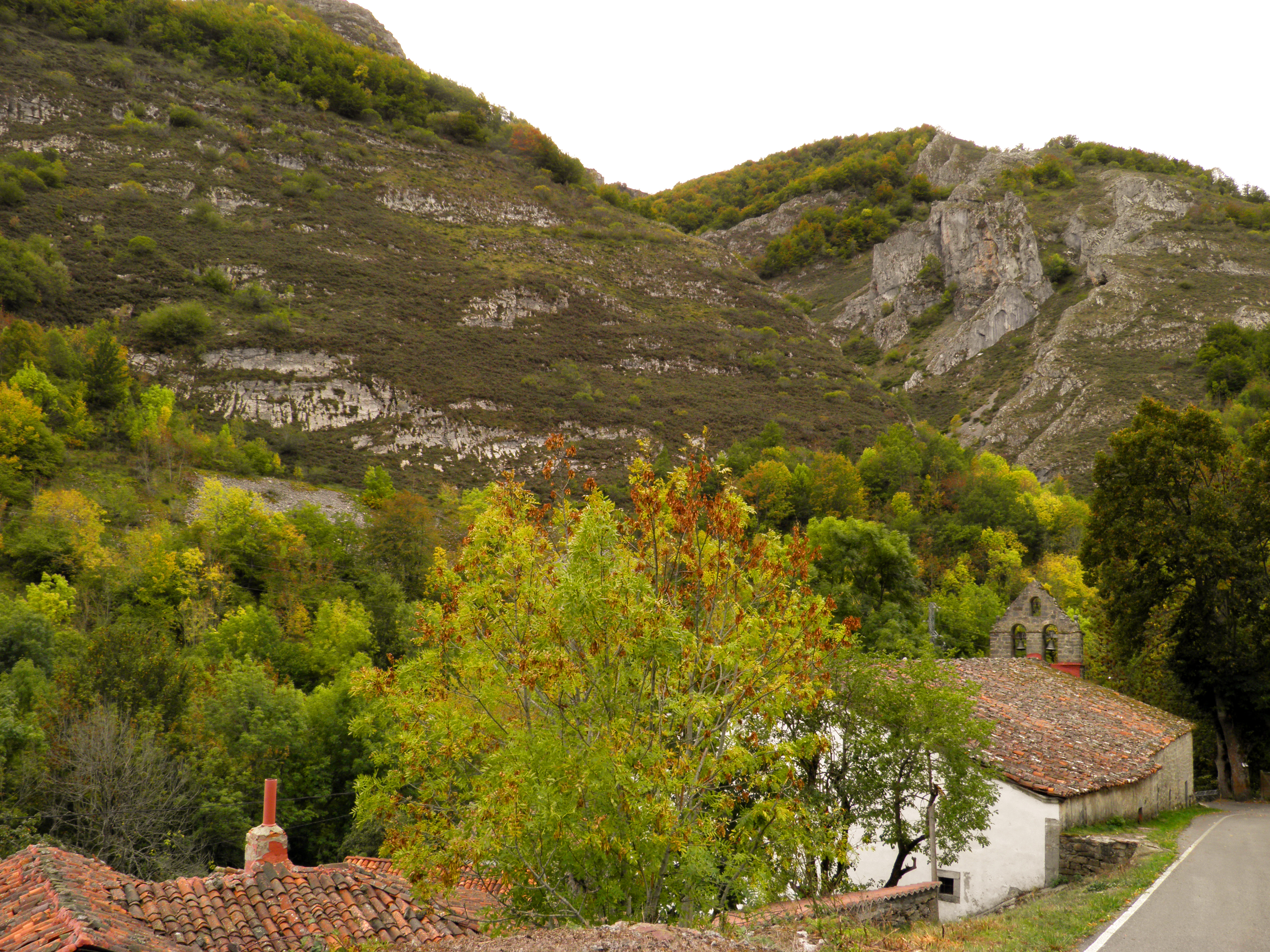
Éndriga (Somiedo, Asturias)

Éndriga is one of fifteen parishes (administrative divisions) in Somiedo, a municipality within the province and autonomous community of Asturias, in northern Spain.

It is situated at an elevation of 1,050 m (3,440 ft) above sea level. It is 36.92 km^{2} (14.25 sq mi) in size, with a population of 135 (INE 2006). The postal code is 33840.

== Villages ==
- Arbichales
- Éndriga
- Saliencia
