= Clavillas =

Coordinates: 43.166667°N 6.25°W

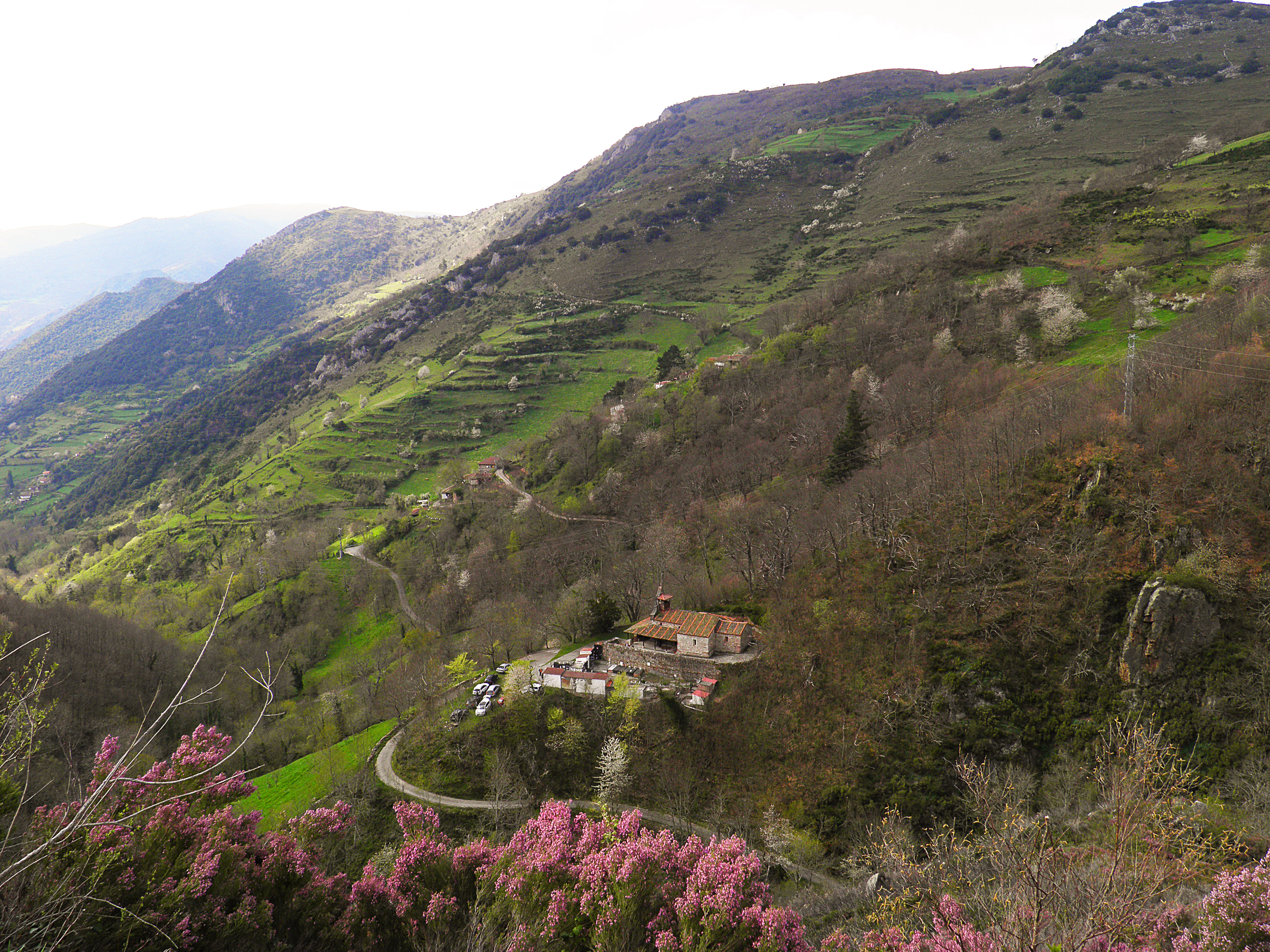
Clavillas (Somiedo, Asturias)

Clavillas is one of fifteen parishes (administrative divisions) in Somiedo, a municipality within the province and autonomous community of Asturias, in northern Spain.

It is 13.04 km^{2} (5.03 sq mi) in size, with a population of 101 (INE 2006). The postal code is 33841.

As of 2023 its total population is 53.

== Villages ==
- Bustariega (La Bustariega)
- Clavillas (Clavichas)
- Santiago (Santiagu)
- Valcárcel
