= Veigas (Somiedo) =

Parish in Somiedo, Asturias, Spain

Coordinates: 43.1°N 6.2°W

Veigas is one of fifteen parishes (administrative divisions) in Somiedo, a municipality within the province and autonomous community of Asturias, in northern Spain.

It is 20.3 km^{2} (7.8 sq mi) in size, with a population of 68 (INE 2006). The postal code is 33840.

== Villages ==
- Escobio (L'Escobiu)
- La Falguera
- La Llamera
- Veigas
- Villarín
