= Las Morteras =

Coordinates: 43.15°N 6.216667°W

- Parish
- Interactive map of Las Morteras
- Country: Spain
- Com. aut.: Asturias
- Concejo: Somiedo

Area
  - Total: 13.03 km^{2} (5.03 sq mi)

Population
  - Total: 64
- Postal code: 33841

Las Morteras is one of fifteen parishes (administrative divisions) in Somiedo, a municipality within the province and autonomous community of Asturias, in northern Spain. It is 13.03 km^{2} (5 sq mi) in size, with a population of 64 (INE 2006). The postal code is 33841.

== Villages ==
- Las Morteras
- Orderias
- Villamor

== Notable residents ==
- Diego Flórez Valdés, historical figure
