= Corés =

Coordinates: 43.116667°N 6.316667°W

- Parish
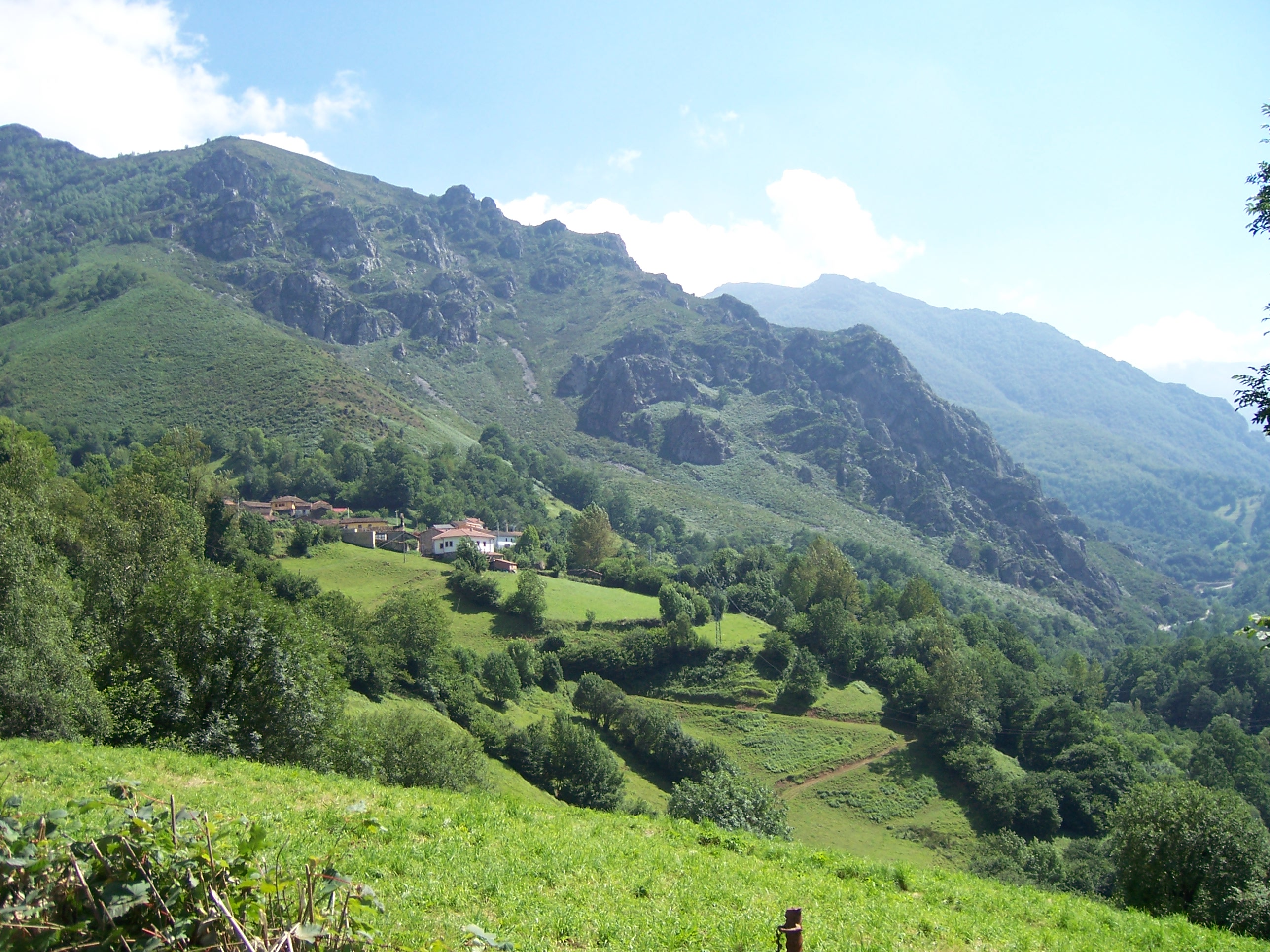
- View of Corés
- Interactive map of Corés
- Country: Spain

Area
  - Total: 7.5 km^{2} (2.9 sq mi)

Population (2006)
  - Total: 31
  - Density: 4.13/km^{2} (10.7/sq mi)
- Postal code: 33842

Corés is one of fifteen parishes (administrative divisions) in Somiedo, a municipality within the province and autonomous community of Asturias, in northern Spain.

It is 7.5 km^{2} (2.9 sq mi) in size, with a population of 31 (INE 2006). The postal code is 33842.
