= La Riera (Somiedo) =

- Parish
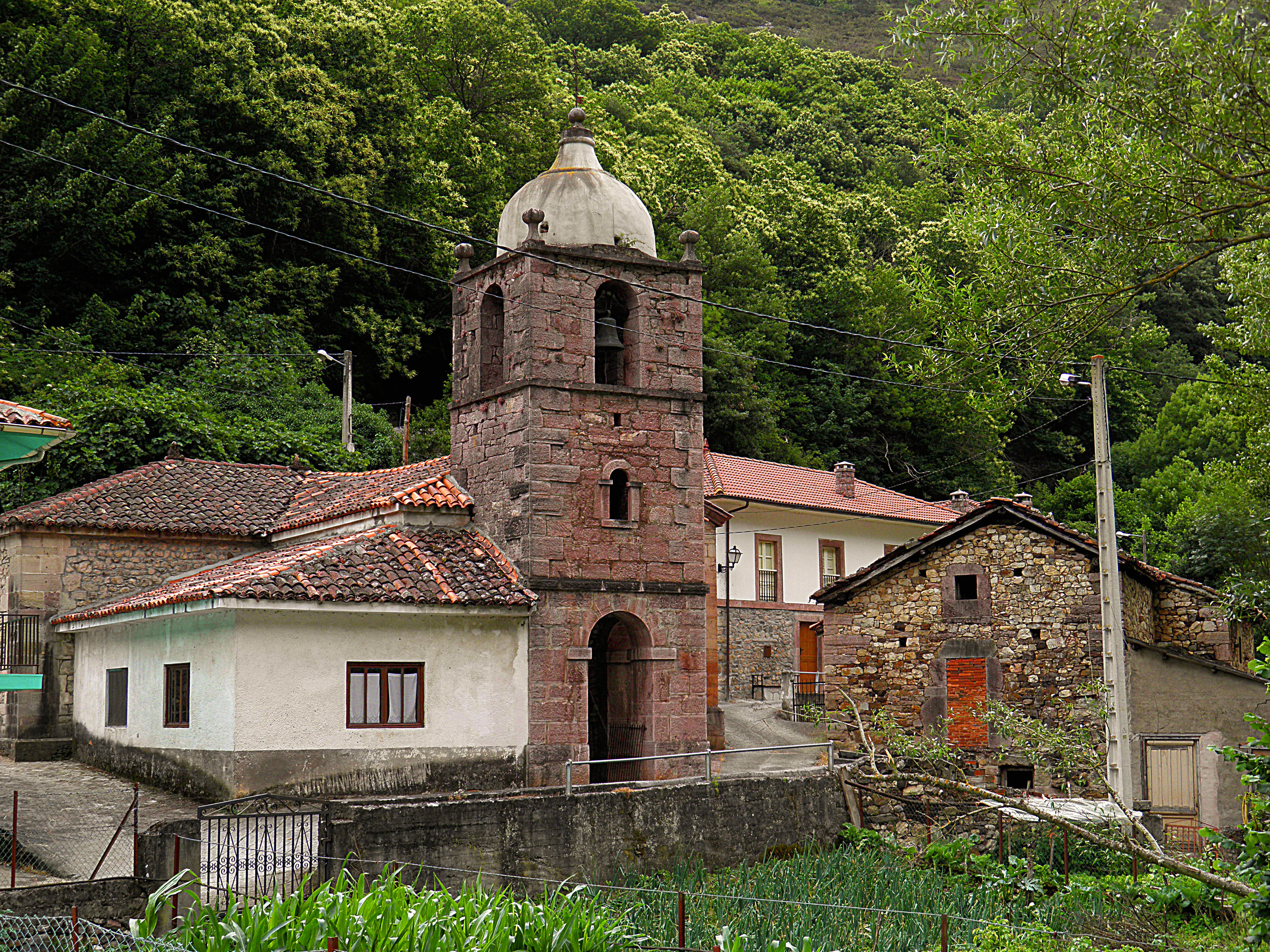
- La Riera (Somiedo, Asturias)
- Interactive map of La Riera
- Location within Asturias Location within Spain
- Coordinates: 43.15°N 6.25°W
- Country: Spain
- Province: Asturias
- Autonomous Community: Asturias
- Comarca: Oviedo
- Municipality: Somiedo
- Postal code: 33841

La Riera is one of fifteen parishes in Somiedo, a municipality within the province and autonomous community of Asturias, in northern Spain.

It is 8.96 km^{2} (3.46 sq mi) in size, with a population of 117 (INE 2006). The postal code is 33841.

== Villages ==
- La Riera
- Las Viñas
- Villaux (Villaús)
