= Pigüeces =

Coordinates: 43.15°N 6.316667°W

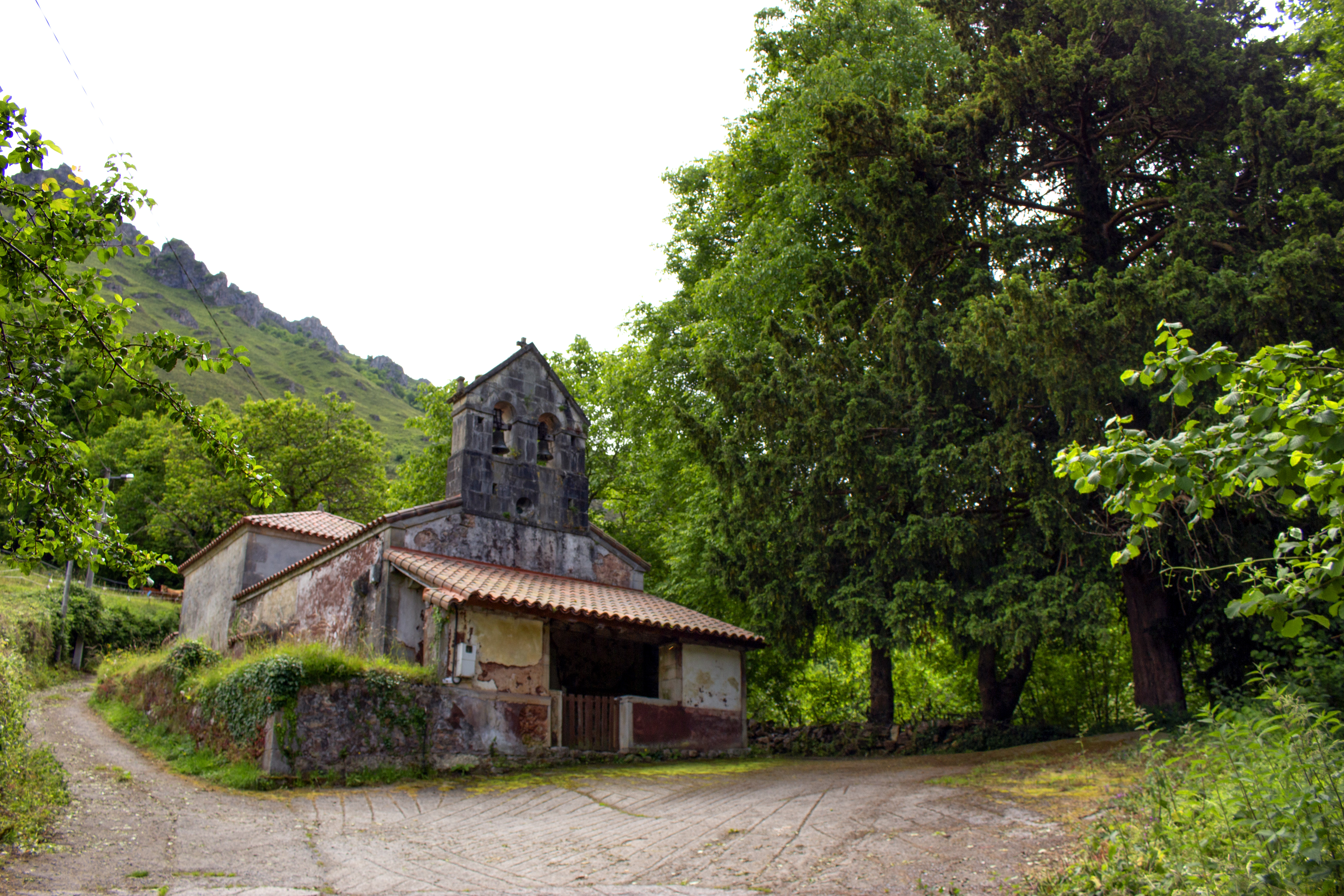
Pigüeces

Pigüeces is one of fifteen parishes (administrative divisions) in Somiedo, a municipality in the province and autonomous community of Asturias, in northern Spain.

== Villages ==
- Aguasmestas
- Pigüeces
- Santullano (Santuchanu)
