= Gúa =

Parish (parroquia) in Somiedo, Asturias, Spain

Coordinates: 43.083333°N 6.25°W

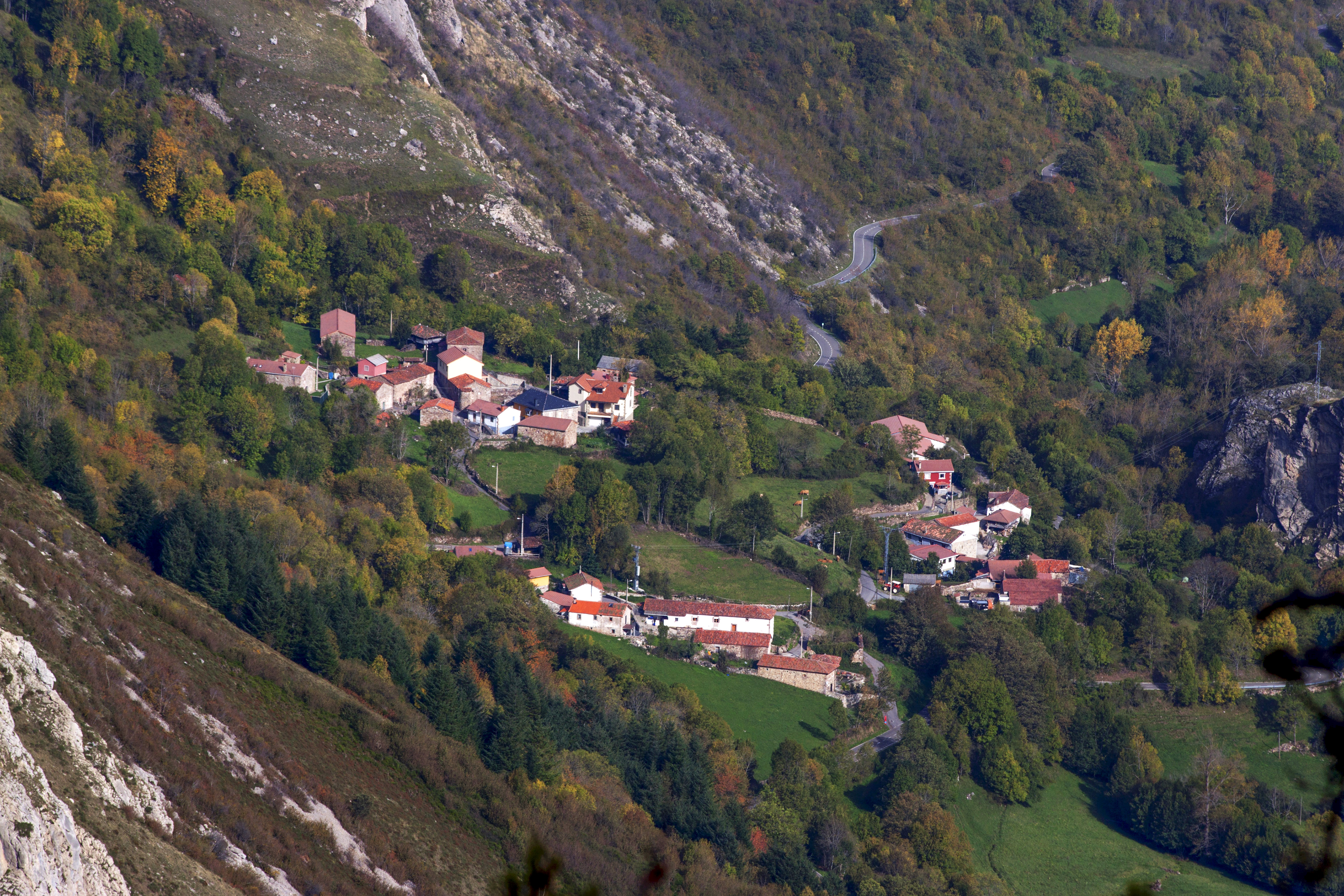
Gúa (Somiedo, Asturias)

Gúa is one of fifteen parishes (administrative divisions) in Somiedo, a municipality within the province and autonomous community of Asturias, in northern Spain.

It is 25.77 km^{2} (9.95 sq mi) in size, with a population of 138 (INE 2006). The postal code is 33840.

== Villages ==
- Caunedo (Caunéu)
- Gúa
- La Peral
- Llamardal (El L.lamardal)
