= Somiedo =

- Municipality
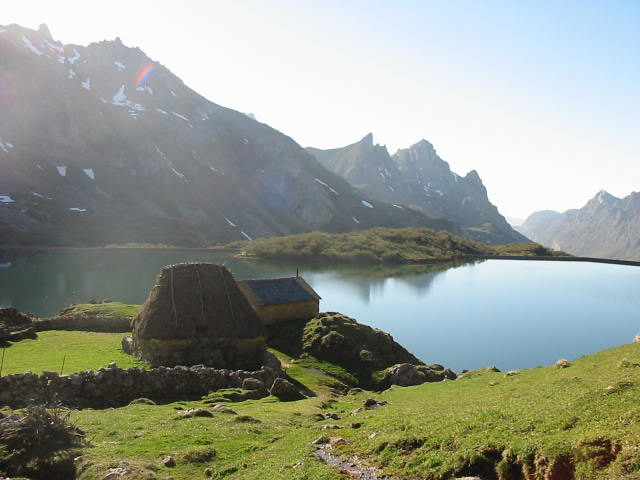

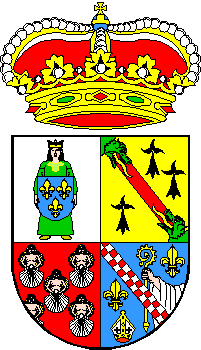
- Flag Coat of arms

- Location in Spain
- Coordinates: 43°6′N 6°15′W
- Country: Spain
- Autonomous community: Asturias
- Province: Asturias
- Comarca: Oviedo
- Judicial district: Grado
- Capital: Pola de Somiedo

Government
  - Alcalde: Belarmino Fernández Fervienza (PSOE)

Area
  - Total: 291.38 km^{2} (112.50 sq mi)
- Highest elevation: 2,194 m (7,198 ft)

Population (2025-01-01)
  - Total: 1,031
  - Density: 3.538/km^{2} (9.164/sq mi)
- Demonym: somedano/a
- Time zone: UTC+1 (CET)
  - Summer (DST): UTC+2 (CEST)
- Postal code: 33840 - 3842
- Website: Official website

Somiedo (Asturian: Somiedu) is a municipality in the Autonomous Community of the Principality of Asturias, Spain. It is bordered on the north by Belmonte de Miranda, on the east by Teverga, on the west by Tineo and Cangas del Narcea, and on the south by the province of León.

It is the second least densely populated municipality in Asturias.

All of the municipality forms part of Somiedo Natural Park, which has been declared a biosphere reserve by Unesco. Saliencia Lakes are located in Somiedo.

== Parishes ==
- Aguino
- Clavillas
- Corés
- El Coto
- El Puerto
- Endriga
- Gúa
- La Riera
- Las Morteras
- Pigüeña
- Pigüeces
- Pola de Somiedo
- Valle de Lago
- Veigas
- Villar de Vildas

== Politics ==
	PSOE	PP	CDS	Otros	Total
1979	6	4	1	0	11
1983	7	4	-	0	11
1987	7	4	-	0	11
1991	7	2	-	0	9
1995	5	4	-	0	9
1999	7	1	-	1	9
2003	8	1	-	0	9
2007	7	2	-	0	9

== See also ==
- List of municipalities in Asturias
