= Castle of San Servando =

Medieval castle in Toledo, Spain

Coordinates: 39.8604°N 4.0156°W

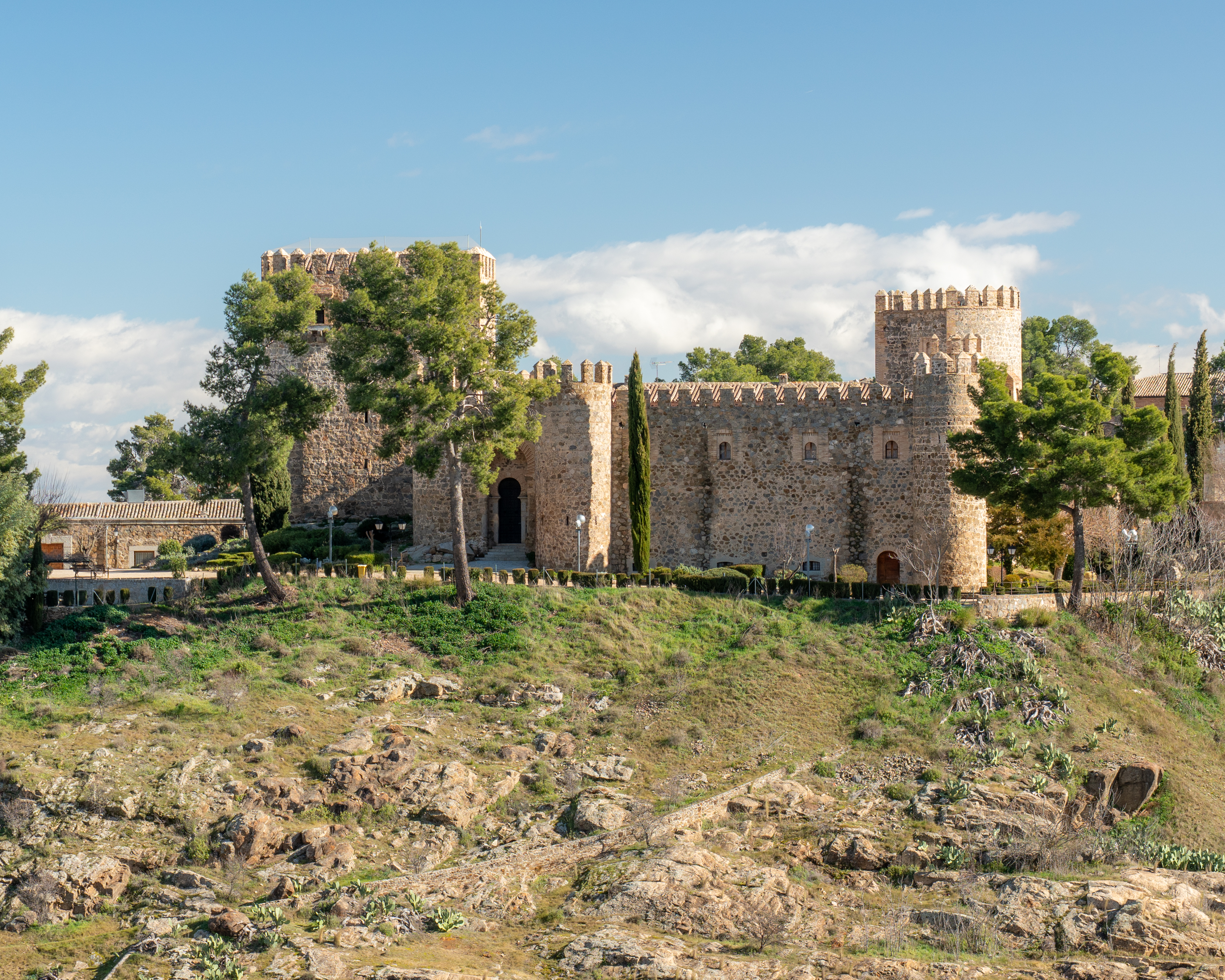
The Castle in 2025

The Castle of San Servando is a medieval castle in Toledo, Spain, near the Tagus River. It was begun as a monastery, occupied first by monks and later by the Knights Templar.

In 1874 the castle was named a national monument. The fortress was depicted in El Greco's painting View of Toledo. Lying at the opposite bank of the Tagus than the main urban core, it is connected to the Santa Bárbara residential area through the Cuesta de San Servando.

== Monastery ==
=== Benedictines ===
Evidence exists of an ancient monastery attached to a basilica of the same name, possibly founded in the 7th century. In 1080, Cardinal Richard of St. Victor, a monk of the ancient Abbey of St. Victor in Marseille, was sent as the legate of Pope Gregory VII to the Council of Burgos held that year. One of his mandates was to ensure the adoption of the Roman Rite, replacing the ancient Mozarabic Rite used by the Christians of Iberia for centuries. He carried specific instructions for the restoration of San Servando and its adoption of Roman liturgical practice.

After several centuries under Muslim rule, the city was conquered by the Christian army of King Alfonso VI of Castile in 1085, both he and his wife, Constance of Burgundy, became generous benefactors of the basilica and rebuilt the monastery. According to John Ormsby, the English translator of Don Quixote by Miguel de Cervantes, Alfonso VI called the castle "San Servando" after a Spanish martyr, a name subsequently modified into San Servan (in which form it appears in the "Poem of the Cid"), San Servantes, and San Cervantes. Mr. Ormsby mentions that "there is a complete history of the Cervantes family from the tenth century down to the seventeenth extant under the title "Illustrious Ancestry, Glorious Deeds, and Noble Posterity of the Famous Nuino Alfonso, Alcaide of Toledo," written in 1648 Rodrigo Mendez Silva." On the side of the mountain, near the Castle, a poem by Miguel de Cervantes was enshrined in 2005, four hundred years after Miguel de Cervantes wrote it. A picture of the poem is at panoramio.com.

On 11 March 1088, the king offered the monastery to the Holy See on the condition that it be permanently administered by the Abbey of St. Victor, along with all its goods and benefits. This arrangement was approved by Pope Urban II, who was elected the day after the documents for the donation were drawn up, on 20 February 1089. He entrusted the task to Cardinal Richard, by then himself Abbot of St. Victor. After that point, the monastery came under the authority of the Abbey of St. Victor and French monks began to occupy the Spanish monastery, introducing the Rule of St. Benedict.

King Alfonso saw the monastery as a bulwark of Christian presence in the region, and on 13 February 1099, made a donation of the Church of Santa María de Alficén, and of the community surrounding it, which was a traditional Mozarabic territory. He gave the monastery the objective of maintaining this identity among the populace. He further founded a monastery of Benedictine nuns to be attached to the church. Both monastic communities were charged with providing care and hospitality to the poor of the region and to travelers.

The monastery was destroyed by Saracen attacks in 1110, and the monks returned to Marseille. It was at this point that the Monastery of San Servando entered a new phase of its existence, as it became the possession of the Archbishop of Toledo and the cathedral chapter.

=== Knights Templar ===
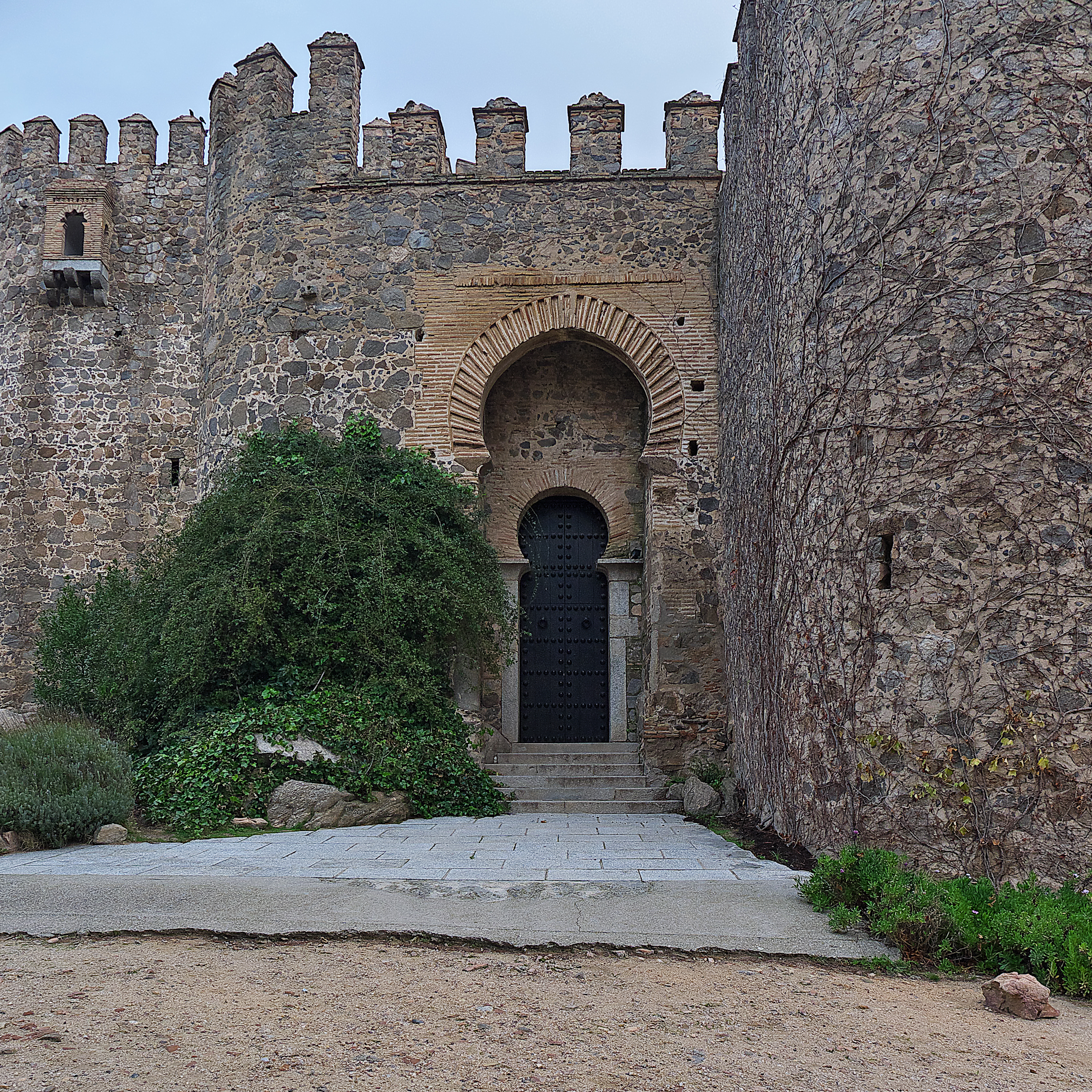
Portal

King Alfonso VIII gave the monastery to the Knights Templar, who converted the monastery into a fortress in order to protect the Puente de Alcántara against a possible Muslim attack. With the disappearance of the Muslim threat and the dissolution of the Templars in 1312, the fortress lost its importance and was neglected. Today tours of the castle are conducted about the alleged haunting of the site by a miscreant knight, Don Nuño Alvear, who supposedly died after being shown his many victims in a vision.

== Later use ==
The fortress was depicted in El Greco's noted landscape work, View of Toledo.

It is currently used as a youth hostel.
