= Puente de Alcántara =

Alcántara bridge Spanish: Puente de Alcántara
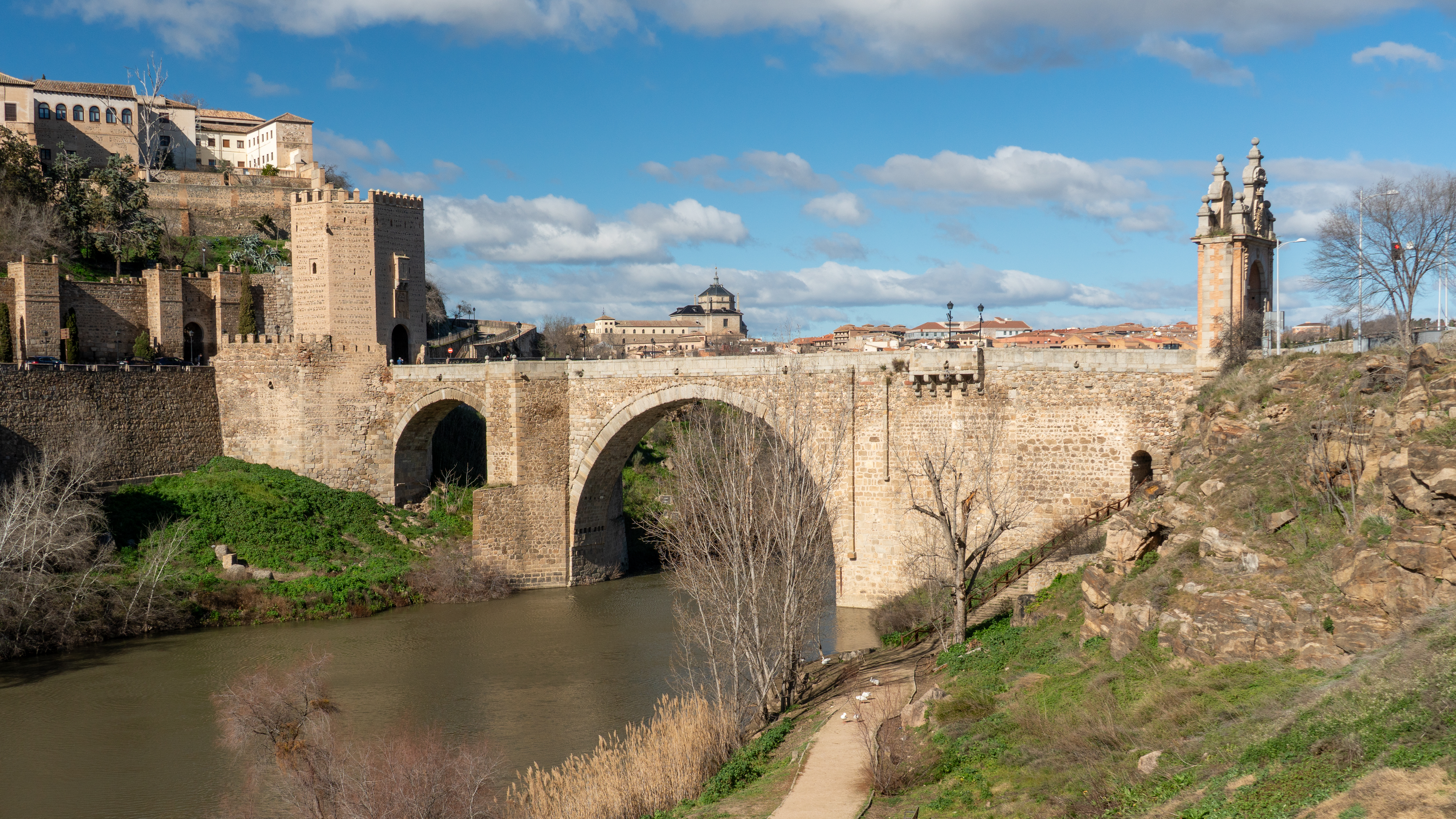
- South bank view in 2025
- Coordinates: 39.8603°N 4.0175°W
- Crosses: Tagus
- Locale: Toledo, Spain
- Preceded by: Azarquiel bridge
- Followed by: New Alcántara bridge Saint Martin bridge

Characteristics
- Design: arch
- Total length: 83 m (272 ft)
- Traversable?: No

Location
- Interactive map of Alcántara bridge

The Puente de Alcántara is a Roman arch bridge in Toledo, Spain, spanning the River Tagus. The word Alcántara comes from Arabic القنطرة (al-qanṭarah), which means "arch".

Located at the foot of the Castillo de San Servando, it was built by the Romans after they founded the city. In the Middle Ages it was one of the few entrances for pilgrims into the city.

It currently has two arches. There is evidence of its construction in Roman times, at the founding of Toletum. It was damaged and rebuilt in the 10th century, at which time a third arch disappeared, reduced to a gate with a horseshoe arch. It was one of the only bridges that gave access to the city and in the Middle Ages it was the obligatory entry for all pilgrims.

During the reign of Alfonso X of Castile it suffered serious damage due to flooding and was rebuilt. The western tower belongs to this period, later decorated under the reign of the Catholic Monarchs, whose arms decorate its walls. The fruit of the pomegranate (the emblem of Granada) is missing from them, because the Reconquista had not finished at that time.

The eastern tower was replaced by a Baroque triumphal arch in 1721, because of its ruinous state.

It was declared a national cultural monument in 1921.

The bridge should not be confused with either the Alcántara Bridge in Alcántara or the Alconétar Bridge in the Extremadura region, both Roman bridges which cross the River Tagus further downstream.

== Gallery ==
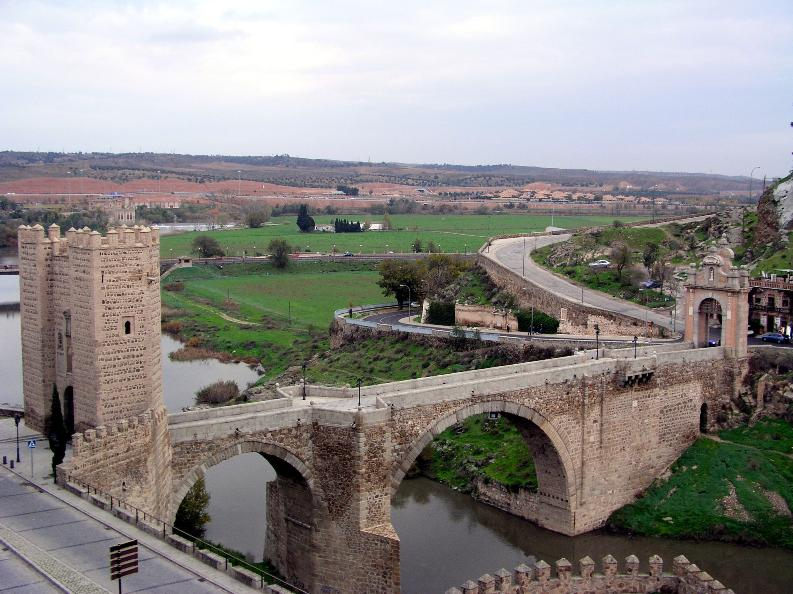
Elevated view of the bridge

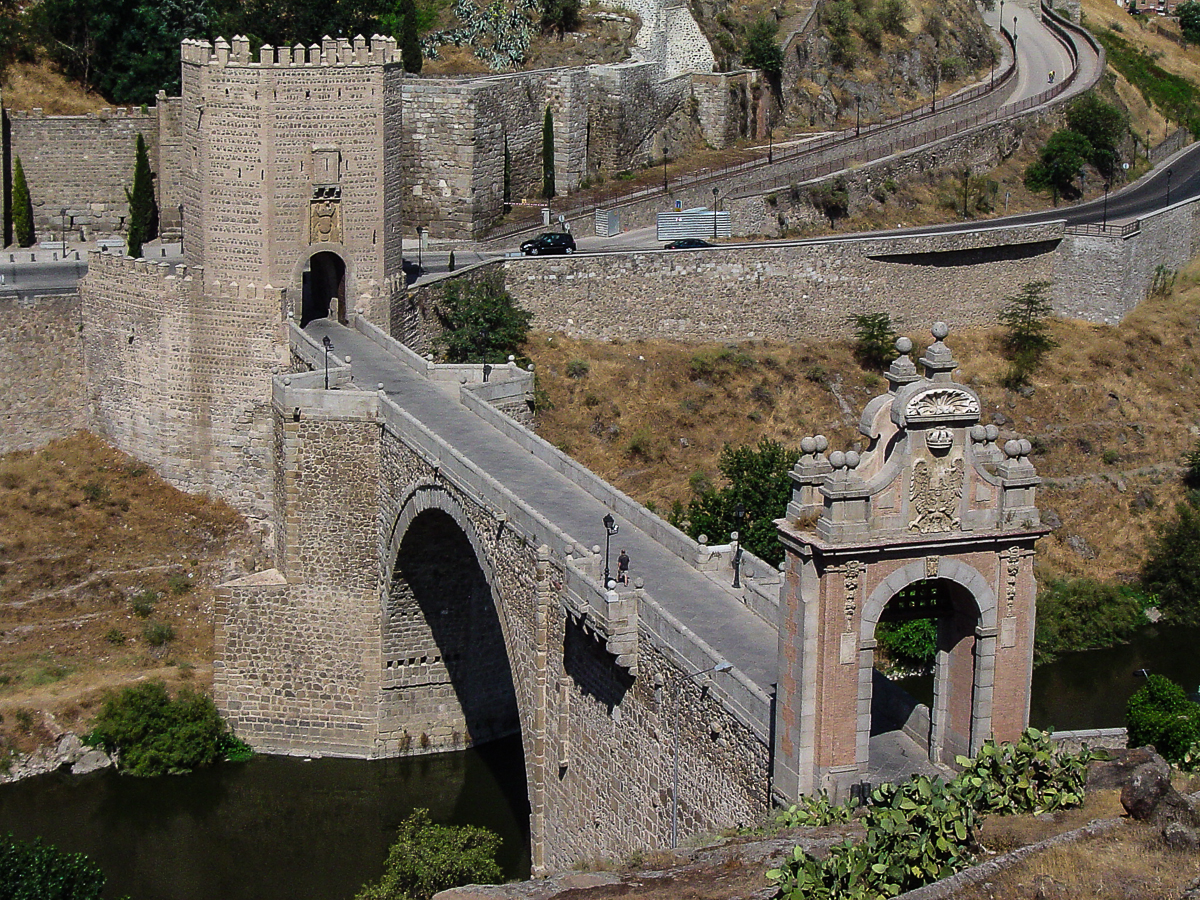
The Baroque triumphal arch

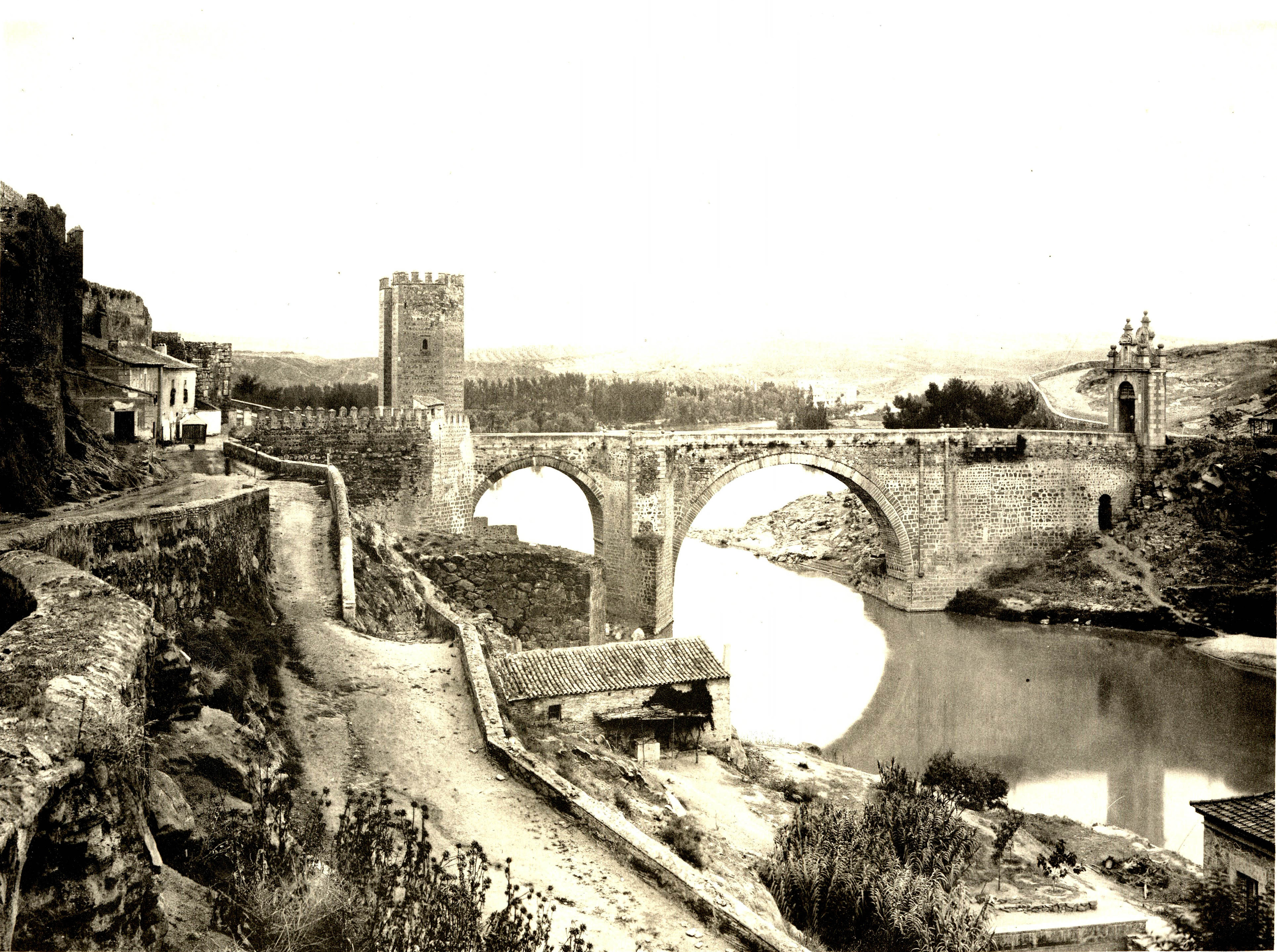
The Alcántara Bridge, collotype, 1889

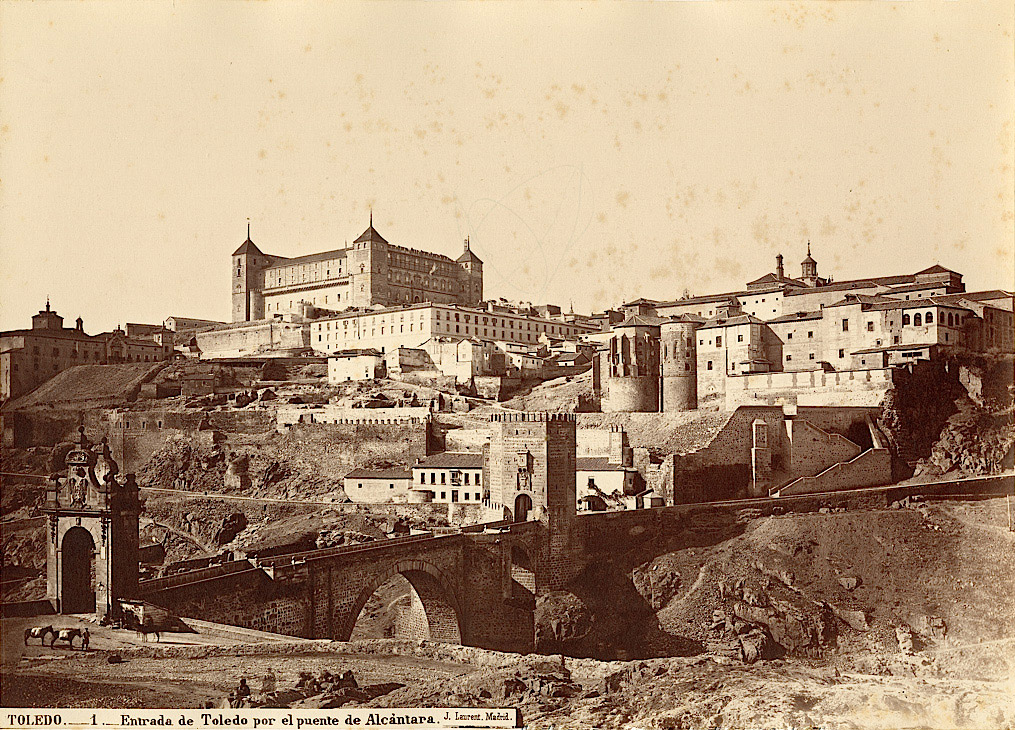
Alcántara Bridge by Juan Laurent, c. 1864–1870, Department of Image Collections, National Gallery of Art Library, Washington, DC

== See also ==
- List of Roman sites in Spain
