= Pola de Somiedo =

Coordinates: 43.1°N 6.25°W

Pola de Somiedo is one of fifteen parishes (administrative divisions) in Somiedo, a municipality within the province and autonomous community of Asturias, in northern Spain with category village ("villa" in Spanish). It is situated at an elevation of 700 m (2,300 ft) above sea level. It is 19 km^{2} (7.3 sq mi) in size, with a population of 242 (INE 2006). The postal code is 33840. It has a total population of 242 inhabitants ( INE 2006 ) in 114 homes. It is the capital city of the council. It celebrates the feast of the Rosary. His temple parish is dedicated to St. Michael .

In 1786 Somiedo Pola was visited by the English writer and researcher Joseph Townsend narrates the following:

Surrounded by about eighty acres of wet meadows, enclosed in limestone rocks of extraordinary height and settled on a small eminence is La Pola de Somiedo, a village of twenty houses. If Shakespeare had been here, his imagination would never have paid attention to the cliffs of Dover. The village, the meadows, the creek, the high and bare mountains are almost perpendicular to its forested hillsides, with goats jumping from rock to rock and cattle grazing peacefully below combine to form a magnificent whole.

== Foundation of La Pola ==
In 1269 by royal decision. Alfonso X promoted and encouraged the creation of "pueblas" or "polas" (small villages in Spanish) and one of them was the Somiedo.

== 21st century ==
It is the capital of the municipality of Somiedo, and as such is the headquarters of the Somiedo Natural Park. After leaving the village and heading to Urria, you can see the Museum of Ethnology, a very interesting museum in its particular topic.

== See also ==
- Teito

== Villages ==
- Castro
- Pineda
- Pola de Somiedo (La Pola)
