= Somiedo Natural Park =

Natural park and protected area in Spain

Coordinates: 43°06′N 6°15′W

- Parque Natural de Somiedo
- IUCN category V (protected landscape/seascape)
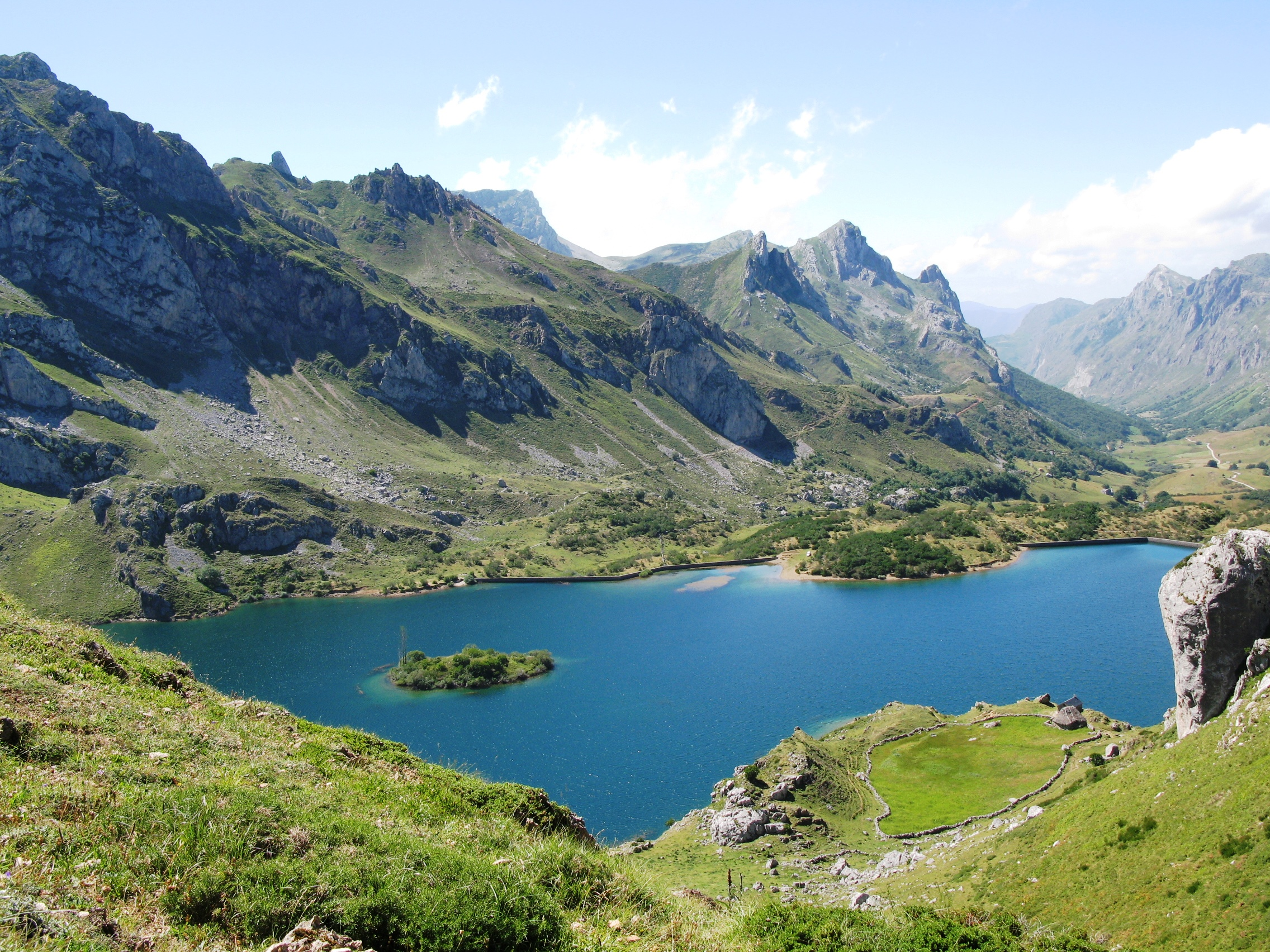
- Lake in the natural park
- Interactive map of Somiedo Natural Park
- Location: Spain
- Area: 39,164 ha (96,780 acres)
- Established: 1988
- Governing body: Principality of Asturias

Somiedo Natural Park (Spanish: Parque Natural de Somiedo) is a protected area located in the central area of the Cantabrian Mountains in the Principality of Asturias in northern Spain. As well as being designated a natural park, it is protected as a Special Area of Conservation, and as one of a number of Biosphere Reserves in the Cantabrian mountains.(see note^{1})

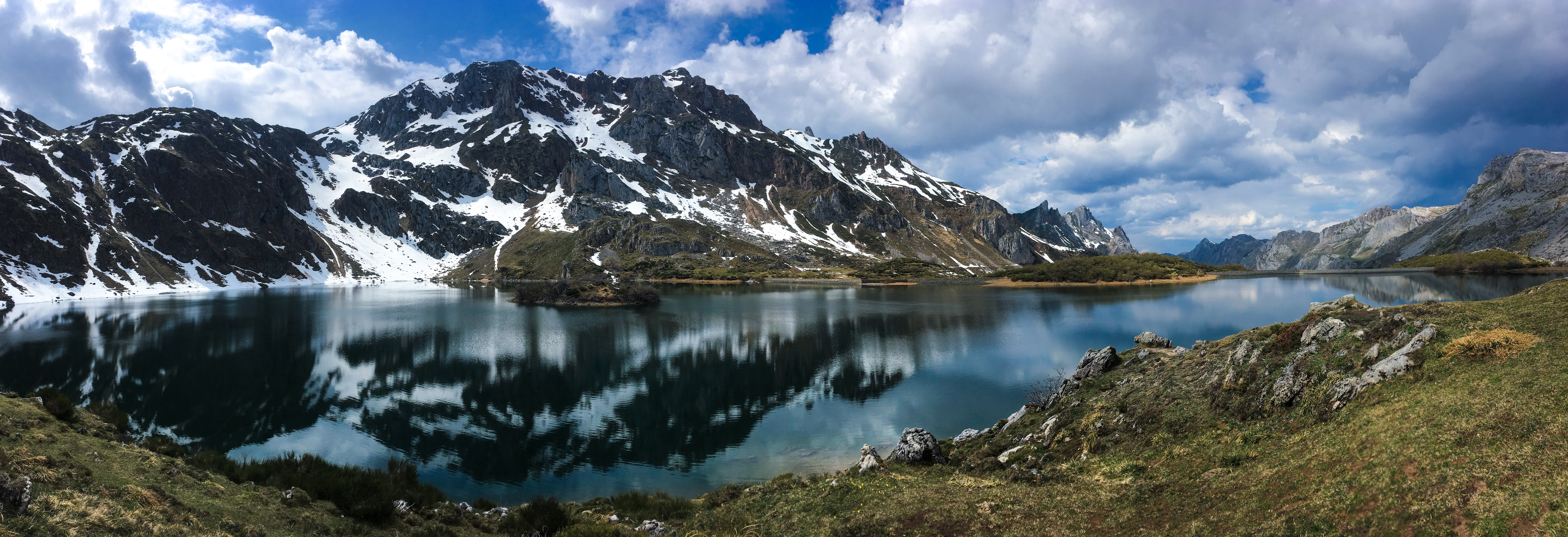
Lake in the Somiedo valley

It covers 39,164 hectares, corresponding geographically with the municipality of Somiedo, which is completely included in the park, as well as the municipalities of Belmonte and Teverga.

== Natural monument ==
Lakes in the park have been designated a natural monument, the Conjunto Lacustre de Somiedo.

== Human activity ==
The farming methods traditional to the area are regarded as an example of sustainable living, and were a factor in UNESCO's designation of the park as a Biosphere Reserve in 2000. Of particular interest is the braña, a traditional system of livestock herding based on transhumance, which makes use of high pastures for summer grazing. There is interest in preserving the traditional buildings of the brañas not only for farming purposes but also as a tourist attraction.

UNESCO is considering the inclusion of Somiedo in a World Heritage Site, for which transhumance would be one of the defining characteristics.

== Fauna ==
=== Cantabrian brown bear ===
The park is a stronghold of the Cantabrian brown bear. In 2009 the Spanish newspaper El País referred to Somiedo with its 30 bears as the Spanish Yellowstone. The Fundación Oso Pardo (FOP) opened an interpretation centre in October 2011 called “Somiedo y el Oso” in Pola de Somiedo.

The total number of bears in Spain is small and the government classes them as endangered. The bears' future is put at risk by fragmentation of their habitat in the Cantabrian Mountains. A need has been identified to develop wildlife corridors specifically for bears using appropriate vegetation and initiatives to promote co-existence with human inhabitants of the mountains. The European Union's LIFE Programme has provided funding for a corridor linking the natural park via Leitariegos to another area of bear habitat.

=== Birdlife ===
The European Union designated the park a Special Protection Area for birds in 1989. Birds include the Cantabrian capercaillie. The number of capercaillies in the park has declined significantly, but there are efforts to reverse the decline via a recovery plan for the subspecies. The plan, which operates across a number of SPAs, has been supported by the LIFE Programme.

The natural park is also part of an Important Bird Area, called Babia-Somiedo.

== See also ==
- Picos de Europa National Park

== Notes ==
1.The possibility of managing these biosphere reserves together as a "super-reserve" (to be called Gran Cantábrica) has been under discussion: integration would benefit the management of some species of wildlife.
