= Premio al Pueblo Ejemplar de Asturias =

Award granted to stand-out Asturian villages

Premio al Pueblo Ejemplar de Asturias (in English: Exemplary Town of Asturias Award, in Asturian: Premiu al Pueblu Exemplar d'Asturies) is an award granted since 1990 Fundación Princesa de Asturias de Asturias to the Asturian village who stand out in "defense of their noblest values, their natural or ecological environment, their historical, cultural or artistic heritage. This award is conceived within the Princess of Asturias Awards.

== List of winners ==
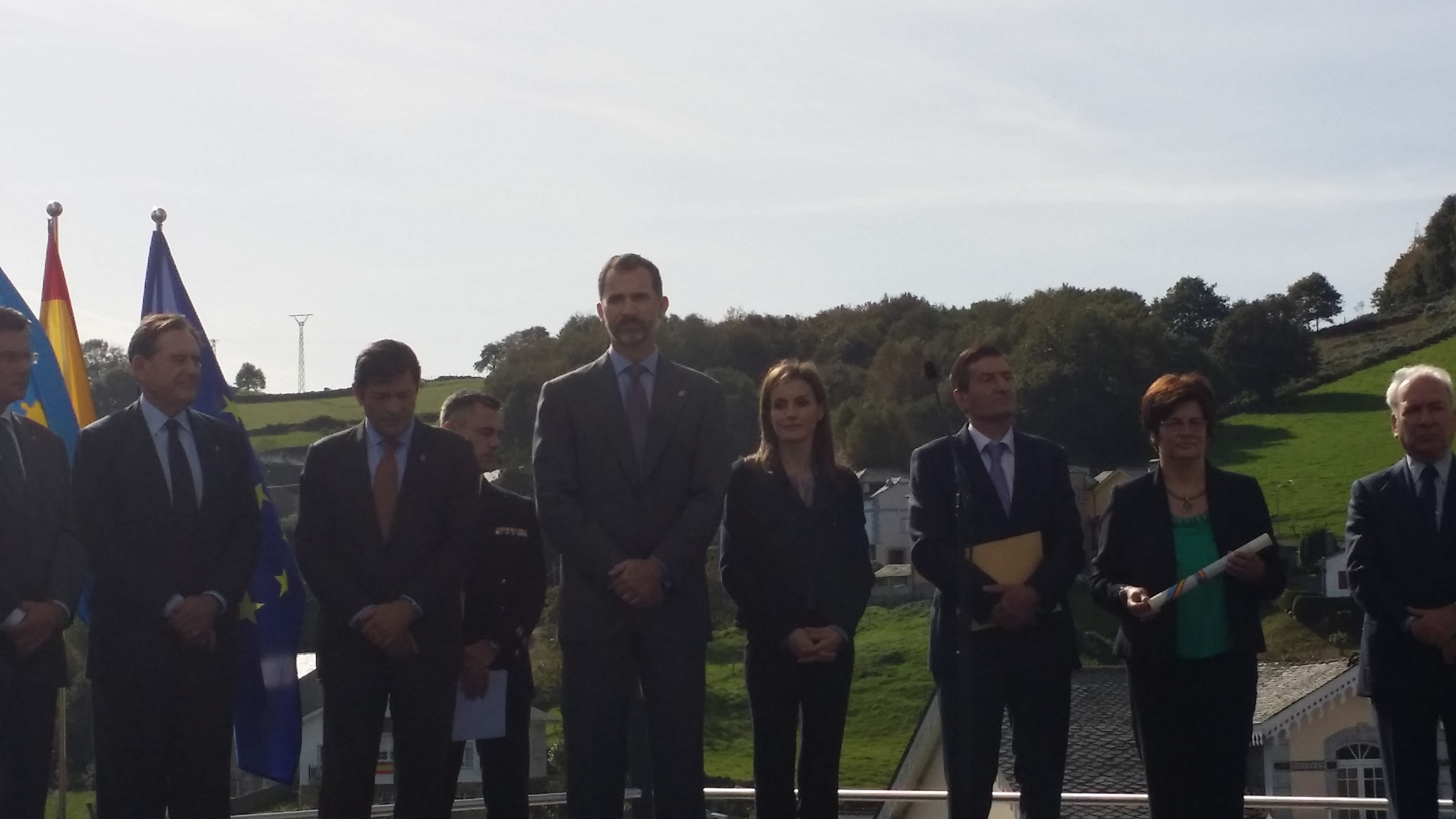
King Felipe VI of Spain in Boal 2014.

Year	Village	Town Council
2026	Cofradía de Pescadores Santa Ana, Llanes	Llanes
2025	Valdesoto	Siero
2024	Sotres	Cabrales
2023	Arroes, Pion and Candanal	Villaviciosa
2022	Cadavéu	Valdés
2021	Santa María del Puertu	Somiedu
2019	Asiegu	Cabrales
2018	Mual	Cangas del Narcea
2017	Poreñu	Villaviciosa
2016	Comarca de Los Oscos	Santa Eulalia de Oscos, San Martín de Oscos y Villanueva de Oscos
2015	Colombres	Ribadedeva
2014	Movimiento Asociativo y Vecinal de Boal	Boal
2013	Comunidad Vecinal de Teverga	Teverga
2012	Bueño	Ribera de Arriba
2011	San Tirso de Abres	San Tirso de Abres
2010	Lastres	Colunga
2009	Comunidad vecinal de Sobreescobio	Sobrescobio
2008	Torazo	Cabranes
2007	Sociedad Humanitarios de San Martín y Pueblo de Moreda	Aller
2006	Comunidad vecinal de Sariego	Sariego
2005	Porrúa	Llanes
2004	Villar de Vildas	Somiedo
2003	Navelgas	Tineo
2002	Hermandad de La Probe y Comunidad de La Foz de Morcín	Morcín
2001	Valle y parroquia de Paredes	Valdés
2000	Tuña	Tineo
1999	Comunidad Vecinal y Educativa de Ibias	Ibias
1998	Xomezana y Valle del Huerna	Lena
1997	Castropol	Castropol
1996	Comunidad Vecinal de Nava	Nava
1995	Puerto de Vega	Navia
1994	Pastores de los Picos de Europa	Amieva, Cabrales, Cangas de Onís y Onís
1993	Comunidad Vecinal de Grandas de Salime	Grandas de Salime
1992	Soto de Luiña y Novellana	Cudillero
1991	Asociación de Amigos del Paisaje de Villaviciosa	Villaviciosa
1990	San Esteban de Cuñaba	Peñamellera Baja
