= Santa María del Puertu =

Parish of Somiedo, Asturias, Spain

Coordinates: 43.033333°N 6.216667°W

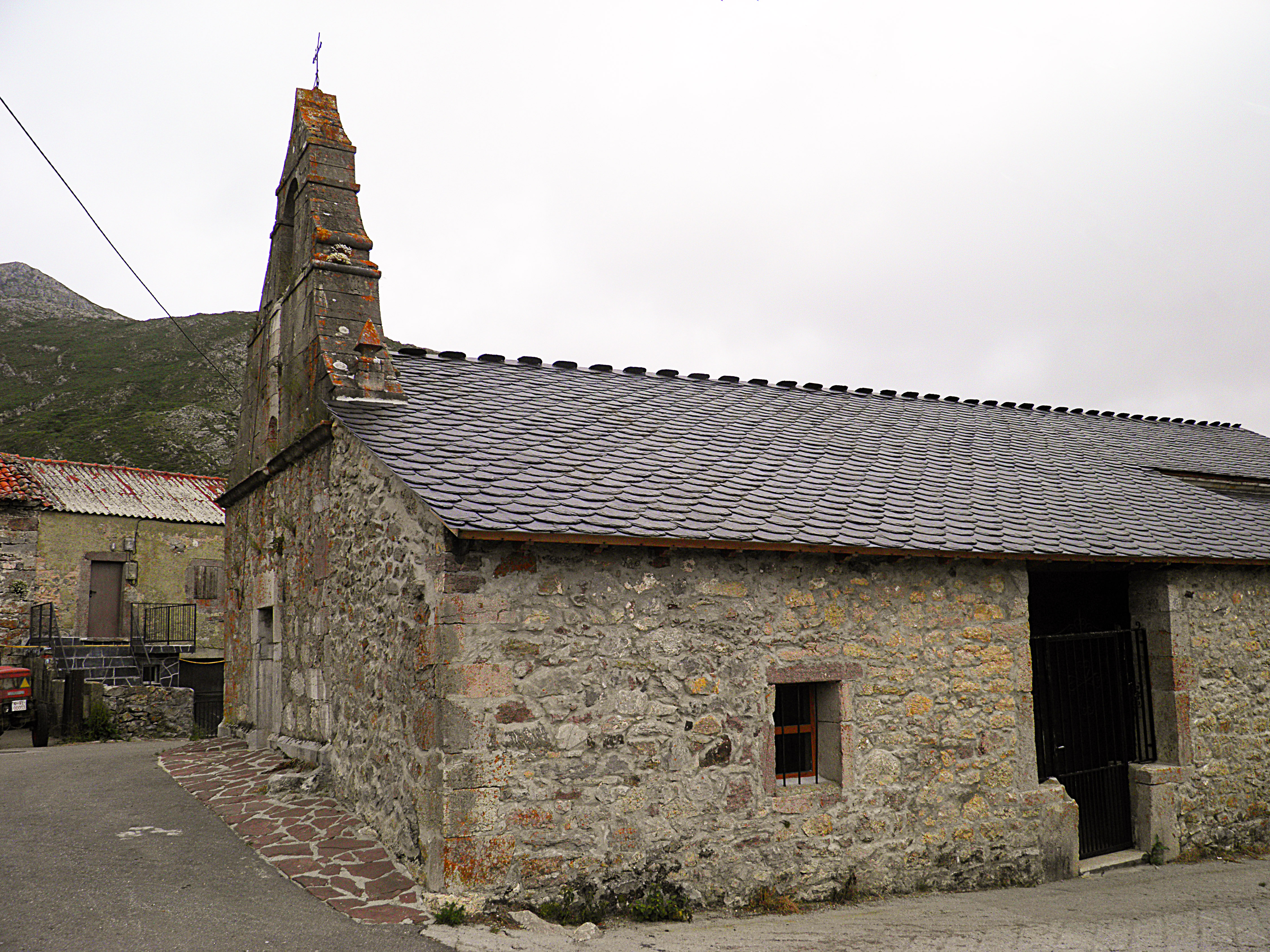
Santa María del Puertu (Somiedo, Asturias)

Santa María del Puertu is one of fifteen parishes (administrative divisions) in Somiedo, a municipality within the province and autonomous community of Asturias, in northern Spain.

It is situated at an elevation of 1,486 m (4,875 ft) above sea level. It is 10.96 km^{2} (4.23 sq mi) in size, with a population of 84 (INE 2006). The postal code is 33840.

On September 2, 2021, the jury of the Princess of Asturias Awards granted Santa María del Puertu the Exemplary Town of Asturias Award.

== See also ==
- Exemplary Town of Asturias Award
