= Jurassic Museum of Asturias =

Museum in Asturias, Spain

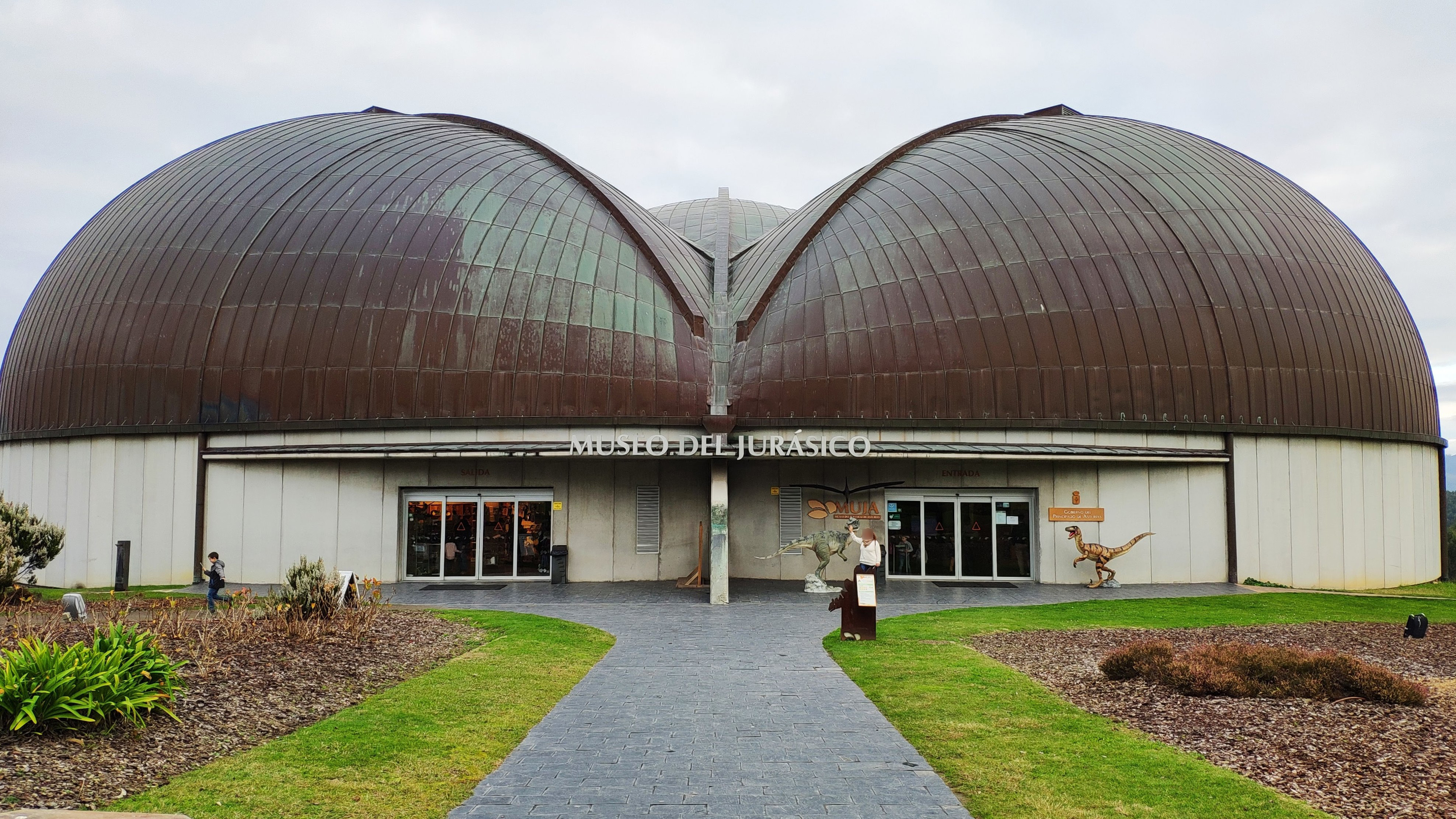
- Exterior view of Jurassic Museum of Asturias

- Location of MUJA in Asturias in Spain
- Established: March 2004
- Location: Principality of Asturias File:Flag of Asturias.svg
- Coordinates: 43.501897°N 5.274769°W
- Type: Palaeontology of Mesozoic divisions of Cretaceous, Jurassic, and Triassic periods
- Visitors: Over 1 million
- Website: Official website

The Jurassic Museum of Asturias (Spanish: Museo del Jurásico de Asturias; MUJA) is located in the area of Rasa de San Telmo near the parish (administrative division) of Llastres in the municipality of Colunga, Asturias, Spain. Though the municipality of Ribadesella was initially proposed, Colunga was chosen for the building site in the late 1990s. Several landmarks are visible from the museum including the Bay of Biscay, the Sierra del Sueve, and the Picos de Europa. Strategically located over a mount on the Rasa de San Temo, the museum is in the midst the Jurassic Asturias.

The museum displays and collections cover 3,500 million years, and although they emphasize the three stages of the Mesozoic (Triassic, Jurassic and Cretaceous), information is also presented on the preceding and subsequent periods. Different stages of the Jurassic geologic period and system are on display. Corridors contain over 20 dinosaur replicas; measuring over 12 metres (39 ft) in height, their weight would exceed ten tons if the replicas were real. A rich collection of footprints and fossils found in the Asturian Jurassic coastline from ten paleontological sites are exhibited in the exposition halls and are said to be "the most complete informative and representative collection of dinosaur remains in the world."

Founded March 31, 2004 and representing an investment of 12 million euros, MUJA belongs to the Asturian network of public museums. The museum's goal is to illustrate the factors involved in the composition of life on Earth. The palaeontologist José Carlos García-Ramos from the University of Oviedo leads the museum's scientific team.

== Geography ==
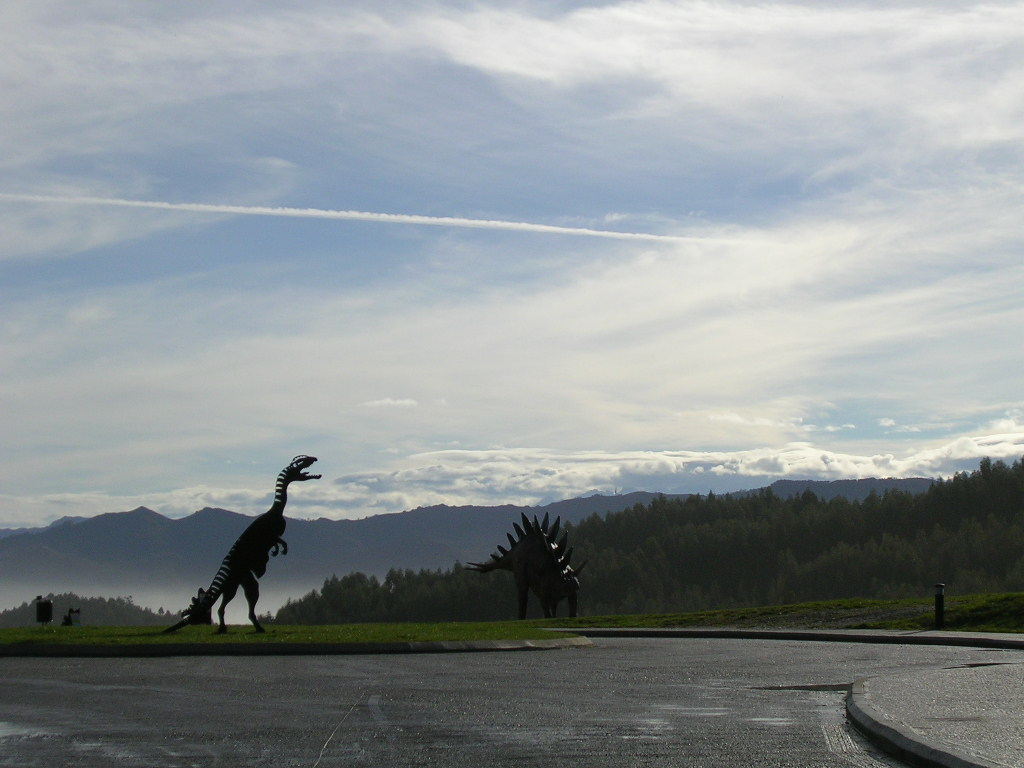
Exhibits of dinosaurs outside the museum.

The museum is located close to the coastline of the Cantabrian Sea and Llastres, a fishing port. It is bounded by the Sierra del Sueve on the south and the Picos de Europa towards the east. MUJA is on the branch road AS-257 towards Llastres, about 1.5 km away.

During a visit to the cliffs of the coastline between Gijón and Ribadesella in the councils of Villaviciosa, Colunga and Ribadesella of Asturias, which is called the “Coast of Dinosaurs”, dinosaur ichnite deposits were found to be in abundance. Jurassic reptile footprints and bone were unearthed during excavations that started in 2005. Fossils found during these excavations are on display in the museum.

== Architecture ==
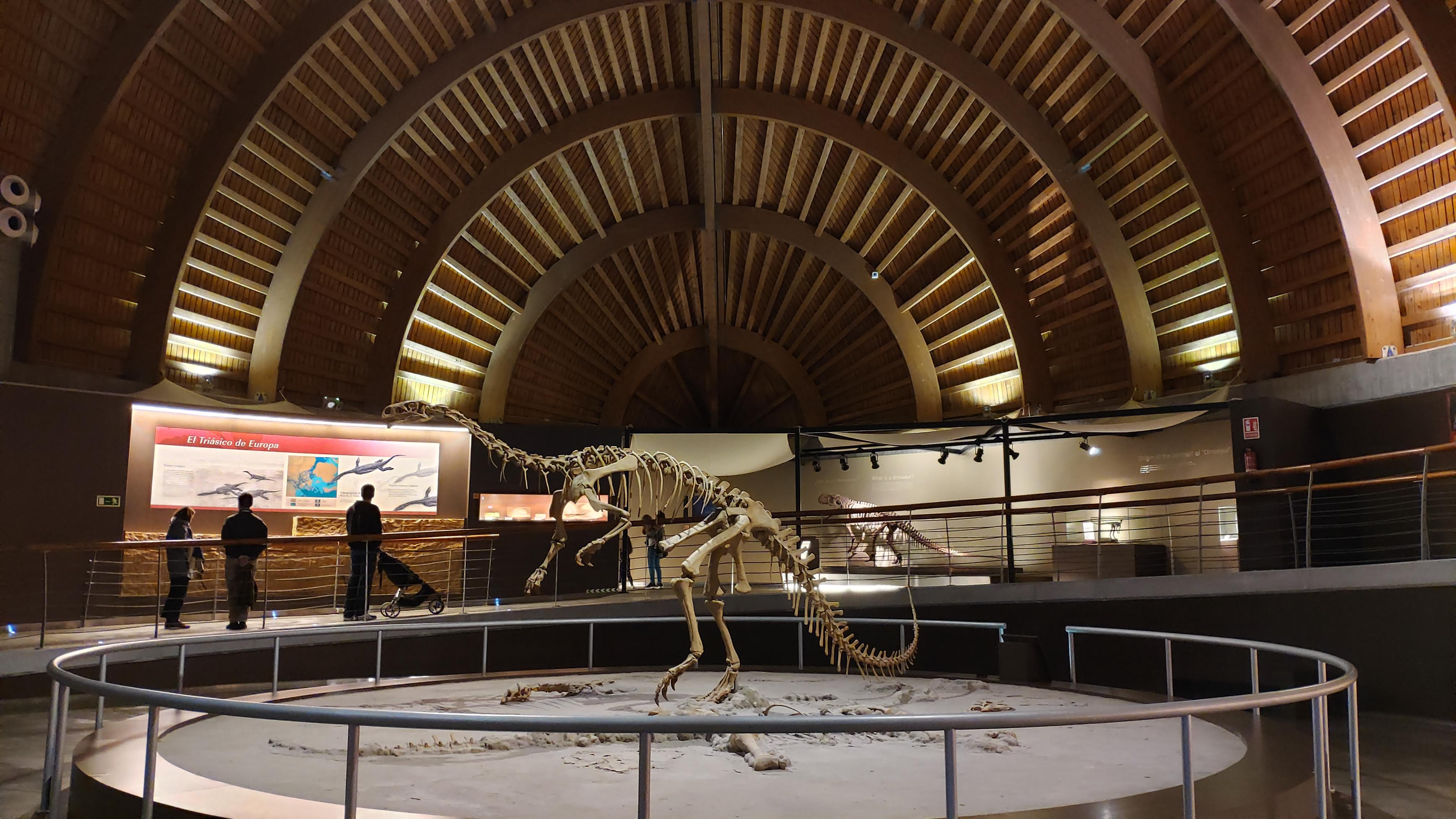
Interior of the museum

The museum, which opened in 2004, was designed by the architect, Rufino Uribelarrea. The building has many special features, particularly the roof, which is in the form of a "fingerprint counter mould kittiwake, feature of the dinosaurs". The building itself is shaped in the form of a giant tridactyl dinosaur footprint. Three ellipsoidal vaults intersect to form the deck space which is a large, open area of 2,500 square metres (27,000 sq ft). The roof structure is made entirely of laminated wood, a plywood. The entire roof is covered with a copper skin plate, which has been described by the European Association for the Development of Architectural Copper as that "it gradually oxidises to dark brown colour, and then, after several years, the typical green patina of aged copper protects the building and its contents for decades, even in the aggressive marine environment."

The first floor, ground floor and basement of the building are 5,000 square metres (54,000 sq ft). Three wide vaults or rooms extend to the ceiling and are divided by the Mesozoic divisions of Cretaceous, Jurassic, and Triassic. The basement houses over 400 tons of fossils that have yet to be classified. The first floor has a temporary exhibition room, a reception room, administration room, and workshops, as well as a library and a laboratory. The ground floor contains a display hall, an audio-visual room and the permanent exposition room, along with an auditorium. The service areas include a store, gardens, cafeteria, and playgrounds.

== Collection ==
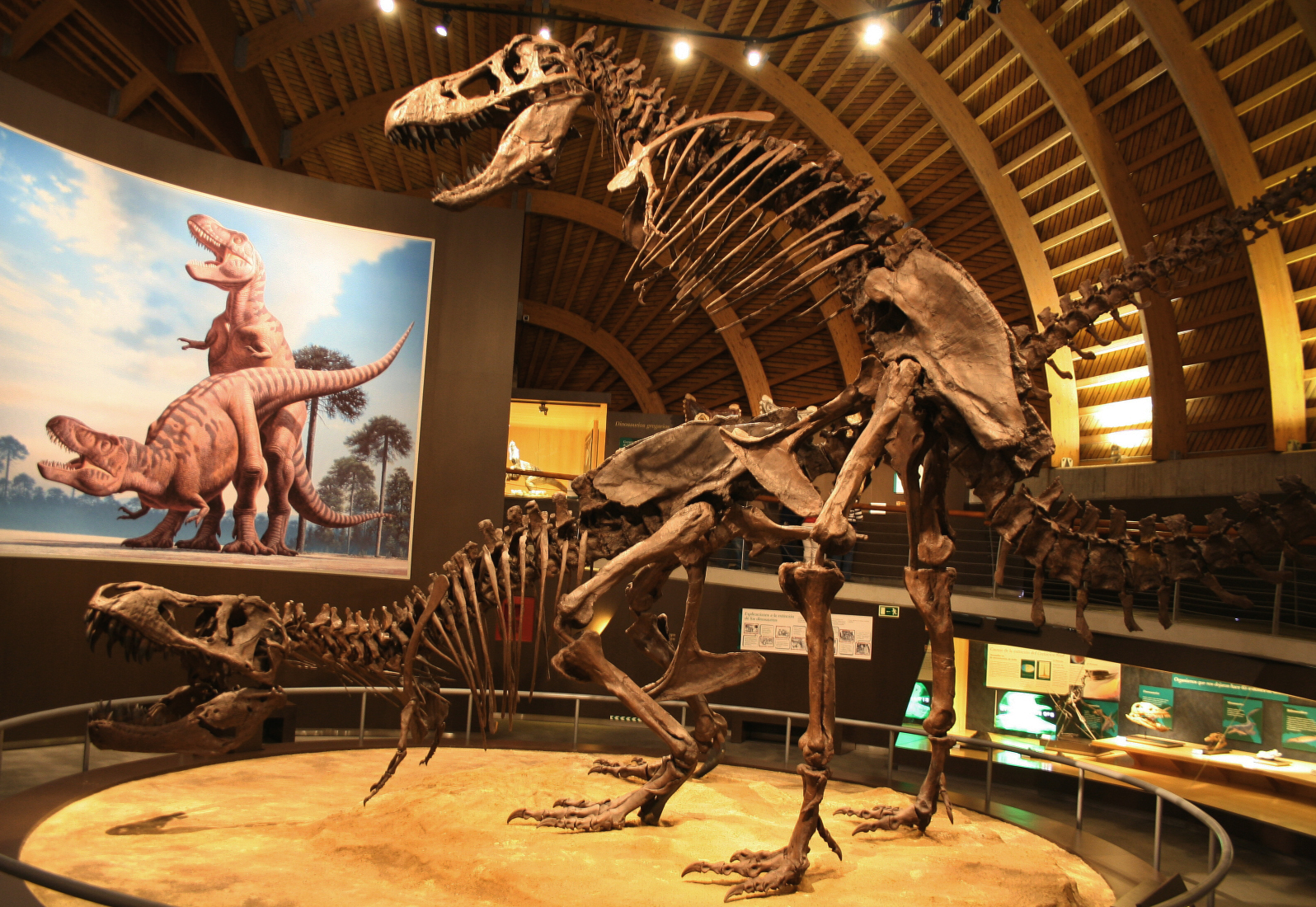
Skeleton casts of Tyrannosaurus mounted in a mating position at the Jurassic Museum of Asturias

MUJA's main collection centres around 8,000 fossils from Asturias' Jurassic period. Divided into four sections, one contains 150 traces from the coast; another has 200 fossils of dinosaurs, crocodiles, fish, and tortoises; the third has 103 vegetable fossils and eleven tree trunk fragments; and the last has approximately 6,000 invertebrate fossils. A module explains the geological history of Asturias, focusing on the Jurassic Coast and the marine levels that formed the city of Gijón. Some of the replicas include a pair of copulating Tyrannosaurus rex, as well as a Giganotosaurus, one of the largest known carnivorous dinosaurs. A sickle-clawed Deinonychus is also featured. Quintueles, Oles, and Tazones specimens are housed at the MUJA.

The largest of the finds from the Coast of Dinosaurs include the 82 centimetres (32 in) long footprint of a theropod dinosaur, and the smallest ichnites of sauropod dinosaurs at about 12 centimetres (4.7 in) length. Collections in the museum from the coastal finds also include 255 specimens of dinosaur ichnites. Martin Lockley, a palaeontologist of the University of Colorado Denver, states that “the collection of ichnites of the MUJA represents one of the most complete worldwide”.

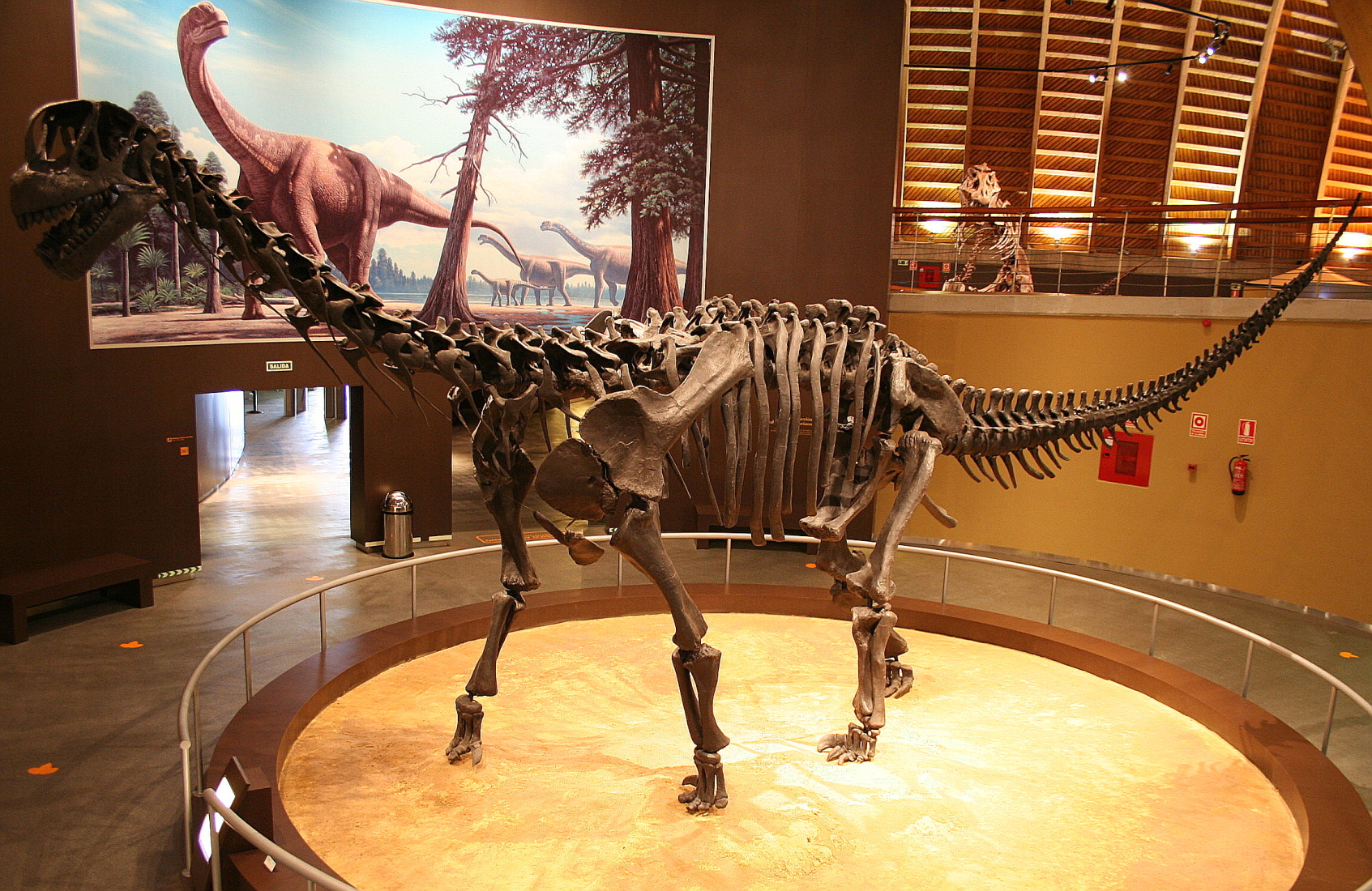
A Camarasaurus skeleton cast in MUJA

The collection of vertebrates of the Jurassic period is unique. Some of the specimens on display in the museum are an incomplete skeleton of a marine crocodile, a piece of the jaw of a small ichthyosaur, a 1.25 metres (4 ft 1 in) long brachiosaurid ulna specimen(equivalent to the cubitus bone), the partial skeleton of a stegosaur, several bones of plesiosaurs, bone remnants of sea turtles (including several shells), and also specimens of several partial fish. Also on display are Jurassic fossil plants.

Triassic hall

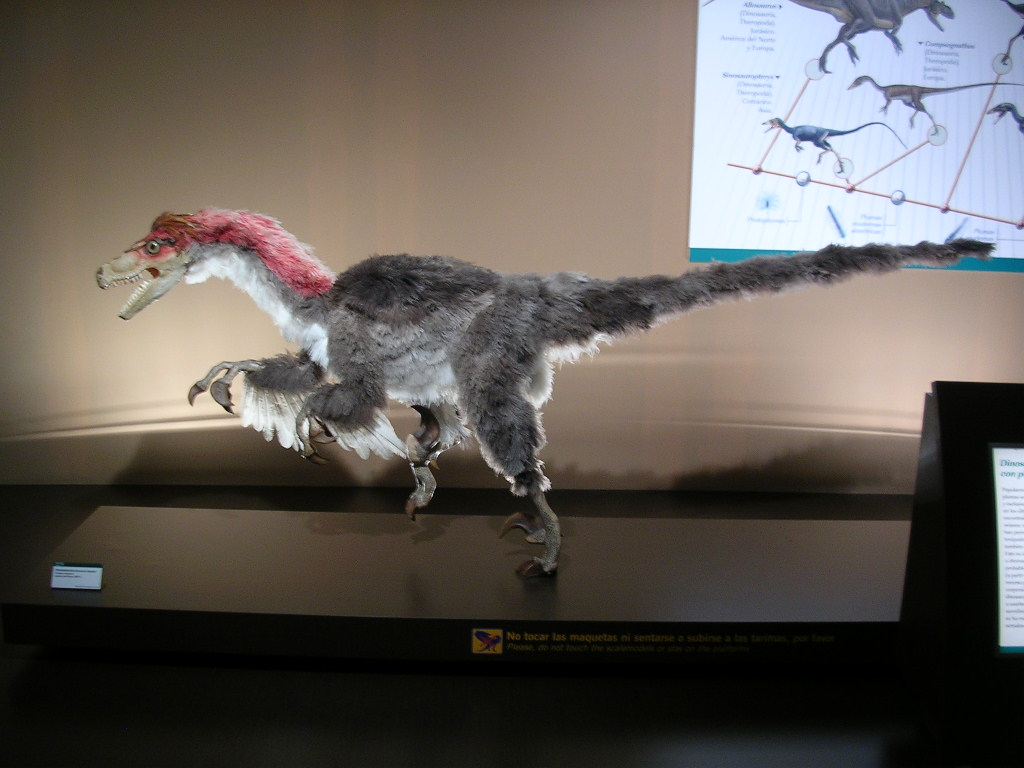
Feathered reconstruction of Velociraptor

In the Triassic hall, there are exhibits of dinosaurs as they first appeared in the Triassic period, 251 to 200 million years ago. The dinosaur reconstructions on display here include bones and footprints or ichnites. Also shown are the gastroliths (stones swallowed by some dinosaurs to crush food in their stomachs), coprolites (fossilized dung), eggs and nests. The prosauropod Plateosaurus is the largest on display here.

Jurassic hall

The Jurassic period, representing the intermediate period of the Mesozoic from 200 and 145 million years ago, considered by some as the golden age of the dinosaurs, is represented in the Jurassic hall, which contains large sauropods. The display has a unique representation through a cladogram which defines the features of the major groups of the period. Information on display relates to anatomical features such as weight, neck bonding, arm musculature, circulatory system and the relative size of the skull.

Types of dinosaurs

The theropod’s predatory aspects are shown in the form of their teeth and claws. Thyreophorans exhibits depict their defensive anatomical features against predators in the form of bone shields, spikes, and tail clubs. Camarasaurus, a large sauropod dinosaur found in central and western United States, is exhibited as it was fossilized in death. The exhibit dedicated to ornithopods is centered on the morphological characteristics most related to their herbivorous diet; namely, a toothless snout, dental batteries, mobile skull bones, and development of cheeks and presence of hooves on their feet. Marine Jurassic vertebrates are exhibited in the central hall alongside large reptiles such as ichthyosaurs and plesiosaurs, crocodiles and fish. The skeletons of an ichthyosaur, a fish-shaped reptile akin to a dolphin, and of a sea lily or crinoid are also on display in separate cabinets.

Pre-Mesozoic

In the Pre-Mesozoic hall, the exhibits relate to the time from the creation of the Earth 4500 million years ago to the Palaeozoic age, 251 million years ago with displays of the first organisms on Earth, the evolution process of fossils and their dating, classification of the vertebrates and their inherited relations, and the extinction of nearly 95% of life on Earth by end of the Palaeozoic period.

Cretaceous period

In the hall representing the Cretaceous period, the last period of the Mesozoic era from 145 to 66 million years ago, the displays relate to the biological and social habits of dinosaurs, and the causes for their extinction at the end of the Cretaceous period, attributed to meteorite impact, volcanic eruptions and intense geographic and climatic changes. Evolution of birds from feathered theropod dinosaurs are represented by the Archaeopteryx (a prehistoric bird) and dinosaurs such as the Deinonychus or the Dromaeosaurus.

Post-Mesozoic period

Post-Mesozoic, representing the last 66 million years, starting with the extinction of a major part of the dinosaurs, is the Tertiary period when reptile, mammals and modern faunas evolved in that order. A Cantabrotherium truyolsi represents the deposit of Llamaquique, in Oviedo. A touch screen display provides a complete history of the last 66 million years of the evolution of the landscape and ecosystems of Earth. The replica of a skull, No. 5, dated to 300,000 years, is an exhibit in the hall of the Quaternary period. Displays in this hall also cover the decline of the brown bear habitat in the north of the Iberian Peninsula over 500 years and the skull of a cave bear.

Temporary exhibitions

In the basement of the museum, there is a 300 square metres (3,200 sq ft) hall where temporary exhibitions are held on different themes. Past shows were on the themes of Asturias, Natural Paradise, the Great Adventure of Dinosaurs, European Rupestrian art, the Coast of Dinosaurs, Trapped in Ice, Jurassic Colossus, and 2010 Biodiversity.

== Publications ==
Publications include a handheld guide, promotional brochure, guide activities and educational programs, educational and recreational, a guide to the Dinosaur Coast and guide to "Discovering the MUJA children for children".

== Educational workshops ==
Educational workshops on the interpretation of palaeontology are a special feature of the museum which are designed for education of children and young people. It caters to individuals in the age group of 4 to 11. The museum's scientific team organized the 7th Geological Heritage Meeting of the Geological Society of Spain, the 24th Spanish Palaeontological Society Meeting, and the 5th Spanish Jurassic Congress. The 11th International Ichnofabric Workshop was held in 2011 in MUJA.
