= Princess of Asturias Awards =

Annual prizes awarded in Spain

- Country: Spain
- Presented by: Leonor, Princess of Asturias, on behalf of the Princess of Asturias Foundation
- Formerly called: Prince of Asturias Awards (1981–2014)
- Rewards: €50,000, diploma, sculpture and pin
- First award: 3 October 1981; 45 years ago
- Number of laureates: 345 prizes awarded to 482 individuals and organizations (as of 2026)
- Website: www.fpa.es/en/princess-of-asturias-awards/

The Princess of Asturias Awards (Spanish: Premios Princesa de Asturias; Asturian: Premios Princesa d'Asturies), known as the Prince of Asturias Awards from 1981 to 2014, are a series of annual prizes awarded in Spain by the Princess of Asturias Foundation—previously the Prince of Asturias Foundation—to individuals, entities or organizations from around the world who make notable achievements in the sciences, humanities, and public affairs.

The awards are presented every October in a solemn ceremony at the Campoamor Theatre in Oviedo, the capital of the Principality of Asturias, and are presented by the heir to the Spanish throne, currently Leonor, Princess of Asturias. Each recipient present at the ceremony receives a diploma, a sculpture expressly created for the awards by Spanish sculptor Joan Miró and a pin with the emblem of the Foundation. There is also a monetary prize of €50,000 for each category; this amount is shared if the category has more than one recipient.

They were declared of "exceptional contribution to the cultural heritage of Humanity" by UNESCO in 2004.

== Background ==
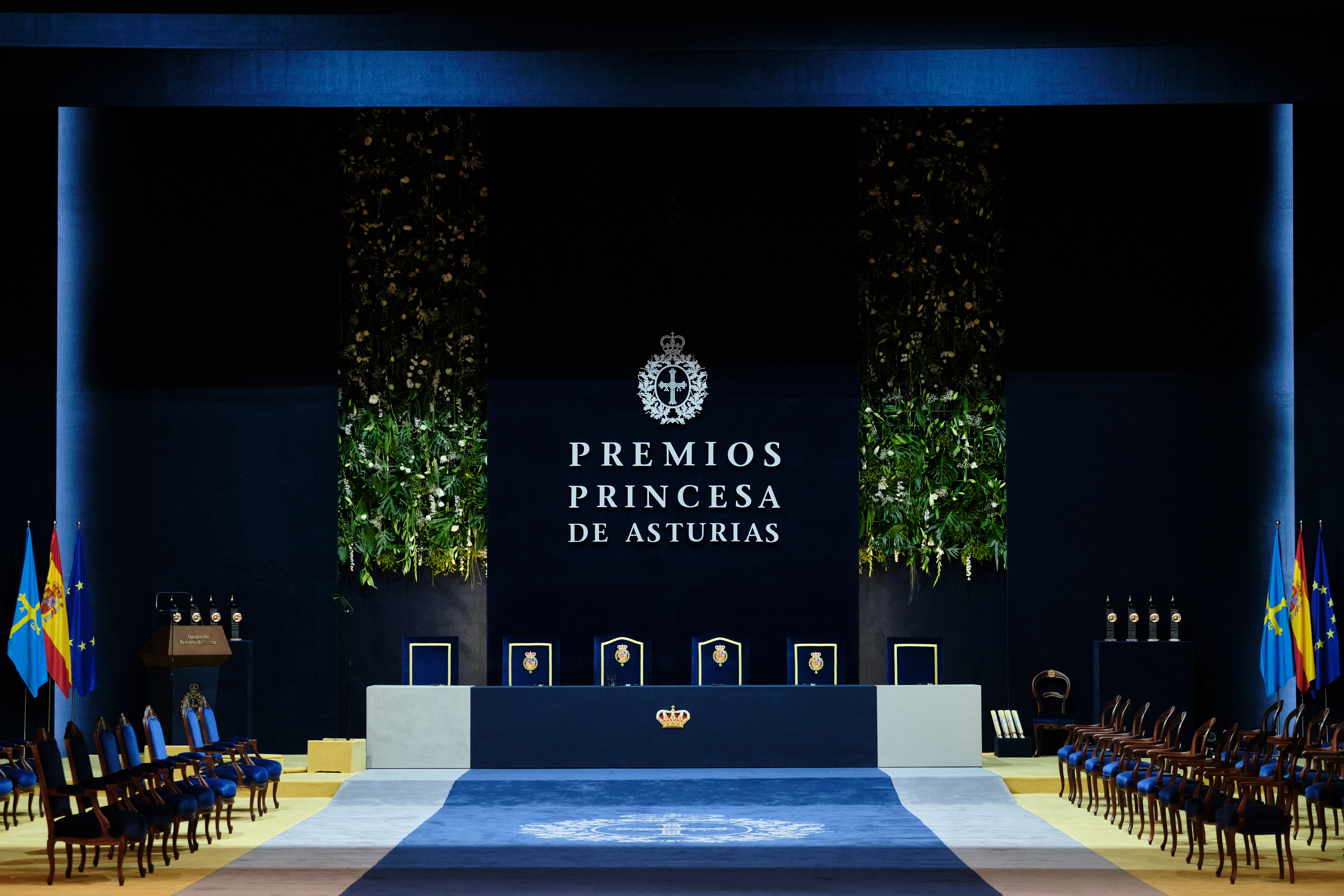
Teatro Campoamor prepared for the 2021 awards ceremony.

The Prince of Asturias Awards were established on 24 September 1980, with the creation of the Prince of Asturias Foundation, in a ceremony presided by Felipe, Prince of Asturias, then heir to the throne of Spain, "to consolidate links between the Principality and the Prince of Asturias, and to contribute to, encourage and promote scientific, cultural and humanistic values that form part of mankind's universal heritage". The first awards ceremony was held on 31 October 1981.

Following Felipe's accession as King of Spain in 2014, the foundation and the awards were renamed to reflect the new heiress presumptive to the Spanish throne, Leonor, Princess of Asturias. King Felipe continued to preside over the awards ceremony until the Princess of Asturias turned 18 (the age of majority for Spanish royal purposes) on 31 October 2023. Princess Leonor first attended the ceremony, handed out awards to winners and delivered her first speech as heiress during the 39th Princess of Asturias Awards Ceremony on 18 October 2019.

If a laureate does not attend to the ceremony to collect their award, they receive neither the sculpture nor the monetary prize, even if the absence is because of force majeure. Only a few laureates have not attended; among them are Bob Dylan, who refused to go to Oviedo in 2007 but asked for the sculpture unsuccessfully, writer Philip Roth in 2012 for medical reasons, and Pau and Marc Gasol in 2015, who were not allowed to attend by their NBA teams.

== Categories and laureates ==
=== Prince or Princess of Asturias Award for the Arts ===
First awarded in 1981, this category is aimed at fostering the art of film-making, theatre, dance, music, photography, painting, sculpture, architecture or any other form of artistic expression.

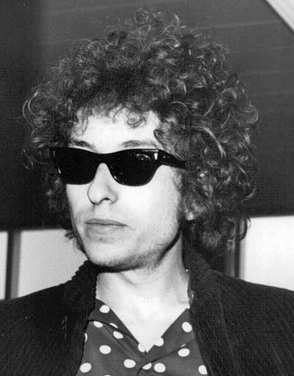
Bob Dylan

- 1981: Jesús López Cobos
- 1982: Pablo Serrano
- 1983: Eusebio Sempere
- 1984: Orfeón Donostiarra
- 1985: Antonio López García
- 1986: Luis García Berlanga
- 1987: Eduardo Chillida
- 1988: Jorge Oteiza
- 1989: Oscar Niemeyer
- 1990: Antoni Tàpies
- 1991: Victoria de los Ángeles, Teresa Berganza, Montserrat Caballé, José Carreras, Pilar Lorengar, Alfredo Kraus, and Plácido Domingo
- 1992: Roberto Matta
- 1993: Francisco Javier Sáenz de Oiza
- 1994: Alicia de Larrocha
- 1995: Fernando Fernán Gómez
- 1996: Joaquín Rodrigo
- 1997: Vittorio Gassman
- 1998: Sebastião Salgado
- 1999: Santiago Calatrava
- 2000: Barbara Hendricks
- 2001: Krzysztof Penderecki
- 2002: Woody Allen
- 2003: Miquel Barceló
- 2004: Paco de Lucía
- 2005: Maya Plisetskaya and Tamara Rojo
- 2006: Pedro Almodóvar
- 2007: Bob Dylan (Note: The laureate did not attend the solemn ceremony to collect the award, so he/she did not receive the sculpture or the economic endowment.)
- 2008: National Network of Youth and Children Orchestras of Venezuela
- 2009: Norman Foster
- 2010: Richard Serra
- 2011: Riccardo Muti
- 2012: Rafael Moneo
- 2013: Michael Haneke
- 2014: Frank Gehry
- 2015: Francis Ford Coppola
- 2016: Núria Espert
- 2017: William Kentridge
- 2018: Martin Scorsese
- 2019: Peter Brook
- 2020: Ennio Morricone (Note: Morricone died before the awards ceremony took place. His son Andrea Morricone collected the award at the ceremony on his behalf.) and John Williams (Note: Due to the COVID-19 pandemic restrictions, the Foundation exempted the laureates from attending the ceremony. The laureate decided not to travel to Oviedo, and even so he/she received the sculpture, pin, diploma and economic endowment.)
- 2021: Marina Abramović
- 2022: Carmen Linares and María Pagés
- 2023: Meryl Streep
- 2024: Joan Manuel Serrat
- 2025: Graciela Iturbide
- 2026: Patti Smith

=== Prince or Princess of Asturias Award for Communication and Humanities ===
First awarded in 1981 for sciences and disciplines considered humanistic activities or any activity related to social communication in any of its forms.

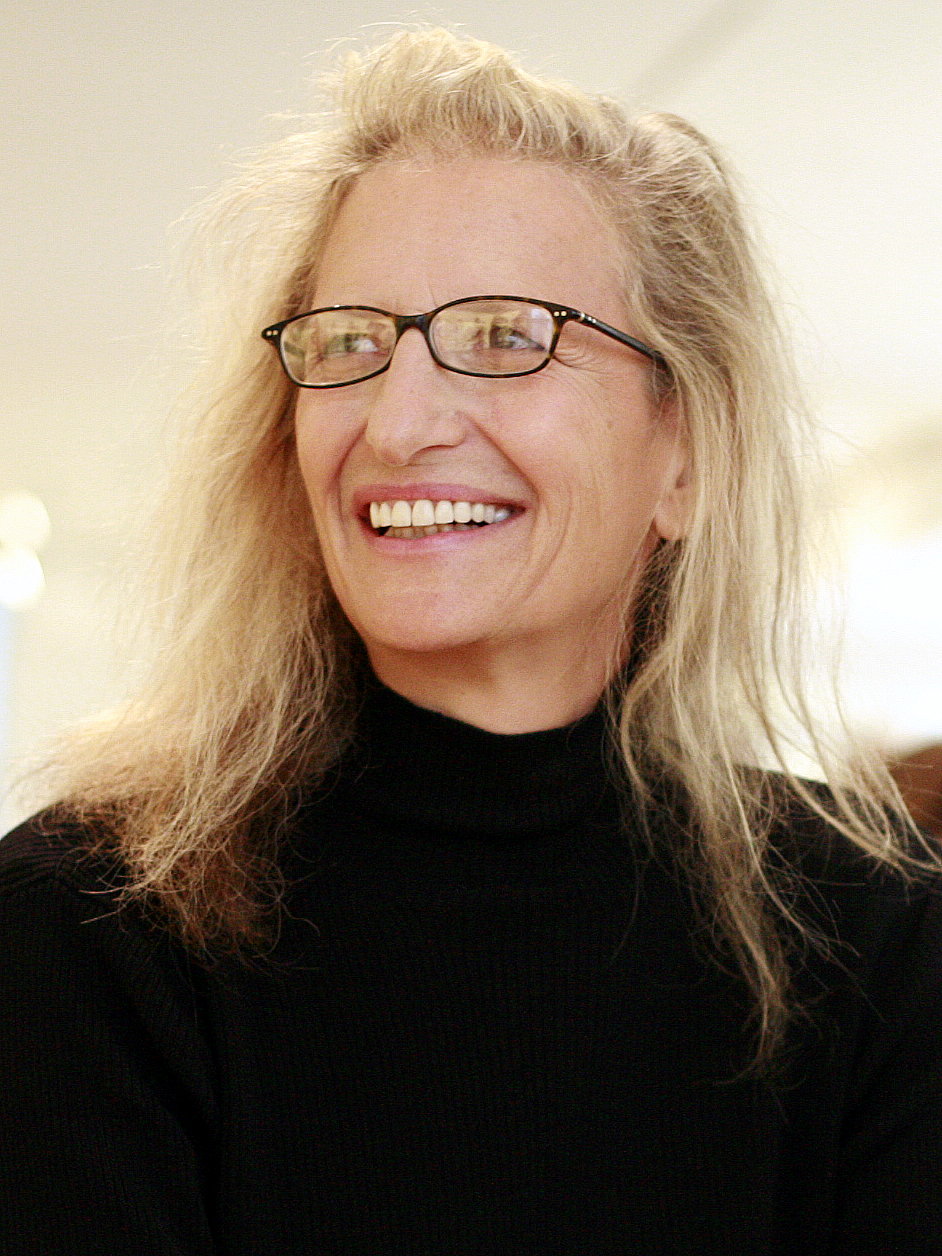
Annie Leibovitz

- 1981: María Zambrano
- 1982: Mario Bunge
- 1983: El País newspaper
- 1984: Claudio Sánchez-Albornoz
- 1985: José Ferrater Mora
- 1986: Grupo Globo
- 1987: El Espectador and El Tiempo newspapers
- 1988: Horacio Sáenz Guerrero
- 1989: Pedro Laín Entralgo and Fondo de Cultura Económica
- 1990: José Simeón Cañas Central American University
- 1991: Luis María Anson
- 1992: Emilio García Gómez
- 1993: Vuelta magazine by Octavio Paz
- 1994: Spanish Missions in Rwanda and Burundi
- 1995: EFE Agency and José Luis López Aranguren
- 1996: Indro Montanelli and Julián Marías
- 1997: Václav Havel and CNN
- 1998: Reinhard Mohn
- 1999: Caro and Cuervo Institute
- 2000: Umberto Eco
- 2001: George Steiner
- 2002: Hans Magnus Enzensberger
- 2003: Ryszard Kapuściński and Gustavo Gutiérrez Merino
- 2004: Jean Daniel
- 2005: Alliance Française, Società Dante Alighieri, British Council, Goethe-Institut, Instituto Cervantes and Instituto Camões
- 2006: National Geographic Society
- 2007: Nature and Science journals
- 2008: Google
- 2009: National Autonomous University of Mexico
- 2010: Alain Touraine and Zygmunt Bauman
- 2011: Royal Society
- 2012: Shigeru Miyamoto
- 2013: Annie Leibovitz
- 2014: Quino
- 2015: Emilio Lledó Íñigo
- 2016: James Nachtwey
- 2017: Les Luthiers
- 2018: Alma Guillermoprieto
- 2019: Museo del Prado
- 2020: Guadalajara International Book Fair and Hay Festival of Literature & Arts
- 2021: Gloria Steinem
- 2022: Adam Michnik
- 2023: Nuccio Ordine (Note: Ordine died before the awards ceremony took place. His partner and his sister, Rosalia Broccolo and Maria Ordine, collected the award at the ceremony on his behalf.)
- 2024: Marjane Satrapi
- 2025: Byung-Chul Han
- 2026: Studio Ghibli

=== Prince or Princess of Asturias Award for International Cooperation ===
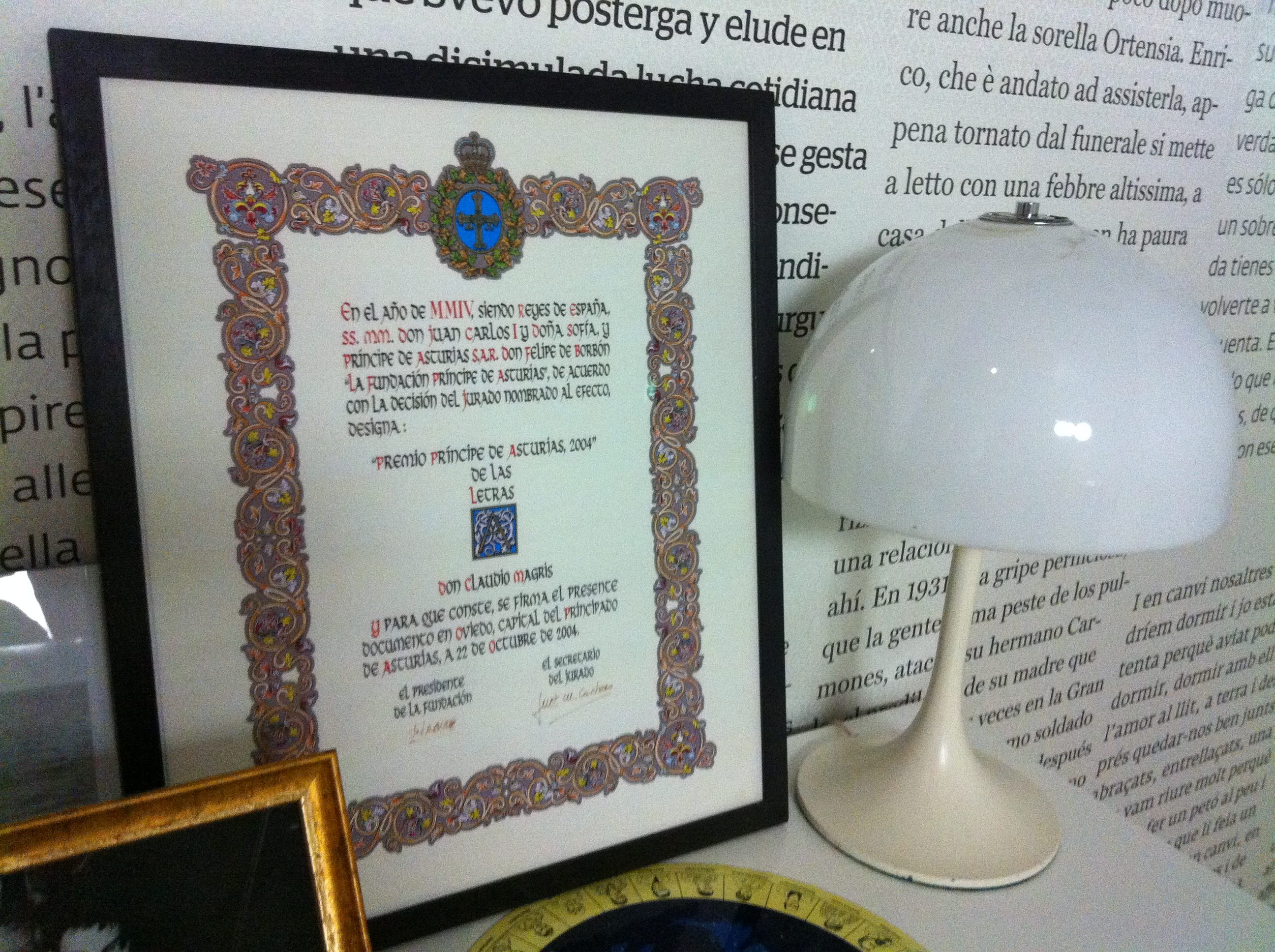
The Award given to Claudio Magris in 2004, shown at the exhibition La Trieste di Magris at CCCB in Barcelona during 2011.

First awarded in 1981 it is aimed at recognizing individual or collective work, in cooperation with another or others, to develop and promote public health, universal education, the protection and defence of the environment, as well as the economic, cultural and social advancement of peoples.

- 1981: José López Portillo
- 1982: Enrique V. Iglesias
- 1983: Belisario Betancur
- 1984: Contadora group
- 1985: Raúl Alfonsín
- 1986: University of Salamanca and University of Coimbra
- 1987: Javier Pérez de Cuéllar
- 1988: Óscar Arias
- 1989: Jacques Delors and Mikhail Gorbachev
- 1990: Hans-Dietrich Genscher
- 1991: UNHCR (United Nations High Commissioner for Refugees)
- 1992: Frederik W. de Klerk and Nelson Mandela
- 1993: United Nations Blue Berets stationed in Ex-Yugoslavia
- 1994: Yitzhak Rabin and Yasser Arafat
- 1995: Mário Soares
- 1996: Helmut Kohl
- 1997: Government of Guatemala and Guatemalan National Revolutionary Unity
- 1998: Emma Bonino, Olayinka Koso-Thomas, Graça Machel, Fatiha Boudiaf, Rigoberta Menchú, Fatana Ishaq Gailani and Somaly Mam
- 1999: Pedro Duque, John Glenn, Chiaki Mukai and Valeri Polyakov
- 2000: Fernando Henrique Cardoso
- 2001: International Space Station
- 2002: The Scientific Committee on Antarctic Research
- 2003: Luiz Inácio Lula da Silva
- 2004: The European Union's Erasmus Programme
- 2005: Simone Veil
- 2006: Bill & Melinda Gates Foundation
- 2007: Al Gore
- 2008: Manhiça Centre of Health Research (Mozambique), Ifakara Health Institute (Tanzania), Malaria Research and Training Centre (Mali) and Kintampo Health Research Centre (Ghana)
- 2009: World Health Organization
- 2010: The Transplantation Society and the Spanish National Transplant Organization
- 2011: Bill Drayton
- 2012: International Red Cross and Red Crescent Movement
- 2013: Max Planck Society for the Advancement of Science
- 2014: Fulbright Program
- 2015: Wikipedia
- 2016: United Nations Framework Convention on Climate Change and the Paris Agreement
- 2017: The Hispanic Society of America
- 2018: Amref Health Africa
- 2019: Salman Khan and the Khan Academy
- 2020: Gavi, the Vaccine Alliance
- 2021: CAMFED, Campaign for Female Education
- 2022: Ellen MacArthur
- 2023: Drugs for Neglected Diseases initiative
- 2024: Organization of Ibero-American States for Education, Science and Culture (OEI)
- 2025: Mario Draghi
- 2026: Svalbard Global Seed Vault

=== Prince or Princess of Asturias Award for Literature ===
First awarded in 1981 it is aimed at recognizing literary creation in all genres.

Year	Image	Laureate	Country	Rationale (Note: The citation for each award is quoted (not in full) from the minutes of the jury in fpa.es, the official website of the Princess of Asturias Foundation. For a full account of the work done by each Prince or Princess of Asturias laureate, please see the biography articles linked from the name column.)	Ref
Prince of Asturias Award for Literature
1981		José Hierro	Spain	"the intense lyrical value of his work, which represents a historical testimony and, at the same time, an ethical attitude, both of which are worthy of public acknowledgement."	
1982		Miguel Delibes	Spain	"the work of each of them, so different from each other and yet, so profoundly expressive about contemporary Spanish reality, observed in very significant spaces, with singular love and fidelity. In both cases their capacity of invention and description has been displayed in a masterful control of the Spanish language, which guarantees their survival in the history of Spanish literature."	
1982		Gonzalo Torrente Ballester	Spain	"the work of each of them, so different from each other and yet, so profoundly expressive about contemporary Spanish reality, observed in very significant spaces, with singular love and fidelity. In both cases their capacity of invention and description has been displayed in a masterful control of the Spanish language, which guarantees their survival in the history of Spanish literature."	
1983		Juan Rulfo	Mexico	"the great aesthetic quality, depth of invention, aptness and expressive novelty, as well as his decisive influence on subsequent narrative in his country and the outstanding place he occupies in the world of Spanish literature as a whole."	
1984		Pablo García Baena	Spain	"for his perseverance in cultivating an independent aesthetic attitude, and for his influence upon new tendencies in Spanish poetry."	
1985		Ángel González	Spain	"because poetry, through his work, survives the scepticism of an epoch with paradoxical tenderness."	
1986		Mario Vargas Llosa	Peru	"his extraordinary gifts as a story-teller, the wealth and variety of his work, filled with the spirit of creative freedom and his mastery of the language."	
1986		Rafael Lapesa	Spain	"his rigorous, constant and profound work in clarifying the history of the Spanish language, as well as his fruitful teaching work in Spain and America."	
1987		Camilo José Cela	Spain	"for the high literary quality of his abundant and universally known work and for his singular importance in Spanish letters this century, which he has influenced considerably, reason which making him undoubtedly deserving of this award."	
1988		Carmen Martín Gaite	Spain	"for her extensive career and recognized merits in the field of contemporary Spanish narrative, within which both she and her work have built a bridge between mid-century realism and the intimacy of the contemporary novel, while paying special attention to the problems of Spanish women of all times."	
1988		José Ángel Valente	Spain	"because his poetry, continually evolving from its initial existential beat to subsequent phenomenological inquiry, is a deep interrogation into the meaning of the world, captured in dense, symbolic language of disturbing beauty, which has made him into one of the finest contemporary Spanish lyricists."	
1989		Ricardo Gullón	Spain	"during a whole life which has been passionately dedicated to the study of Spanish letters, has managed to make his research work transcend the limits of criticism to become a revelation of the mystery of artistic invention in mankind, a highly personal and genuine literary creation, though which, with exemplary mastery, he has known how to make modern Spanish literature known in numerous universities in the United States."	
1990		Arturo Uslar Pietri	Venezuela	"creator of the modern historical novel in Spanish America, whose incessant and fruitful literary activity has greatly contributed to enlivening our common tongue, illuminating the imagination of the New World and enriching the cultural community of the Americas."	
1991		The people of Puerto Rico	Puerto Rico	"to the people of Puerto Rico, whose representative authorities, with exemplary decisiveness, have declared Spanish to be the only official language of their country."	
1992		Francisco Morales Nieva	Spain	"his continual work in renewing the finest Spanish theatrical tradition, his creative power with words and the inventiveness of his scenic spaces."	
1993		Claudio Rodríguez	Spain	"for shedding light upon everyday reality and remaining true to it in his symbolic depth, for his importance in the 50s group of poets and in terms of current young Spanish poetry."	
1994		Carlos Fuentes	Mexico	"for his defence, in his writings, of freedom of imagination and the dignity of thought; for the contribution made by his work to culture and to universal solidarity and progress for the peoples of the world."	
1995		Carlos Bousoño	Spain	"an example of creative development characterised by profound existentialist concerns [...] on criticism in the theory of poetic expression, the study of symbolism and the meaning of literary epochs [...] a bridge between different generations of writers. From a position of fine sensitivity, he has always encouraged the youngest Spanish poetry. His books have had a considerable impact in the university world of recent decades."	
1996		Francisco Umbral	Spain	"a lively and controversial example of complete dedication to literature. His writing is perpetual and has favoured, in many of his narrative fiction books, the subjects of personal and historic memory. A prominent essayist, a brilliant literary journalist who has turned the daily column into a permanent lesson on verbal art [...] excellence of style [...] capable of lyrical flight and of the most forceful satire, which has renewed our literary language."	
1997		Álvaro Mutis	Colombia	"for the originality and intellectual commitment of his poetic and narrative work [...] His literary creation, unanimously recognized as one of the Spanish-speaking world's highest achievements, links the tenets of Magic Realism with the concerns of modern man."	
1998		Francisco Ayala	Spain	"one of the most accomplished intellectual figures of our contemporary literature [...] sociologist, professor in many American universities, memoirist, writer of articles, [...] master in the use of our language. All of his work is characterised by its lucidity, open-mindedness, and delving into the human condition, never afraid of reaching what is at bottom."	
1999		Günter Grass	Germany	"whose literary work in the fields of creative and essay writing, and life-long civic-mindedness and humanism make him an outstanding figure in literature, critical humanism and moral commitment in our times. His writing, of great aesthetic quality, pays passionate service to the values of freedom, and the defence of the weak, and gives decisive backing to the fundamental aspects of modern democratic systems."	
2000		Augusto Monterroso	Guatemala	"His narrative works and essays create a literary universe of extraordinary ethical and aesthetic depth, highlighted by a Cervantine, melancholic sense of humour. His narrative work has changed the short story, and has bestowed upon it a literary intensity and an opening-up towards unprecedented story lines."	
2001		Doris Lessing	United Kingdom	"The Jury thus recognises not only one of the unquestionably major figures of world literature, whose work is the fruit of a lifetime's dedication to the narrative, but also a passionate fighter for freedom who has spared no effort in her commitment to Third World causes, both in her literature and in the personal experience that her eventful life has provided her."	
2002		Arthur Miller	United States	"an undeniable master of contemporary drama who has projected modern day society's fears, conflicts and aspirations through the medium of the theatre, demonstrating his noteworthy independence of spirit and critical sense, and reworking the ever-present lessons in humanism of the best in stage production."	
2003		Fatema Mernissi	Morocco	"Both authoresses share having produced literary works in different genres that are of outstanding quality from an aesthetic point of view, and which confront the essential issues of our times with profound depth of vision; they provide complementary perspectives in a dialogue between cultures."	
2003		Susan Sontag	United States	"Both authoresses share having produced literary works in different genres that are of outstanding quality from an aesthetic point of view, and which confront the essential issues of our times with profound depth of vision; they provide complementary perspectives in a dialogue between cultures."	
2004		Claudio Magris	Italy	"the finest humanistic tradition and the pluralism of early twenty-first century European literature in his work - a multifaceted Europe without frontiers, supportive of others and open to dialogue between cultures. Magris employs a powerful narrative voice in his books to highlight certain niches that constitute a land of freedom within which a yearning takes form: European unity within its historical diversity."	
2005		Nélida Piñón	Brazil	"author of a stimulating body of literary works artistically founded upon reality and recall, as well as upon fantasy and reverie. Furthermore, diverse literary traditions that constitute a unique theory of the mingling of peoples and cultures all merge in her writing."	
2006		Paul Auster	United States	"for the transformation in literature that he has wrought by blending the best of American and European traditions, for the innovation he has brought to narrative style in the cinema, and for integrating a number of devices used by the cinema into literature. Auster has managed to appeal to young readers by exploring new perspectives of reality and by providing an aesthetically pleasing, invaluable account of the problems faced by the individual and by social groups in our times."	
2007		Amos Oz	Israel	"a narrator, essayist and journalist that has contributed towards fashioning the Hebrew language into a brilliant instrument for literary art and for the truthful disclosure of the most dire and universal realities of our time, focussing especially on advocating peace amongst peoples and condemning all forms of fanaticism."	
2008		Margaret Atwood	Canada	"for her outstanding literary work that has explored different genres with acuteness and irony, and because she cleverly assumes the classic tradition, defends women's dignity and denounces social unfairness."	
2009		Ismail Kadare	Albania	"for the beauty and profound commitment of his literary works. Using everyday language which is nonetheless full of lyricism, Ismaíl Kadaré narrates the tragedy of his land, an incessant battleground. Giving life to old myths through new words, he expresses all the grief and dramatic load of conscience. His commitment is rooted in the great literary tradition of the Hellenic world, which he projects onto the contemporary stage as an open condemnation of any form of totalitarianism and in defence of reason."	
2010		Amin Maalouf	France	"who, through historical fiction and theoretical reflection, has managed to lucidly address the complexity of the human condition. Using intense, suggestive language, Maalouf places us in the grand Mediterranean mosaic of languages, cultures and religions to construct a symbolic space for meeting and understanding. Contrary to desperation, resignation or victimism, his work traces a path of its own towards tolerance and reconciliation, a bridge that extends deeply into the shared roots of peoples and cultures."	
2011		Leonard Cohen	Canada	"for a body of literary work that has influenced three generations of people worldwide through his creation of emotional imagery in which poetry and music are fused in an oeuvre of immutable merit. The passing of time, sentimental relationships, the mystical traditions of the East and the West and life sung as an unending ballad make up a body of work associated with certain moments of decisive change at the end of the 20th and beginning of the 21st century."	
2012		Philip Roth	United States	"The narrative work of Philip Roth forms part of the great American novel, in the tradition of Dos Passos, Scott Fitzgerald, Hemingway, Faulkner, Bellow and Malamud. Characters, events and plots form a complex view of contemporary reality torn between reason and feeling, such as the sign of the times and the sense of unease about the present. His literary quality is displayed in his fluid, incisive writing."	
2013		Antonio Muñoz Molina	Spain	"for the depth and brilliance with which he has narrated relevant fragments of his country's history, crucial episodes of the contemporary world and meaningful aspects of his personal experience. A body of work which admirably reveals his condition as an intellectual with a commitment to his time."	
2014		John Banville	Ireland	"for his intelligent, insightful and original work as a novelist, and on his alter ego, Benjamin Black, author of disturbing, critical crime novels. John Banville's prose opens up dazzling lyrical landscapes through cultural references in which he breathes new life into classical myths and beauty goes hand in hand with irony. At the same time, he displays an intense analysis of complex human beings that ensnare us in their descent into the darkness of baseness or in their existential fellowship. Each of his works attracts and delights for his skill in developing the plot and his mastery of registers and expressive nuances, as well as for his reflections on the secrets of the human heart."	
Princess of Asturias Award for Literature
2015		Leonardo Padura	Cuba	"a decidedly contemporary author rooted in tradition; an investigator of both what is considered cultured and what is considered popular; an independent intellectual, with a firm ethical temperament. In Leonardo Padura's vast body of work, which covers all genres of prose, one recourse that characterizes his literary resolve stands out: an interest in listening to people's voices and the lost stories of others. Via his fiction, Padura reveals the challenges and limits involved in the search for truth. An impeccable exploration of history and the ways of recounting it. His work is a magnificent adventure of dialogue and freedom."	
2016		Richard Ford	United States	"His work forms part of the great tradition of the 20th-century American novel. [...] his characters, plots and story lines are defined by an ironic, minimalist sense of epic. The careful attention to detail in his descriptions and his sombre, dense gaze at the daily lives of anonymous, invisible people meld with the desolation and emotions emanating from his stories. All this makes Ford a profoundly contemporary narrator, as well as the great chronicler of the mosaic of interwoven tales that is American society."	
2017		Adam Zagajewski	Poland	"In addition to his reflections on creation and his intense work of memorialization, Zagajewski's poetry validates the ethical sense of literature and in a single, yet diverse voice in his native Polish accent unites Western tradition, all the while reflecting on the sorrows of exile. Careful attention to lyrical imagery, the intimate experience of time and the conviction that a certain brilliance feeds the flame of artistic creation form the inspiration for one of the most exciting poetic experiences of this Europe, heir to Rilke, Miłosz and Antonio Machado."	
2018		Fred Vargas	France	"the originality of her plots, the irony with which she describes the characters, the depth of her cultural insights and her overflowing imagination, which opens up unprecedented literary horizons to readers. Her writing combines intrigue, action and reflection at a pace that recalls the characteristic musicality of fine French prose. In each of her novels, history emerges as a metaphor of an unsettling present. The vicissitudes of time and the exposure of evil are combined in a solid literary architecture, set against a disquieting backdrop that, for the reader's enjoyment, is always solved as a logical challenge."	
2019		Siri Hustvedt	United States	"Her work is one of the most ambitious on today's literary scene. Employing a feminist perspective, she addresses a variety of the facets that sketch a convulsive, disconcerting present. Furthermore, she does so using fiction and the essay, as an intellectual concerned with the fundamental issues of contemporary ethics. Translated into more than thirty languages, her work contributes to interdisciplinary dialogue between the humanities and the sciences."	
2020		Anne Carson	Canada	"In the different areas of her writing, Anne Carson has attained levels of intensity and intellectual standing that place her among the most outstanding of present-day writers. From the study of the Greco-Latin world, she has built a body of innovative poetics in which the vitality of great classical thought acts as a map to invite the reader to elucidate the complexities of the current moment in time. Her oeuvre maintains a commitment to emotion and thought, with the study of tradition and the renewed presence of the Humanities as a way to achieve an enhanced awareness of our time."	
2021		Emmanuel Carrère	France	"Emmanuel Carrère has constructed a highly personal oeuvre that generates a new space for expression which erases the boundaries between reality and fiction. His books contribute to the unmasking of the human condition while relentlessly dissecting reality. Carrère draws an incisive portrait of contemporary society and has exerted a notable influence on the literature of our time, in addition to showing a strong commitment to writing as a vocation inseparable from life itself."	
2022		Juan Mayorga	Spain	"for the tremendous quality, critical insight and intellectual commitment of his oeuvre: action, emotion, poetry and thought. Since his beginnings as a playwright, Mayorga has proposed a formidable renovation of theatre, endowing it with a moral and philosophical concern that challenges our society by conceiving his work as a theatre for the future and for the essential dignity of human beings."	
2023		Haruki Murakami	Japan	"for the uniqueness of his literature, its universal scope and ability to reconcile Japanese tradition and the legacy of Western culture in an ambitious and innovative narrative, which has managed to express some of the great themes and conflicts of our time: loneliness, existential uncertainty, terrorism and dehumanization in big cities, as well as the care of one's body and his own reflections on the creative process."	
2024		Ana Blandiana	Romania	"Ana Blandiana is heir to the most brilliant European traditions, as well as a radically unique creator. Combining transparency and complexity, her writing raises fundamental questions about the existence of human beings, both alone and within society, in the face of nature and of history. Through her indomitable poetry, she has shown an extraordinary capacity for defying censorship."	
2025		Eduardo Mendoza	Spain	"for his decisive contribution to Spanish literature over the past half-century, comprising a compendium of novels that fuse a desire for innovation with the ability to reach a broad-ranging audience and enjoy widespread international acclaim."	
2026		Julian Barnes	United Kingdom	"his standing as an extraordinary storyteller and essayist, endowed with humour and irony, as well as, in his own words, a "melancholic optimism" and "cheerful pessimism". Barnes offers a lucid, warm-hearted and compassionate vision of humankind, using memory as a shaper of identity without renouncing imagination and with love as an essential principle."	

=== Prince or Princess of Asturias Award for Social Sciences ===
First awarded in 1981 it is aimed at recognizing creative and/or research work in the field of history, law, linguistics, teaching, political science, psychology, sociology, ethics, philosophy, geography, economics, demography or anthropology, as well as in the disciplines corresponding to each of these fields.

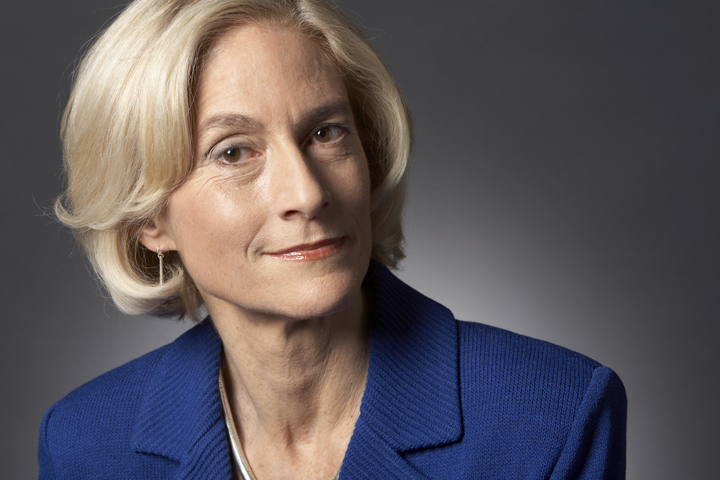
Martha Nussbaum

- 1981: Román Perpiñá Grau
- 1982: Antonio Domínguez Ortiz
- 1983: Julio Caro Baroja
- 1984: Eduardo García de Enterría
- 1985: Ramón Carande Thovar
- 1986: José Luis Pinillos Díaz
- 1987: Juan José Linz
- 1988: Luis Díez del Corral and Luis Sánchez Agesta
- 1989: Enrique Fuentes Quintana
- 1990: Rodrigo Uría González
- 1991: Miguel Artola Gallego
- 1992: Juan Velarde Fuertes
- 1993: Silvio Zavala
- 1994: Aurelio Menéndez Menéndez
- 1995: Joaquim Veríssimo Serrão and Miquel Batllori
- 1996: John H. Elliott
- 1997: Martí de Riquer i Morera
- 1998: Pierre Werner and Jacques Santer
- 1999: Raymond Carr
- 2000: Carlo Maria Martini
- 2001: El Colegio de México and Juan Iglesias Santos
- 2002: Anthony Giddens
- 2003: Jürgen Habermas
- 2004: Paul Krugman
- 2005: Giovanni Sartori
- 2006: Mary Robinson
- 2007: Ralf Dahrendorf
- 2008: Tzvetan Todorov
- 2009: David Attenborough
- 2010: The archaeological team of the Terra Cotta Warriors and Horses of Xi'an
- 2011: Howard Gardner
- 2012: Martha Nussbaum
- 2013: Saskia Sassen
- 2014: Joseph Pérez
- 2015: Esther Duflo
- 2016: Mary Beard
- 2017: Karen Armstrong
- 2018: Michael J. Sandel
- 2019: Alejandro Portes
- 2020: Dani Rodrik
- 2021: Amartya Sen
- 2022: Eduardo Matos Moctezuma
- 2023: Hélène Carrère d'Encausse (Note: Carrère d'Encausse died before the awards ceremony took place. Her son Emmanuel Carrère collected the award at the ceremony on her behalf.)
- 2024: Michael Ignatieff
- 2025: Douglas Massey
- 2026: Timothy Garton Ash

=== Prince or Princess of Asturias Award for Sports ===
First awarded in 1987 it is aimed at recognizing careers which, via the promotion, fostering and advancement of sport and sense of solidarity and commitment, have become an example of the benefits that practising sports can bring to people.

Year	Image	Laureate	Country	Sport	Rationale	Ref
Prince of Asturias Award for Sports
1987		Sebastian Coe	United Kingdom	Athletics	"the exemplary sporting and Olympic career, as well as his personality, representative of the concerns of athletes and his committed participation in promoting sport."	
1988		Juan Antonio Samaranch	Spain	Olympics	"a life-long career dedicated to encouraging Spanish and international sport, especially in an Olympic year in which he managed to overcome enormous difficulties to maintain the universality of the Olympics."	
1989		Severiano Ballesteros	Spain	Golf	"the development of a sporting personality who has managed to reach the position of number one in the world of golf in recent years."	
1990		Sito Pons	Spain	Motorcycle	"exceptional sporting career [...] his personal contribution to anti-drug publicity and the active part he has played in road safety campaigns."	
1991		Sergey Bubka	Soviet Union	Athletics	"His extraordinary sporting development has led him to constantly surpass the successive world records for this event [the pole-vault], ever since he first jumped over 5.85 metres in 1984."	
1992		Miguel Induráin	Spain	Cycling	"His personality, character and temperament, together with his charisma, simplicity and modesty, have always gone hand in hand with his great qualities as a sportsman."	
1993		Javier Sotomayor	Cuba	Athletics	"This charismatic, twenty-six-year-old Cuban athlete is currently the Olympic high-jump champion. He is also World Champion and world record-holder, which he achieved on the 27 June 1993 with a jump of 2.45 m."	
1994		Martina Navratilova	United States	Tennis	"the legendary tennis champion who, with eighteen grand slam titles, has been at the forefront of world tennis for more than a decade."	
1995		Hassiba Boulmerka	Algeria	Athletics	"the sporting values of this athlete and the human values which grace her. Boulmerka is a representative of a country and of a world in which the facilities for playing sports are not the most favourable for women."	
1996		Carl Lewis	United States	Athletics	"besides his impressive list of victories which have led him to be known as the "son of the wind", his exemplary participation in the struggle against doping."	
1997		Spain Marathon team: Abel Antón, Martín Fiz, José Manuel García, Fabián Roncero, Alberto Juzdado and Diego García	Spain	Athletics	"Athletes who, successively, have won the European Championship of 1994 (first, second, third), the 1995 world championships (Martín Fiz), the 1997 world championships (Abel Antón), and the 1997 World Cup, with Abel Antón finishing first; Martín Fiz, second; Fabián Roncero, sixth; and José Manuel García, fifteenth."	
1998		Arantxa Sánchez Vicario	Spain	Tennis	"she is an example of steadfastness and sacrifice and a model to be imitated by professionals the world over. Her human qualities have distinguished her as well."	
1999		Steffi Graf	Germany	Tennis	"She won 22 Grand Slam tournament victories and was leader of the Professional Tennis Players ranking for 377 weeks."	
2000		Lance Armstrong	United States	Cycling	"In the world of sport, the two-times winner of the Tour de France stands for man's struggle to overcome illnesses that in many cases are considered terminal."	
2001		Manuel Estiarte	Spain	Water polo	"a remarkable case in Spanish and world sport, having participated in six consecutive Olympic Games, as well as in the European and World Championships."	
2002		Brazil national football team	Brazil	Football	"winning five World Championships is as important as the grass-roots impact of football in Brazil. Besides being a sport, it is a sentiment and a passion shared by the whole of the Brazilian nation."	
2003		Tour de France	France	Cycling	"one of the world's major sporting events, and has symbolised the grandeur of cycling for one hundred years. From its very inception it has embodied the noblest of values: individual endeavour, teamwork and the will to excel. It has forged sportsmen of legend who continue to live on in our collective memory."	
2004		Hicham El Guerrouj	Morocco	Athletics	"his success represents that of a man who has known how to rebel against misfortune, since winning medals at the highest level of world competition had proved difficult [...] his firm commitment to sport and society and especially to the young and those most in need."	
2005		Fernando Alonso	Spain	Formula One	"succeeded in reaching the pinnacle of his sport after years of self-sacrifice and hardship [...] today he is an example to the youth of Spain and the world in general, for his ongoing career is the outcome of an unshakeable desire to make it to the top."	
2006		Spain men's national basketball team	Spain	Basketball	"This extraordinary generation of players, led by Pau Gasol and coached by José Vicente "Pepu" Hernández, has conveyed to the world, and especially to the young, a renewed thrill in the fostering and nurturing of sports."	
2007		Michael Schumacher	Germany	Formula One	"The career of this sportsman bespeaks the greatest accomplishments achieved in every category [...] His humanitarian values have been acknowledged by numerous worldwide associations."	
2008		Rafael Nadal	Spain	Tennis	"The way he reacts after a victory and the way he highlights the merits of his opponents is particularly admirable. He has also recently established a charitable foundation bearing his name which focuses on social work among disadvantaged groups and cooperation for development."	
2009		Yelena Isinbayeva	Russia	Athletics	"Considered the best pole-vaulter of all times, Yelena Isinbayeva has achieved historic records and has become the only female pole-vaulter ever to clear the 5.00 metre barrier, setting a total of 27 world records in this sport."	
2010		Spain national football team	Spain	Football	"Their exemplary way of understanding football, based on sportsmanship, fair play and teamwork, has brought millions of people together around a team that has made history."	
2011		Haile Gebrselassie	Ethiopia	Athletics	"an extraordinary example of sacrifice and self-improvement [...] His commitment to peace and understanding through sport and his humanitarian and social work in Ethiopia have made him an ethical role model for a whole generation of athletes worldwide."	
2012		Iker Casillas	Spain	Football	"an example of fair play that is admired by all. They have jointly shown a conciliatory attitude that has smoothed out traditional differences between players and supporters."	
2012		Xavi Hernández	Spain	Football	"an example of fair play that is admired by all. They have jointly shown a conciliatory attitude that has smoothed out traditional differences between players and supporters."	
2013		José María Olazábal	Spain	Golf	"Worthy successor to the spirit of the legendary Severiano Ballesteros, the jury has taken into account the commendable capacity to go even further that Olazábal has shown throughout his long and brilliant career, along with his competitive spirit and qualities as a human being admired by all."	
2014		New York City Marathon	United States	Athletics	"This ultimate expression of sport, citizen involvement and the spirit of solidarity is reflected on the first Sunday in November each year in a tradition boasting major media coverage, in which the entire city is infused with collective enthusiasm to run the legendary 42 kilometres and 195 meters."	
Princess of Asturias Award for Sports
2015		Pau Gasol	Spain	Basketball	"two brothers and extraordinary sportsmen who have combined major sporting achievements with exemplary social work."	
2015		Marc Gasol	Spain	Basketball	"two brothers and extraordinary sportsmen who have combined major sporting achievements with exemplary social work."	
2016		Francisco Javier Gómez Noya	Spain	Triathlon	"Besides his brilliant, incontestable track record, the Jury has prized the values of effort and perseverance in the face of adversity and the enormous fortitude and commendable spirit of self-improvement he has shown throughout his career."	
2017		New Zealand national rugby union team	New Zealand	Rugby union	"Having become an icon of the sport worldwide, the All Blacks are also considered an example of racial and cultural integration, conveying values of unity, friendship, solidarity and sportsmanship."	
2018		Reinhold Messner	Italy	Alpinism	"both, through their numerous expeditions to the Himalayas, have accomplished great feats and have marked new milestones, becoming an example and inspiration for new generations of climbers."	
2018		Krzysztof Wielicki	Poland	Alpinism	"both, through their numerous expeditions to the Himalayas, have accomplished great feats and have marked new milestones, becoming an example and inspiration for new generations of climbers."	
2019		Lindsey Vonn	United States	Alpine skiing	"the female skier with the most victories in the history of the Alpine Ski World Cup [...] her commitment to future generations, having established a foundation that bears her name to provide support and guidance to young women via the transmission of educational, sporting and personal development values."	
2020		Carlos Sainz	Spain	Rally	"his exceptional performance as a racing driver throughout an outstanding, diverse and ground-breaking career spanning more than three decades among the elite of his sport [...] voted the best rally driver of all time [...] a great spirit of competitiveness and the will to overcome obstacles combined with effort, discipline and solidarity, which has also been reflected in his constant support for young drivers throughout his long and successful sporting career."	
2021		Teresa Perales	Spain	Swimming	"an icon of the international Paralympic movement. Throughout her long and brilliant career [...] she has established an exceptional track record only comparable to her profound, active and courageous commitment to social issues. As a sportswoman, she epitomises the most admirable sporting values. This award recognizes the effort and ability to overcome obstacles of an entire group worldwide."	
2022		The Olympic Refuge Foundation and the IOC Refugee Olympic Team		Olympics	"for the opportunity they afford athletes in conflict zones and places where human rights are violated, preventing them from being able to perform their sporting and personal activities."	
2023		Eliud Kipchoge	Kenya	Athletics	"as a role model in world athletics and as the best marathon runner of all time [...] he carries out meaningful social work through the foundation that bears his name, which is dedicated to facilitating access to early childhood education and protecting the environment."	
2024		Carolina Marín	Spain	Badminton	"Olympic champion – the first and only non-Asian –, three-time world champion, seven-time European champion (the last one in 2024) and the first European to achieve two consecutive world titles (2014 and 2015), Carolina Marín became, after winning the 2018 World Cup, the first player in the world to win three titles in this competition."	
2025		Serena Williams	United States	Tennis	"Considered one of the greatest tennis players in the history of the sport with an indisputable record of accomplishments [...] Serena Williams has always been a staunch advocate for gender equality and equal opportunities between men and women in sports as well as in society in general."	
2026		Lionel Messi	Argentina	Football	"In addition to his dazzling talent, the Jury has highlighted his exceptional sporting career and his formidable and continued charitable work to promote access to education and health care for the most disadvantaged children. Leo Messi, the player who has won the most titles in the history of football, has also earned the respect and admiration of everyone for his exemplary behaviour on the field and for his consistency, humility and commitment to the team game."	

=== Prince or Princess of Asturias Award for Technical and Scientific Research ===
First awarded in 1981 it is aimed at recognizing the work of fostering and advancing research in the field of mathematics, astronomy and astrophysics, physics, chemistry, life sciences, medical sciences, earth and space sciences or technological sciences, including those disciplines corresponding to each of these fields as well as their related technologies.

- 1981: Alberto Sols
- 1982: Manuel Ballester
- 1983: Luis Antonio Santaló Sors
- 1984: Antonio García-Bellido
- 1985: David Vázquez Martínez and Emilio Rosenblueth
- 1986: Antonio González González
- 1987: Jacinto Convit and Pablo Rudomín
- 1988: Manuel Cardona and Marcos Moshinsky
- 1989: Guido Münch
- 1990: Santiago Grisolía and Salvador Moncada
- 1991: Francisco Bolívar Zapata
- 1992: Federico García Moliner
- 1993: Amable Liñán
- 1994: Manuel Patarroyo
- 1995: Manuel Losada Villasante and Instituto Nacional de Biodiversidad of Costa Rica
- 1996: Valentín Fuster
- 1997: Atapuerca research team
- 1998: Emilio Méndez Pérez and Pedro Miguel Echenique Landiríbar
- 1999: Ricardo Miledi and Enrique Moreno González
- 2000: Robert Gallo and Luc Montagnier
- 2001: Craig Venter, John Sulston, Francis Collins, Hamilton Smith and Jean Weissenbach
- 2002: Lawrence Roberts, Robert E. Kahn, Vinton Cerf and Tim Berners-Lee
- 2003: Jane Goodall
- 2004: Judah Folkman, Tony Hunter, Joan Massagué, Bert Vogelstein and Robert Weinberg
- 2005: Antonio Damasio
- 2006: Juan Ignacio Cirac
- 2007: Peter Lawrence and Ginés Morata
- 2008: Sumio Iijima, Shuji Nakamura, Robert Langer, George M. Whitesides and Tobin Marks
- 2009: Martin Cooper and Raymond Tomlinson
- 2010: David Julius, Baruch Minke and Linda R. Watkins
- 2011: Joseph Altman, Arturo Álvarez-Buylla and Giacomo Rizzolatti
- 2012: Gregory Winter and Richard A. Lerner
- 2013: Peter Higgs, François Englert and European Organization for Nuclear Research CERN
- 2014: Avelino Corma Canós, Mark E. Davis and Galen D. Stucky
- 2015: Emmanuelle Charpentier and Jennifer Doudna
- 2016: Hugh Herr
- 2017: Rainer Weiss, Kip S. Thorne, Barry C. Barish and the LIGO Scientific Collaboration
- 2018: Svante Pääbo
- 2019: Joanne Chory and Sandra Myrna Díaz
- 2020: Yves Meyer, Ingrid Daubechies, Terence Tao and Emmanuel Candès
- 2021: Katalin Karikó, Drew Weissman, Philip Felgner, Uğur Şahin, Özlem Türeci, Derrick Rossi and Sarah Gilbert
- 2022: Geoffrey Hinton, Yann LeCun, Yoshua Bengio and Demis Hassabis
- 2023: Jeffrey I. Gordon, E. Peter Greenberg and Bonnie L. Bassler
- 2024: Daniel J. Drucker, Jeffrey M. Friedman, Joel F. Habener, Jens Juul Holst and Svetlana Mojsov
- 2025: Mary-Claire King
- 2026: David Klenerman, Shankar Balasubramanian and Pascal Mayer

=== Prince or Princess of Asturias Award for Concord ===
First awarded in 1986 it is aimed at recognizing the work of defending and advancing human rights, as well as promoting and protecting peace, freedom, solidarity, world heritage and, in general, the progress of humanity.

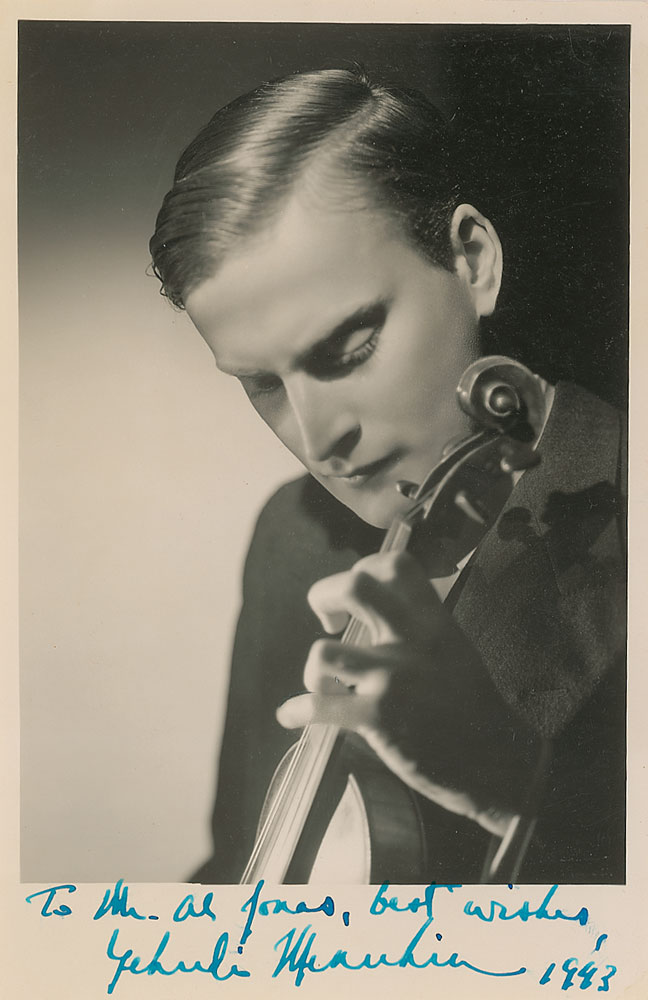
Yehudi Menuhin

- 1986: Vicariate of Solidarity
- 1987: Villa El Salvador
- 1988: International Union for Conservation of Nature and Natural Resources and World Wide Fund for Nature
- 1989: Stephen Hawking
- 1990: Sephardic Communities
- 1991: Médecins Sans Frontières and Medicus Mundi
- 1992: American Foundation for AIDS Research (AMFAR)
- 1993: Association for Peace in the Basque Country
- 1994: National Movement of Street Children, Messengers of Peace and Save the Children
- 1995: H.M. Hussein I, king of Jordan
- 1996: Adolfo Suárez
- 1997: Mstislav Rostropovich and Yehudi Menuhin
- 1998: Nicolás Castellanos, Vicente Ferrer, Joaquín Sanz Gadea and Muhammad Yunus
- 1999: Caritas Spain
- 2000: Royal Spanish Academy and Association of Academies of the Spanish Language
- 2001: World Network of Biosphere Reserves
- 2002: Daniel Barenboim and Edward Said
- 2003: J. K. Rowling
- 2004: The Way of St. James
- 2005: Daughters of Charity of Saint Vincent de Paul
- 2006: UNICEF
- 2007: Yad Vashem
- 2008: Íngrid Betancourt
- 2009: The City of Berlin
- 2010: Manos Unidas
- 2011: Fukushima 50
- 2012: Spanish Federation of Food Banks
- 2013: Spanish Organization for the Blind (ONCE)
- 2014: Caddy Adzuba
- 2015: Hospitaller Order of St John of God
- 2016: SOS Children's Villages
- 2017: European Union
- 2018: Sylvia A. Earle
- 2019: The City of Gdańsk
- 2020: Spanish health workers on the front line against COVID-19
- 2021: José Andrés and the World Central Kitchen
- 2022: Shigeru Ban
- 2023: Mary's Meals
- 2024: Magnum Photos
- 2025: National Museum of Anthropology of Mexico
- 2026: Christina Koch

=== Exemplary Town of Asturias ===
Every year, a town or community organization in the Principality of Asturias is chosen to receive this award, a royal visit, and a prize of €25,000.

- 1990: San Esteban de Cuñaba (Peñamellera Baja)
- 1991: Cubera, Asociación de Amigos del Paisaje de Villaviciosa
- 1992: Soto de Luiña and Novellana (Cudillero)
- 1993: Neighborhood Community of Grandas de Salime
- 1994: Shepherds in Picos de Europa (Amieva, Cabrales, Cangas de Onís, and Onís)
- 1995: Puerto de Vega (Navia)
- 1996: Neighborhood Community of Nava
- 1997: Castropol
- 1998: Xomezana and Valle del Huerna (Lena)
- 1999: Neighborhood and Educational Community of Ibias
- 2000: Tuña (Tineo)
- 2001: Paredes (Valdés)
- 2002: Hermandad de La Probe y Comunidad de La Foz de Morcín (Morcín)
- 2003: Navelgas (Tineo)
- 2004: Villar de Vildas (Somiedo)
- 2005: Porrúa (Llanes)
- 2006: Neighborhood Community of Sariego
- 2007: Sociedad Humanitarios de San Martín y Pueblo de Moreda (Aller)
- 2008: Torazo (Cabranes)
- 2009: Neighborhood Community of Sobrescobio
- 2010: Lastres (Colunga)
- 2011: San Tirso de Abres
- 2012: Bueño/Güeñu (Ribera de Arriba)
- 2013: Neighborhood Community of Teverga
- 2014: Associative and neighborhood movement of Boal
- 2015: Colombres (Ribadedeva)
- 2016: Neighborhood Community of Oscos (Santa Eulalia de Oscos, San Martín de Oscos, and Villanueva de Oscos)
- 2017: Poreño (Villaviciosa)
- 2018: Moal (Cangas del Narcea)
- 2019: Asiego (Cabrales)
- 2020: Somao (Pravia)
- 2021: Santa María del Puerto (Somiedo)
- 2022: Cadavéu (Valdés)
- 2023: Arroes, Pion, and Candanal (Villaviciosa)
- 2024: Sotres (Cabrales)
- 2025: Valdesoto (Siero)
- 2026: Cofradía de Pescadores Santa Ana (Llanes)

== See also ==
- List of general science and technology awards
- Graciano García García, co-founder of the Prince of Asturias Foundation
