= Asiegu =

Asiegu Asiegu
- Asiego
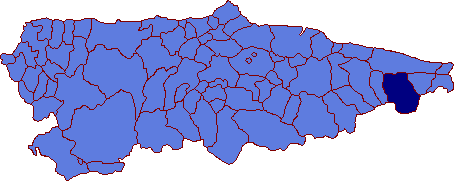

- Location in Spain
- Coordinates: 43°19.52106′N 4°51.79482′W
- Country: Spain
- Autonomous community: Asturias
- Province: Asturias
- Parish: Carreña
- Municipality: Cabrales
- Comarca: Oviedo
- Judicial district: Llanes
- Time zone: UTC+1 (CET)
  - Summer (DST): UTC+2 (CEST)
- Postal code: 33555

Asiegu is a hamlet (aldea) in the parish of Carreña, in the Asturian municipality (conceyu) of Cabrales.

It is located 3 km from Carreña, the capital of the municipality, and 425 m of altitude. In 2018 it had a population of 95 inhabitants.

On September 2, 2019, the jury of the Princess of Asturias Awards granted Asiegu the Exemplary People of Asturias Award.
