= Candanal =

Parish in Villaviciosa, Asturias, Spain

Coordinates: 43.466667°N 5.55°W

Candanal is one of 41 parishes (administrative divisions) in Villaviciosa, a municipality within the province and autonomous community of Asturias, in northern Spain.

The parroquia is 13.11 km^{2} (5.06 sq mi) in size, with a population of 242 (INE 2005).

On September 4, 2023, the jury of the Princess of Asturias Awards granted Candanal, along with Arroes and Pion, the Exemplary Town of Asturias Award.

== Villages and hamlets ==
- Argañosu
- Barromán
- Cabañes
- Capión
- Colláu
- Cortina
- El Carbayal
- El Cubilón
- El Felguerón
- El Gallinal
- El Llaniellu
- El Mayorazu
- El Molín del Medio
- El Préstamu
- El Requexu
- El Toral
- El Tuyu
- Grandiella
- L'Arrebalde
- La Braña
- La Casuca
- La Forca
- La Presa
- La Reguerina
- La Riega Llaneces
- La Rotella
- La Vega
- Les Portielles
- Los Salgueros
- Manzanéu
- Menchaca
- Pumardabá
- Referencies
- Roces
- Santecía
- Sitios
- Sobarrusu
- Solacueva
- Villarín

== See also ==
- Exemplary Town of Asturias Award
