= Pion, Asturias =

Coordinates: 43.48644602°N 5.54294999°E

Pion is one of 41 parishes (administrative divisions) in Villaviciosa, a municipality within the province and autonomous community of Asturias, in northern Spain.

Situated at 76 m (249 ft) above sea level, the parroquia is 13.11 km^{2} (5.06 sq mi) has a population of 392 (INE 2020).

On September 4, 2023, the jury of the Princess of Asturias Awards granted Pion, along with Arroes and Candanal, the Exemplary Town of Asturias Award.

== Villages and hamlets ==
- El Curviellu
- El Requexu
- El Valle
- La Riera
- Pion

Other places

- Arbezu
- Bellide
- Brañaverniz
- Buznéu
- Bárcena
- Carpintosa
- Casamoria
- Costales
- El Gomial
- El Prioratu
- El Préstamu
- El Riberu
- Fonfría
- Fuentescala
- L'Acebal
- La Cabañina
- La Cabañona
- La Casa'l Yanqui
- La Casona
- La Cuétara
- La Garita
- La Pedrera
- La Rasa
- La Rebollada
- La Torre
- La Venta
- Llantáu
- Los Picaretos
- Moñancu
- Peñesblanques
- Samartín

== See also ==
- Exemplary Town of Asturias Award
