= Linda R. Watkins =

American biochemist and physiologist (born 1954)

Linda Watkins
- Born: Linda R. Watkins; 1954 (age 71–72); Norfolk, Virginia, United States
- Scientific career
- Fields: Glial cells; Pain
- Institutions: University of Colorado Boulder

Linda R. Watkins (born 1954) is an American biochemist and physiologist. She discovered that glial cells can play a key role in the neuronal treatment of pain.

Since 1988 she has been a professor at the University of Colorado Boulder, in the Department of Psychology and Neuroscience.

In 2010, she was awarded the Prince of Asturias Awards for Technical and Scientific Research along David Julius and Baruch Minke.

== Education ==
Watkins received her B.S from UCLA in 1976 and her PhD in physiology from the Medical College of Virginia in 1980.
