= Cadavéu =

Cadavéu Cadavéu
- Cadavéu
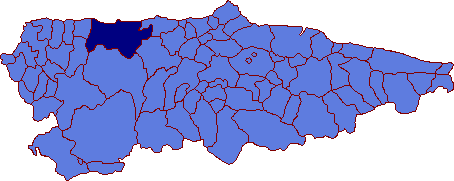

- Location in Spain
- Country: Spain
- Autonomous community: Asturias
- Province: Asturias
- Parish: Cadavéu
- Municipality: Valdés
- Comarca: Oviedo
- Judicial district: Valdés
- Time zone: UTC+1 (CET)
  - Summer (DST): UTC+2 (CEST)

Cadavéu is a parroquia (parish) in Valdés, a municipality within the province and autonomous community of Asturias, in northern Spain.

On September 5, 2022, the jury of the Princess of Asturias Awards granted Cadavéu the Exemplary Town of Asturias Award.

== See also ==
- Exemplary Town of Asturias Award
