= Baruch Minke =

Israeli biochemists and geneticists (born 1940)

- ברוך מינקה
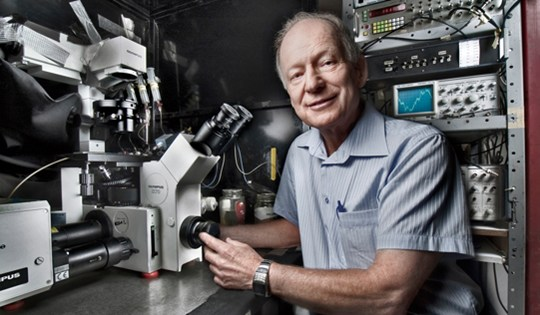
- Born: 1940; Tel Aviv, Israel
- Education: Hebrew University of Jerusalem
- Scientific career
- Fields: Ion channels; Pain
- Workplaces: Hebrew University of Jerusalem

Baruch Minke (Hebrew: ברוך מינקה; born 1940) is an Israeli biochemist and geneticist. He discovered TRP ion channels, involved in sensory sensations and pain.

Since 1987, he has been Professor of Physiology at the Hebrew University of Jerusalem.

In 2010, he was awarded the Prince of Asturias Awards for Technical and Scientific Research along David Julius and Linda R. Watkins.
