= Arroes =

Coordinates: 43.516667°N 5.516667°W

Arroes is one of 41 parishes (administrative divisions) in Villaviciosa, a municipality within the province and autonomous community of Asturias, in northern Spain.

Situated at 100 m (330 ft) above sea level, the parroquia has a population of 422.

On September 4, 2023, the jury of the Princess of Asturias Awards granted Arroes, along with Pion and Candanal, the Exemplary Town of Asturias Award.

== Villages and hamlets ==
- El Barru Riba
- El Fonduxu
- El Puente Arroes
- La Rionda
- Les Melendreres
- Ñava
- Samiguel de Llonxes

Other places

- Cayao
- Cimavilla
- El Barréu
- El Benitón
- El Campón
- El Pumarín
- El Tineo
- El Toyu
- L'Arbeyal
- L'Aspra
- La Carbayera
- La Cerra
- La Cespedera
- La Cámbara
- La Ferrería
- La Filera
- La Floría
- La Moyada
- La Quintana
- La Texera
- La Venta
- Los Llanos
- Los Payares
- Pedrime

== See also ==
- Exemplary Town of Asturias Award
