= Llastres =

- Parish
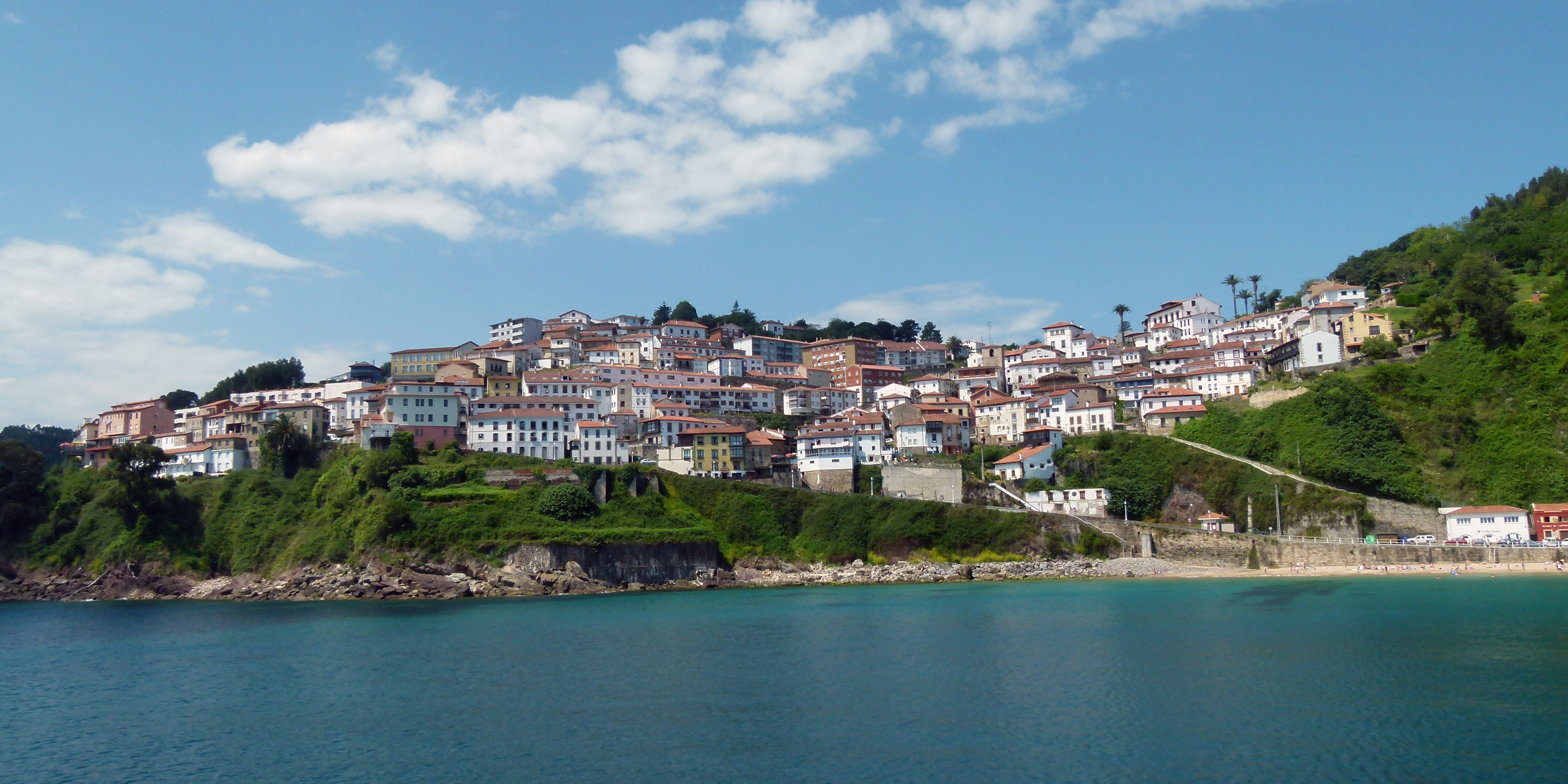
- Village of Llastres

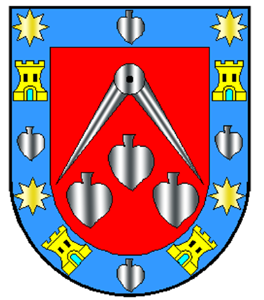
- Coat of arms

- Location within Spain
- Coordinates: 43°31′N 5°16′W
- Country: Spain
- Autonomous community: Asturias
- Province: Asturias
- Municipality: Colunga

Spanish Cultural Heritage
- Type: Non-movable
- Criteria: Historic ensemble
- Designated: 7 May 1992
- Reference no.: RI-53-0000441

Llastres (Spanish: Lastres) is one of 13 parishes (administrative divisions) in the Colunga municipality, within the province and autonomous community of Asturias, in northern Spain.

The population is 1,159 (INE 2004).

== Heritage ==
Santa María de Sabada Church

Declared as Bien de Interés Cultural, it was built in the 18th century. The tower was added at the end of the 19th century.

Capilla de San Roque

It is located in the heights of the village. It also has a balcony for watching a panoramical view of the village and its port.

== Recent history ==
Between 2009 and 2011 Doctor Mateo, a comedy drama produced for Antena 3 was filmed in the town. In the drama Llastres was called San Martín del Sella.

In 2010, Llastres received a Prince of Asturias Award, as the exemplary Asturian town of the year.

== Gallery ==
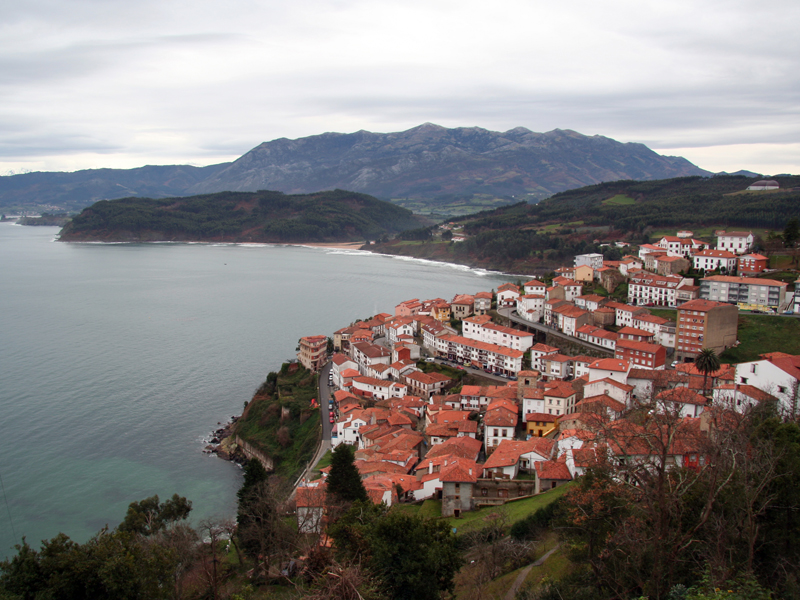
Llastres

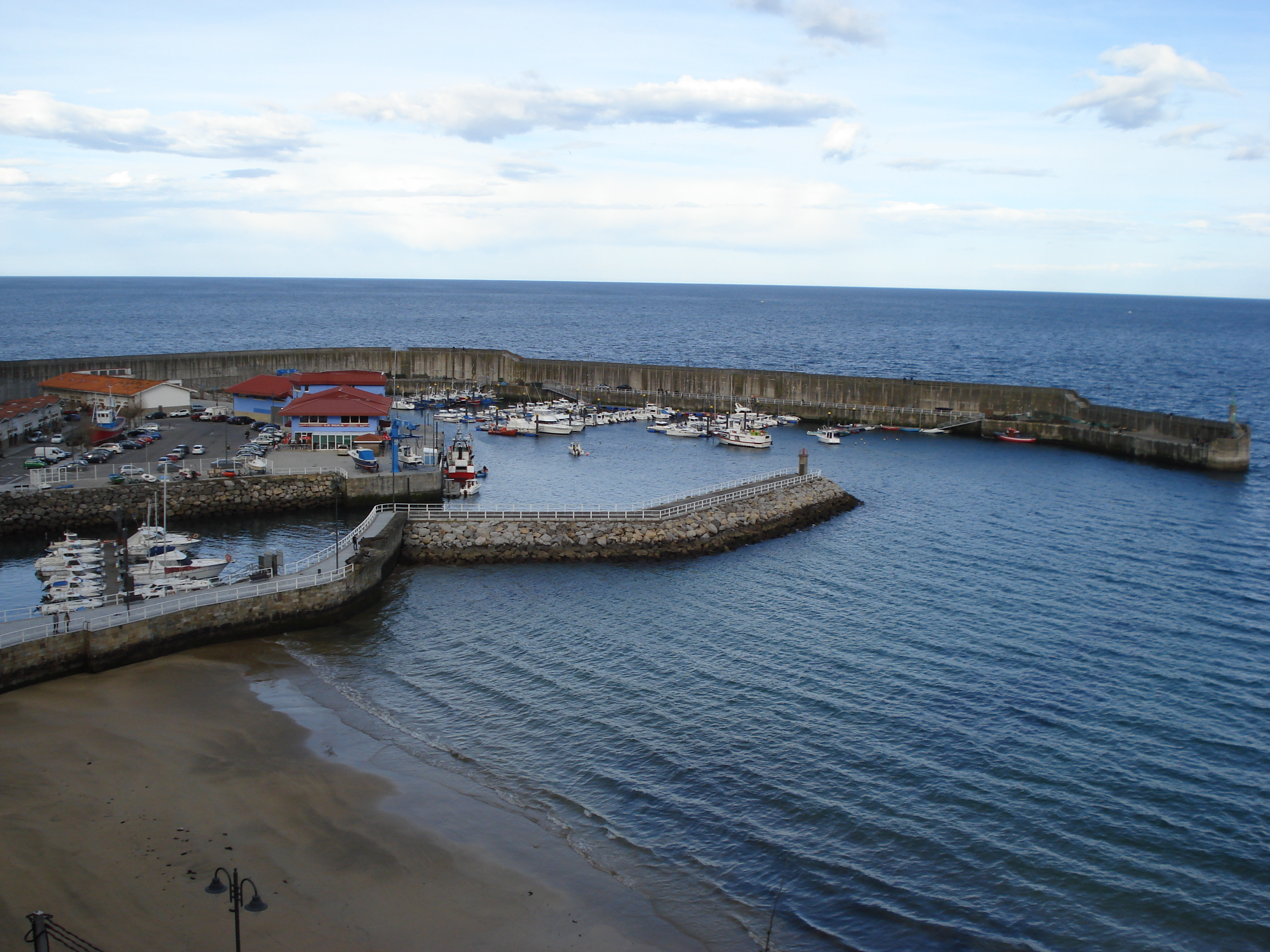
Port of Llastres

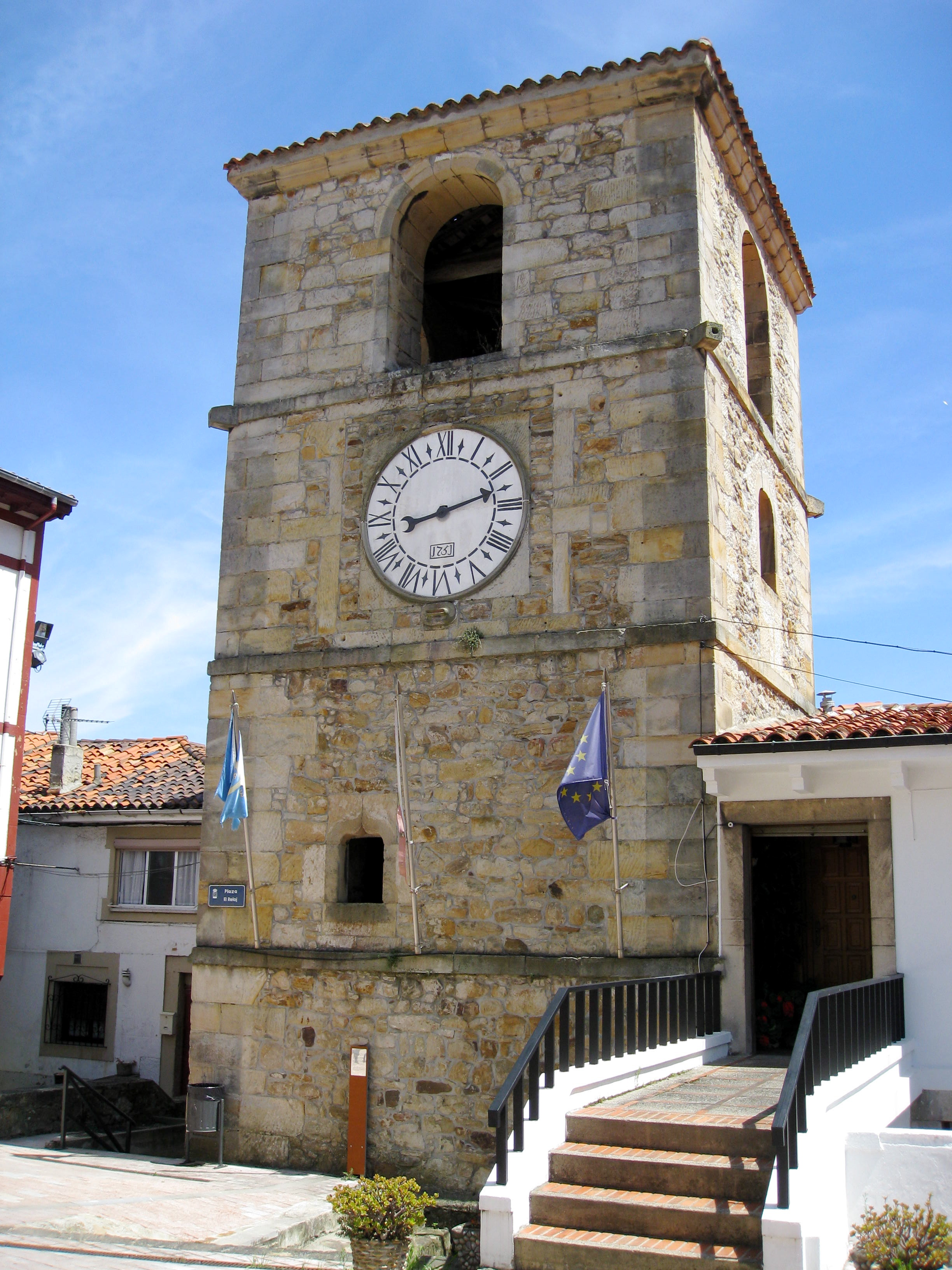
Torre del Reloj

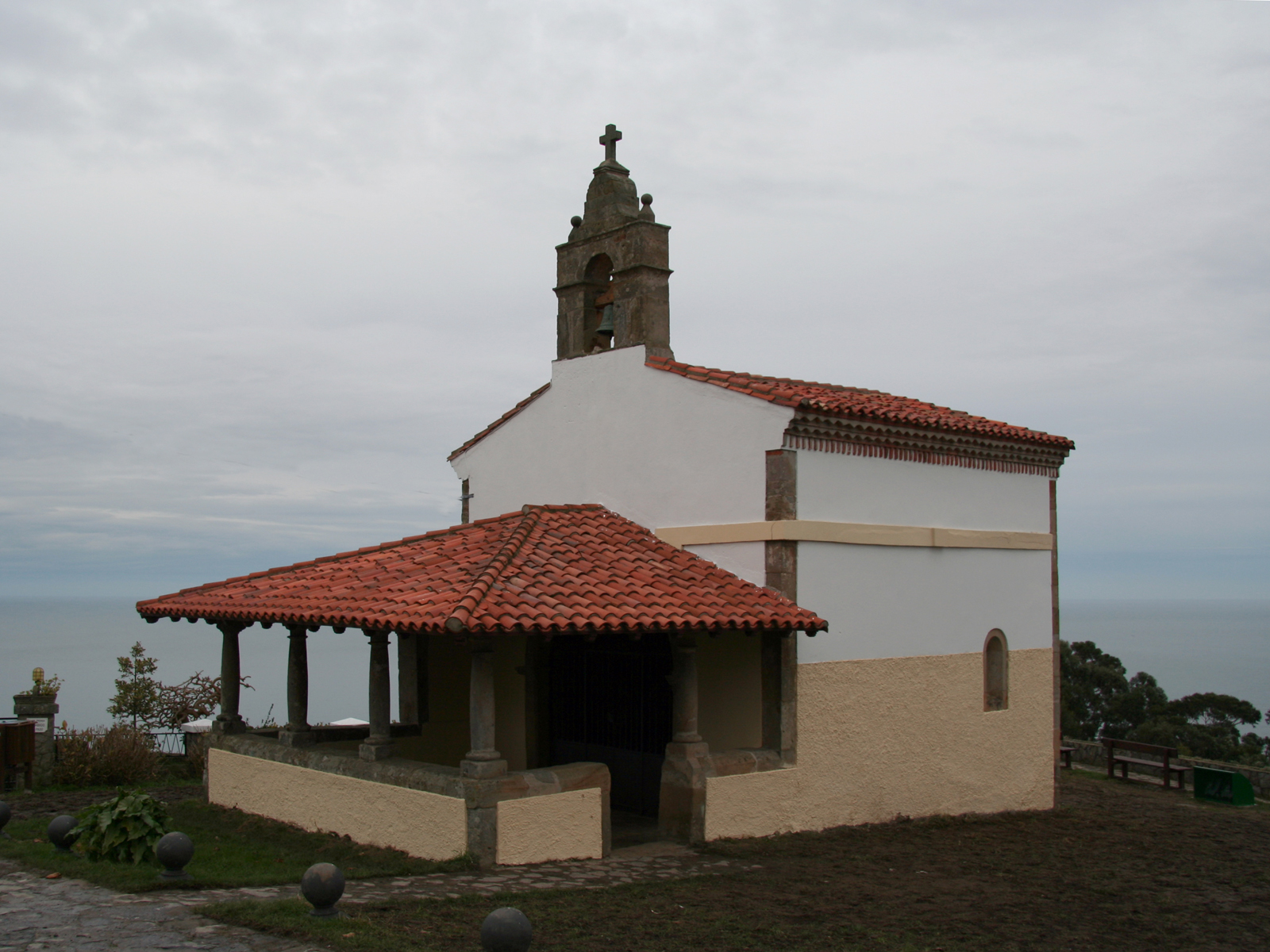
Ermita de San Roque

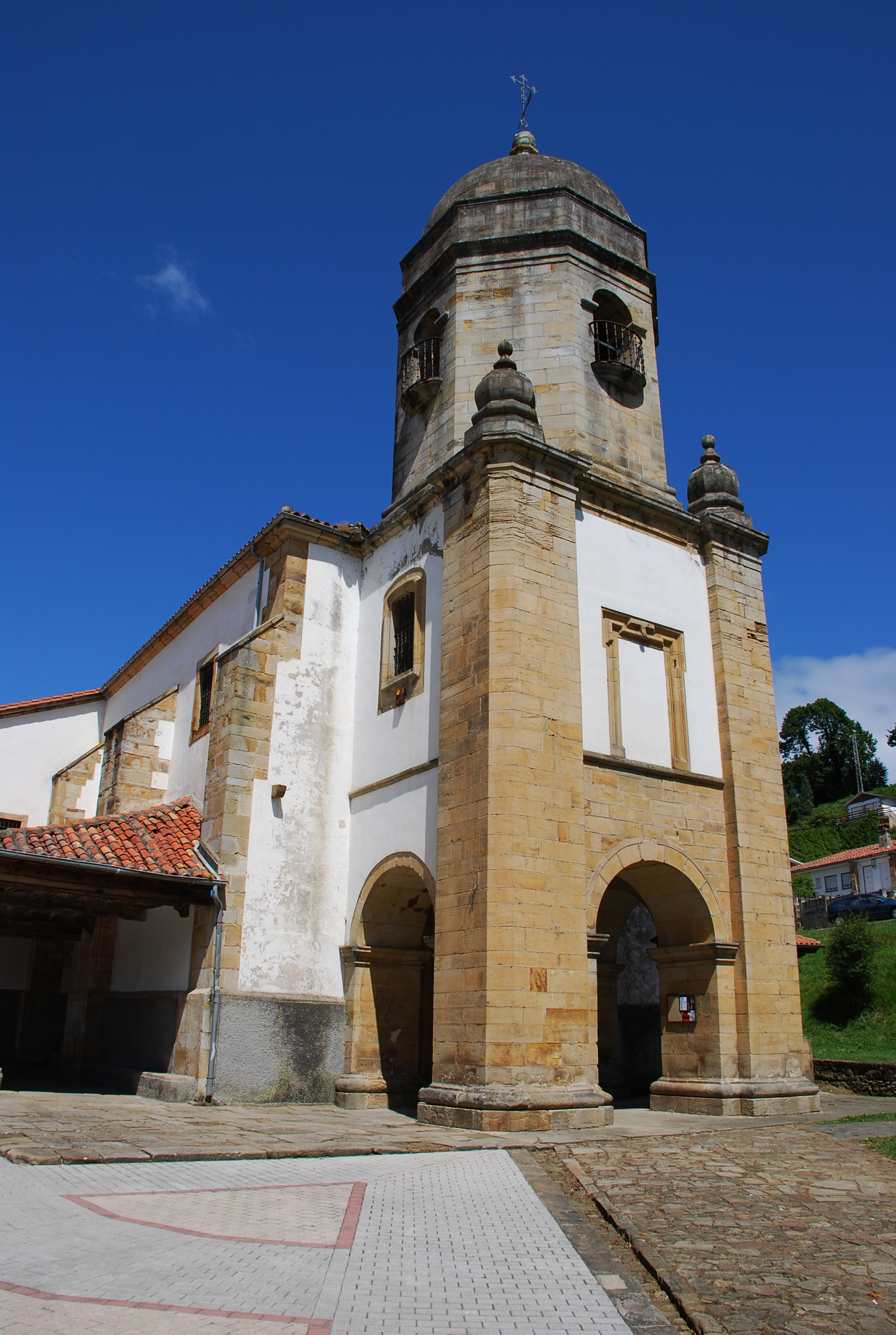
Santa María de Sabada church

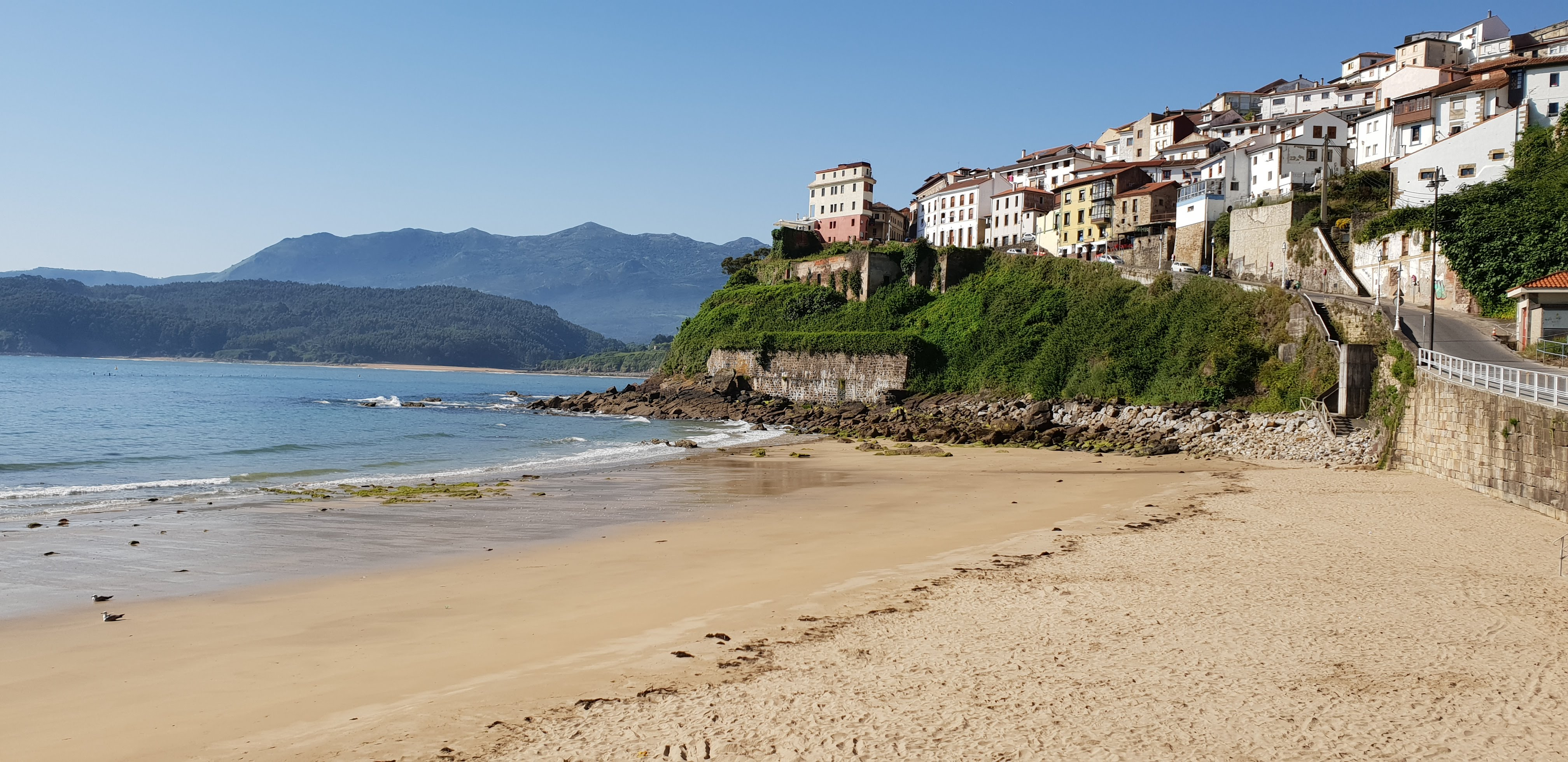
A view of the town down from the beach
