= Villar de Vildas =

Civil Parish in Somiedo, Spain

Coordinates: 43.1°N 6.333333°W

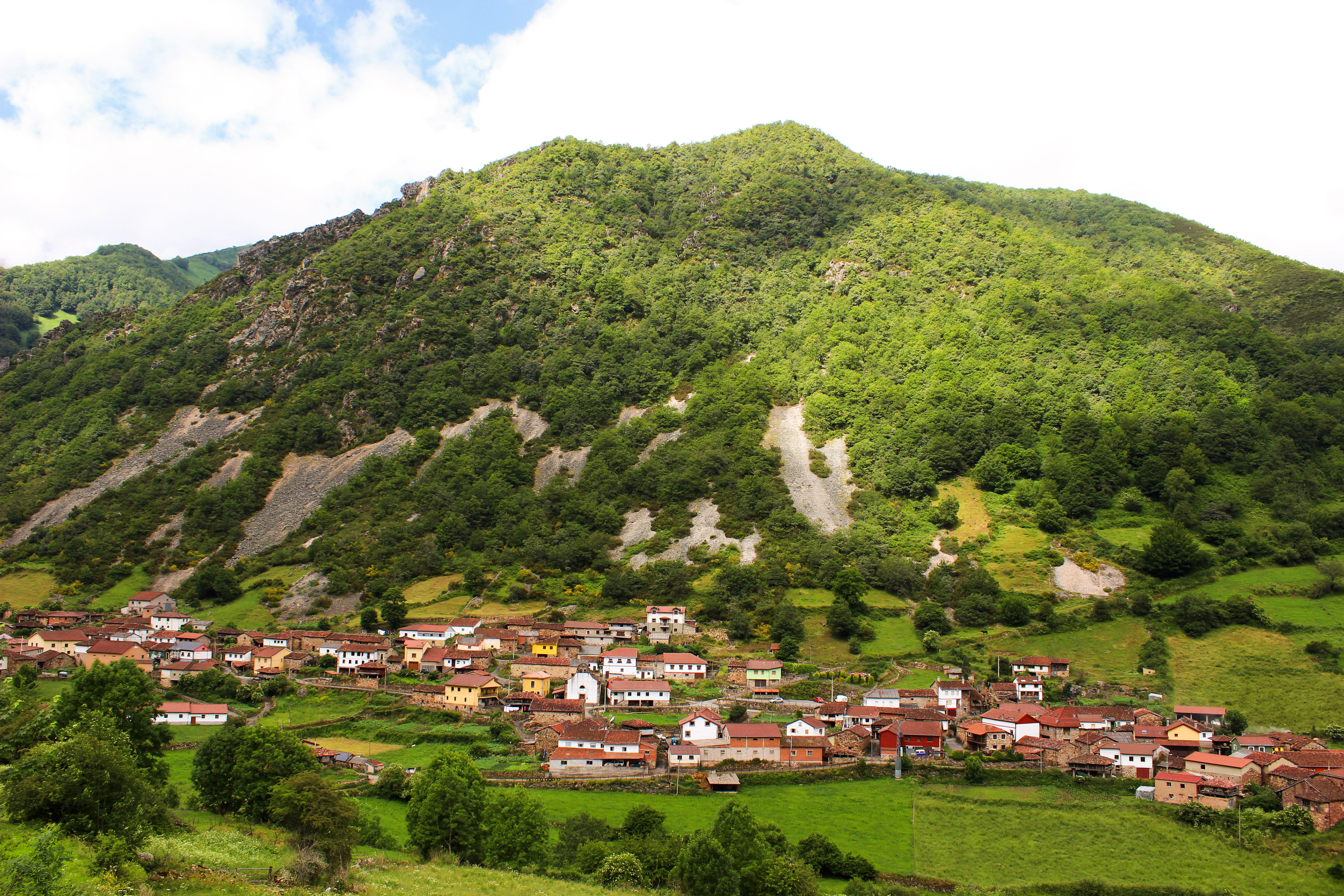
Villa de Vildas

Villar de Vildas is one of fifteen parishes (administrative divisions) in Somiedo, a municipality within the province and autonomous community of Asturias, in northern Spain.

It is 35.54 km^{2} (13.72 sq mi) in size, with a population of 110 (INE 2006). The postal code is 33842.
