= Novellana =

- Parish
- Location within Spain
- Country: Spain
- Autonomous community: Asturias
- Province: Asturias
- Municipality: Cudillero

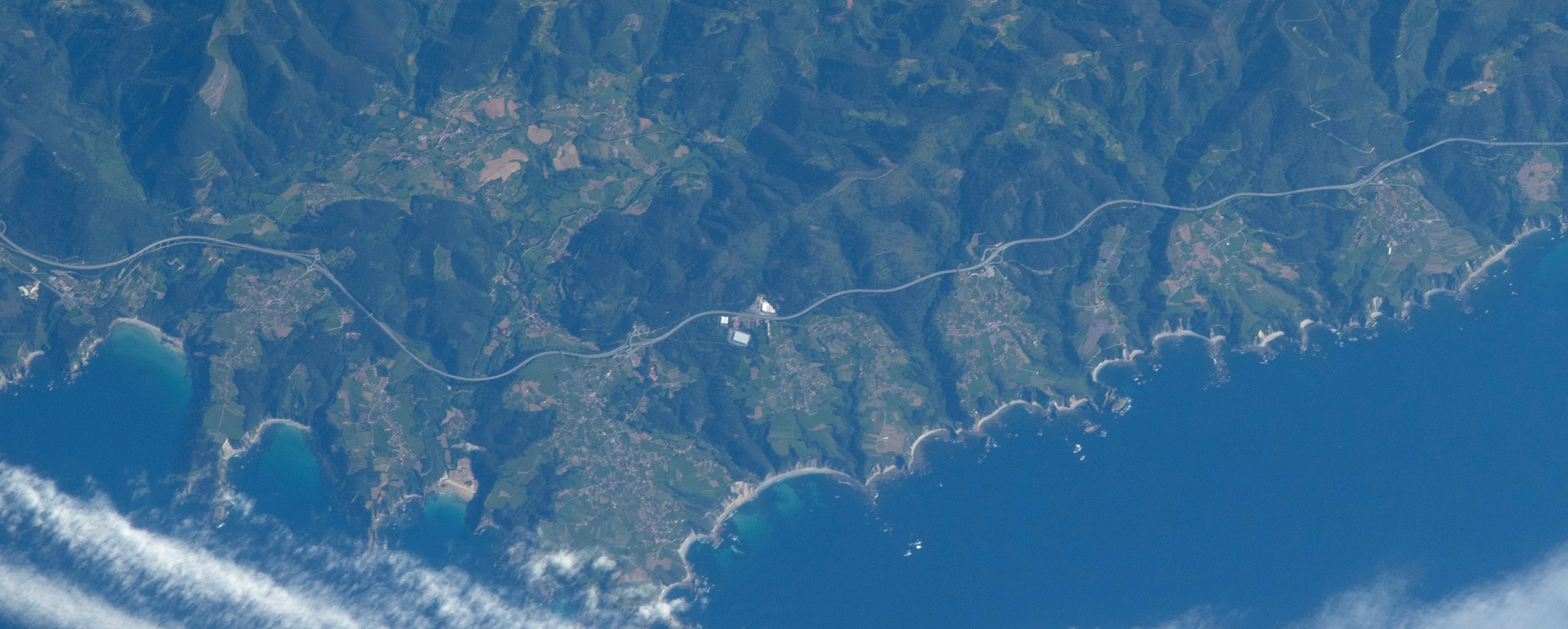
coast of Cudillero, villages

Novellana is one of nine parishes (administrative divisions) in the Cudillero municipality, within the province and autonomous community of Asturias, in northern Spain.

The population was 317 in 2007.

== Villages ==
- Castañeras
- Nuviana
