= Colombres (Ribadedeva) =

Coordinates: 43°22′30″N 4°32′31″W

Colombres is one of three parishes (administrative divisions) in Ribadedeva, a municipality within the province and autonomous community of Asturias, in northern Spain.

Colombres is bordered to the north by the Cantabrian Sea; west of Cantabria, and the Deva River; on the south by the parish of San Juan and west by the parish of Noriega.

In 2011 the population was 1,385. In 2015 it won Premio Princesa de Asturias for "Pueblo ejemplar".

One of the most famous people in Colombres was Iñigo Noriega, who was born on 21 May 1853, he emigrated to Mexico with his uncle and he built a palace in his village named La Quinta de Guadalupe, which is the setting for Fundación de Archivos de Indianos, a place for documents about people who emigrated to South and North America since the 19th century.

== Villages ==
- Bustio ("Bustiu")
- Colombres (capital of the municipality)
- El Peral
- Pimiango ("Pimiangu")
