= Soto de Luiña =

- Parish
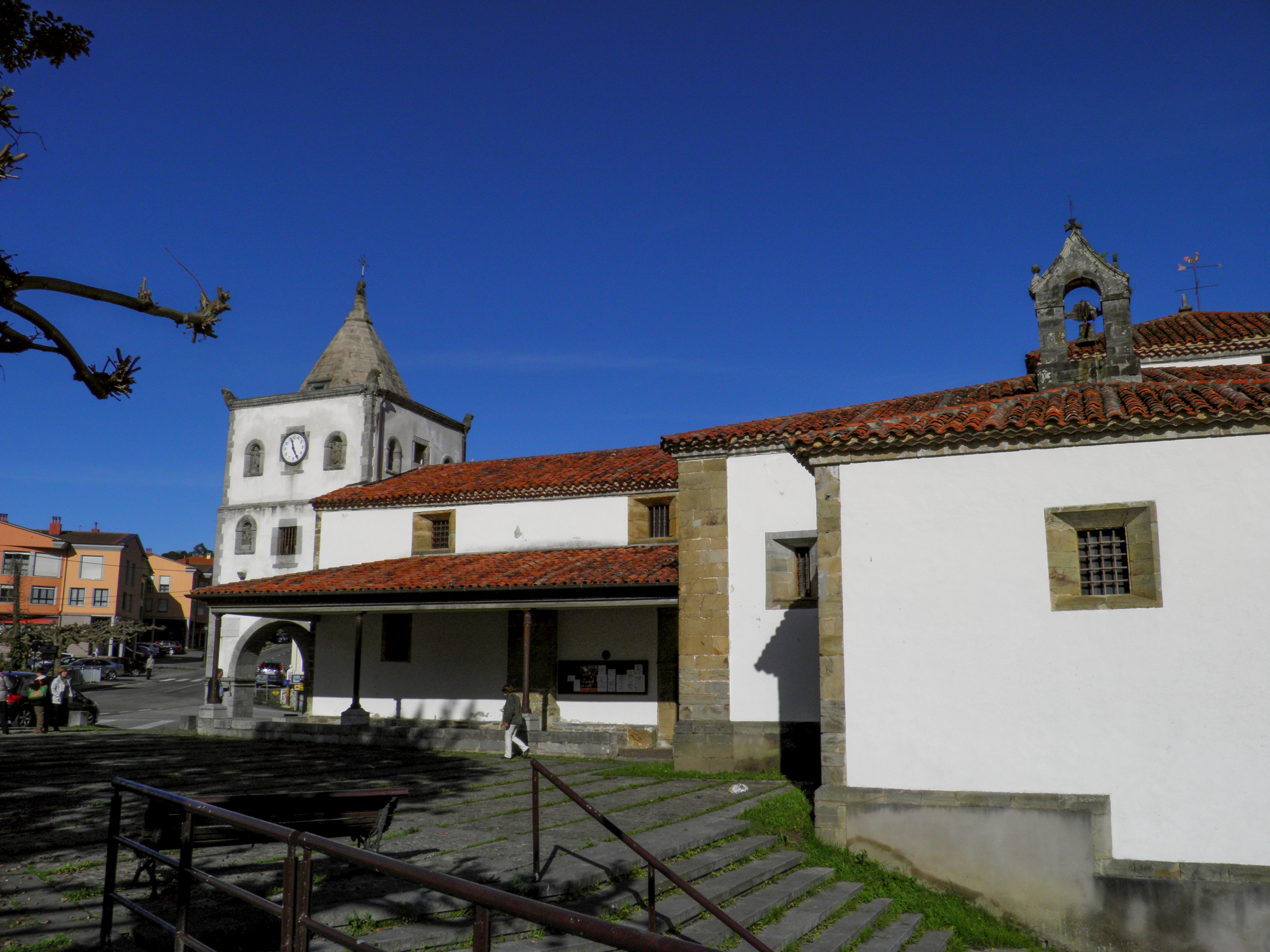

- Location within Spain
- Coordinates: 43.566667°N 6.233333°W
- Country: Spain
- Autonomous community: Asturias
- Province: Asturias
- Municipality: Cudillero

Soto de Luiña is one of nine parishes (administrative divisions) in the Cudillero municipality, within the province and autonomous community of Asturias, in northern Spain.

The population is 505 (INE 2007).

== Villages ==
- Albuerne
- Llanurrozu
- Pandiellu
- Prámaru
- San Pedru la Ribera
- Troncéu
- Valdréu
