= Minho =

Minho or Miño may refer to:

== People ==
- Miño (surname)
- Choi Min-ho, South Korean singer and actor known mononymously as Minho

== Places ==
- Minho (river) or Miño, in Portugal and Spain

=== Jamaica ===
- Rio Minho, a river

=== Portugal ===
- Minho Province, a historical province (1936-1976)
- Minho VR, a wine region

=== Spain ===
- Miño, a municipality in the province of A Coruña, Galicia
- Miño de Medinaceli, a municipality in the province of Soria, Castile and León
- Miño (Tineo), a parish (administrative division) in Tineo, a municipality within the province and autonomous community of Asturias

== Other uses ==
- Miño Volcano, El Loa Province, Antofagasta Region, Chile
- Minho, one of the main characters from The Maze Runner series; a runner

== See also ==
- Min-ho, Korean given name
- Mino (disambiguation)
