= Mino =

Mino may refer to:

== Places in Japan ==
- Mino, Gifu, a city in Gifu Prefecture
- Mino, Kagawa, a former town in Kagawa Prefecture
- Mino, Tokushima, a town in Tokushima Prefecture
- Mino, an alternate spelling of Minoh, a city in Osaka Prefecture
- Mino District, Hyōgo, a former district in Hyōgo Prefecture
- Mino District, Shimane, a former district in Shimane Prefecture
- Mino Province, an old province in the southern part of Gifu Prefecture

== Arts and entertainment ==
- Mino (miniseries), a 1986 Italian-West German miniseries
- Mino, the pieces of a Tetrimino in Tetris
- Mino, a video game by Xio Interactive involved in the lawsuit Tetris Holding, LLC v. Xio Interactive, Inc.

== People ==
- Mino (given name), a list of people with the given name or nickname
- Mino (footballer), Spanish former footballer Bernardino Serrano Mori (born 1963)
- Mino (rapper), stage name of South Korean rapper Song Min-ho (born 1993)
- Monta Mino, Japanese television presenter (born 1944)
- Mino Nenki, fictional character in the novel The Kouga Ninja Scrolls

== Other uses ==
- Mino dialect, a Japanese dialect spoken in southern Gifu Prefecture
- Mino Station, a railway station in Mitoyo, Kagawa Prefecture, Japan
- Minō Toll Road, Minoh, Osaka Prefecture, Japan
- Mino (straw cape), a type of traditional Japanese raincoat
- Mino (bird), a genus of myna starlings
- Dahomey Amazons, or Mino, a military unit of female warriors in the kingdom of Dahomey
- Flip Video Mino, a small camcorder

== See also ==
- Minho (disambiguation), including Miño
