= Asturias Gold Museum =

- Museo del Oro de Asturias
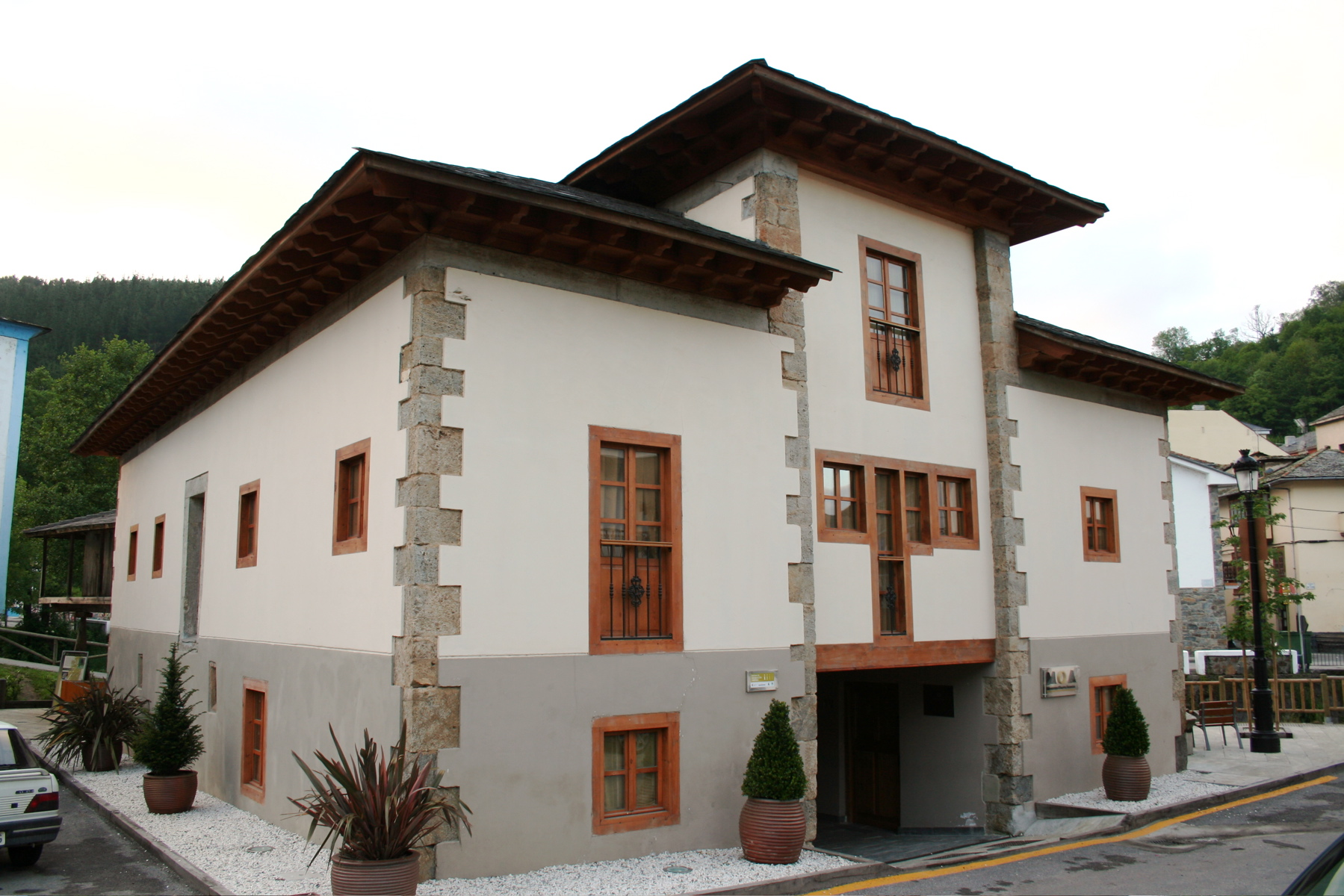
- Museum building

- Navelgas
- Established: June 2006
- Location: Navelgas, Tineo, Asturias, Spain
- Coordinates: 43.40°N 6.54°W
- Type: Mining museum
- Website: www.museodeloro.es

The Asturias Gold Museum a museum dedicated to the mining and uses of gold, located in the town of Navelgas in the municipality ("concejo") of Tineo, Asturias, Spain.

The museum is located on La Casona Capalleja in Navelgas, a town where gold has been mined since Roman times.

== Exhibits ==
A visit to the museum begins with an explanation of the mineral itself, including its uses, physical properties, and its natural state. One then sees production methods and world zones of mineral extraction.

Visitors explore an important part of human civilization, i.e. the use by the various civilizations of gold as a valuable asset, symbol, and decoration.

Next, visitors review the importance of gold in the history of mankind. The historical chronology ranges from the Neolithic Age to the present. One exhibit showcases the various gold rushes that occurred in California.

Finally, an area is devoted to gold in Navelgas. In this area, visitors can see the importance of gold, the importance the industry has had for the local community, and the various methods of gold extraction that have been used in the area since Roman times.

Gold panning deserves special attention, because even today it is practiced as a sport with several different championships. A section of the museum is devoted to the Roman system of mineral extraction. Following a multimedia presentation, visitors leave the field and head toward the central hall of the museum, where the explanation of Roman mining systems is amplified through replicas of their tools used for the extraction of gold. This portion of the museum shows the process of separating gold, accessories, and trophies.
