= Church of the Monastery of San Miguel de Bárcena =

Church in Barzana, Spain

Coordinates: 43.365295°N 6.518143°W

Church of the Monastery of San Miguel de Bárcena Iglesia del Monasterio de San Miguel(in Spanish)
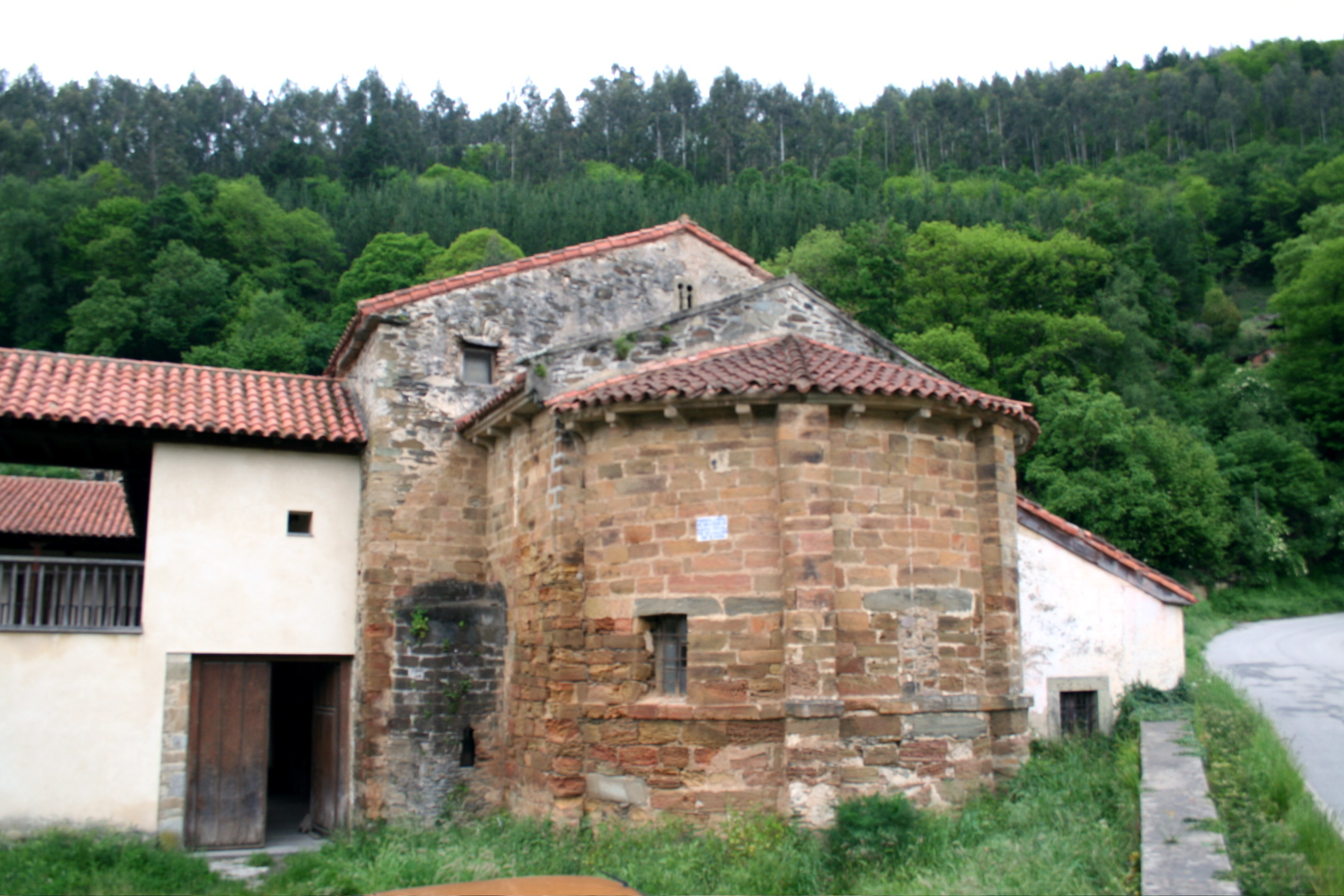
- Exterior view.

Religion
- Affiliation: Roman Catholic
- Diocese: Tineo
- Province: Asturias
- Ecclesiastical or organizational status: Church
- Year consecrated: 13th century

Location
- Location: Bárcena del Monasterio, Spain
- Interactive map of Church of the Monastery of San Miguel de Bárcena; Iglesia del Monasterio de San Miguel(in Spanish)

Architecture
- Type: Church

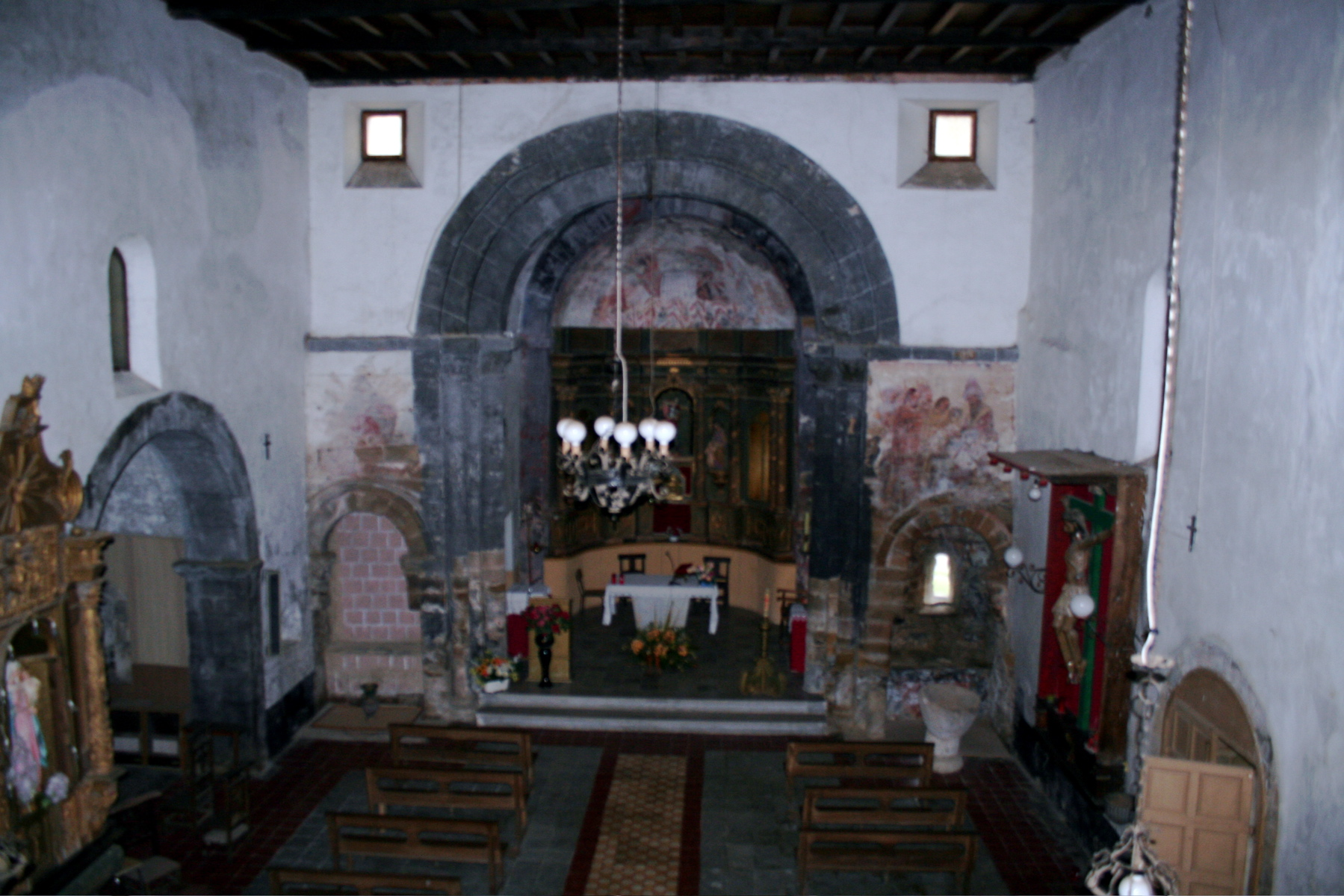
Interior view

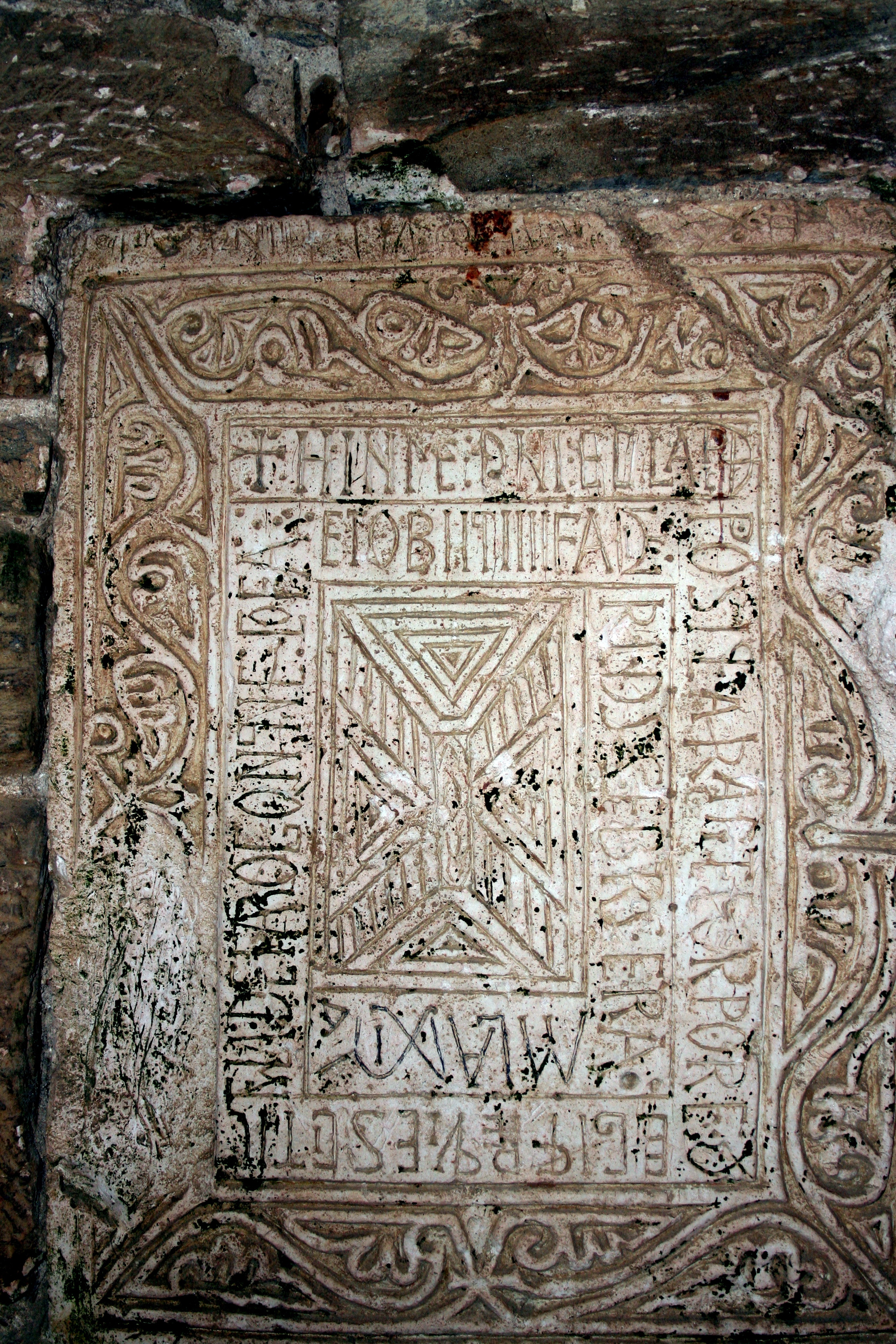
Funerary inscription: "In the name of the Lord. This stone is placed at the head of the body and it reads: Here rests the servant of God Arogontine confessed, and died on Wednesday, September 1 for the year 1003.

The Church of the Monastery of San Miguel de Bárcena (Spanish: Iglesia del Monasterio de San Miguel) is a church located in Bárcena del Monasterio, Tineo, Asturias, Spain.

The current building, formerly the church of the Monastery of San Miguel de Bárcena, dates from the 13th century. A 16th-century chapel is located on the building's north side. There is a vestry and small domed apsidioles. Part of the building contains Romanesque architecture, and another Pre-Romanesque. Its foundation is a reconstruction of an existing old building. The interior is decorated with wall paintings from the 16th century.

A stone funerary inscription dates to the year 1003.

== See also ==
- Asturian art
- Catholic Church in Spain
