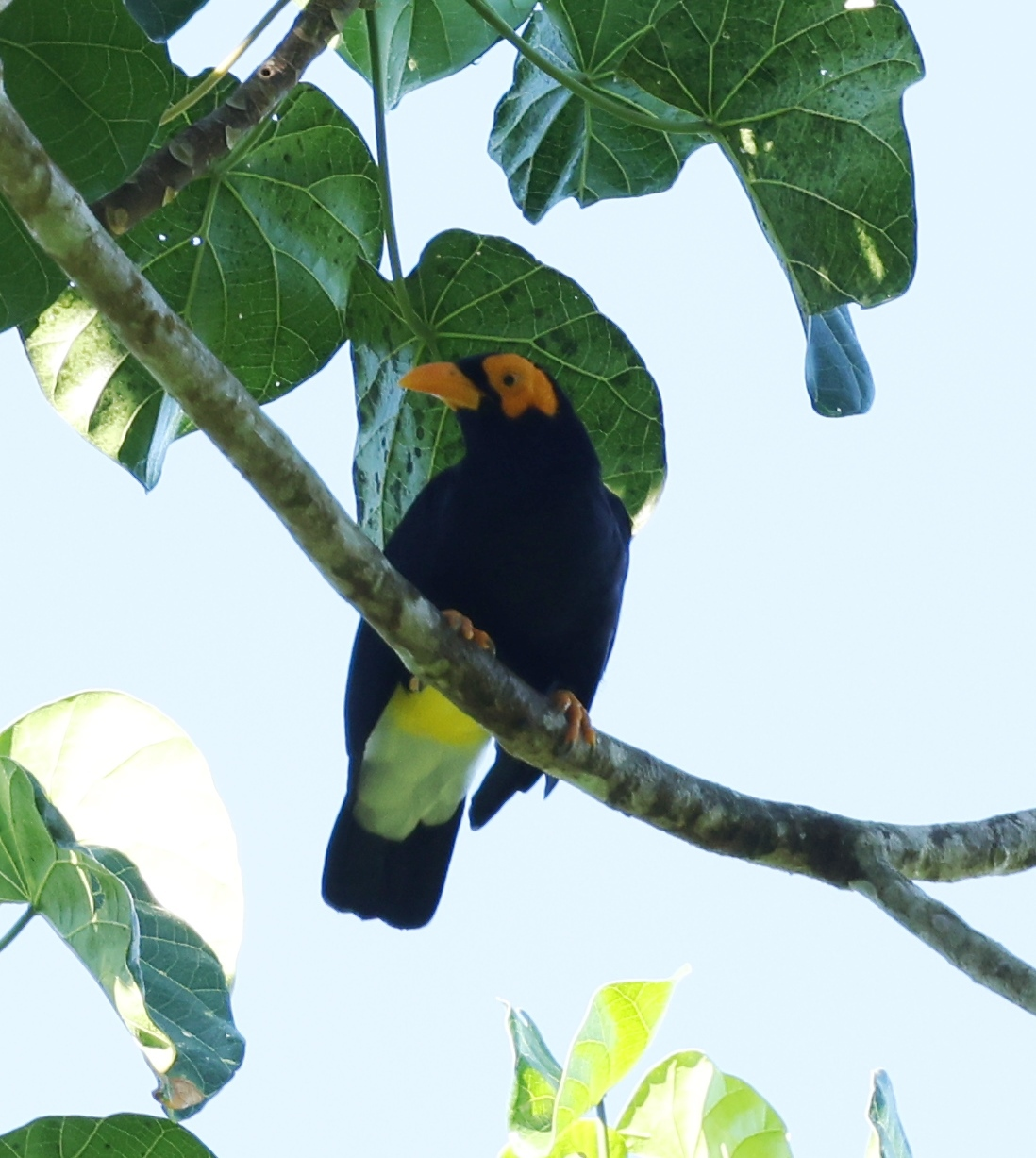

Conservation status
- Least Concern (IUCN 3.1)

Scientific classification
- Kingdom: Animalia
- Phylum: Chordata
- Class: Aves
- Order: Passeriformes
- Family: Sturnidae
- Genus: Mino
- Species: M. kreffti

Binomial name
- Mino kreffti (Sclater, PL, 1869)

= Long-tailed myna =

Species of bird

The long-tailed myna (Mino kreffti) is a member of the starling family. It is native to the Bismarck and Solomon archipelagos. It resembles the yellow-faced myna, and the two were formerly considered conspecific.

Its binomial name commemorates Gerard Krefft, Australian zoologist and palaeontologist.

== Description ==
Going on standard measurements and length, this very large myna is one of the largest member of the diverse family Sturnidae, behind only perhaps the Nias hill myna. It measures 29–32 cm (11–13 in) in length. Among standard measurements, the wing chord is 15.4 to 16.8 cm (6.1 to 6.6 in), the tail is 11.2 to 12.1 cm (4.4 to 4.8 in), the culmen is 2.9 to 3.3 cm (1.1 to 1.3 in) and the tarsus is 3.8 to 4.3 cm (1.5 to 1.7 in). No known weights have been reported. These measurements are just slightly larger on average than the closely related yellow-faced myna and indicate the species is around three times as massive as the common starling. The long-tailed myna mainly has purple-glossed black plumage. It has bright orange-yellow patches of naked skin around each eye. It has a yellow lower belly and white wing patches, which are obvious in flight. The rump and undertail are white and the strong bill is bright yellow.

== Behaviour ==
The long-tailed myna nests in tree holes, often in palms. The eggs are pale blue with delicate reddish or grey markings.

This myna is arboreal, and is found alone or in pairs in open lowland forests and plantations. It feeds mainly on fruits and berries. It is a conspicuous and vocal species with a wide range of whistles and squawks.
