= Arganza (Tinéu) =

Coordinates: 43.26667°N 6.50000°W

- Civil parish
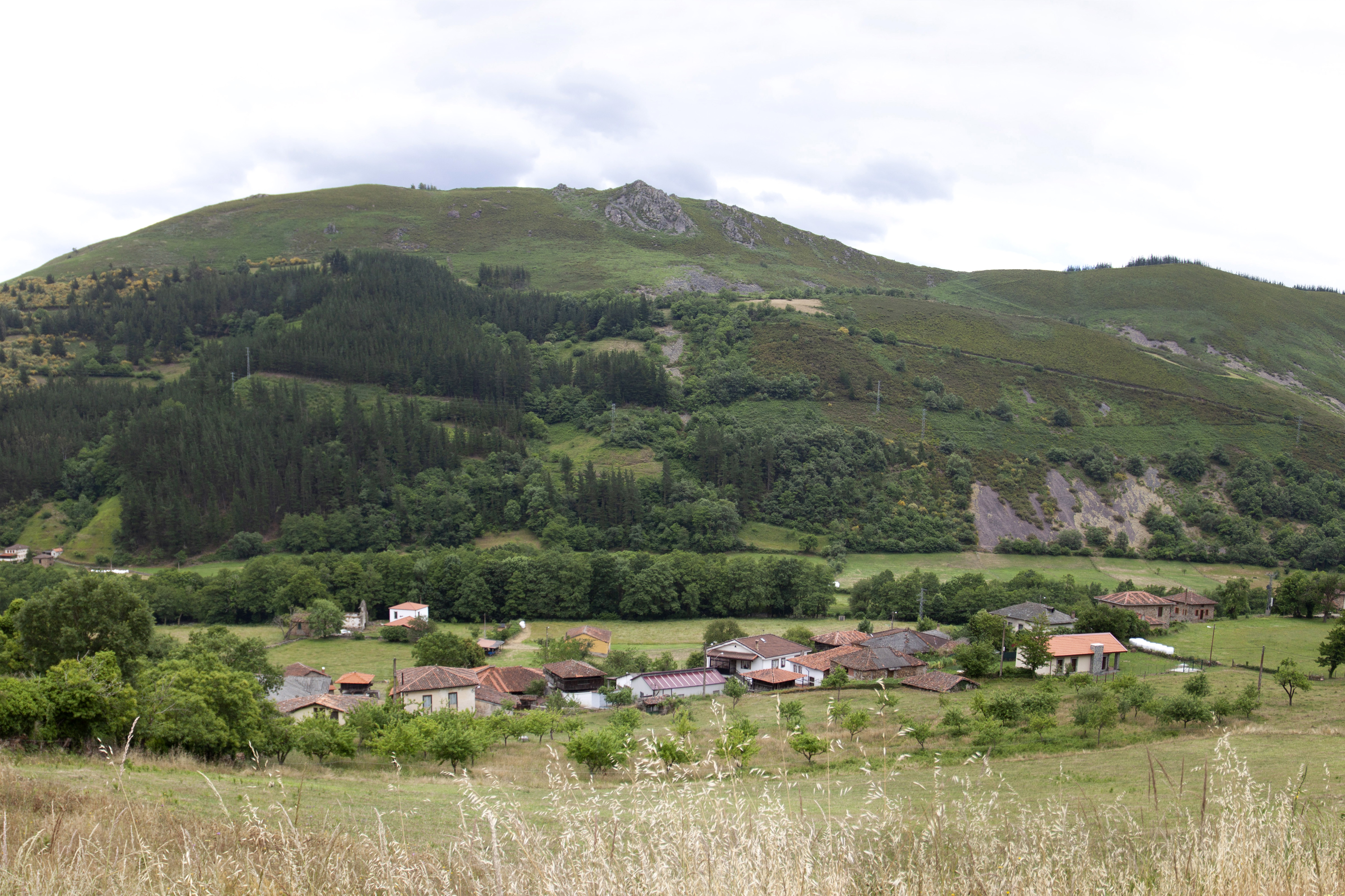
- Interactive map of Arganza
- Country: Spain
- Autonomous community: Asturias
- Province: Asturias
- Municipality: Tinéu

Arganza is a town and one of 44 civil parishes in Tinéu, a municipality within the province and autonomous community of Asturias in northern Spain. Located between the As-217 and the As-15, its elevation is 1,509 ft (460 m) above sea level.

The Church of Santa Maria of Arganza, built in 1992, sank and collapsed on 2 September 2007.

== Villages and hamlets ==
- Augüera
- Arganza
- Carriles
- La Ḷḷama
- Moure
- Rozadieḷḷa
- Sumión de Baxu
- Sumión d'Arriba
- Viḷḷarmóu
