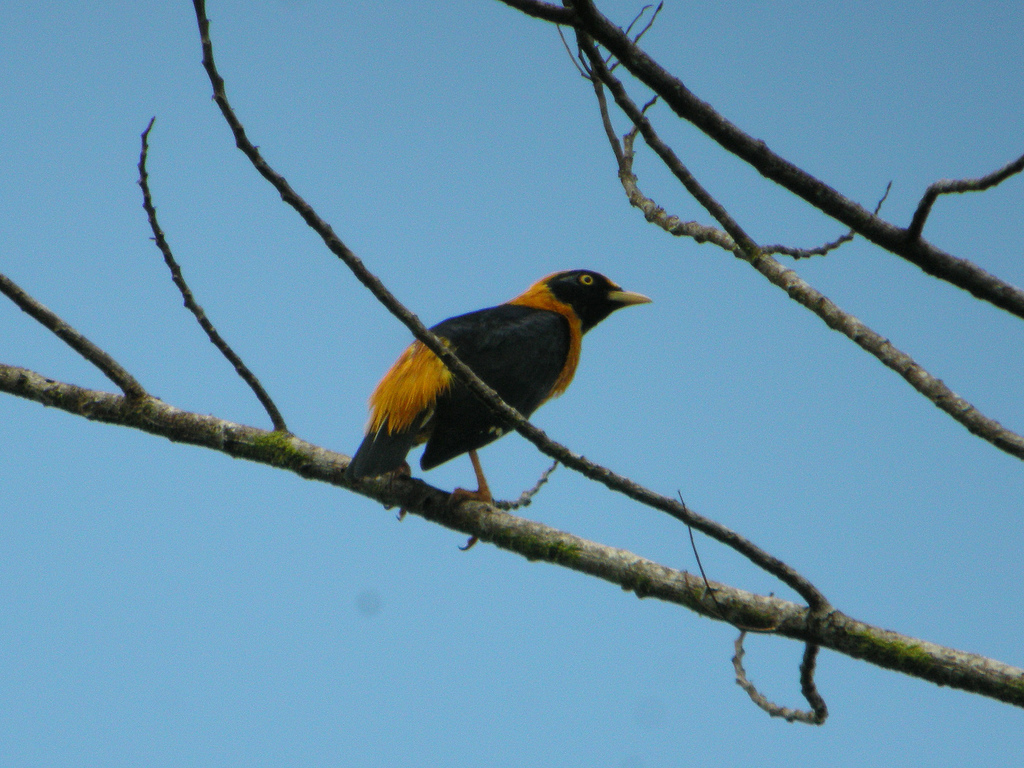

Conservation status
- Least Concern (IUCN 3.1)

Scientific classification
- Kingdom: Animalia
- Phylum: Chordata
- Class: Aves
- Order: Passeriformes
- Family: Sturnidae
- Genus: Mino
- Species: M. anais

Binomial name
- Mino anais (Lesson, 1839)

Synonyms
- Sericulus Anaïs (protonym)

= Golden myna =

Species of bird

The golden myna (Mino anais) is a species of starling in the family Sturnidae. It is found in New Guinea. Its natural habitat is subtropical or tropical moist lowland forest. René Primevère Lesson named this bird after his daughter Anaïs who died when she was eleven years old.
