= Sangoñéu =

Coordinates: 43.3°N 6.55°W

Sangoñéu (Spanish: Sangoñedo) is one of 44 parishes (administrative divisions) in Tinéu, a municipality within the province and autonomous community of Asturias, in northern Spain.

== Villages and hamlets ==
- Colinas de Baxu
- L'Espín
- Horria
- Preda
- Sangoñéu
