= Bárzana (Tinéu) =

- Civil parish
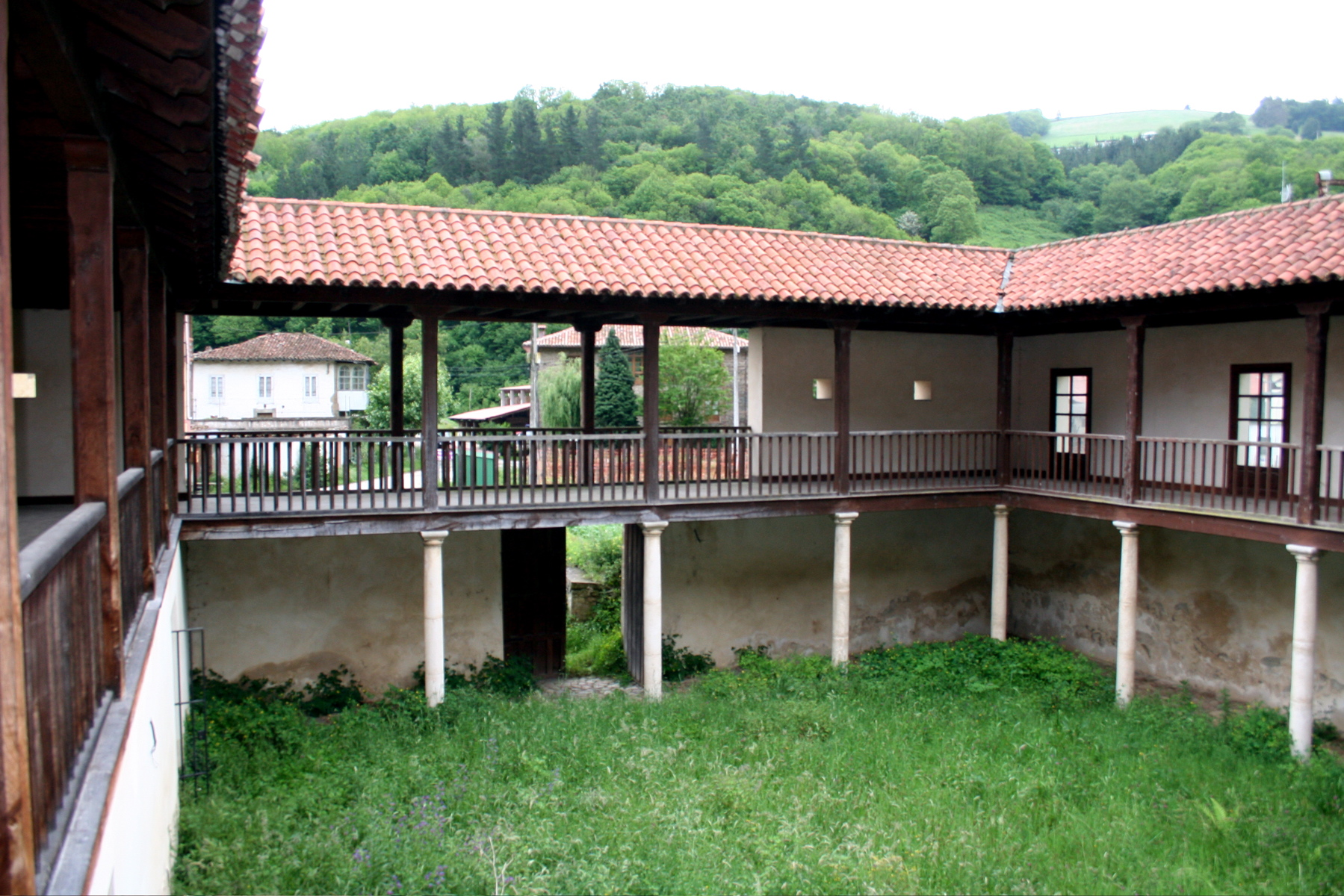
- View of the town, including the monastery cloister.

- Location within Spain
- Coordinates: 43°22′00.12″N 06°31′00.12″W
- Country: Spain
- Autonomous community: Asturias
- Province: Asturias
- Municipality: Tinéu
- Elevation: 468 m (1,535 ft)

Bárzana (Spanish: Bárcena del Monasterio; translation: "flat place near a river, which flooded, in whole or in part, with some frequency") is a town and one of 44 civil parishes in Tinéu, a municipality within the province and autonomous community of Asturias in northern Spain.

Located along the As-219, its elevation is 1,535 ft (468 m) above sea level.

== Tourism ==
A notable attraction is the Church of Monasterio de San Miguel ("Iglesia del Monasterio de San Miguel"), the town's 13th century monastery and attached church.
