= Sobráu =

Coordinates: 43.316667°N 6.533333°W

Sobráu is one of 44 parishes (administrative divisions) in Tinéu, a municipality within the province and autonomous community of Asturias, in northern Spain.

It is 7.67 km^{2} (2.96 sq mi) in size, with a population of 240 (INE 2004).

== Villages and hamlets ==
- Arroyu
- Campu
- Pena
- Sobráu
- Teixeiru
- Valentín
- Valmouriscu
- Viḷḷafronte
- Viḷḷamiana
- Vivente
