= San Fagondu =

Parish of Asturias, Spain

Coordinates: 43.2833°N 6.5167°W

San Fagondu (Spanish: San Facundo) is one of 44 parishes (administrative divisions) in Tinéu, a municipality within the province and autonomous community of Asturias, in northern Spain.

Situated at 523 m (1,716 ft) above sea level, it is 12.81 km^{2} (4.95 sq mi) in size, with a population of 210 (INE 2004). The postal code is 33875.

== Villages and hamlets ==
- Bárzana
- Barzanicas
- Cerviáu
- La Cueta
- Mirayu d'Arriba
- Pondusén
- San Fagondu
- Viḷḷacín
