= Viḷḷatresmil =

- Parrish
- Location within Spain
- Coordinates: 43.383333°N 6.433333°W
- Country: Spain
- Autonomous Community: Asturias
- Municipality: Tinéu

Viḷḷatresmil (Spanish: Villatresmil) is one of 44 parishes (administrative divisions) in Tinéu, a municipality within the province and autonomous community of Asturias, in northern Spain.

Situated at 500 m (1,600 ft) above sea level, it has a population of 319 (INE 2004).

== Villages ==
- Busteḷḷán
- Busturniegu
- Las Cruces
- Folgueirúa
- Las Tabiernas
- Viḷḷatresmil
