= Church of San Pedro, Ese de Calleras =

Iglesia de San Pedro (Ese de Calleras)
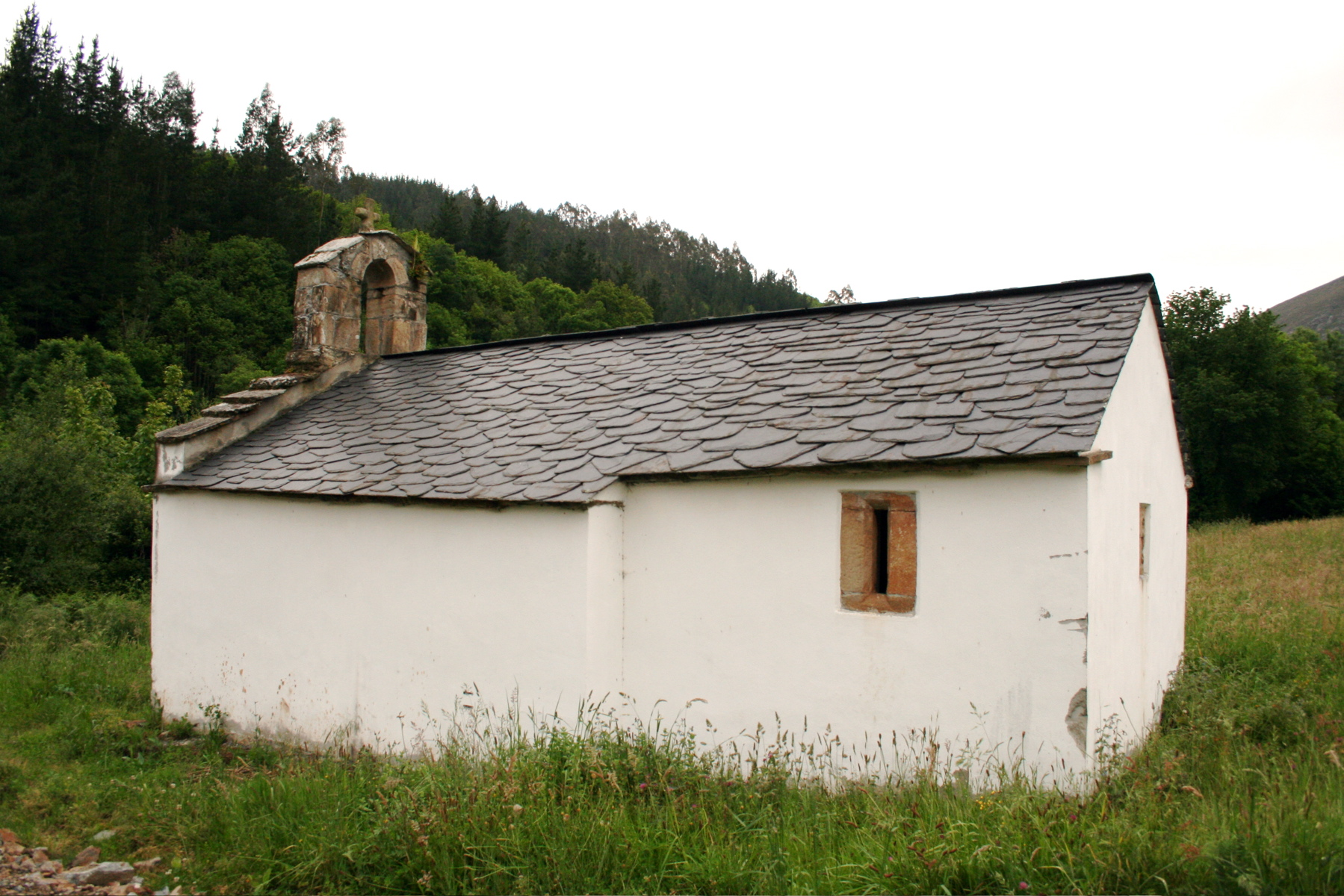
- Iglesia de San Pedro (Ese de Calleras)
- Location: Asturias, Spain

The church of San Pedro is located in the hamlet of Ese in the parish of Caeras, Asturias, Spain. The church is reported to hail from the 10th century, but there is no information available about the ancient church and only a small pre-Romanesque window has survived to the present day.

== See also ==
- Asturian art
- Catholic Church in Spain
