= Santiáu (Tinéu) =

Coordinates: 43.333333°N 6.566667°W

Santiáu (Spanish: Cerredo) is one of 44 parishes in Tinéu, a municipality within the province and autonomous community of Asturias, in northern Spain.

It has a population of 275 (INE 2005).

== Villages and hamlets ==
- Beisapía
- Colinas d'Arriba
- El Couceḷḷín
- La Fanosa
- La Mortera
- El Reḷḷón
- Ricastieḷḷu
