= Navelgas =

- Parroquia (parish)
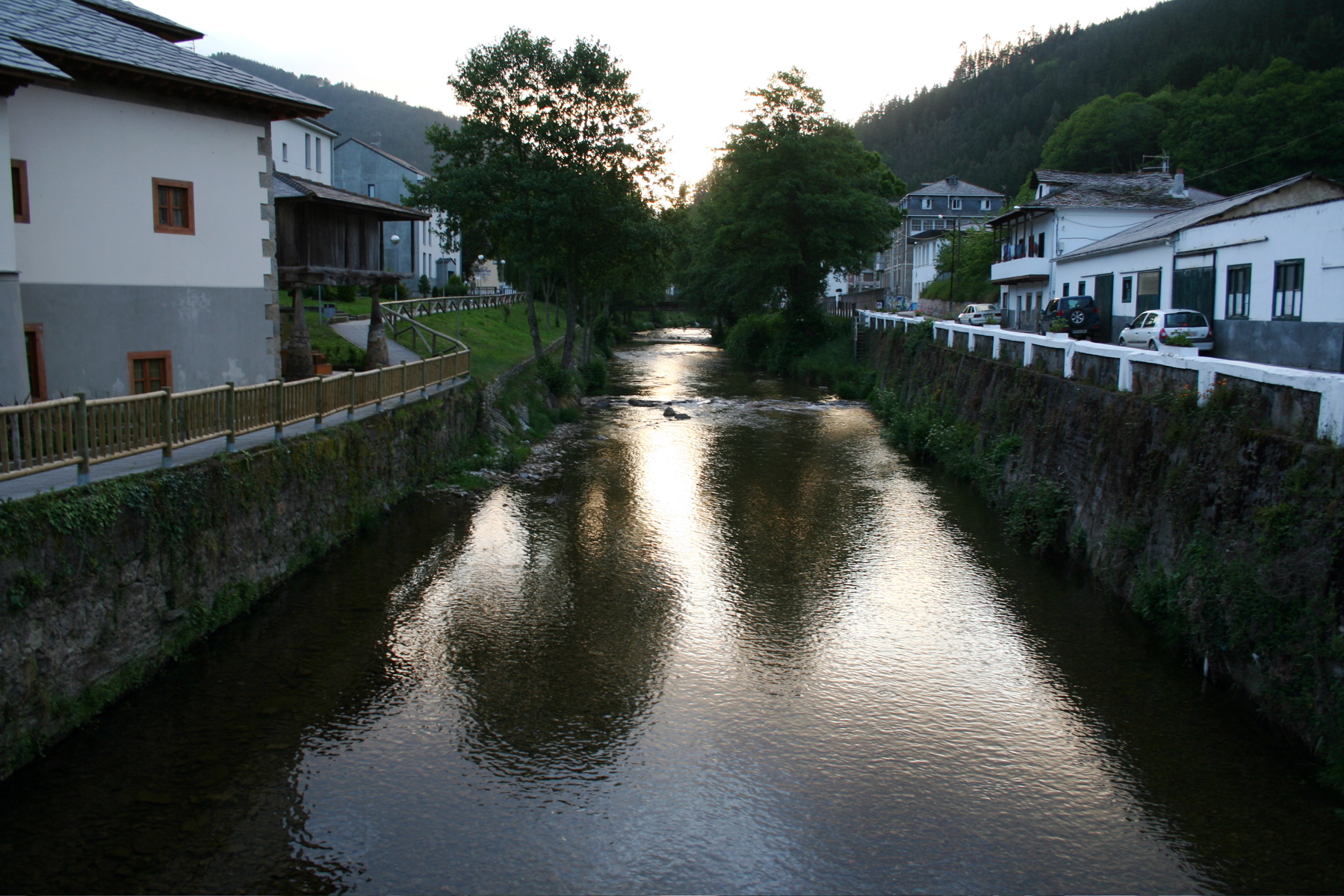
- Navelgas River

- Navelgas
- Coordinates: 43.3833°N 6.55°W
- Country: Spain
- Autonomous community: Asturias
- Province: Asturias
- Comarca: Narcea
- Concejo: Tinéu

Area
  - Total: 21.69 km^{2} (8.37 sq mi)

Population (2004)INE
  - Total: 467
  - Density: 21.5/km^{2} (55.8/sq mi)

Navelgas is one of 44 parishes (administrative divisions) in Tinéu, a municipality within the province and autonomous community of Asturias, in northern Spain.

It is 21.69 km^{2} (8.37 sq mi) in size, with a population of 467 (INE 2004).

It is the home of the Asturias Gold Museum.

== Villages and hamlets ==
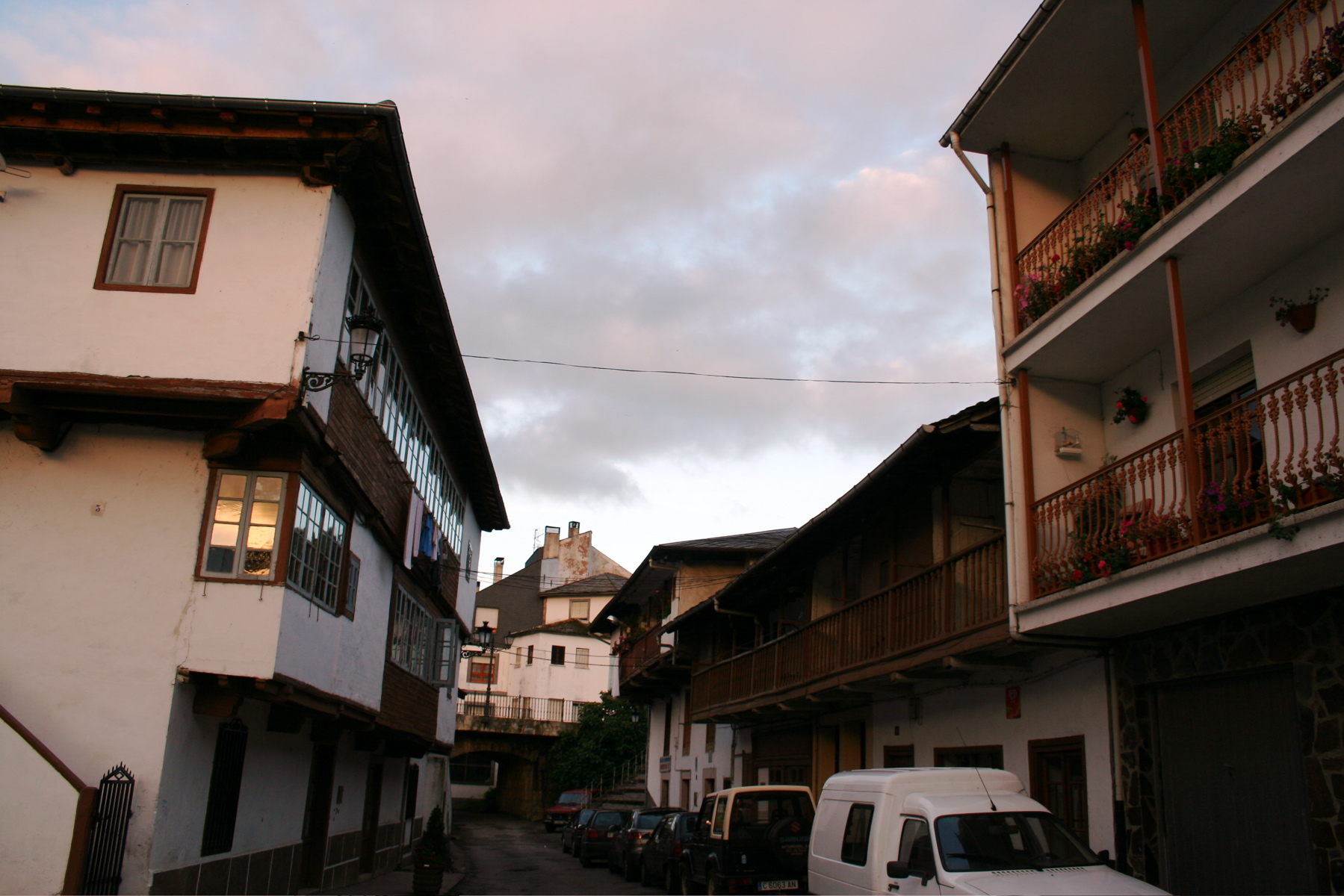
El Barriu San Nicolás, Navelgas

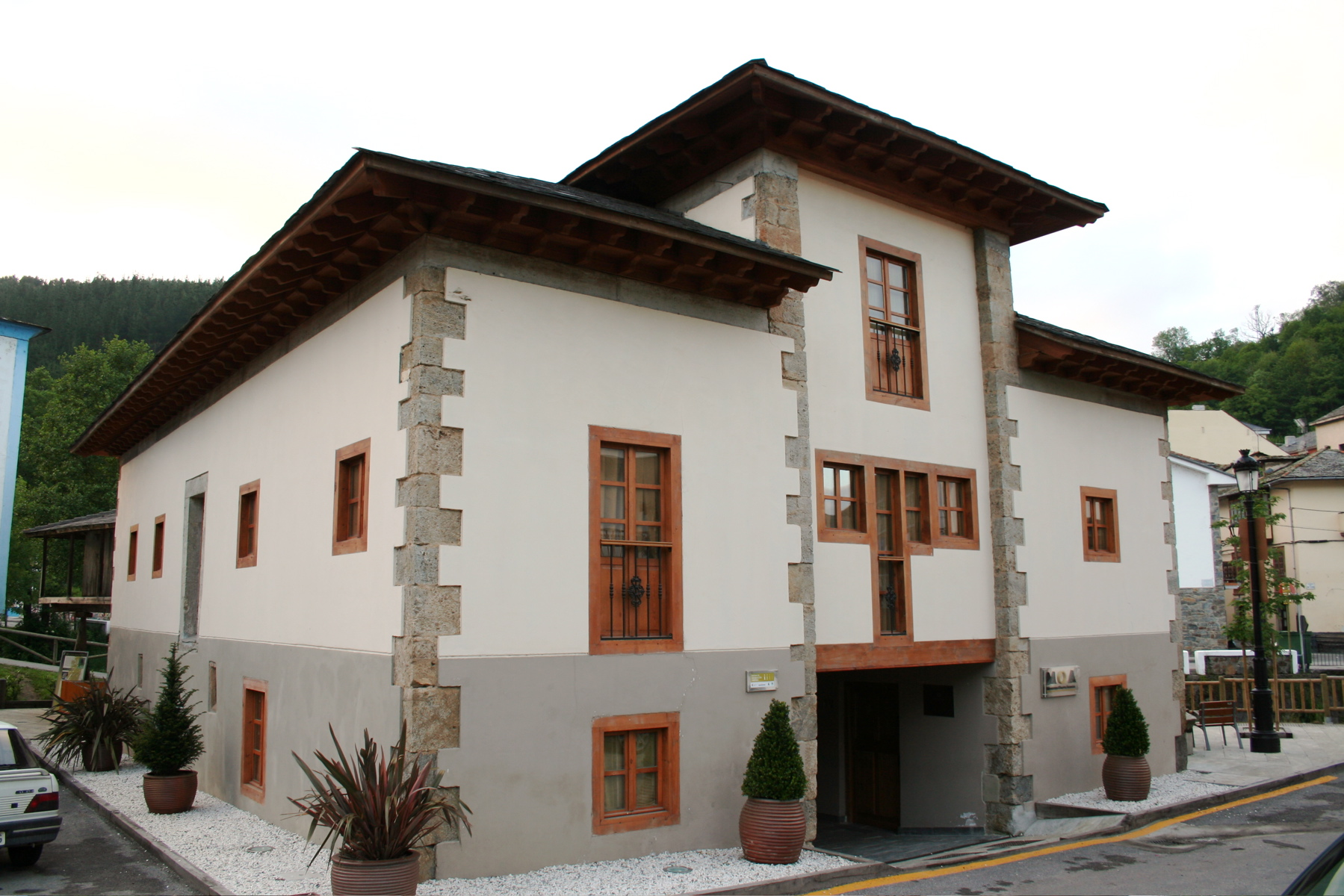
Museum of Gold in Navelgas
- La Telaya
- Barreiru
- Barzanaḷḷana
- La Carrizal
- Contu
- Foyéu
- Fontes
- Navelgas
- Sabadel
- Viḷḷar
