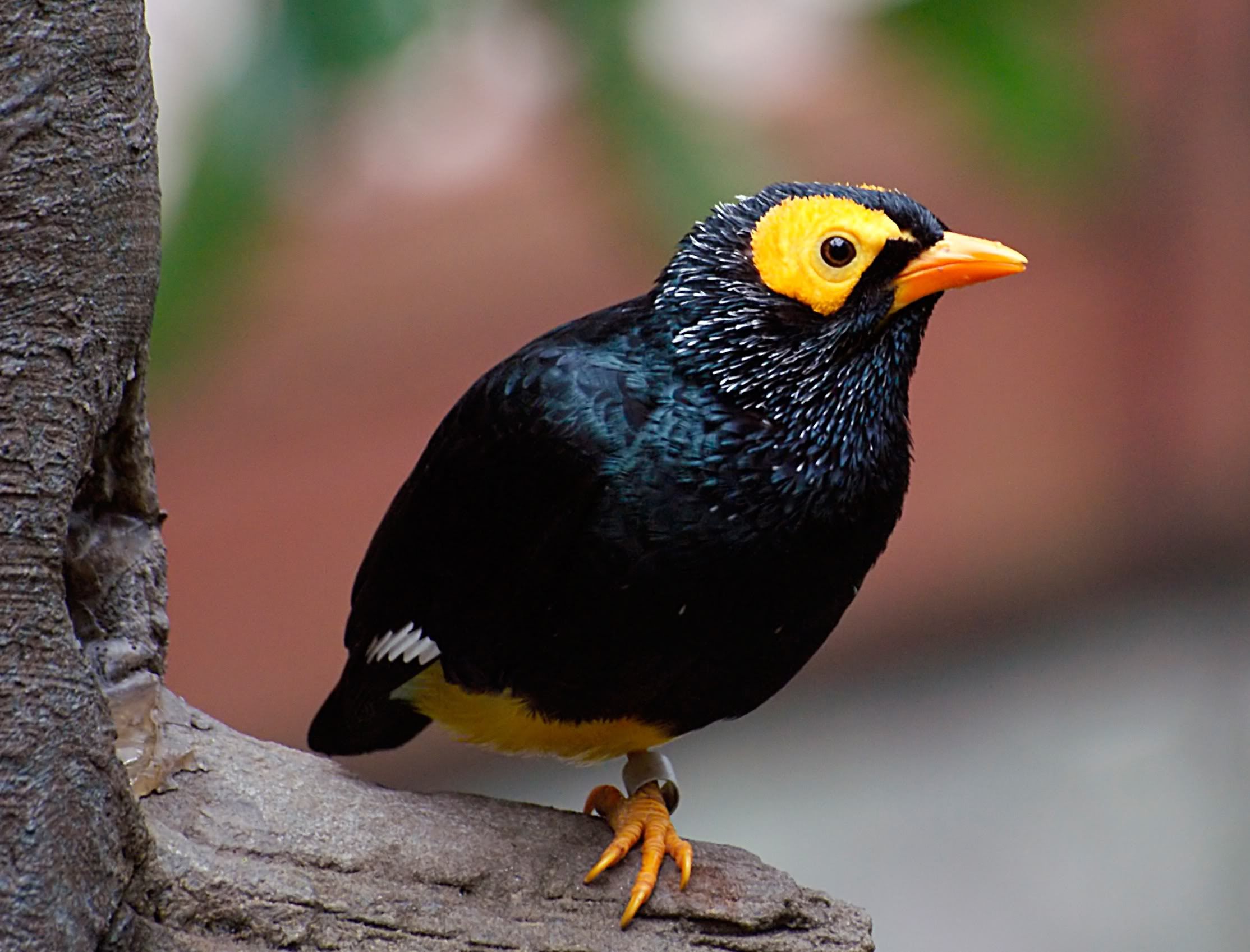

Conservation status
- Least Concern (IUCN 3.1)

Scientific classification
- Kingdom: Animalia
- Phylum: Chordata
- Class: Aves
- Order: Passeriformes
- Family: Sturnidae
- Genus: Mino
- Species: M. dumontii

Binomial name
- Mino dumontii (Lesson, 1827)

= Yellow-faced myna =

Species of bird

The yellow-faced myna (Mino dumontii) is a species of starling in the family Sturnidae. It is found in New Guinea and nearby smaller islands, where its natural habitat is subtropical or tropical moist lowland forests. The long-tailed myna was formerly included as a subspecies. One of the largest species of starling, this species attains 23 to 26 cm (9 to 10 in) in length and weighs around 217 g (7.7 oz). They have dark plumage with a metallic lustre and bright orange facial markings and beak. These birds are social and omnivorous. Their diet consists of fruit and insects for which they forage high in the canopy. They are common birds with a wide range, and the International Union for Conservation of Nature has assessed their conservation status as being of "least concern". It was named after Charles Dumont.

== Description ==
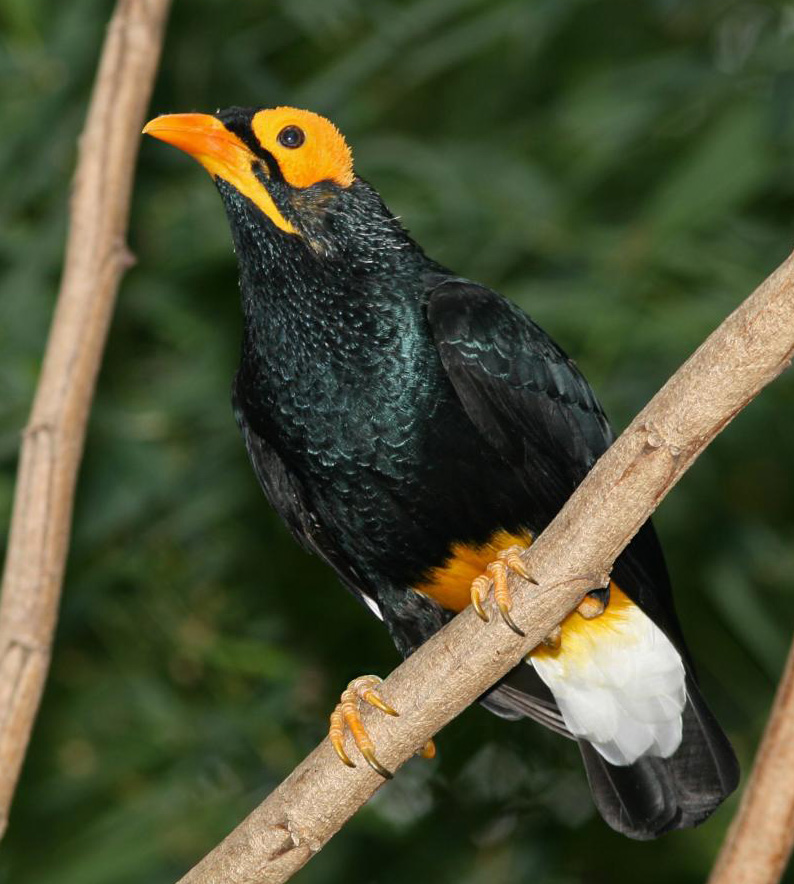
Yellow-faced myna

The yellow-faced myna grows to a length of between 23 and 26 cm (9 and 10 in) and is one of the largest species of starling.

The head has short black feathers glossed bluish-purple on the forehead and at the base of the upper mandible, but most of the head is bare yellowish-orange skin. This forms a wide patch around and behind the eye and includes a bib on the chin and the sides of the throat. The neck, central throat and mantle are black glossed with purple while the back, wings, breast and belly are black glossed with green. The rump is white, the lower belly is golden-yellow and the undertail-coverts are white. The short, squarish tail is black. The iris is usually yellow, but in some parts of New Guinea may be brown. The bill and legs are yellow.

== Distribution and habitat ==
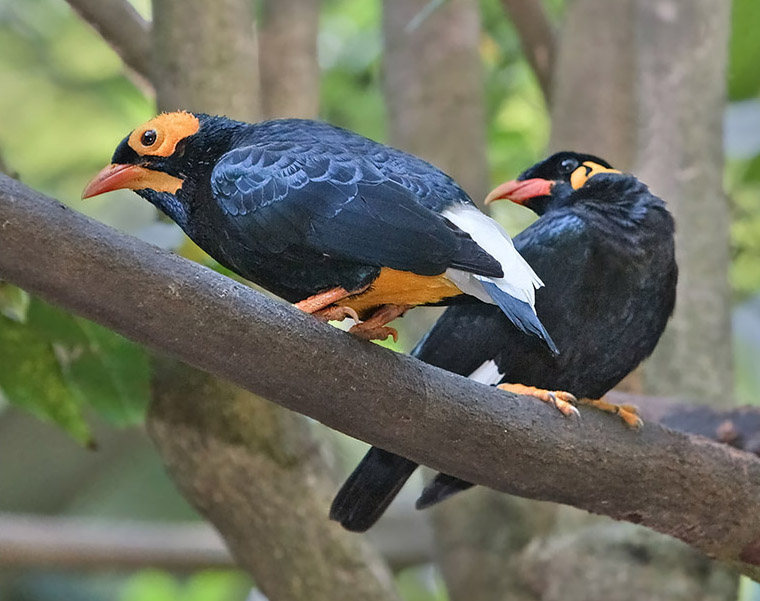
With a hill myna (Gracula sp.)

This myna is endemic to New Guinea. As well as being present on the mainland, its range extends to many of the smaller offshore islands. It is common over much of its range at altitudes of up to about 800 metres (2,600 ft) and even higher in parts of Papua New Guinea. It is not present on the southeastern coast of the mainland however. Its typical habitats include rainforests, forest fringes, partially cut areas, secondary growth and gallery forests, and it is sometimes present in savannah areas.

== Ecology ==
M. dumontii is sometimes seen in small groups but is more often found in pairs. It occasionally forms larger flocks, and communal roosts in tall trees have been described, containing over two hundred birds. It is a noisy bird, emitting a variety of "nasal, growling, and croaking calls with a sometimes human-like conversational quality". It often perches in an elevated position, calling loudly. It has a quick wing-beat and a direct flight, and pairs of birds are often seen flying together; it is possible that this species is monogamous and pairs for life.

This bird is usually found high in the canopy feeding mainly on berries and fruit, although it also feeds on small invertebrates, and it has been observed catching insects in flight. It breeds in holes and crevices in trees well above the ground. The nests are formed of twigs and one or two pale blue eggs speckled with grey and rust are laid. Three birds have been observed carrying nesting material into a single hole, so it is possible that there is some degree of cooperation from the extended family.
