= Caeras =

Coordinates: 43.416667°N 6.466667°W

Caeras (Spanish: Calleras) is one of 44 parishes (administrative divisions) in Tinéu, a municipality within the province and autonomous community of Asturias, in northern Spain.

The village of Caeras has a church of noteworthy architecture, built late in the 19th century, with enormous dimensions to accommodate its Baroque altar from a disappeared monastery in Miranda.

The parish also hosts the church of San Pedro . The church is reported to hail from the 10th century, but there is no information available about the ancient church and only a small pre-Romanesque window has survived to the present day.

== Villages and hamlets ==
- Busmión
- Busteḷḷín
- Caeras
- Ese
- La Corredoira
- Ḷḷaneces
- El Monteḷḷouso
- La Pena la Burra
- La Pila
- La Reboḷḷada
- Reḷḷousu
- Veneiru
