= Rafael del Riego =

Spanish army officer and de facto leader of Spain from 1820 to 1823, (1784–1823)

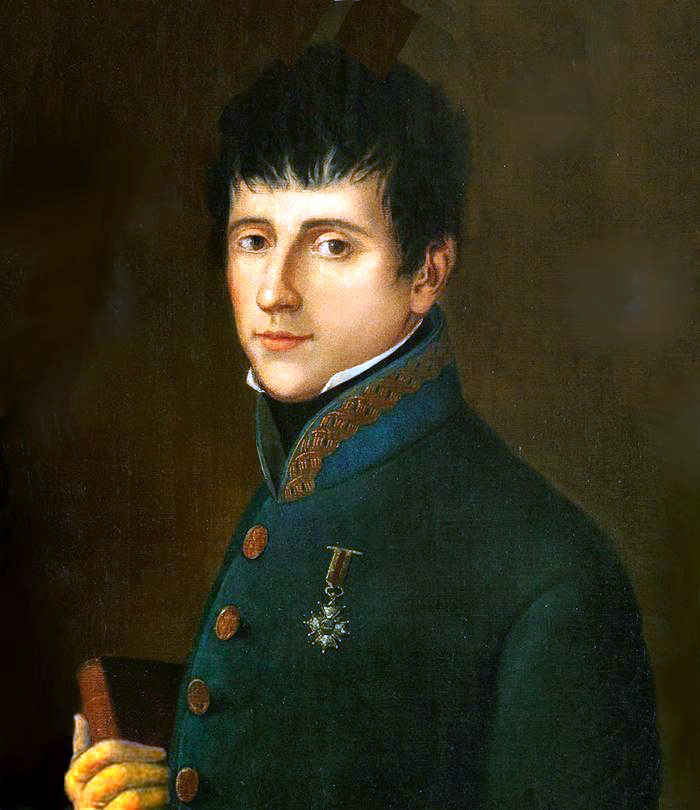
- Detail from an anonymous portrait of del Riego
- Born: 7 April 1784; Tuña, Spain
- Died: 7 November 1823 (aged 39); Madrid, Spain
- Military career
- Allegiance: Spain
- Branch: Spanish Army
- Service years: 1807–1822
- Rank: Captain general
- Conflicts: Peninsular War; Riego revolt; Spanish American wars of independence

Captain-General Rafael del Riego y Flórez (7 April 1784 – 7 November 1823) was a Spanish Army officer and politician who played a key role in the Liberal Triennium (Trienio Liberal in Spanish). Riego’s liberal uprising marked a turning point in the Spanish American wars of independence.

== Early life ==
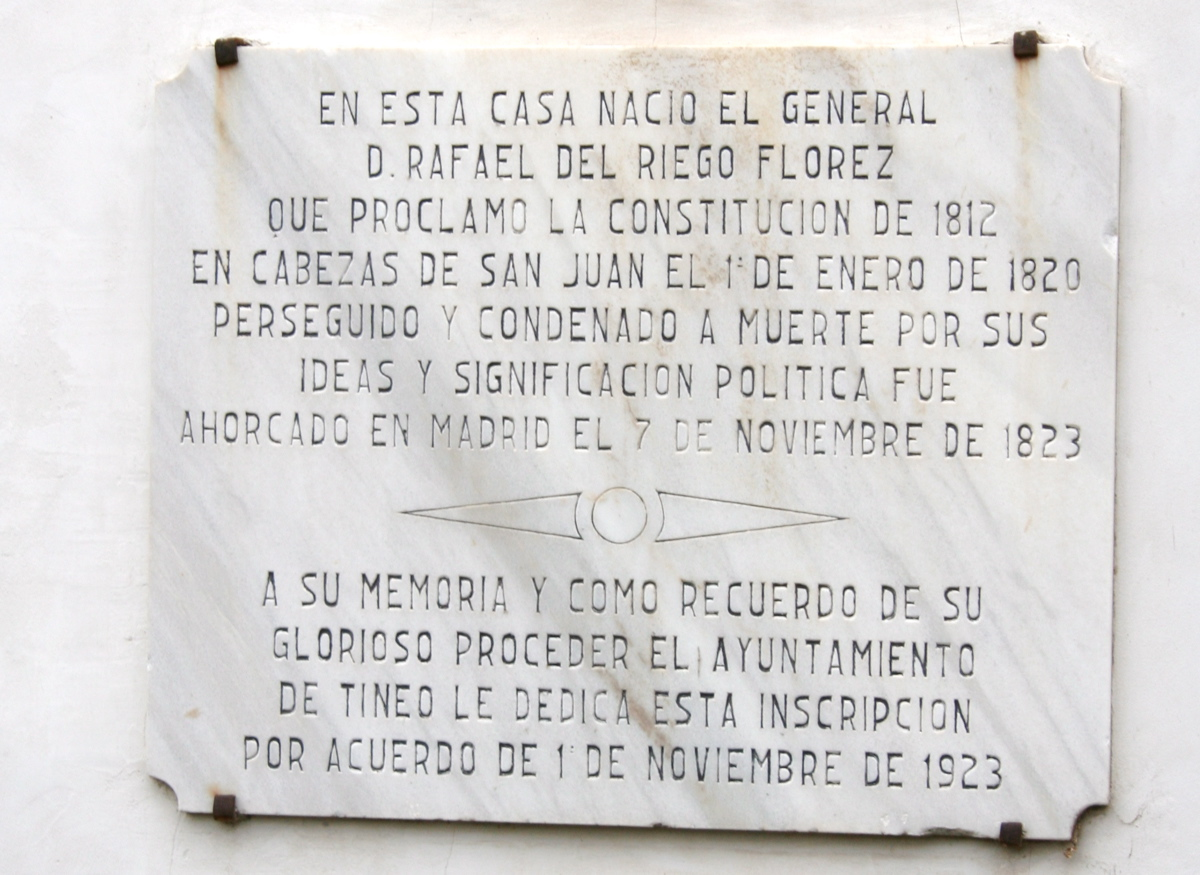
Commemorative plaque at del Riego's birthplace in Tuña

Riego was born on 7 April 1784 in Tuña, Asturias. After graduating in Law from the University of Oviedo in 1807, he moved to Madrid to join the Royal Guard. In March 1808 his company was involved in the Tumult of Aranjuez and dissolved.

== Peninsular War ==
In November 1808, as a captain and aide-de-camp to General Vicente María de Acevedo, he fought at the Battle of Espinosa de los Monteros, after which he once again was taken prisoner. Sent to France, he remained there until January 1814, when he managed to escape and make his way to England, where he joined a unit of foreign soldiers raised by the British government to send to Spain.

Returning shortly before the Spanish Constitution of 1812 was abolished by King Fernando VII, Riego was appointed a captain in the Infantry Regiment of the Princess (Regimiento de Infantería de la Princesa) in 1814. During the six years of absolutism that followed the restoration of the king, Spanish liberals wished to restore the Spanish Constitution, which the King had abolished in May 1814.

== 1820 revolt ==
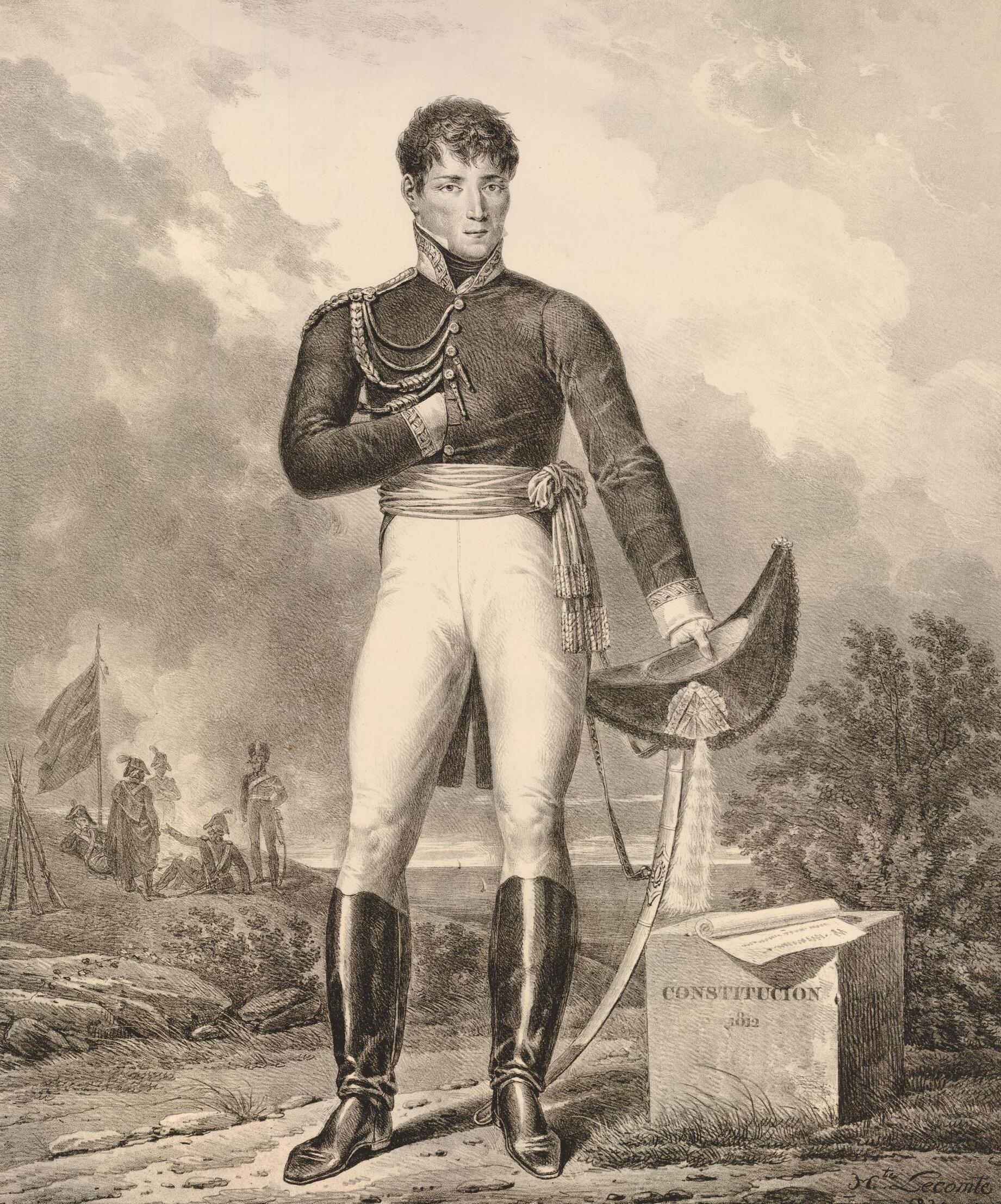
Engraving of del Riego after a Hippolyte Lecomte portrait, 1820

Having joined the Ejército de Ultramar, the expeditionary force commanded by Enrique O'Donnell, Conde de La Bisbal, that was being prepared to put down the Spanish American wars of independence, and later promoted to lieutenant colonel, Riego was incorporated into the Asturian Battalion, then under the command of Evaristo San Miguel, at Las Cabezas de San Juan (Seville). However, the Expeditionary Force, numbering some twenty thousand men, was unable to embark due to the lack of transport ships. Moreover, the troops themselves were badly equipped and morale in general was very low.

San Miguel, from Asturias, like Riego, had also been deported for his liberal ideas and was, at that moment, involved in a plot with other army officers and leading members of the bourgeoisie in Cádiz, including people like Istúriz, Alcalá Galiano, Antonio Quiroga and Mendizábal. However, the plot was discovered when the plotters tried to recruit General Sarsfield, the second-in-command of the expeditionary force, San Miguel, Quiroga, O'Daly and Roten among others, were arrested. With the leading plotters imprisoned, Riego decided to go ahead with the mutiny and on 1 January 1820, at the head of his battalion at Cabezas de San Juan proclaimed the restoration of the Spanish Constitution of 1812, the start of what is known as the Pronunciamiento de Riego, a major event in the historiography of Liberalism and radicalism in Spain, along with the Liberal Triennium.

Riego's troops marched through the cities of Andalusia with the hope of starting an anti-absolutist uprising, but the local population was mostly indifferent. An uprising, however, took place in Galicia, and quickly spread throughout Spain. On 7 March 1820, the royal palace in Madrid was surrounded by soldiers under the command of General Francisco Ballesteros, and on 10 March, the King agreed to restore the Constitution.

== The Great Overseas Expedition ==
The Great Overseas Expedition (Gran Expedición de Ultramar) was a large Spanish military expedition assembled at Cádiz between 1819 and 1820 to reinforce royalist forces in Spanish America and suppress the independence movements. Commanded by Enrique José O'Donnell, Count of La Bisbal, with the naval forces under Francisco Mourelle, it was the largest expeditionary force Spain prepared after the expedition of Pablo Morillo in 1815. Estimates of its strength range from 20,000 to 25,000 troops, supported by a fleet of ships of the line, frigates, corvettes and transport vessels.

The expedition was never dispatched because the uprising led by Rafael del Riego on 1 January 1820 forced King Ferdinand VII to restore the Constitution of 1812. The revolt, supported by troops assigned to the expedition, prevented its departure and deprived Spain of the reinforcements intended for the royalist armies in America. According to Anthony H. Hull, Riego's liberal uprising marked "the death knell of the Spanish Empire in mainland America".

The uprising led by Rafael del Riego began on 1 January 1820 at Las Cabezas de San Juan. Its purpose was to restore the Constitution of 1812, and it was supported by troops belonging to the army intended to suppress definitively the rebellions in Spain's American territories. This force was known as the Great Overseas Expedition (es:Gran Expedición de Ultramar), also called the Great Expedition or the “great expedition overseas”.

After the serious difficulties encountered in organising Pablo Morillo's army in 1815 to suppress the rebellions in America, conditions were even worse for sending a second army in 1820. Regarding the first major force, it has traditionally been argued that it was originally intended to be sent against Buenos Aires. However, the fall of Montevideo, the principal Spanish stronghold in the Río de la Plata, the revolutionary successes in the Venezuelan Captaincy General and the United Provinces of New Granada, the greater proximity of the Isthmus of Panama, which was under threat of invasion (Portobelo campaign - 1819), and the economic importance of Peru, which would otherwise be isolated in the Pacific, led to the expedition being redirected towards Cartagena de Indias.

Morillo sailed from Cádiz on 15 February 1815. On 9 May, King Ferdinand VII announced by decree that the fleet was being sent against Costa Firme, that further reinforcements would soon be sent to Panama and Peru, and that a second expedition was being prepared against the Río de la Plata. The latter force was to consist of 20,000 infantrymen, 1,500 cavalrymen and the corresponding artillery. Until it reached Puerto Santo, near Carúpano, Venezuela, on 7 April, the expedition caused widespread alarm, particularly in Buenos Aires. Because false reports and rumours circulated continuously, it was also believed that the expedition might be directed towards Peru and the Captaincy General of Chile.

A second force began to be organised in mid-1816 under the direction of the Minister of the Navy, José Vázquez de Figueroa, but the project subsequently languished. On 2 November 1816, Brigadier Francisco Mourelle was appointed commander-in-chief of the expedition's naval forces. Two years after Morillo's expedition, the disappointing results of the war had changed the government's position. On 9 November 1816, the Council of the Indies concluded that sending Morillo's costly and well-equipped expedition to Venezuela—while Montevideo had been retained as a diversion—instead of reinforcing Mexico, the most important territory, had been a mistake that altered the course of the war. At the end of the colonial period, Mexican revenues represented approximately 90 per cent of all revenue remitted from Spanish America.

It appeared reasonable that, since insurrection existed in both Americas and in territories widely separated from one another, while the metropolis was unable even to provide for itself, all possible efforts should be concentrated upon the most important point and upon that where success would be less difficult, namely New Spain. With a viceroy possessing the appropriate qualities, carefully selected officers and a small land and naval force, it could have been pacified in a short time and public order firmly maintained. The government would thereby have gained great prestige, the example would have intimidated troublemakers everywhere, and the Kingdom of Mexico, which was powerful in its own right, would have provided support for operations elsewhere. Instead, an expedition was planned for the Río de la Plata which, because of its size, could not depart in time; its objective was then changed and it was sent to Venezuela. —AGI, Estado 88.

In 1817 only limited reinforcements were assigned to Peru and Chile, and these sailed the following year aboard ships purchased from Russia. Their acquisition under the Treaty of Madrid (1817) was controversial because no officers of the Spanish Navy had accompanied the royal clique responsible for the purchase in order to inspect the ships' condition, which proved to be poor. The vessels were described as obsolete, inefficient and unsatisfactory in both sanitary and navigational terms.

The project for a major expedition was revived when news reached Madrid of the danger created by the loss of Chile in 1818. First, it was no longer possible to recover the Río de la Plata from the Viceroyalty of Peru. Second, the Pacific coast as far north as Mexico had been left exposed. Third, the Viceroyalty of Peru itself was threatened, and the king urgently summoned his privy council. One of its members, Joaquín Gómez de Liaño, proposed sending at least 16,000 men to Buenos Aires. However, a lack of resources and the complications created by the Luso-Brazilian invasion of the Banda Oriental—which could have brought Portuguese forces into conflict with the expedition—led the government to give priority to sending reinforcements to Havana and New Spain, and warships to Lima, Havana, Veracruz and Venezuela. Another factor was pressure from influential groups that regarded the Río de la Plata as a peripheral region of the monarchy and believed that protecting trade with New Spain and the Caribbean should take priority. Finally, after the Congress of Aix-la-Chapelle, Spain recognised that the other European powers would not support it in preserving its empire and were, in fact, more interested in its collapse.

The Great Expedition was organised by the former viceroy of New Spain and captain general of Andalusia, Félix María Calleja del Rey. By the end of 1819 its land forces assembled at Cádiz and the Isle of León consisted of 20,200 infantrymen, 2,800 cavalrymen and 1,370 artillerymen, equipped with 94 field guns, additional lighter pieces and substantial quantities of ammunition. Shortly afterwards, however, an epidemic of yellow fever broke out. The force included fourteen cavalry squadrons.

The commander of the expedition and its army was Enrique José O'Donnell, Count of La Bisbal, a Spaniard of Irish descent who was nicknamed the “viceroy of the Río de la Plata”. Some sources state that O'Donnell was subsequently replaced by Calleja. The naval forces, commanded by Francisco Mourelle, were to escort the transport vessels and included four ships of the line, between three and six frigates, between four and ten brigs, two corvettes, four brig-schooners, two schooners and thirty gunboats. The fleet was crewed by 6,000 sailors. Estimates of the total number of men vary between 14,000, 20,000, 22,000 and 25,000.

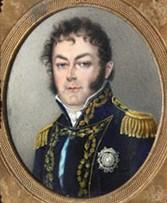
Juan Martín de Pueyrredón claimed in his 1829 pamphlet Refutation of an Atrocious Calumny that, as the leading official of the self-proclaimed United Provinces of the Río de la Plata, he had promoted and financed Riego's uprising.

Regarding the failure of the Great Expedition, Spanish American historiography—and Argentine historiography in particular—has attributed “a major role to the American agents who participated in the uprising of 1820”. The Spanish historian José María García León has nevertheless noted that “the role played by these agents in the events, as well as their relationship with Freemasonry, has not yet been clearly established”. García León also records that Andrés Arguibel, “a wealthy Buenos Aires merchant” and “supporter of the independence of the province of the Río de la Plata”, was living in Cádiz and established contact with the Count of La Bisbal. Whether because of his discretion or “the extraordinary confusion of the Spanish authorities”, his activities went unnoticed. This contrasted with the experience of a wealthy Peruvian merchant who was investigated, although the allegation that he had received money from Gibraltar proved unfounded, and with that of two alleged Spanish American independence agents who were arrested and expelled from Cádiz.

Arguibel was assisted by another Río de la Plata merchant resident in Cádiz, Tomás Antonio de Lezica, and together they contributed to Riego's uprising with “one thousand pairs of shoes and twelve thousand pesos fuertes”. Nine years after the uprising, in 1829, Juan Martín de Pueyrredón explained in Refutation of an Atrocious Calumny that, as the leading official of the self-proclaimed United Provinces of the Río de la Plata, he had been one of the principal instigators of Riego's uprising, which had caused the failure of the Great Overseas Expedition prepared to suppress the independence rebellions in Spain's American territories. The Refutation was a reply to what Pueyrredón called an “atrocious calumny” made against him by the new United States minister to Spain, Alexander Hill Everett, who had accused him of collusion with the Spanish government.

Excerpt from the Refutation of an Atrocious Calumny, written by Juan Martín de Pueyrredón in 1829. Pueyrredón claimed that he had issued “a considerable number of letters of marque, offering a reward for every Spanish transport ship that was captured”, and had authorised Tomás de Lezica and Andrés Arguibel, on behalf of the Argentine government, to “spend whatever sums of money were necessary”.

Pueyrredón stated that, among other measures intended to prevent the expedition from reaching America, he had issued “a considerable number of letters of marque, offering a reward for every Spanish transport ship that was captured”. He also claimed that he had ultimately undertaken “the task of inciting mutiny in the very army that was intended to bring about our ruin”. To achieve this, he contacted Ambrosio de Lezica, asking him in turn to communicate with his brother Tomás de Lezica, who lived in Cádiz, “so that he might establish relations with the commanders of that army”. Pueyrredón continued:

Their replies opened a promising field to my hopes, and from that moment the means necessary to achieve this purpose were put into operation. Don Tomás Lezica and Don Andrés Arguibel, natives of Buenos Aires and reputable merchants established in Cádiz, were the agents who brought that hazardous enterprise to completion. They were authorised to spend whatever sums of money were necessary and empowered to pledge the responsibility of the government for everything they did in pursuit of the objective. The effectiveness and skill with which they acted became evident in the result. The army on the Isle of León rose in rebellion; the terrible expedition that threatened us was turned against the very power that had assembled it; and by this means the Argentine Republic found itself free and triumphant over its enemies. Eternal honour to the names of Lezica and Arguibel among the friends of liberty! Should anyone doubt the accuracy of these events, let him read the memoir written and published by General Quiroga, one of the leading commanders of that army, and he will find confirmation of the effective cooperation provided by the government of the Republic in that uprising, as well as evidence that the financial assistance supplied by its agents facilitated the execution of the enterprise.

On the basis of Pueyrredón's Refutation, Spanish American historiography in general, and Argentine historiography in particular, has maintained that the two Río de la Plata independence agents—and Pueyrredón from Buenos Aires—played an important role in Riego's uprising.

In 1877, the Argentine politician and historian Bartolomé Mitre, in his Historia de Belgrano y de la Independencia Argentina, repeated the claims contained in the Refutation. He added that Quiroga himself had written in the insurgents' bulletin during the first days of the uprising, when Argentine ships near Cádiz had established contact with them: “Our brothers in South America will join us in defence of our cause, and we shall receive powerful assistance from them.” Mitre also cited an official file listing the sums paid by Tomás Lezica and Andrés Arguibel, charged to Ambrosio de Lezica and subsequently reimbursed by the Argentine treasury.

The Spanish historian Demetrio Ramos Pérez also discussed the interpretation advanced by Argentine historiography, citing José León Suárez's Carácter de la revolución americana, published in 1919, and the work of José Miguel Torre Revello (1962). According to this interpretation, two agents from the United Provinces of the Río de la Plata, directed and financed from Buenos Aires by Juan Martín de Pueyrredón and by his successor as head of the United Provinces, José Rondeau, made payments “to the Freemasonry of Cádiz” and “to the commanders of the units that were to go to America”. Funds from Buenos Aires reached the two agents through Gibraltar, which they frequently visited from their residence in Cádiz.

Ramos Pérez nevertheless argued that the “underlying cause” of Riego's uprising was “discontent within the army”, which was “general and affected every garrison”, principally because “the officers were not receiving their pay and arrears were accumulating”. As immediate causes, he identified the “support” received by the conspirators from Cádiz merchants whose businesses had been paralysed by the Spanish American wars of independence—including the activities of privateers—and by British commercial competition in the colonies. He also emphasised the work carried out among the troops by the officers involved in the conspiracy, citing the unpublished memoirs of Ramón de Santillán.

They showed [the troops] that those who survived the dangers of a long voyage such as that to Buenos Aires, where the expedition was headed, could expect no other fate than that suffered by General Pablo Morillo's men on the Spanish Main: death after the most extraordinary hardships.

Some historians maintain that the expeditionary plan was to land near Montevideo and seize the city, where support for the Spanish cause probably still existed. This would have provided the expedition with a secure base in the Río de la Plata from which to begin operations and obtain the support of local royalists. A force would subsequently have advanced against Buenos Aires. Once the Río de la Plata had been pacified, the Great Expedition would have proceeded to Chile and then assisted Peru, which was threatened from the north by Bolívar and from the south by San Martín. The prospect of the Great Expedition's arrival may have been one reason why San Martín did not sail from Chile to Peru until September 1820.

The plan was very similar to that proposed by Viceroy José Fernando de Abascal, who complained in his memoirs that Morillo's expedition had been sent to Venezuela and New Granada rather than to the Río de la Plata. According to Abascal, it had been a mistake to send such a force into tropical and marshy regions, where European soldiers were soon decimated by malaria, yellow fever and other tropical diseases. Had the original plan been followed, they would have gone to a region with a climate more similar to that of Spain and would have been supported by Peruvian offensives in Charcas and Chile. They could then have sailed to Quito, entered the Bogotá highlands from the south and finally advanced into the tropical regions of Cartagena and Venezuela.

Other historians, however, maintain that the Great Expedition was in fact intended for Mexico in order to secure the most valuable part of the monarchy, and that the announced destination of the Río de la Plata was another deception similar to that used for Morillo's expedition to Venezuela.

Ferdinand VII returned to the old project of subjugating us and prepared a great expedition which he called the “Buenos Aires expedition”. This was the report he spread and caused even the Argentines themselves to believe, leading them to prepare their defences; but in reality it was intended for the Kingdom of Mexico. His secret camarilla had represented to him that, since this was the most valuable part of the monarchy because of its wealth, population and greater proximity to Spain, it should be secured at all costs, after which possession of it would permit the recovery of the other territories in both Americas. Convinced of this, Ferdinand entrusted the expedition to Calleja, having first honoured him with the title of Count of Calderón, as the person best suited to carry out the enterprise because of his knowledge of the country.

== Later life ==
The new progressive government promoted Riego to field marshal and appointed him Captain General of Galicia, post which he did not assume and, in January 1821, he took up a new appointment as Captain General of Aragon, and moved to Zaragoza. On 18 June, he married his cousin Maria Teresa del Riego. On 4 September 1821, because of a failed republican revolt, he was demoted and transferred to barracks at Lleida and, later, to Castelló de Farfaña.

However, Riego's popularity grew, and in March 1822, he was elected to the Cortes Generales and became the president of the Cortes the following February.

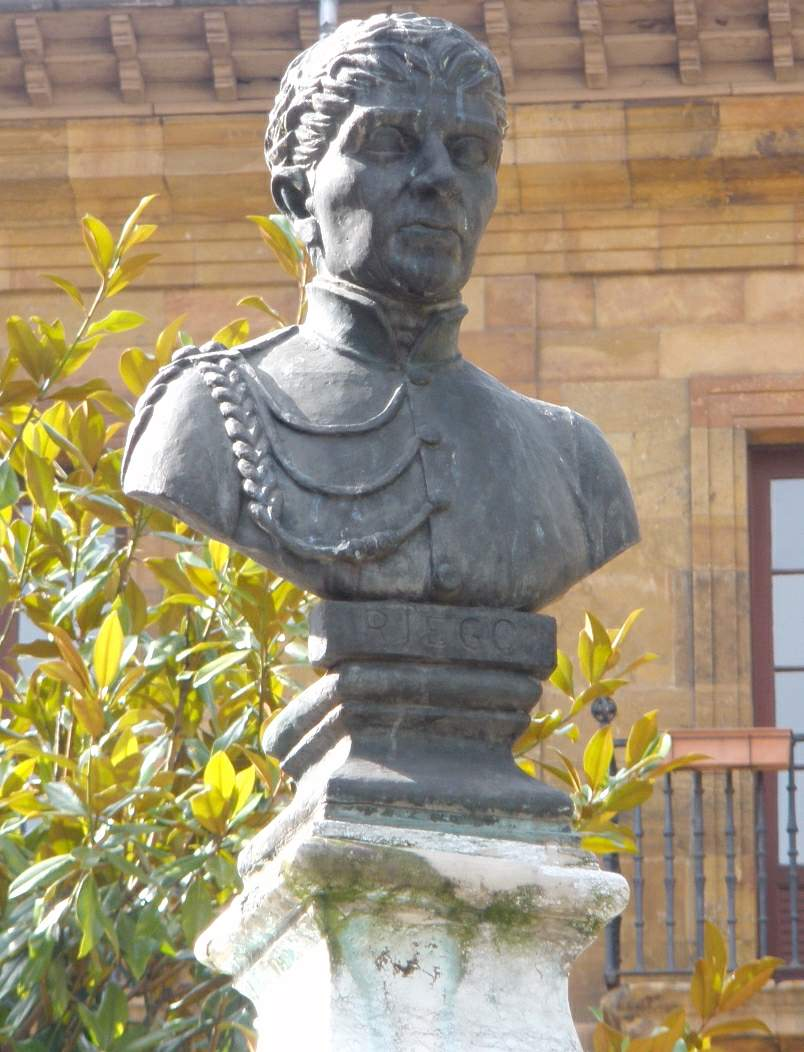
Bust of del Riego in Oviedo

Meanwhile, in December 1822, at the Congress of Verona, the Quintuple Alliance countries had decided that a Spain bordering on republicanism was a threat to the balance of Europe, and France was chosen to force a restoring of the absolute monarchy in Spain. On 7 April 1823, the French army crossed over the Pyrennes. Riego resigned from the presidency of the Cortes and took command of the Third Army, which never actually entered into combat. On 15 September he was taken prisoner near the village of Arquillos, Jaén and sent to Madrid.

Despite asking for clemency from the King, having approached religion and repented of his "constitutional crimes" during his imprisonment, completely retracting at the last minute his political convictions to the delight of the absolutists, Riego was found guilty of high treason against altar and throne, as he was one of the members of parliament who voted in favor of taking the power from the King. On 7 November 1823, he was hanged at La Cebada Square in Madrid.

== Legacy ==
The Himno de Riego, a song written in honour of Riego by his friend Evaristo Fernández de San Miguel, became the anthem of the First (1873–1874) and Second Spanish Republic (1931–1939). A portrait of Riego is displayed in the building of the Cortes Generales. Riego was perceived as a "civic hero" by the Russian Decemberists.

== Sources ==
- Gandía, Enrique de (1955). Napoleón y la independencia de América (in Spanish). Buenos Aires: Ediciones Antonio Zamora.
- Gandía, Enrique de (1970). "El fracaso de la Expedición de Cádiz". Revista de la Junta de Estudios Históricos de Mendoza (in Spanish). I (6).
- García de Flöel, Maricel (2000). La oposición española a la revolución por la independencia en el Río de la Plata entre 1810 y 1820: parámetros políticos y jurídicos para la suerte de los españoles europeos (in Spanish). Hamburg: LIT Verlag Münster. ISBN 978-3-8258-4627-5.
- García León, José María (1993). La masonería gaditana: Desde los orígenes hasta 1833 (in Spanish). Quorum Libros. ISBN 84-88599-01-3. Archived from the original on 10 February 2009.
- Mitre, Bartolomé (1877). Historia de Belgrano y de la Independencia Argentina (in Spanish). Vol. III. Buenos Aires: Imprenta y Librería de Mayo.
- Ramos Pérez, Demetrio (1996). España en la independencia de América (in Spanish). Colección América 92. Madrid: Editorial MAPFRE. ISBN 84-7100-670-7.
- Torre Revello, José (1962). "El fracaso de la expedición española preparada contra el Río de la Plata (1818–1820)". Boletín de la Academia Nacional de la Historia (in Spanish). Buenos Aires: 421–433.
