= San Fliz (Tinéu) =

Coordinates: 43.15°N 6.666667°W

San Fliz (Spanish: San Félix) is one of 44 parishes (administrative divisions) in Tinéu, a municipality within the province and autonomous community of Asturias, in northern Spain.

It is 13.72 km^{2} (5.30 sq mi) in size, with a population of 215 (INE 2007).

== Villages and hamlets ==
- Agoveda
- Cabanas
- Eiros
- Ḷḷau
- La Piñera
- Ablaneda
- San Fliz
