= Fastias =

Parish in Tineo, Asturias, Spain

Coordinates: 43.4°N 6.433333°W

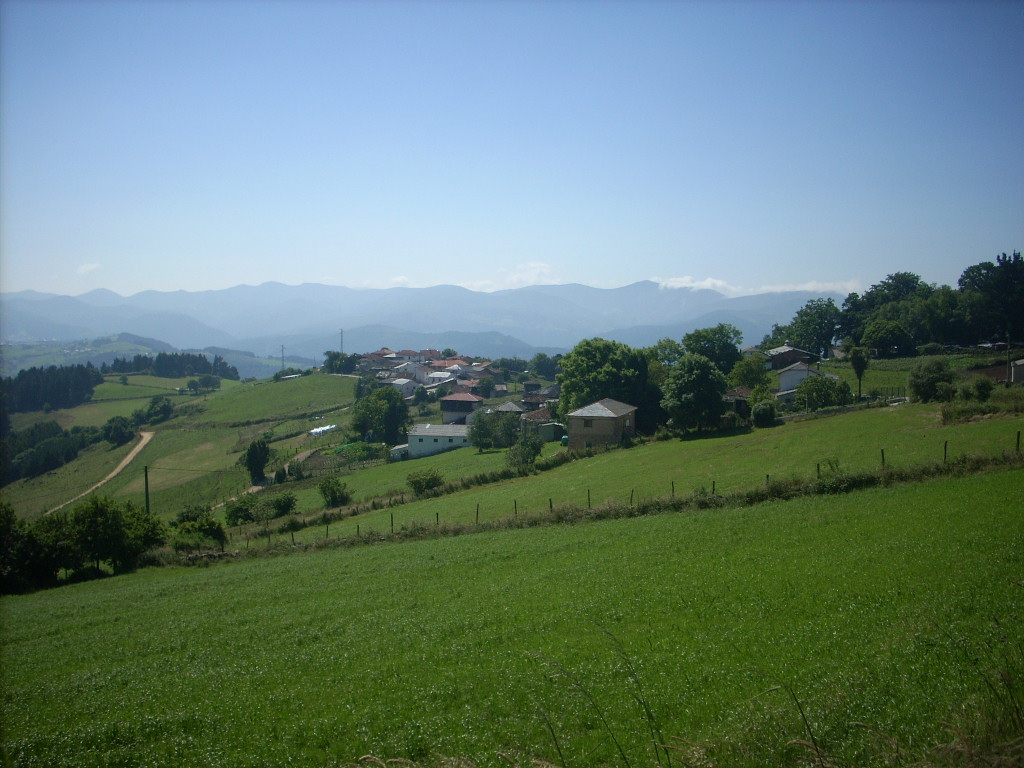
Fastias

Fastias is one of 44 parishes (administrative divisions) in Tinéu, a municipality within the province and autonomous community of Asturias, in northern Spain.

It has a population of 75.

== Villages and hamlets ==
- El Fondar
- Los Cepones
- Les Paniciegas
- Penafolgueiros
- Fastias
