= Tuña =

Coordinates: 43.266667°N 6.366667°W

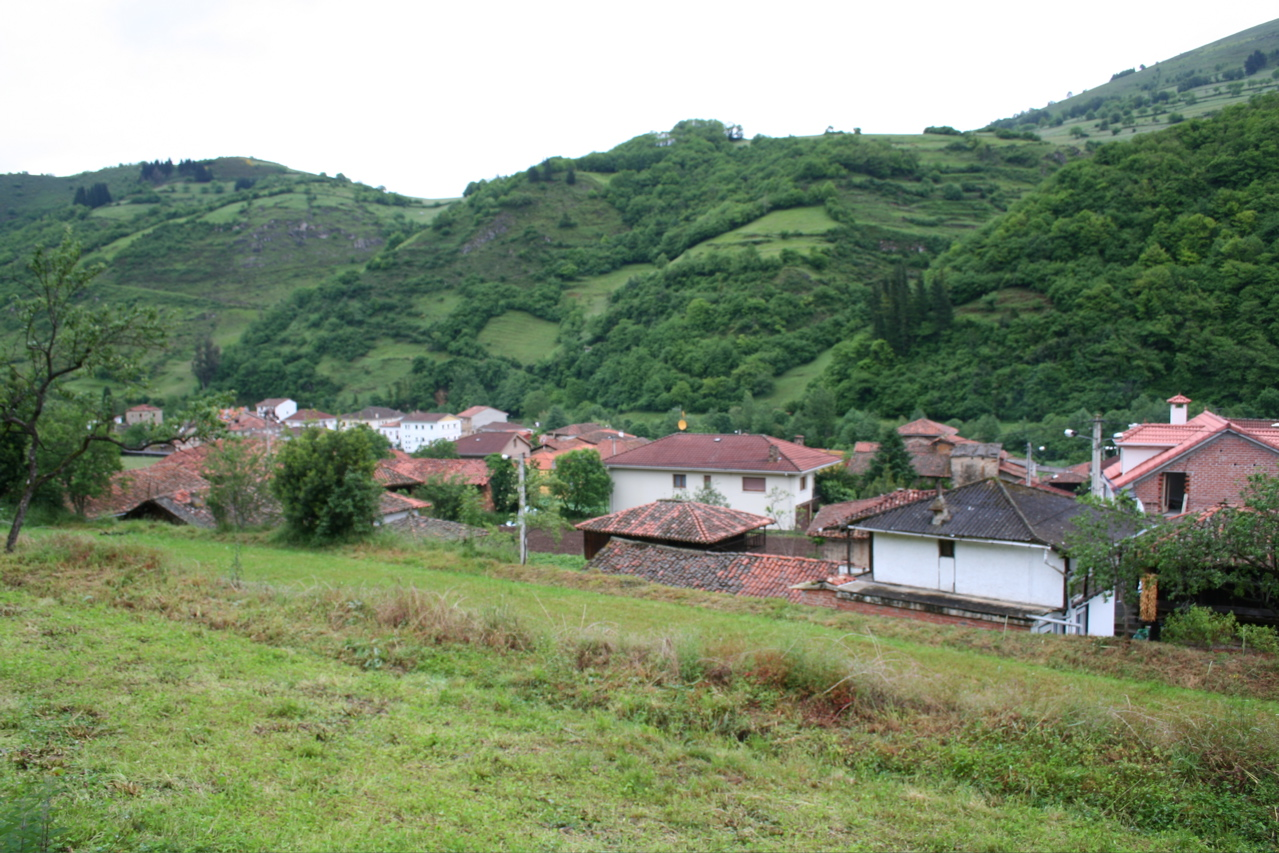
View of Tuña

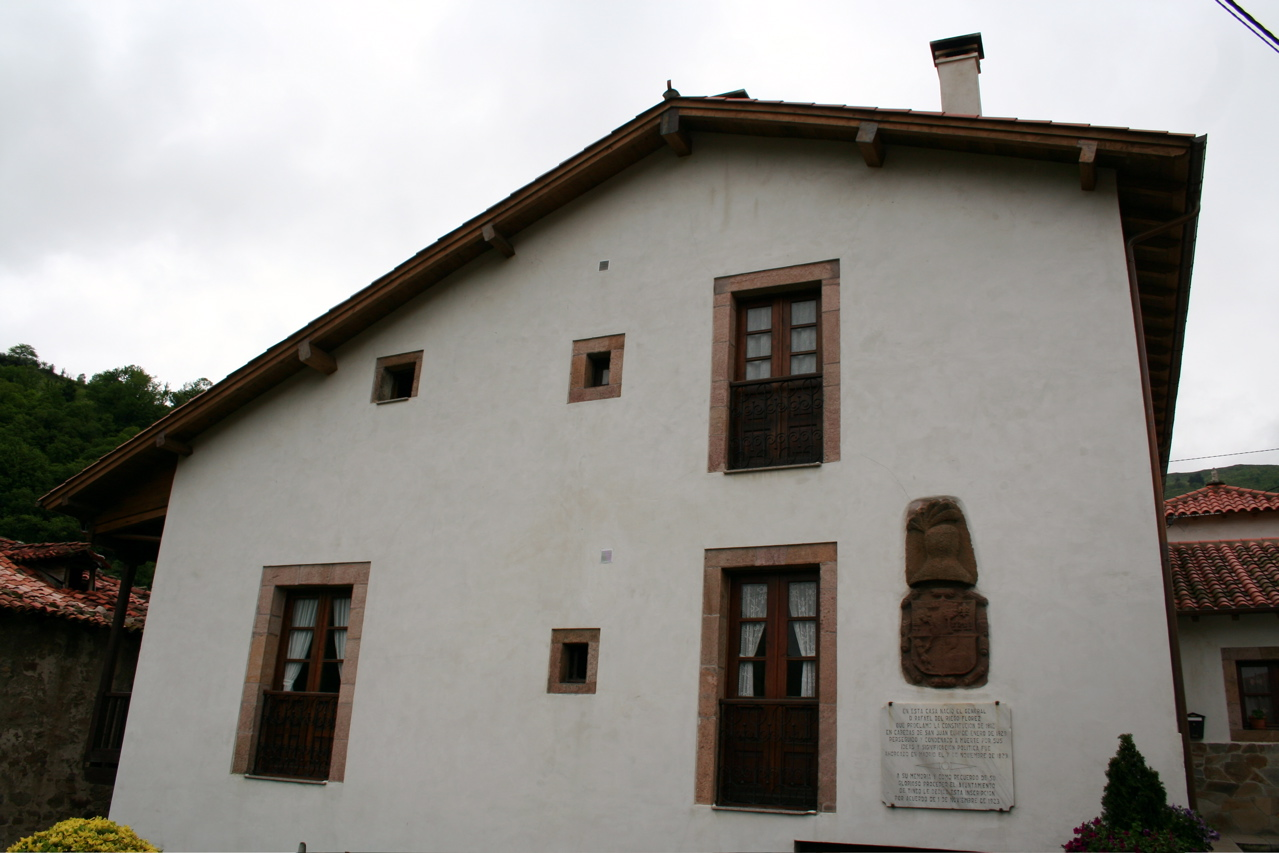
Building in Tuña

Tuña is one of 44 parishes (administrative divisions) in Tinéu, a municipality within the province and autonomous community of Asturias, in northern Spain.

== Villages and hamlets ==
- Bombiáu
- Cabanieḷḷas
- Castañéu
- Espinaréu
- La Pontecastru
- Tourayu
- Tuña

== Notable people ==
- Rafael del Riego (1784–1823), Spanish general and liberal politician, who played a key role in the outbreak of the Liberal Triennium, which briefly established a constitutional monarchy
