= Zardaín =

Coordinates: 43.383333°N 6.566667°W

Zardaín is one of 44 parishes in Tinéu, a municipality within the province and autonomous community of Asturias, in northern Spain.

It is 2.12 km^{2} (0.82 sq mi) in size, with a population of 56 in the 2025 census.

== Villages and hamlets ==
- Freisnéu
- Zardaín
