= Sacred Art Museum of Tineo =

Religious art museum in Tineo, Asturias, Spain

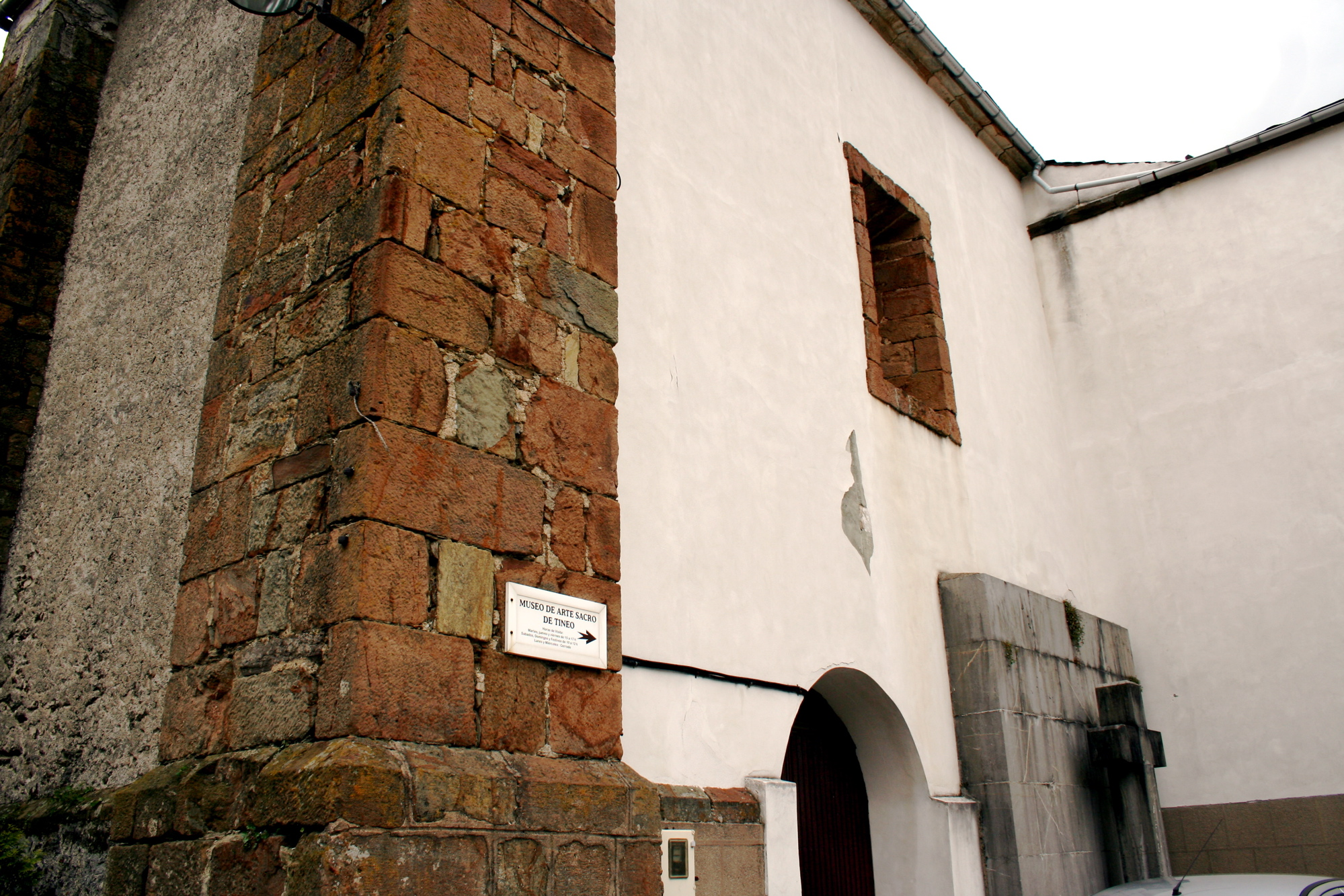
- Location: Plaza Alonso Martinez, 33870 Tineo, Asturias, Spain
- Director: Tomás García Cándido
- Public transit access: AS-217
- Website: http://www.museoartesacrotineo.es.vg/

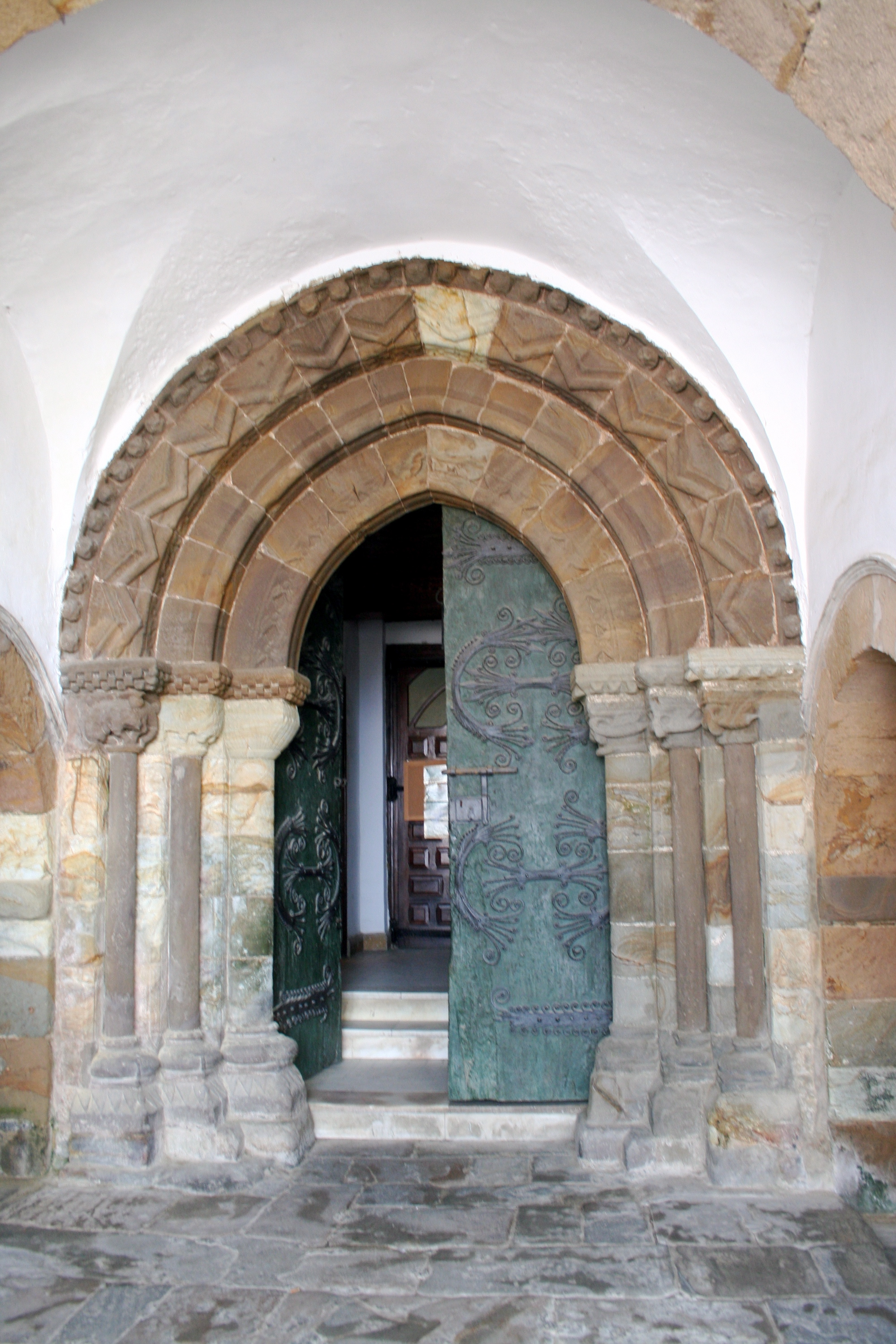
The door into the church is a gift from the museum.

Sacred Art Museum of Tineo (Spanish: Museo de Arte Sacro de Tineo) is a sacred art museum in Tineo, Asturias, Spain. The museum is located in a 14th-century Roman Catholic Church (known as the Convento de San Francisco del Monte because it formerly belonged to a Franciscan community), and is accessible via the AS-217 road.

It is promoted by a neighborhood association consisting of the museum's Promotion Committee and the Conde de Campomanes Cultural Association, amongst others. The museum's major sponsors include the Archdiocese of Oviedo and the Parrish of San Pedro de Tineo. The museum is open Tuesday, Thursday and Friday between 3:00 PM and 5:00 PM. On Saturdays, Sundays and holidays, it is open between 10 AM and noon. It is closed on Monday and Wednesday.

== Collection ==
Tomás García Cándido, a priest, oversees the collection of ecclesiastical objects. Goldsmith objects include chalices, patens, Mass glasses, candelabras, ciboria, and processional crosses. A medieval collection of wood carvings consists of 30 pieces from the 12th, 13th, 14th, and 15th centuries, plus 24 pieces from the 16th, 17th, and 18th centuries. Books dating to 1522 and Liturgical vestments round out the collection.
