= Mino (given name) =

Mino is a masculine given name and nickname which may refer to:

== Given name ==
- Mino da Fiesole (c. 1429–1484), also known as Mino di Giovanni, Italian sculptor
- Mino di Graziano (1289–1323), Italian painter
- Mino Argento (born 1927), Italian painter
- Mino Celsi (1514–c. 1576), Italian ambassador and scholar
- Mino Denti (born 1945), Italian retired road cyclist
- Mino De Rossi (1931–2022), Italian road bicycle and track cyclist
- Mino Doro (1903–1992), Italian film actor
- Mino Milani (1928–2022), Italian writer, cartoonist, journalist and historian

== Nickname ==
- Fermo Favini (1936–2019), Italian footballer
- Fermo Mino Martinazzoli (1931–2011), Italian lawyer and politician, Minister of Defence and Minister of Justice
- Carmine Mino Raiola (1967–2022), Italian football agent
