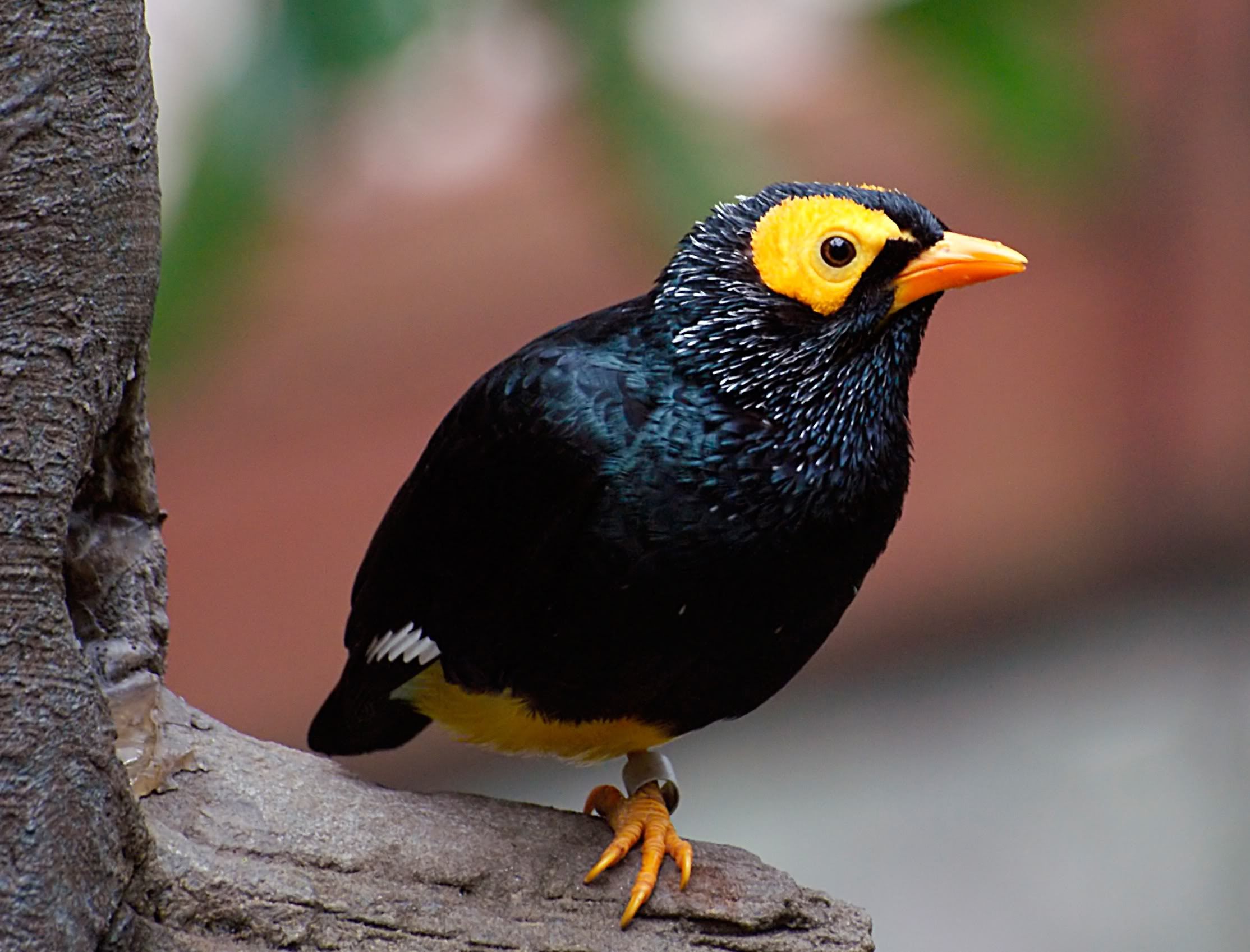
- Yellow-faced myna (Mino dumontii)

Scientific classification
- Kingdom: Animalia
- Phylum: Chordata
- Class: Aves
- Order: Passeriformes
- Family: Sturnidae
- Genus: Mino; Lesson, 1827

Type species
- Mino dumontii Lesson, 1827

Species
- M. dumontii M. anais M. kreffti

= Mino (bird) =

Genus of birds

Mino is a genus of mynas, birds in the starling family. These are the largest of the starlings and are found in tropical moist lowland forests in New Guinea and eastern neighboring islands.

== Taxonomy ==
The members of the genus are:

Image	Scientific name	Common name	Distribution
	Mino anais	Golden myna	New Guinea
	Mino dumontii	Yellow-faced myna	New Guinea
	Mino kreffti	Long-tailed myna	Bismarck Archipelago and northern Solomon Islands

The long-tailed myna was formerly considered a subspecies of the yellow-faced myna.
