= Miño (surname) =

Miño is a surname. Notable people with the surname include:

- Fidel Miño (born 1957), Paraguayan footballer
- Galo Miño (1953–1986), Ecuadorian sports shooter
- Juan Pablo Miño (born 1987), Argentine–born Chilean footballer
- Juan Sánchez Miño (born 1990), Argentine footballer
- Luis Miño (born 1989), Paraguayan footballer
- Marcelo Miño (born 1997), Argentine footballer
- Mariano Miño (born 1994), Argentine footballer
- Rosa Miño (born 1999), Paraguayan footballer
- Rubén Miño (born 1989), Spanish footballer

== See also ==
- Dolores de Miño (1903–1976), Paraguayan politician
