= Miñu (Tinéu) =

Coordinates: 43.4°N 6.516667°W

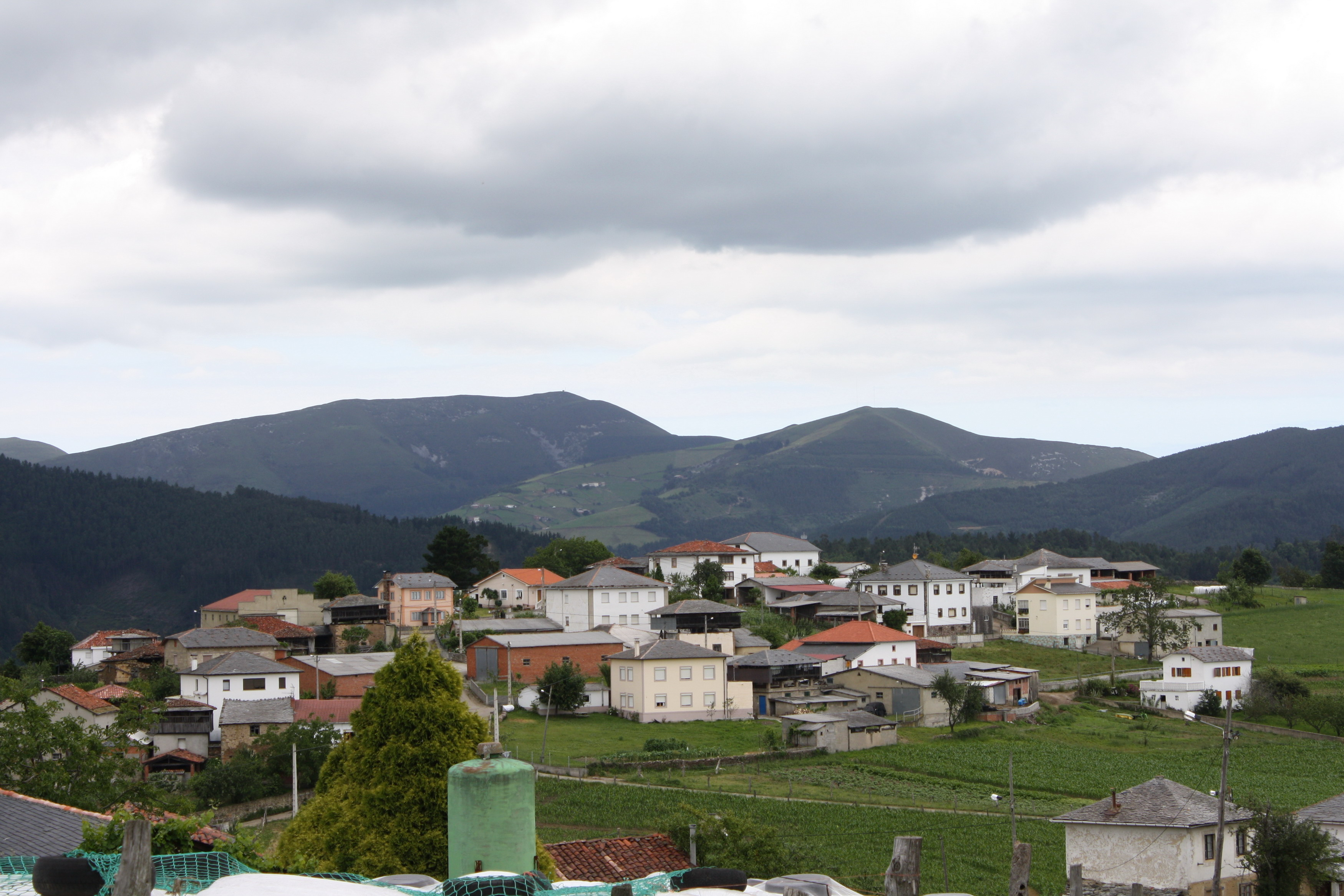
Miñu

Miñu (Spanish: Miño) is one of 44 parishes (administrative divisions) in Tinéu, a municipality within the province and autonomous community of Asturias, in northern Spain.

It has a population of 209.

== Villages and hamlets ==
- Bisḷḷavera
- La Fanar
- La Fouz
- Miñu
- Santolaya
- Tarantieḷḷos
- La Tiera
- Tremáu
- Trespandu
- Yerbu
- Zreicéu
