= Miño de Medinaceli =

- Municipality
- Location in Spain. Miño de Medinaceli (Spain)
- Coordinates: 41.167°N 2.517°W
- Country: Spain
- Autonomous community: Castile and León
- Province: Soria
- Municipality: Miño de Medinaceli

Area
  - Total: 56.25 km^{2} (21.72 sq mi)
- Elevation: 1,161 m (3,809 ft)

Population (2025-01-01)
  - Total: 73
  - Density: 1.3/km^{2} (3.4/sq mi)
- Time zone: UTC+1 (CET)
  - Summer (DST): UTC+2 (CEST)

Miño de Medinaceli is a municipality located in the province of Soria, Castile and León, Spain. According to the 2004 census (INE), the municipality had a population of 99 inhabitants and later in 2023 according to Provincial Council of Soria had population of 83 inhabitants.
