= Tinéu =

Tineo Tinéu (Asturian)
- Municipality
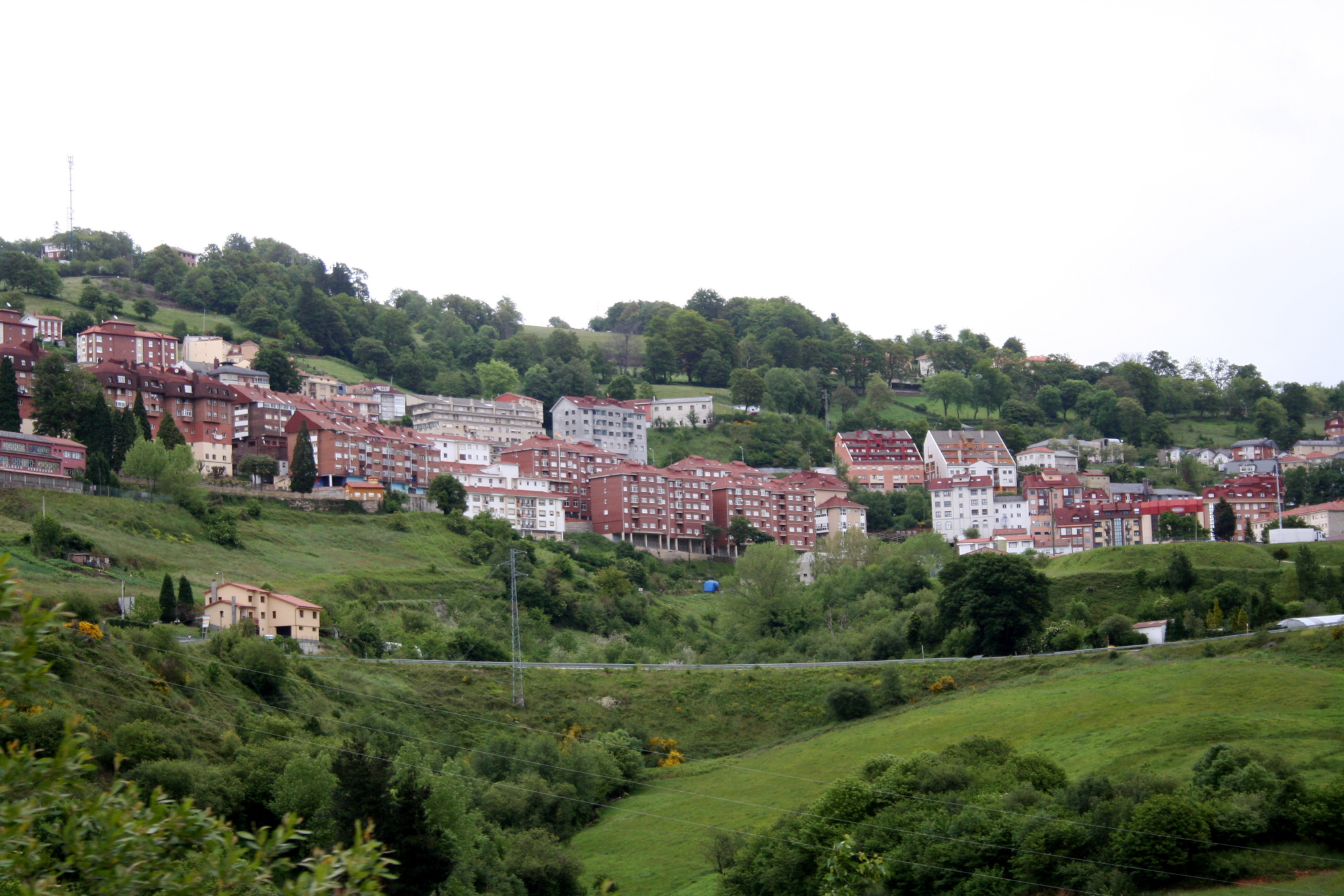
- View of Tinéu

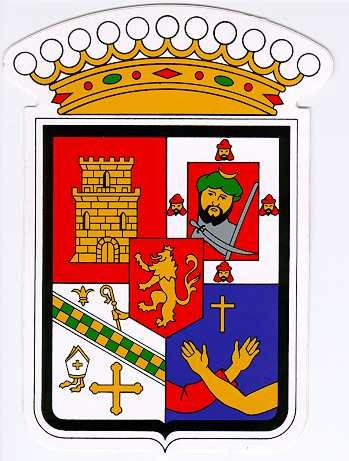
- Flag Coat of arms

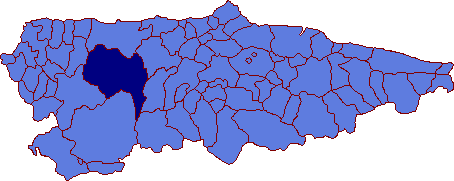
- The Municipality of Tinéu within Asturias

- Location of the town of Tinéu in Asturias Location of the town of Tinéu in Spain
- Coordinates: 43°20′N 6°25′W
- Country: Spain
- Autonomous community: Asturias
- Province: Asturias
- Comarca: Narcea
- Capital: Tinéu

Government
  - Alcalde (Since 2012): José Ramón Feito Lorences (PSOE)

Area
  - Total: 540.83 km^{2} (208.82 sq mi)
- Highest elevation: 1,532 m (5,026 ft)

Population (2025-01-01)
  - Total: 8,679
  - Density: 16.05/km^{2} (41.56/sq mi)
- Demonym: tinetense
- Time zone: UTC+1 (CET)
  - Summer (DST): UTC+2 (CEST)
- Postal code: 33870
- Website: www.tineo.es

Tineo is a concejo (municipality) in the Principality of Asturias, Spain. It is situated on a small tributary of the Narcea River. It is the second-largest municipality in Asturias. It is bordered to the north by Valdés, to the south by Cangas del Narcea, to the west by Villayón and Allande, and to the east by Salas, Miranda and Somiedo.

Mining, agriculture and stock-rearing have been the principal industries since the early 20th century.

== History ==
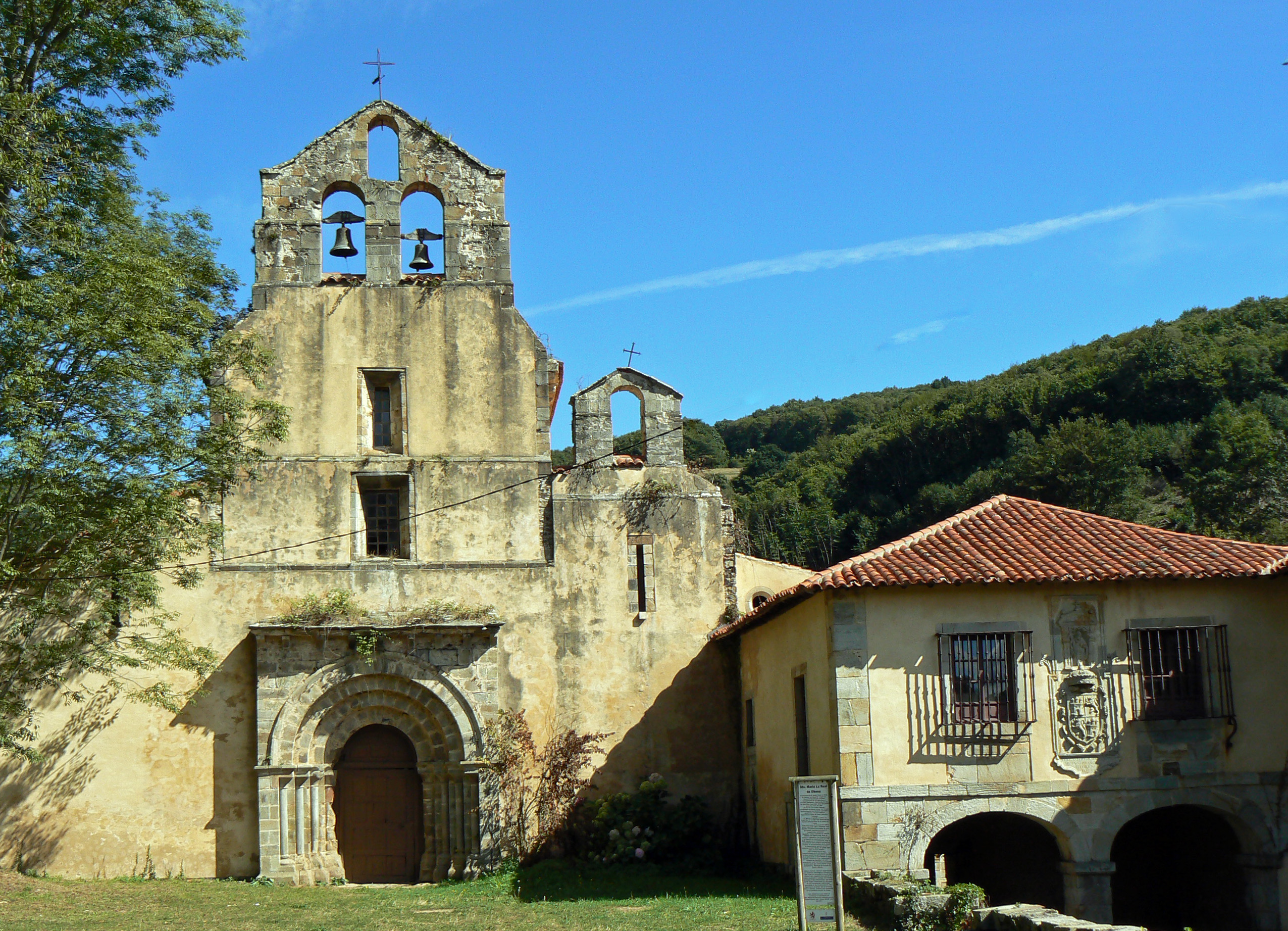
Santa María de Obona monastery

=== Coat of arms ===
Top left, Castle Tinéu
Top right, Coat of Arms from García de la Plaza, the local Heroe
Bottom left, Coat of Arms by the Cistercians Monastery in Castilla
Bottom right unten, Coat of Arms by the Franciscans in the Monastery of Tieno
middle, das Coat of Arms from the Count of Tineo

=== Way of St. James ===
The Way of St. James or Camino de Santiago named "The Northern Way" (Camino de la Costa) Camino Primitivo passes Luarca. There are also two Pilgrim Heritages:

- Albergue de Peregrinos «Mater Christi» - Marco Rodríguez, s/n - 33870 - Tineo (20 Beds)
- Albergue de Peregrinos «Tineo» - C/ Cabezas de San Juan - 33870 Tineo.

== Demography ==
Historical population
Year	1991	1996	2001	2004	2007
Pop.	14,927	13,578	12,598	12,312	11,539
±%	—	−9.0%	−7.2%	−2.3%	−6.3%

== Politics ==
	PSOE	PP	FAC	CDS	URAS	UCT	Others	Total
1979	1	1	5	–	–	7	7	21
1983	1	4	2	–	–	14	0	21
1987	6	3	3	–	–	5	0	17
1991	6	2	0	–	–	9	0	17
1995	4	4	–	–	–	9	0	17
1999	4	5	–	–	2	5	1	17
2003	6	7	–	–	0	3	1	17
2007	11	5	–	–	1	–	0	17
2011	12	4	1	–	–	–	–	17
Sources: Ministerio del Interior and Federación Asturiana de Concejos

== Parroquias (Parishes) ==
- Arganza
- Bárzana
- Bourres
- Brañaḷḷonga
- Bustieḷḷu
- Caeras
- Santiáu
- Cezures
- Coḷḷada
- Campucaldera
- El Pedregal
- El Rodical
- Fastias
- Francos
- Xinestaza
- Soutu
- La Preda
- Merías
- Santolaya de Miñu
- Muñalén
- Naraval
- Navelgas
- Nieres
- Oubona
- Santuyanu
- Porciles
- El Pozón
- San Esteban de Reḷḷamiegu
- Reḷḷanos
- San Fliz
- San Fagondu
- San Frichosu
- Samartín de Semproniana
- Sangoñéu
- Santolaya
- Santianes
- Sobráu
- Sorriba
- Tabláu
- Tinéu
- Troncéu
- Tuña
- Viḷḷatresmil
- Zardaín

== Tourism ==
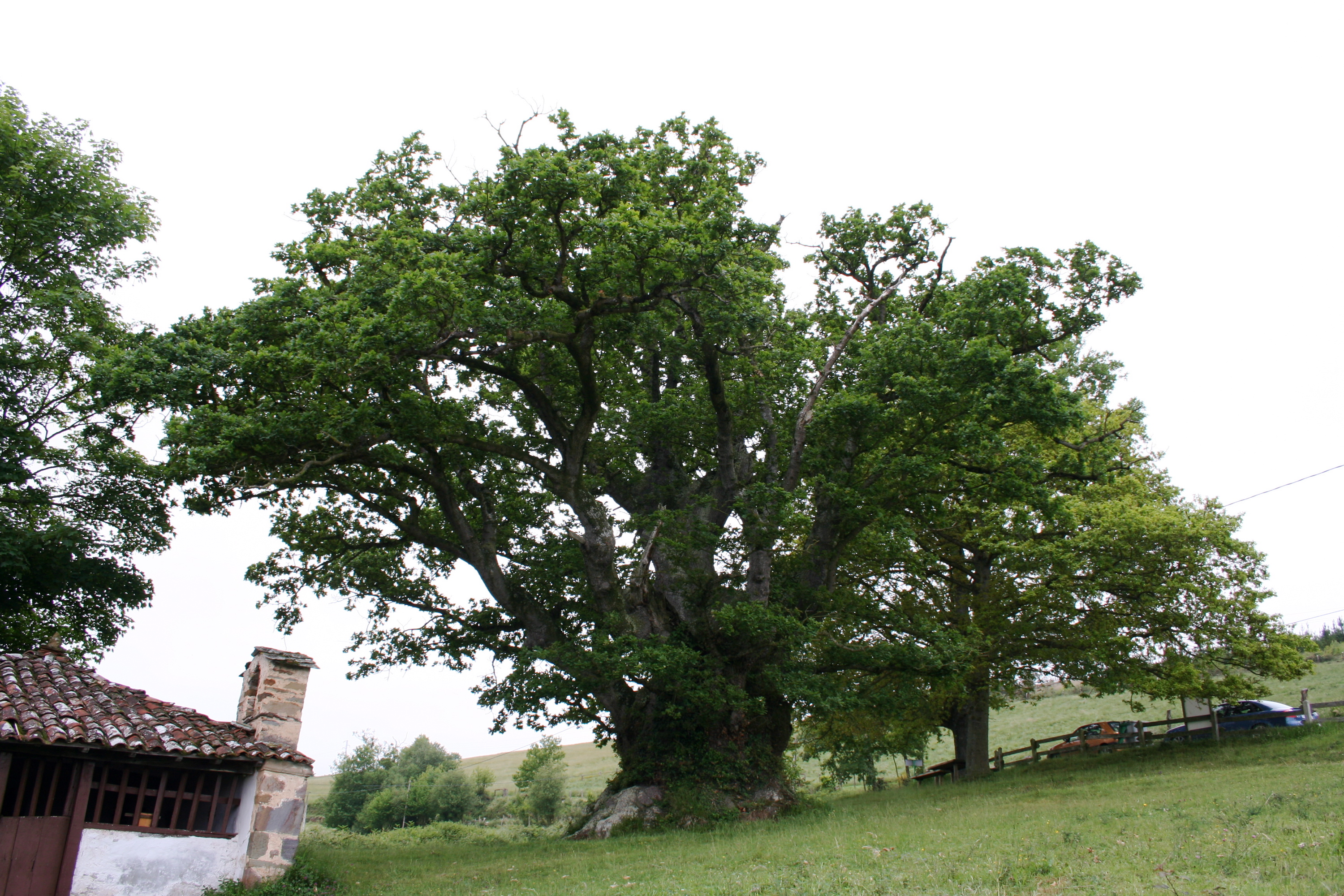
This oak has been declared a natural monument

The Sacred Art Museum of Tinéu is located at the Plaza Alonso Martinez inside the Convento de San Francisco del Monte ("Convent of San Francisco del Monte"), a 14th-century Roman Catholic church accessible via the AS-217 road.

== See also ==
- List of municipalities in Asturias
