= Abres =

Abres may refer to:

- Abres, Iran, a village in East Azerbaijan Province, Iran
- Abres (Vegadeo), a parish in Asturias, Spain
- San Tirso de Abres, a municipality in Asturias, Spain
- Abris, also known as Abres, an early Christian saint
