= Elisa Fernández de la Vega =

Spanish physician and professor (1895–1933)

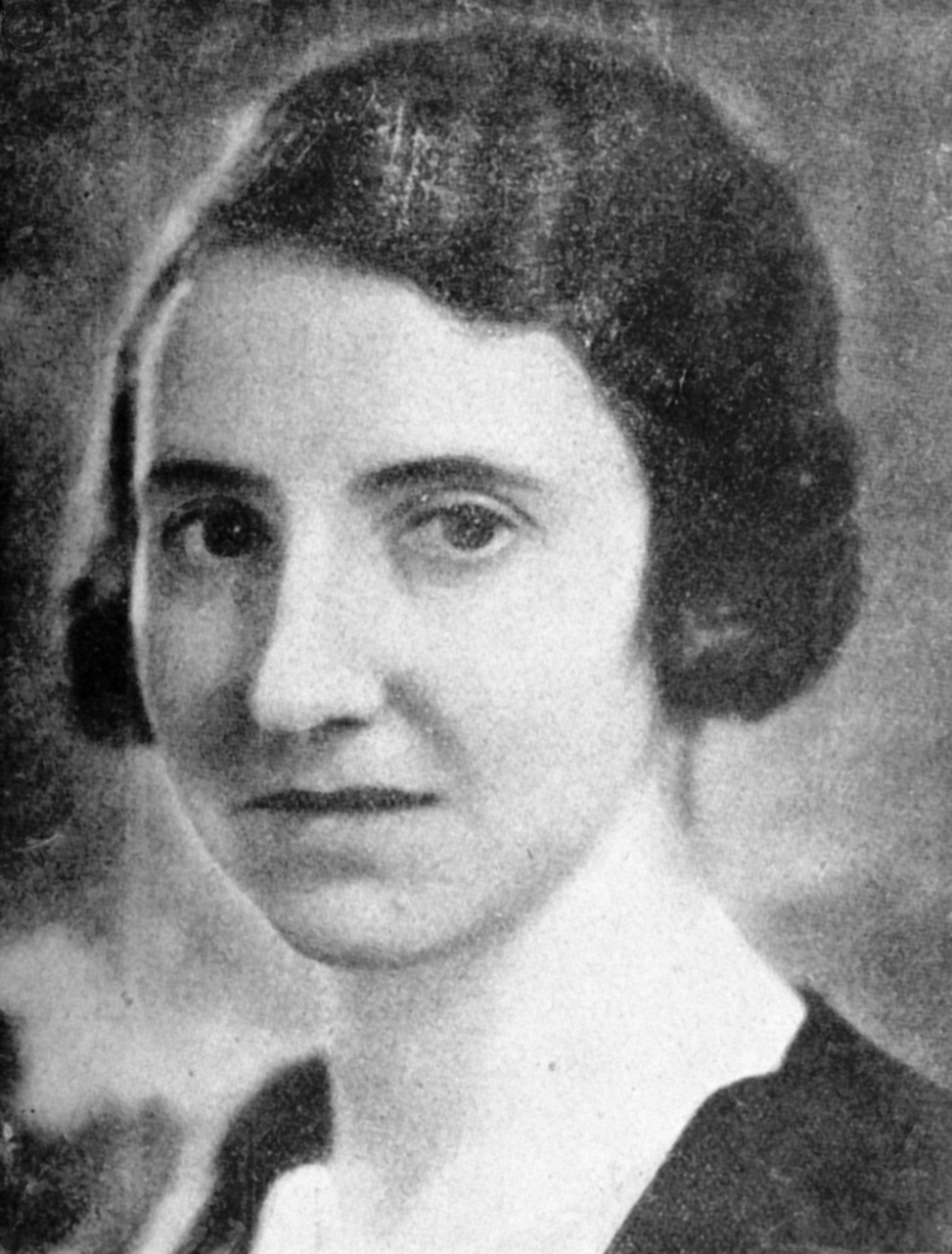
- Born: Elisa Fernanda María del Carmen Fernández de la Vega y Lombán; June 3, 1895; Vegadeo, Asturias, Spain
- Died: November 21, 1933 (aged 38); Zaragoza, Spain
- Education: University of Santiago de Compostela (B.A., M.D.)
- Occupations: Physician; Professor
- Spouse: Gumersindo Sánchez Guisande
- Relatives: Jimena Fernández de la Vega (twin sister); María Teresa Fernández de la Vega (niece)

Elisa Fernanda María del Carmen Fernández de la Vega y Lombán (3 June 1895 – 21 November 1933) was a Spanish physician and professor. She and her twin sister, Jimena Fernández de la Vega, were among the first women from Galicia to earn a degree in medicine. Elisa specialized in the treatment of respiratory diseases and aspired to become a professor at the University of Santiago. She died in 1933, at the age of 37, of a self-diagnosed atypical pneumonia.

== Early life and education ==
Elisa Fernández de la Vega was born in Vegadeo, Asturias, Spain, on june 3, 1895, together with her twin sister Jimena, to Wenceslao Fernández de la Vega Pasarín and Dolores Lombán. Her father was a physician, who practiced in Castroverde, Lugo. She and her twin sister, Jimena, were inseparable during their early years and shared a common academic path for a significant part of their lives.

Both sisters did their bachelor's degree at Instituto de Lugo between 1909 and 1913, taking all the subjects in non-official and non-collegiate education. In the following year, only three years after access to university education was granted to women in Spain, they began their medical studies at the Faculty of Medicine in University of Santiago de Compostela, where they worked with professor Roberto Nóvoa Santos.

Elisa and Jimena faced many hostilities from teachers and classmates and often were escorted through corridors by concerned classmates. In one instance, they were prohibited from attending anatomy classes a professor who considered it "inappropriate for a woman to see the body of a naked man." The sisters continued their education and, in 1919, became among the first women to earn a degree in Medicine.

Following her graduation, Elisa moved to Madrid for her doctoral studies. In 1921, she completed her doctoral thesis, titled Asma anafiláctico alimenticio y consideraciones acerca de la patogenia del asma en general (transl. Food-induced anaphylactic asthma and considerations regarding the pathogenesis of asthma in general) under the guidance of professor Teófilo Hernando. For their outstanding academic records, Elisa and Jimena were awarded the Grand Cross of the Order of Alfonso XII.

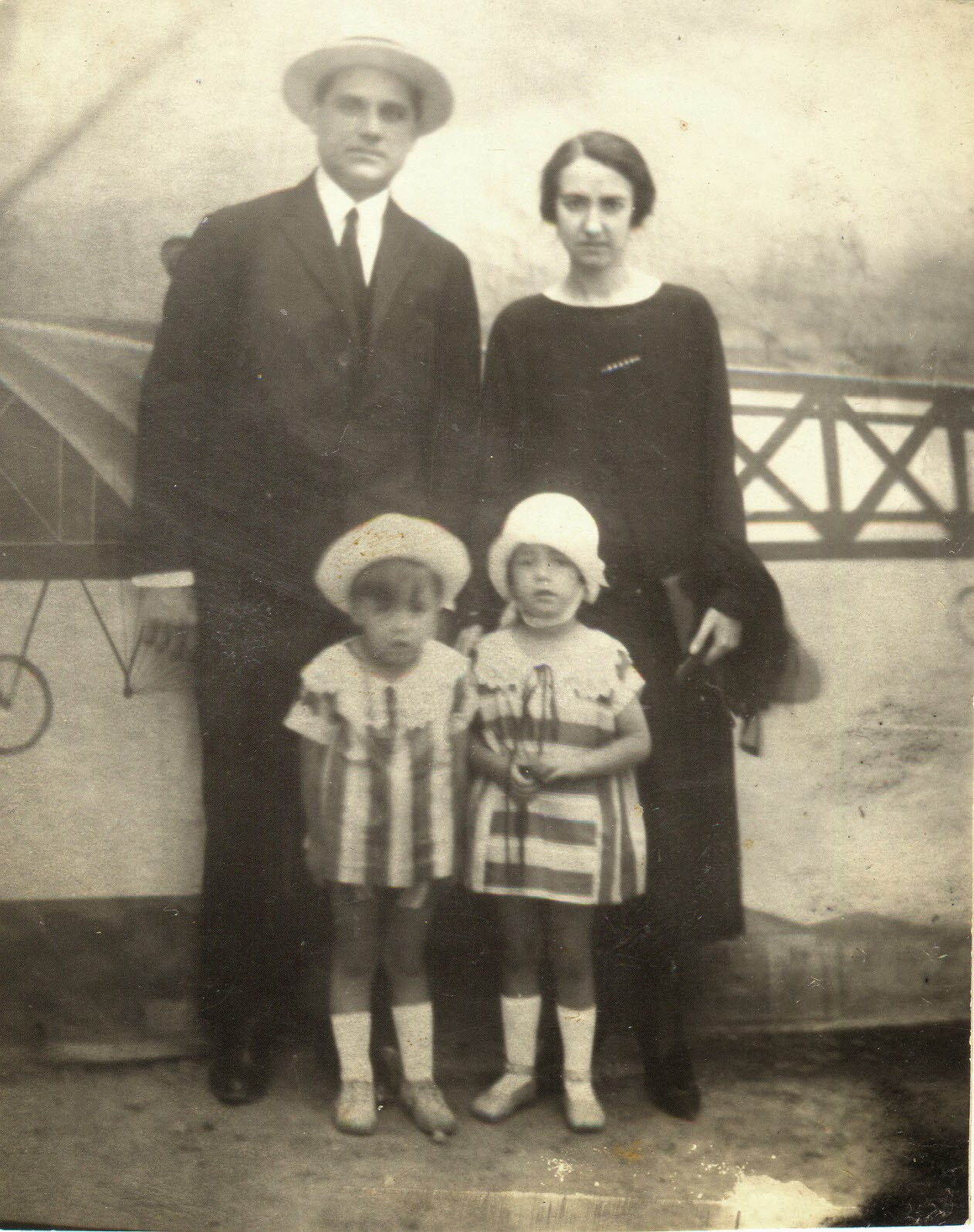
Elisa Fernández de la Vega with her husband, Gumersindo Sánchez, and two of their children.

Shortly after her graduation, Elisa married her former classmate Gumersindo Sánchez Guisande in 1925. She moved to Seville where her husband was professor of Anatomy and then to Zaragoza in 1928, where Sánchez Guisande held the chair of Descriptive Anatomy and Anatomical Technique and became dean of the Faculty of Medicine. She gave birth to three children, Luciano, Wenceslaus, and Elisa.

== Career ==
Fernández de la Vega further specialized in the field of pediatrics. She did her post-doctorate research with professor Enrique Suñer and published "Modificaciones que los preparados iodados determinan sobre la fórmula leucocitaria del niño" (transl. Modifications that iodinated preparations determine on the leukocyte formula of children.) In 1922, she was granted a one-year scholarship by JAE for further studies in Berlin. However, she did not use it for personal reasons and decided to stay in Madrid, where she worked at Hospital del Niño Jesús, under Dr. Santiago Cavengt, a prominent pediatrician.

Fernández de la Vega's career trajectory changed after 1925 after her marriage and move to Seville. However, she continued lecturing, writing, and publishing in various media, including in some cases under a pseudonym of Zoraida. From 1925 – 1930, she worked as an assistant professor of practical classes in Embryology. She also started practicing as a pediatrician after moving to Zaragoza in 1928.

Elisa had strong commitment to social welfare. She gave anti-war lectures, wrote manuals for nurses, and started a homeless shelter.

== Death and legacy ==
Fernández de la Vega died on November 21, 1933 in Zaragoza of pneumonia. Along with her sister Jimena, she overcame significant societal barriers to pursue higher education and a professional career in the early 20th century. In 2021, Jimena and Elisa Fernández de la Vega streets were named next to the Higher Technical School of Engineering in Spain.

== Selected works ==
- Fernández de la Vega, J.; Fernández de la Vega, E. (1916). "Somero estudio fisio-patológico del cerebelo" [Brief physio-pathological study of the cerebellum]. Galicia Médica (5, 7).
- Sañudo, V.; Fernández de la Vega, J.; Fernández de la Vega, E. (1916). "Trabajos de la Clínica y Laboratorio de Patología General" [Works of the Clinic and General Pathology Laboratory]. Galicia Médica (5, 7).
- Fernández de la Vega, E. (1921). Asma anafiláctico y consideraciones acerca de la patogenia del asma en general [Food-induced anaphylactic asthma and considerations on the pathogenesis of asthma in general] (Doctoral thesis). Madrid: Universidad Central.
- Fernández de la Vega, E. (1921). El poder antitúpsico del suero [The antituberculous power of serum]. Madrid.
- Fernández de la Vega, E. (1923). Modificaciones que los preparados iodados determinan sobre la fórmula leucocitaria del niño [Modifications that iodinated preparations induce on the leukocyte count in children]. Madrid: Universidad Central.

== See also ==
- Spanish Civil War
