= Jimena Fernández de la Vega =

Spanish physician and researcher

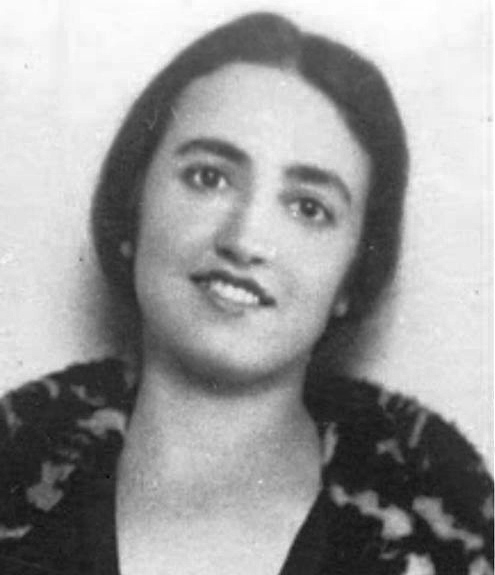
- Portrait of Jimena Fernández de la Vega
- Born: June 3, 1895; Vegadeo, Asturias, Spain
- Died: May 20, 1984 (aged 88); Santiago de Compostela, Galicia, Spain
- Education: University of Santiago de Compostela; Universidad Central de Madrid
- Known for: Medical genetics research; one of the first Galician woman to earn a medical degree
- Scientific career
- Fields: Medicine; Genetics; Medical hydrology (balneotherapy)
- Doctoral advisor: Gustavo Pittaluga

Jimena Fernández de la Vega y Lombán (June 3, 1895 – May 20, 1984) was a Spanish doctor, geneticist, professor, and one of the first Galician women to earn a medical degree. She specialized in medical genetics and worked closely with prominent Spanish scientists including Roberto Nóvoa Santos, Gustavo Pittaluga, and Gregorio Marañón. She was also the first director of the Genetics and Constitution Section at the University of Madrid's Faculty of Medicine, which served as a gateway for the development of genetics in Spanish medicine. Alongside her twin sister Elisa, she is remembered as a trailblazer for women in Spanish higher education and medicine. Fernández de la Vega spent her later years as medical director of various spas in Spain engaged in balneotherapy, a traditional medicine technique. She died in 1984 in Santiago de Compostela.

In recognition of her contributions and impact, she was recognized as the "Scientist of the Year 2021" by the Royal Galician Academy of Sciences. Her niece, María Teresa Fernández de la Vega, is a magistrate and known for being the first first female deputy prime minister of Spain.

== Early life and education ==
Jimena Fernández de la Vega was born on June 3, 1895 to Wenceslao Fernández de la Vega Pasarín and Dolores Lombán in Vegadeo, Asturias, Spain. Her father was a physician who practiced in Vegadeo as the medical director of the Guitiriz Spa since 1904. She and her twin sister Elisa Fernández de la Vega completed their secondary education at Instituto de Lugo between 1909 and 1913, taking all the subjects outside a state-accredited university system that did not confer a formal, state-recognized degree. (Note: Often referred as “non-official and non-collegiate education”. The "institutos" likely served as preparatory schools.) Fernández de la Vega obtained an outstanding grade in both literature and science in her final degree exam in 1913.

In the last year of their bachillerato (1912–13), the two sisters studied German and began the "Theoretical and Experimental Human Physiology" course at the Faculty of Medicine of the University of Santiago. After passing the preparatory course, they continued studying medicine under the guidance of professor Nóvoa Santos and published research articles on pathophysiological studies of the cerebellum in the journal Galicia Médica, titled "On the Presence of Fatty Granulations in the Blood" and "A Brief Physiopathological Study of the Cerebellum."

During their studies at the Faculty of Medicine of the University of Santiago de Compostela, Jimena and Elisa Fernández de la Vega encountered skepticism and hostility from both instructors and fellow students, who questioned the suitability of women pursuing medical careers. Until the Royal Order of 8 March 1910, women could not enroll in public university degrees—only in private faculties by special dispensation. In one reported incident, an anatomy professor at the University of Santiago de Compostela barred Jimena and Elisa Fernández de la Vega from his dissection theatre, deeming it inappropriate for women to view a naked male cadaver.

Despite these challenges, the sisters continued their education and in June 1919 became among the first women to earn medical degrees from a Galician university. In September 1919, both sisters took the competitive exams for the 'Extraordinary Prize', and Fernández de la Vega obtained one of the two prizes.

Following her graduation, Fernández de la Vega pursued further specialization. In 1922, she completed her doctoral thesis on the study of the infantile autonomic nervous system through hematological analysis, supervised by Spanish parasitologist and hematologist Gustavo Pittaluga. In recognition of her achievements, she was awarded the Grand Cross of Alfonso XII in 1922. A copy of her thesis is preserved in the National Library of Madrid.

Between 1923–1927, Fernández de la Vega undertook postgraduate studies in Germany, Austria, and Italy. She was one of fifty scientists awarded a research grant to study outside Spain by Junta para Ampliación de Estudios e Investigaciones Científicas(JAE), a research institution created in 1907 to promote scientific research and education in Spain. She was in Berlin for six months studying biometry with physicians Friedrich Kraus and Theodor Brugsh. Following the advice of Edwin Baur, she relocated to Hamburg to study genetics under Hermann Poll, a prominent German geneticist and eugenicist. She then spent a year with Poll learning standard Mendelian genetics techniques using Drosophila and carried out a study about pathology and inheritance of identical twins. Her final stop was Vienna, where she worked for six months with Julius Bauer studying the concepts of inheritance and predisposition. (Note: Also referred as "constitutional types" in references, an early 20th-century term in medicine and anthropology referring to the classification of individuals based on physical build, physiology, and hereditary traits.)

== Career ==
Fernández de la Vega's primary scientific interest lay in medical genetics with a focus on Mendelian inheritance and its clinical applications. She returned to Spain in 1927 and began experimental research about inheritance of blood groups and blood pathologies at the Central Laboratory of Clinical Research of the Faculty of Medicine of Madrid, directed by the haematologist Gustavo Pittaluga. She began translating the works of Baur and other German physiologists, with the aim of publishing the knowledge acquired in Germany and Austria within the Spanish academic community. From 1928 to 1929, she published articles in the Archives of the Medical Service of Pathology (Hospital General de Madrid), in the Archives of Cardiology and Hematology (periodical publication of the Laboratorio Central de Investigación Clínicas and public consultation of diseases of the blood of the Faculty of Medicine of Madrid) and in the Archives of Neurobiologia. In 1930, she published her translation of the second edition of Julius Bauer's Konstitutions und Vererbungdslehre (Constitution and Heredity) from 1923.

In 1930, European researchers Hermann Poll and Julius Baur visited Madrid as guests for several conferences. Poll suggested to physiologist Augusto Pi Suñer, then a member of the Council of Culture of the Ministry of Public Instruction, to create a specialized laboratory in Spain for the study of human genetics. Subsequently, Gregorio Marañón created the Sección de Genética y Constitución (Genetics and Constitution Section) at the Faculty of Medicine of the University of Madrid in 1933, as part of the pathology chair of the School of Medicine led by Roberto Nóvoa Santos. Fernández de la Vega was named the director of the laboratory. Her research during this period focused on heredity and its relation to medical conditions, and she became a collaborator of Gregorio Marañón, a leading figure in Spanish endocrinology and medicine, as well as one of the pioneers of Spanish eugenics. In the same year, she also participated in the first Spanish eugenics conference, held in Madrid from 21 April to 10 May 1933, and gave a course entitled Biological inheritance in man, dealing with Mendelian transmission of psychological characters.

=== Research in Italy and Germany ===
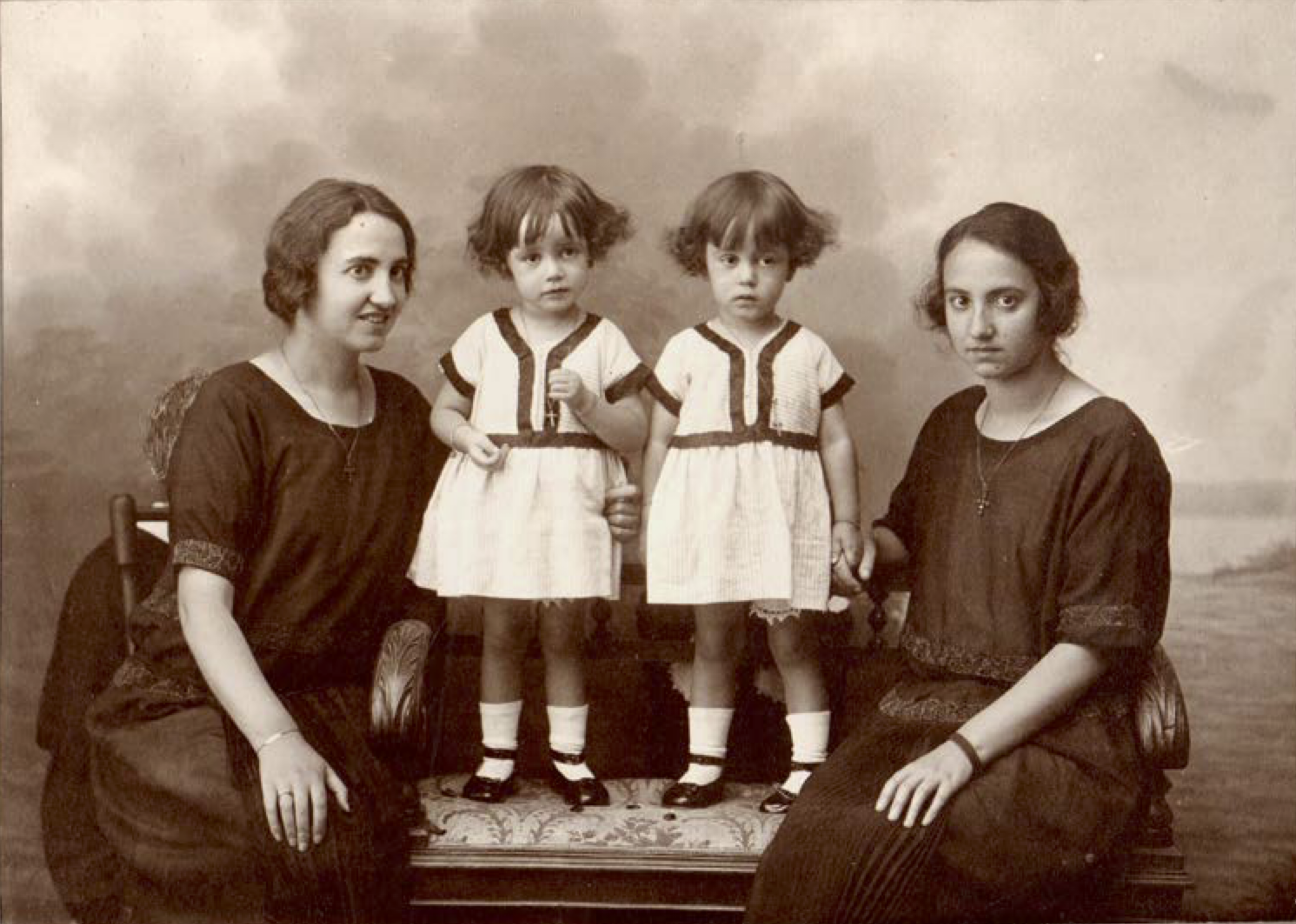
Jimena and Elisa with twin nieces Lola and Amalia

After being named the director of the Genetics and Constitution Section, Fernández de la Vega received another research grant from the JAE in 1933 to develop her genetics research in Italy and Germany. The scholarship was granted for one year, with one semester spent in Italy and three months in Germany. She stayed in Genoa from October 1933 until April 1, 1934, at the Istituto di Clinica Medica, where in the opinion of her director, Nicola Pende, Jimena proved to have "perfect preparation for scientific research and great clinical knowledge."

Fernández de la Vega then moved to Berlin to continue her scholarship at the Keiser Wilhelm Institut, where she conducted research on the inheritance of the blood forms and differences in form of human red blood cells, using the twin method. Her scholarship, due to end in June 1934, was extended until October by the institute director Eugen Fischer to continue her work.

=== Return to Spain and Spanish Civil War ===
The academic landscape in Spain changed significantly during late 1930s. After the death of Nóvoa Santos in 1933, the section of Genetics and Constitution was reduced from experimental work laboratory to a theoretical seminar, due to lack of support for experimental genetics research. However, she continued serving as the director until her retirement in 1966.

In 1935, Gregorio Marañón invited her to teach a genetics course, leading to the publication of La herencia fisiopatológica en la especie humana (Pathological Inheritance in the Human Species) in 1935, the first Spanish text about human genetics written by a physician, which included a prologue by Marañón.

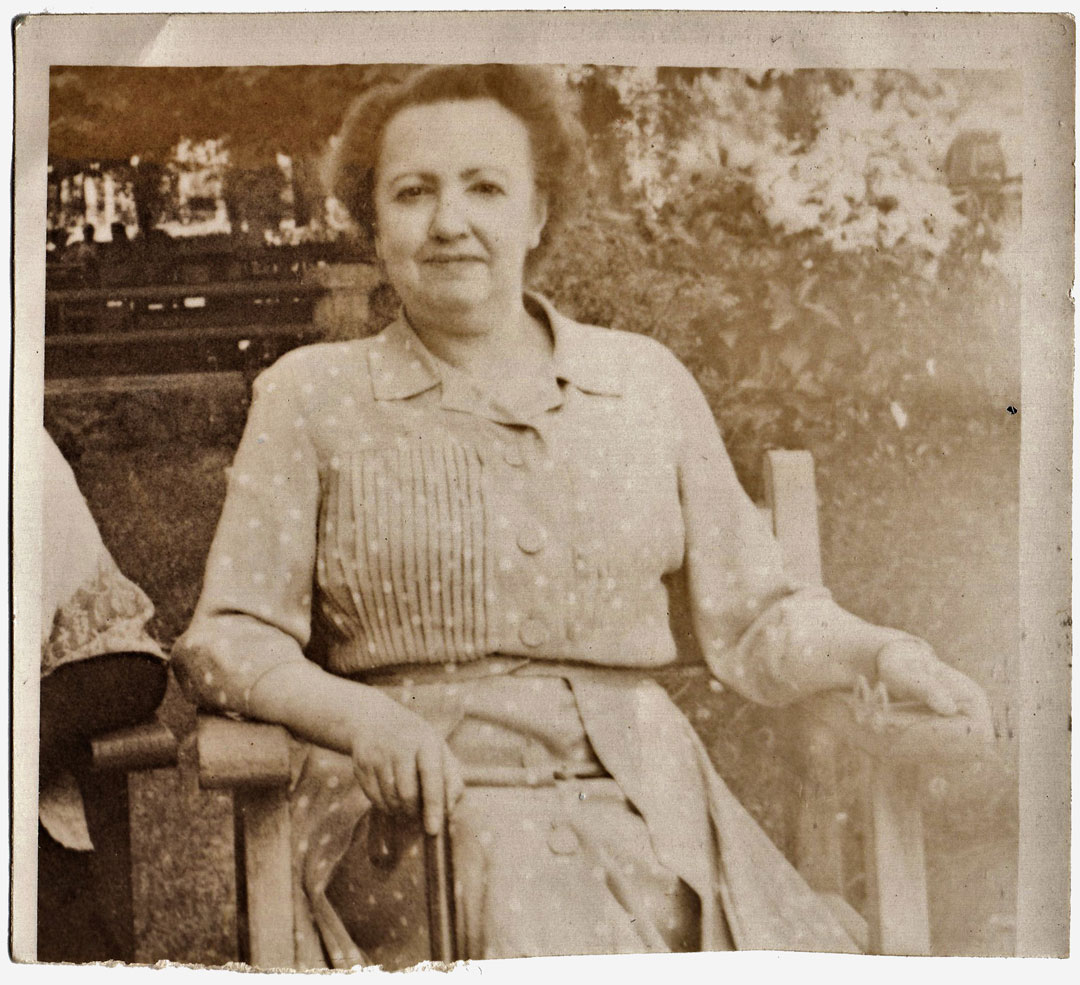
Jimena Fernández de la Vega in 1953 in Guitiriz

After the start of Spanish Civil War in 1936, Fernández de la Vega moved to Santiago and worked at the San Caetano Hospital as a field doctor, overseeing the care of wounded individuals. She also took responsibility of raising her sister Elisa's children after Elisa died in 1933 and Elisa's husband moved to Argentina. She returned to Madrid after the end of the war to continue teaching and worked at the old hospital of San Carlos, in Atocha.

=== Later career ===
Fernández de la Vega's later career was oriented towards medical hydrology. In 1945, she took the competitive exams to become a medical hydrologist, a balneologist. She moved to Santiago de Compostela where she focused on the study of water-based therapy, a traditional medicine technique practiced at spas. She became medical director at the Guitiriz spa, of which her father had already been director, and worked until 1957. At the International Congress of Gastroenterology held in Madrid, she presented "Eficacia de las aguas de Guitiriz (Lugo, España) en el tratamiento de las colecistopatías," detailing efficacy of waters of Guitiriz in medical treatments. She published several other works in medical hydrology, before her final publication on genetics, Theory of Heredity and Molecular Inheritance in 1963. Over the next few decades, she managed the medical services for several spas such as Montemayor (Cáceres) and Lanjarón (Granada), applying her knowledge of balneotherapy and medicine, until her retirement. She spent her final years in Santiago de Compostela and died on May 20, 1984. She is buried in the Boisaca cemetery.

== Legacy ==
Jimena Fernández de la Vega is remembered as a trailblazer for women in Spanish science and medicine. Along with her sister Elisa, she is known for overcoming societal barriers for women to pursue higher education and a professional career in the early 20th century. The Royal Galician Academy of Sciences honored her as the Scientist of the Year 2021 "to make known her figure as an example of a woman scientist, in times when it was not easy to be admitted and recognized".

In 2020, a cultivar of Camellia japonica was named for Jimena Fernández de la Vega by the Provincial Deputation of Pontevedra, followed in 2021 by the designation of streets nearby Higher Technical School of Engineering in Spain in her and her sister Elisa's names. María Teresa Fernández de la Vega, Spain's first female deputy prime minister, is the niece of Fernández de la Vega. In a video tribute to the de la Vega sisters, she spoke of their courage and its influence on her own path.

== Selected works ==
- Fernández de la Vega, J. (1916). "Somero estudio fisio-patológico del cerebelo" [A Brief Physiopathological Study of the Cerebellum]. Galicia Médica (in Spanish). 12: 51–56.
- Fernández de la Vega, J. (1918). "Sobre la presencia de granulaciones grasientas en la sangre" [On the Presence of Fatty Granulations in the Blood]. Galicia Médica (in Spanish). 12: 45–50.
- Fernández de la Vega, J. (1922). Estudio de la vagotonía infantil por medio del examen hematológico [Study of Infant Autonomic Nervous System via Hematological Examination] (Doctoral thesis) (in Spanish). Universidad Central de Madrid.
- Fernández de la Vega, J. (1928). "Experimentos de genética en Drosophila, efectuados en el Instituto Anatómico de Hamburgo" [Experiments in Drosophila Genetics Conducted at the Anatomical Institute of Hamburg]. Boletín de la Real Sociedad Española de Historia Natural (in Spanish): 237–242.
- Fernández de la Vega, J. (1928–1929). "Consideraciones sobre las hemodistrofias: a propósito de un caso" [Considerations on Hemodystrophies: Concerning a Case]. Anales del Servicio de Patología Médica del Hospital General de Madrid (in Spanish). 10: 224–231.
- Fernández de la Vega, J. (1929). "Consideraciones etiológicas y patogénicas sobre un caso de hemofilia" [Etiological and Pathogenic Considerations on a Case of Hemophilia]. Archivos de Cardiología y Hematología (in Spanish). 10: 185–190.
- Fernández de la Vega, J. (1930a). "Contribución a la solución del problema de la herencia de los grupos sanguíneos" [Contribution to Resolving the Problem of Blood Group Inheritance]. Archivos de Cardiología y Hematología (in Spanish). 9: 295–313.
- Fernández de la Vega, J. (1930b). "Grupos sanguíneos" [Blood Groups]. Archivos de Cardiología y Hematología (in Spanish). 11: 300–302.
- Fernández de la Vega, J. (1933). "Herencia de los caracteres psicológicos" [Inheritance of Psychological Traits]. Archivos de Neurobiología (in Spanish). 13: 405–417.
- Fernández de la Vega Lombán, Jimena F. de la (1946). Hidrología y materia biológica: lecciones adaptadas al programa de oposiciones a médicos hidrólogos [Medical Hydrology and Biological Matter: Lectures Adapted to the Examination Syllabus for Hydrologist Physicians]. Lecciones para médicos hidrólogos (in Spanish). Madrid: Imprenta Juan Bravo.
- Fernández de la Vega, J. (1963). Teoría de la herencia y herencia molecular [Theory of Inheritance and Molecular Heredity] (in Spanish). Madrid: Paz Montalvo. p. 152.
