= Galician–Asturian =

Romance dialects in a Galician/Portuguese–Asturian continuum

- Eonavian
- gallego-asturiano, eonaviego, fala
- Pronunciation: [ɡaˌʎeɣw astuˈɾjanʊ] [eonaˈβjɛɣʊ]
- Native to: Spain
- Region: Asturias
- Native speakers: 45,000 (2002) (Note: According to a Sociolinguistic II of Asturias (2002) study, sponsored by the Academy of the Asturian Language, performed by 'Euskobarómetro', of the respondents, 72% said they spoke the language, but 24% claimed to be able to read, and 16% to be able to write it. The study did not include speakers who lived outside Eo-navia.)
- Language family: Indo-European: Italic; Latino-Faliscan; Latin; Romance; Italo-Western; Western; Ibero-Romance; West Iberian; Galician-Portuguese; Galician–Asturian
- Early forms: Proto-Indo-European: Proto-Italic; Proto-Latino-Faliscan; Old Latin; Vulgar Latin; Proto-Romance; Galician-Portuguese
- Writing system: Latin (Asturian alphabet)

Official status
- Recognised minority language in: Asturias
- Regulated by: Academia de la Llingua Asturiana

Language codes
- ISO 639-3: –
- Glottolog: None
- Linguasphere: 51-AAA-cae
- IETF: gl-u-sd-esas
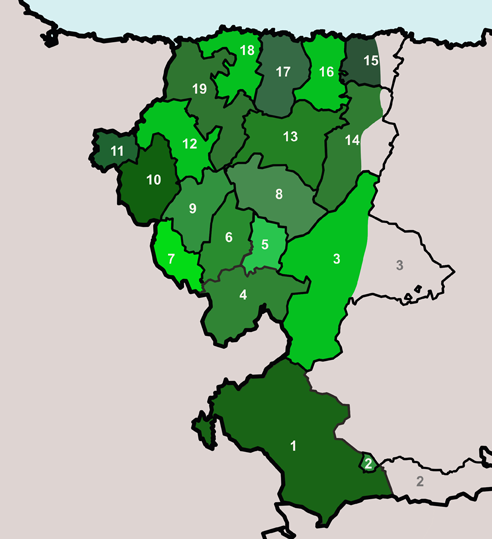
- Linguistic area of Eonavian

Galician–Asturian, (Note: The name used in Act 1/1998 of the Principality of Asturias) also known as Eonavian or Eonaviego, (autonym: fala; Asturian: eonaviegu, gallego-asturianu; Galician: eonaviego, galego-asturiano) is a set of Romance dialects or falas whose linguistic dominion extends into the zone of Asturias between the Eo River and Navia River (or more specifically the Eo and the Frejulfe River). The dialects have been variously classified as the northeastern varieties of Galician, as a linguistic group of its own, or as a dialect of transition between Galician and Asturian, an opinion upheld by José Luis García Arias, the former president of the Academy of the Asturian Language (ALLA).

The set of dialects was traditionally included by linguists as Galician-Portuguese or Galician, with some traits of the neighbouring Astur-Leonese linguistic group. (Note: That was the opinion of such linguists as Menéndez Pidal, Eugenio Coseriu, Luís Lindley Cintra, Dámaso Alonso, and more recent ones such as Francisco Xavier Frías Conde and Xoán Babarro.) Now, however, there is a political-linguistic conflict on the identity of the language between those who prioritise the mixed identity and those that continue to prioritise the Galician substratum. Supporters of the former, mostly in Asturias, identify Eonavian as part of a dialect continuum between the Asturian and Galician languages or even a third language belonging to Portuguese-Galician group spoken only in that area. (Note: e.g., Ruth González Rodríguez, Ricardo Saavedra Fernández-Combarro, and Xoxé Miguel Suárez. See the points of view of Suárez Fernández and Ruth González and Ricardo Saavedra) Supporters of the latter, mostly in Galicia, identify it as just Galician and want for it the same level of protection as Galician has in Castile and Leon, which protects the dialects of El Bierzo (of which the westernmost varieties are usually classified as Galician) in cooperation with the Galician government. Recently, the director of an exhaustive study by the University of Oviedo (ETLEN, a Linguistic Atlas of the Boundary between Galician-Portuguese and Asturleonese in Asturias) concluded that both proposals are true and compatible: that is, local varieties belong to the Galician-Portuguese domain and are part of the transitional varieties between this domain and Astur-Leonese.

== Nomenclature ==
Terms used to refer to the language include gallego–asturiano, the name used in Act 1/1998 of the Principality of Asturias, meaning "Galician–Asturian language"; a fala ("the speech", not to be confused with the Fala language of Extremadura); and Galego de Asturias ("Galician language of Asturias"). The term Eonaviego was first used by the linguist Xavier Frías Conde, who translated it as Eonavian in English, Éonavien in French, and Eonavienc in Catalan. In 2007, the Academy of the Asturian Language accepted the term Eonavian to refer to the dialect.

== Classification ==
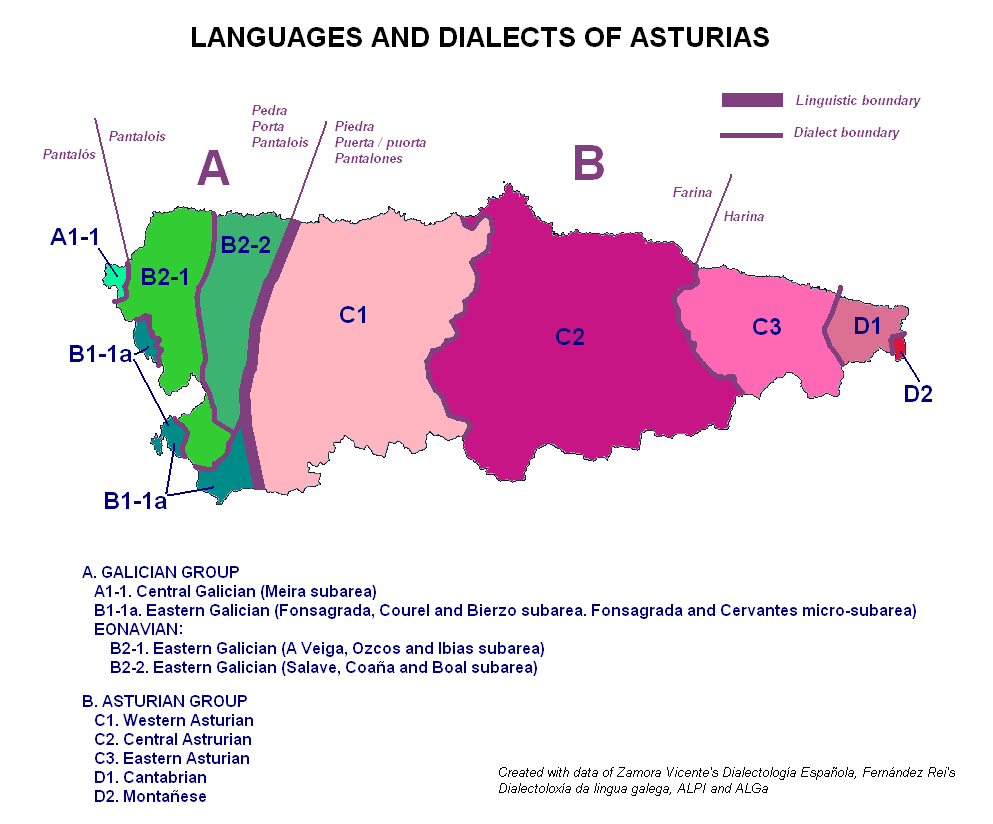
Linguistic areas of Asturias, attending only to scientific criteria. In green, Asturogalician languages and in purple, Asturoleonese languages

From a philological point of view, the origin of the language is surely in the Galician-Portuguese language family, the dominant language in the northwest of the Iberian peninsula in the Middle Ages. That follows from an examination of the more than six hundred parchments preserved in the Monastery of Santa María de Villanueva de Oscos. The examination of these documents allows us to recognise one of the most genuine examples of the medieval Galician-Portuguese language and many of its documents are cited as the earliest written samples of this language.

For the early stage, there are only documented translations of copies of ancient Latin deeds that were beginning to be unintelligible to the common people, (v. AHN sec. clergy, carp. 1617, AHN, Sec Clergy, carp. No. 1617. 15, no. 2, Sec AHN clergy carp. 1621 No 15 etc.), and there would not be until the mid-13th century that the first original deeds were written in the Galician-Portuguese language. In the early 14th century, the oddness of this language with the rest of the galacoifonía, was noticed. The most of these developments were the result of the Castilian language advancement in the urban centres of the River Eo: Revoredo, Ribadeo and Castropol, such influence was more significant in the writings of the bishops' notaries of Oviedo in these villages, but if the influence of Castilian was growing in the urban centres, the manuscripts of the monastery notaries still kept the original features of this language, and others were added that then appeared.

Since 1865, when Aureliano Fernández Guerra y Orbe published the first texts of the monastery of Oscos, the enormous divergences with the rest of the Asturian cartularies and specifically with the Fuero de Avilés, of which many of these texts are contemporary, became evident. In this sense, Rafael Lapesa, when dealing with the evolution of "Western Asturian" during the High Middle Ages, expressly excluded from his study the region to the west of the river Navia because he considered that it did not present any speciality in relation to other Galician-Portuguese cartularies. Many subsequent studies have dealt with the specific features of the Galician-Portuguese languages found in this cartulary, particularly the conjugated infinitive or articles system.

The cartulary of Oscos is an essential landmark for understanding the evolution of the Galician-Portuguese language, but the monastery's influence was ended with the arrival of the Castilian congregation in 1511. That started another period of great economic and social growth of the monastery around the iron industries, but the installation of the reformed order ended the written language, until its re-emergence in the late 19th century.

== Distribution ==
The area where the dialects are spoken includes the Asturian municipalities of Boal, Castropol, Coaña, Eilao, El Franco, Grandas de Salime, Pezós, San Martín de Ozcos, Santalla de Ozcos, Santiso de Abres, Tapia de Casariego, Taramundi, A Veiga, Vilanova de Ozcos, and partially those of Navia, Ibias, Villayón, and Allande; as well as the Galician municipality of Negueira de Muñiz.

== Comparative table ==
Latin	Galician			Galician-asturian	Galician- portuguese	Portuguese	Western Asturian	Spanish	English
Latin	Western	Central	Eastern (Ancares)	Galician-asturian	Galician- portuguese	Portuguese	Western Asturian	Spanish	English
animales	animais [äniˈmäs]	animás [äniˈmäs]	animáis [äniˈmɑi̯s]	animales [änɪˈmäles] ant. [änɪˈmɑi̯s]	animaes	animais [ɐniˈmäjʃ]	animales [äniˈmäle̞s]	animales [äniˈmäle̞s]	animals
audire	oír/ouvir [o̞ˈir]/[o̞wˈbir]	oír/ouvir [o̞ˈir]/[o̞wˈbir]	oír/ouvir [o̞ˈir]/[o̞wˈbir]	ouguir [o̞wˈɣir]	oir/ ouvir/ouguir	ouvir [o(w)ˈviɾ]	ouyer [o̞wˈje̞r]	oír [o̞ˈir]	hear
canes	cans [ˈkãŋs]	cas [ˈkäs]	cais [ˈkɑi̯s]	cais [ˈkæi̯s]/[ˈkɑi̯s]	cães/ cããs	cães [ˈkɐ̃j̃ʃ]	canes [ˈkäne̞s]	canes [ˈkäne̞s] (perros)	dogs
caballus	cabalo [käˈbälo̞]	cabalo [käˈbälo̞]	cabalo [käˈbälo̞]	cabalo/caballo [käˈbälo̞]/[käˈbäʎo̞] *	cavalo	cavalo [kɐˈväɫu]	caballu [käˈbäʎu]	caballo [käˈbäʎo̞]	horse
infantam /puellam	nena [ˈnenä]	nena [ˈnenä]	nena [ˈnenä]	nía [ˈniä]	ninna	menina [mɨˈninɐ]	neña [ˈne̞ɲä]	niña [ˈniɲä]	girl
latrones	ladróns [läˈðroŋs]	ladrós [läˈðros]	ladróis [läˈðroɪ̯s]	ladróis/lladróis [läˈðroi̯s]/[ʎäˈðroi̯s] *	ladrões	ladrões [ɫɐˈdɾõj̃ʃ]	ỊỊadrones [ʈʂäˈðro̞nis]	ladrones [läˈðro̞ne̞s]	thieves
germanum	irmán [irˈmãŋ]	irmao [irˈmao̞]	irmao [irˈmao̞]	ermao [ɪrˈmãw]	irmão	irmão [iɾˈmɐ̃w̃]	hermanu [erˈmänu]	hermano [erˈmäno̞]	brother
lux	luz [ˈlus]	luz [ˈluθ]	luz [ˈluθ]	luz/lluz [ˈluθ]/[ˈʎuθ] *	luz/lus	luz [ˈɫuʃ]	ỊỊuz [ˈʈʂuθ]	luz [ˈluθ]	light
longe	lonxe [ˈlonʃe]	lonxe [ˈlonʃe]	lonxe [ˈlɔnʃe]	lonxe/llonxe [ˈlɔnʃe]/ [ˈʎɔnʃe] *	longe	longe [ˈɫõʒɨ]	ỊỊo̞ñe [ˈʈʂo̞ɲi]	lueñe [ˈlweɲe] (lejos)	far
quinque	cinco [ˈsiŋko̞]	cinco [ˈθiŋko̞]	cinco [ˈθiŋko̞]	cinco [ˈθiŋko̞]	cinco	cinco [ˈsĩku]	cincu [ˈθiŋku]	cinco [ˈθiŋko̞]	five
oculum	ollo [ˈoʎo̞]/[ˈɔʝo̞]	ollo [ˈoʎo̞]/[ˈɔʝo̞]	ollo [ˈɔʎo̞]	oyo [ˈɔʝo̞]	ollo	olho [ˈoʎu]	güeyu/güechu [ˈweʝu]/[ˈwetʃu]	ojo [ˈo̞xo̞]	eye
horam	hora [ˈɔɾä]	hora [ˈɔɾä]/[ˈoɾä]	hora [ˈoɾä]	hora [ˈoɾä]	hora	hora [ˈɔɾɐ]	hora [ˈo̞ɾä]	hora [ˈo̞ɾä]	hour
hominem	home [ˈome̞]	home [ˈɔme̞]	home [ˈɔme̞]	home [ˈɔme̞]	home	homem [ˈɔmɐ̃j̃]	huome/home [ˈwome̞]/[ˈo̞me̞]	hombre [ˈo̞mbre̞]	man
plenum	cheo [ˈtʃeo]	cheo [ˈtʃeo]	chẽo [ˈtʃẽo]	chén/ chío [ˈtʃᴈŋ]/ [ˈtʃju]	chẽo	'cheio [ˈʃɐju]	'chen/ỊỊen [ˈtʃe̞n]/[ˈʈʂe̞n]	lleno [ˈʎe̞no̞]	full
trahere	traer [träˈer//träˈɣer]	traer [träˈer]	traer/traguer [träˈer]	trer/traguer ['trer/träˈɣer]	trager	trazer [tɾɐˈzeɾ]	trayer [träˈje̞r]	traer [träˈe̞r]	bring
tu canta(vi)sti	ti cantaste(s) [ti känˈtäste̞(s)]	tu/ti cantaches [tu känˈtätʃe̞s]	tu cantache [tu känˈtätʃe̞]	tu cantache [tu känˈtätʃe̞]	tu cantaste	tu cantaste [tu kɐ̃ˈtäʃtɨ]	tu cantasti [tu känˈtästi]	tu cantaste [tu känˈtäste̞]	you sang

(*) The lateral sound ʎ: Porcia River to Navia River. The lateral sound l: Eo River to Porcia River.

== Diachronic evolution ==
Here is the evolution of the language, taking into account the Monastery of Oscos parchments:

English	Latin	Galician-Portuguese	Portuguese	Mediaeval Galician–Asturian	Current Galician–Asturian
high	altu(m)	outo	alto	outo	alto
tree	árbor(em)	árvol	árvore	árvore	árbol
add	in addere	enader	adicionar	nader	añidir
key	clave (m)	chave	chave	chave	chave
right	directu (m)	direyto	direito	dereyto	dereito/dereto
son	filius (um)	fillo	filho	fillo	fiyo
ward (keep)	guardare	guardar	guardar	gardar	guardar
plant	plantare	chantar	plantar	chantar	chantar
bring	trahere	trager	trazer	trager	trer
wash	lavare	lavar	lavar	lavar/llavar	lavar/llavar
hand	mānu(m)	mão	mão	maao	mao
apple	mattiāna (m)	maçã	maçã	maçaa	mazà
mine	mea (m)	minna/mía	minha	mĩa (mina)	mía
much	multu(m)	muito/ muyn	muito	muito	muito
black	niger /nigrum	nieiro/neiro	negro	neiro	negro
night	nox/nócte(m)	noite	noite	noite	nòite
obligate	obligare	obrigar	obrigar	obridar	obrigar
who	quī / quem	quem	quem	quen	quèn
wall	parĭes/ parĕtem	parede	parede	parede	parede
four	quattuor	quatro	quatro	quatro	cuatro
one (f.)	ūna(m)	ũa/ hũa	uma	ũa	úa
leave	salire	sair	sair	sair	salir
yours	tuus /tuum	teu/tou	teu	tou	tou
truth	veritas/ veritatem	verdade	verdade	verdade	verdá
English	Latin	Galician-Portuguese	Portuguese	Mediaeval Galician Asturian	Current Galician–Asturian

== Phonology ==
=== Vowels ===
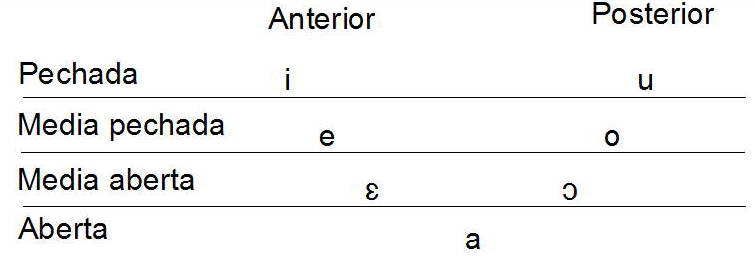
Vowel system in Eonavian.

The system of stressed vowels is similar to Galician since there are seven in both languages; it was used by Ramón Menéndez Pidal when he assigned this language to the group of Galician-Portuguese languages. The system is very stable. It does not find the alterations that can be observed by effects of metaphony in other regions of Galician phonetics.

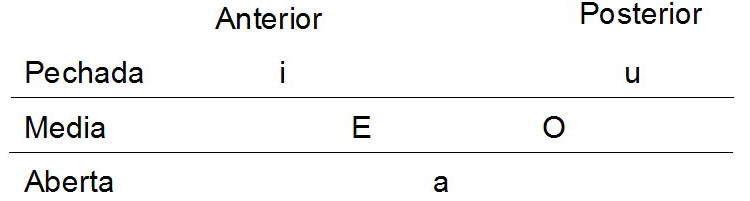
Unstressed vowels in Eonavian.

Here are the vowels obtained by García García in the El Franco village and Fernández Vior in Vegadeo:

• ä Open central unrounded vowel: f1 =700 y f2 =1350 hz (FV); f1 =750 y f2 =1500 hz (GG)

– a: Long open central unrounded vowel: f1 =870 y f2 =1463 hz (FV); f1 =800 y f2 =1537 hz (GG)
– a Open front unrounded vowel: f1 =700 y f2 =1300 hz (FV); f1 =715 hz y f2 =1400 hz (GG)
– ɑ Open back unrounded vowel):

• e Close-mid front unrounded vowel: f1 =450 hz y f2 =1900 hz (FV)

– e Close-mid front unrounded vowel affected by front sound: f1 =475 hz y f2 =1700 hz (GG)
– e Close-mid front unrounded vowel affected by back sound: f1 =525 hz y f2 =1800 hz (GG)

• ɛ Open-mid front unrounded vowel: f1 =700 hz y f2 =1800 hz (FV)
• o Close-mid back rounded vowel: f1 =490 y f2 =1015 (FV); f1 =500 y f2=1075 (GG)
• ɔ Open-mid back rounded vowel: f1 =555 hz y f2 =1100 (FV): f1 =600 hz y f2 =1100 hz (GG)
• i Close front unrounded vowel: f1 =337 y f2 =2300 (FV); f1 =400 y f2 =2600 hz (GG)
• u Close back rounded vowel: f1 =350 y f1 =1185 (FV); f1 =400 y f2 =925 hz (GG)

As it was indicated by García García regarding unstressed vowels, "Unlike other areas of Galician phonetics, there are no relevant differences between open and closed -e- and -o- and the sound of variant pairs can be considered, each with their own archiphonemes, keeping the following system: -i-, E-, a,-O-, u.

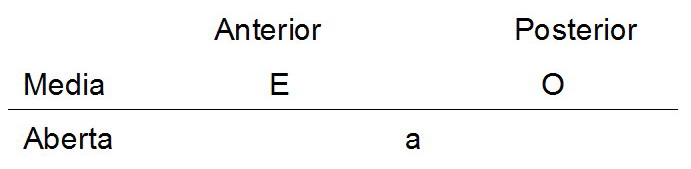
Unstressed vowels in final position

There are three unstressed vowels in final position: -e-,-o-and-a -. There is the loss of the -o endings -ene and -inu, 'sen', 'fren', 'centen', 'allén', 'padrín', 'camín'..., an overall conservation "-e" syllables end, after '-ete' and 'ite' headquarters, 'rede', 'vide', 'parede', etc. It is clearer still in place names 'San Mamede', 'Nonide', 'Taladride'. It is also normal to conserve "-e" after "θ" like in 'couce, 'fouce', etc. On the other hand, under the influence of Castilian, 'salú', 'verdá', 'enfermedá', it has been lost The paragogic vowel -e- after liquids consonant appear very residually, Acevedo y Huelves cites 'carcele'. Final vowel -o- has disappeared in suffix -elo, in toponyms: 'Tol', 'Castropol', 'Boal', etc.

Until the 19th century, nasal vowels were a fairly common phenomenon throughout Eonavian but today are very unusual. Dámaso Alonso was the first in confirming the phenomenon, widespread in the nearby Ancares Mountains. M. Menéndez García finds nasality remains in Freixulfe and points in Villallón Village, y Celso Muñiz in the Valledor region, in the frontier with the Asturo-Leonese languages. These remnants of nasal vowels in Eonavian explain that the syllables ended in nasal coda are always opened, the necessary consequence of velarization, the stage prior to the formation of the nasal.

A change in unstressed vowels when absolute enclitic position has labial consonant and vowel assimilation.

Regarding the unstressed vowels, as pointed out by García García, "Unlike other areas of the Galaicofonía, the relevant differences between open e-y-o and closed sounds can be considered such as variants of two separate couples archiphoneme, keeping to the following system-i-, E-, a,-O-, u.

As is clearly evident by García García, the nasalization of vowels preceding tonic or atonic to ensure –n- in coda "tamen", or situated between nasal consonants "mañá". Vowel lengthening occurs as a result by contractions: "vou à casa" or by compensation as a result of the loss of intervocalic nasal "machacan a 'llá/lá", "Que mañá' nos traiga un bó día de solín". The extension is also in the case of concomitant vowels, like in the proverb "A terra que da á ortiga".

== Diphthongs ==
- Falling diphthong: 'couto', 'souto', 'cantou', 'deitou', 'cantei'...
- Anticipation of the "yod", like: 'naide', 'coiro', 'agoiro', 'cadeira'...
- No nasal diphthong at the end, as noted by Menéndez García as one of the benchmark isoglosses the speeches and Asturleonesas Galaicas.

=== Semivowels ===
- Unlike Galician-Portuguese and Portuguese, Eonavian, like Galician, tends to the abolition of semiconsonants, but it has evolved its own way, linked to treatment of nasality, such as the relative articles "condo", "contó" or the toponyms "Sayane" (Saint John) and the names "Xan" (John), "Xanón" (Big John), etc.
- In Eonavian, as in the rest of the Galaicofonía, is a tendency to anticipatory assimilation, but today, both Eonavian and Galician have a strong influence from Castilian. In both cases, the process does not extend beyond the influence by it: 'naide', 'beizo', 'coiro', 'caldeiro', 'ribeira', etc.

=== Nasal consonants ===
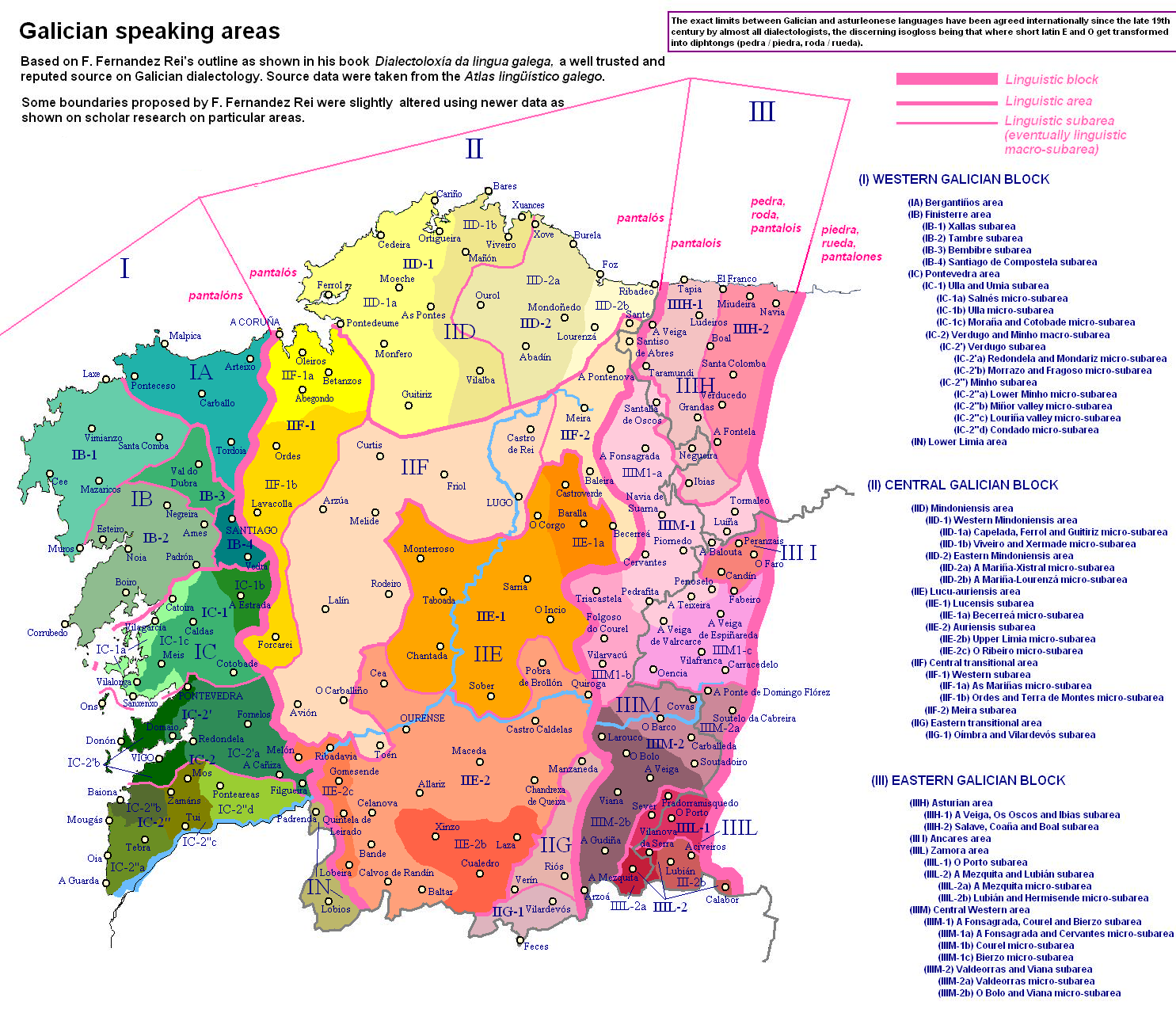
Map about Galician-Portuguese speaking areas taking into account principally the nasality factor. Map based on Fernández Rei's outline, "Dialectoloxía da lingua galega".

- Intervocalic vowels are lost. That fact is the argument of greater weight to those opposed to the theory of Astur-Galician, precisely because there is the curious fact that the phenomenon is accentuated in the municipalities close to the probable Eonaviegos West following a north-south trend is started in Portugal. The fact is manifested in the formation of plurals, on increases in the training of women, but especially in the loss of the nasal-palatal.
- The velarization of nasal vowels and deformation from n-falling.
- The evolution of group Latin nn > n.
- The retention of -mb-.
- The group m'l and m'n changes to m
- The loss of nasal-palatals, in diminutive feminine, vaquía, cousía, roupía, etc. and some masculines foucío, campío, en el sufijo -ieiro/a: cocieira, dieiro, mulieiro, etc.

=== Lateral consonants ===
- The retention of intervocalic lateral consonants: except in the most western counties, the trend is the maintenance of intervocalic -l, except in the cartulary of Villanueva de Oscos Monastery the tendency to the disappearance of the intervocalic -l- is like the rest of the Galician-Portuguese languages.
- The palatalization of the initial lateral and degemination absence of Latin "-ll-". Now, it occurs in only half the territory, but the examination of the Cartulary de Oscos confirm that this phenomenon was widespread in all Galician and Asturian counties from the River Eo and the Navia River.
- The velarization of "B'D" (cold, Dold, etc.), is now a very rare a phenomenon and absent from Huelves Acevedo García, who reported "coldo" and "codo", but it was widespread in the Oscos.

=== Evolution of the Latin groups ===
- The evolution -cl-, -pl- and -fl- to palatal dull sound is agreed about in western Bable and Galician since "che vaqueira" tends to be more fricative (š) than affricate (ć).
- The group -lt-, -ct- and -sc- evolved to it and ix.
- The gj, gi, j, nj, li, gl were palatised.
- The ss evolved to a palatal, dull fricative.
- The gy, -dy-, -sc- evolved to a palatal dull fricative.
- Liquid consonants after occlusives changed to vocalic sounds: oculu > òyo, vetulu > vèyo, apicula > abeya, tegula > tèya, flagrare > cheirar, agru > eiro, cathedra > cadèira.

=== Other phenomena ===
- Fricative occlusives became sharper than Asturian, even more than in Galician: 'louxa', 'vixo', 'dexobado', 'xardía', 'broxa', 'xebrar', 'xastre', 'ameixola', 'èixola'.
- Palatalization of x.
- Distinction between palatals, fricatives and laterals. García García proposes the following oppositions: 'callo' ('callar' verb), cayo ('caer' verb), rayo (meteorological phenomenon), rallo ('rallar' verb), etc.
- Neutralization of liquid pool, but that phenomenon is on the verge of disappearance.
- Retention of Latin -f-.
- Geminate ss evolved to a fricative: Latin passaru > Eonavian páxaro, Latin bassare > Eonavian baxar, etc.

== Morphology ==
=== Verbs ===
The main characteristics of the verbal system are as follows:

- Verbal tenses: indicative present, imperfect, perfect, pluperfect simple, conditional future; subjunctive present and imperfect; Imperative, infinitive simple and conjugate, participle and gerund.
- The synthetic future the construction of the future tense is with the phrase verb 'haber' + pronoun + tense infinitive: "eiyes atizar" u otras "eivos dar", "y'a poñer", which are similar to others used in Galician-Portuguese to prioritise the personal pronoun to the desinence ending: atizaryes-ei, darvos-ei, poñerlle-a. (Note: This type of construction, although less frequent, can be seen in Old Castilian as well, for example the book of the Cifar Knight, (approx. 1300) «bien se que vos pesa, pero conoçerle-hedes esta vegada mejoría". Separable times are documented in Castilian to the 18th century and are still preserved in Judeo-Sephardic.)
- The conjugated infinitive is used subordinate constructions if the infinitive ends or is part of a prepositional phrase; processes have different subjects and aims to avoid ambiguity.
- Metaphonic connotations of the strong verb forms. Like the rest of the family Galician-Portuguese, there is a strong dependence of original vocalism in Latin, and in Galician–Asturian, it is even more conservative. The verbal inflection of Eonavian is conditioned by the loss of the distinction between open and closed vowels in Vulgar Latin. The disappearance of the distinction between unstressed vowels made the mobility of stressed vowels within the verbal root make morpheme prevail over the root in most cases, distinguishing between open and closed position as tonic when it was combined.Thus, the vowels acquired certain metaphonic connotations, to incorporate the distinction into verbal inflection and ignore the etymological origin of the words. The strong personal forms (the three person singular and third plural present indicative, subjunctive and all of the second imperative) are always distinguished by speakers between vowel -e- and open-o and between the strong and weak of forms other than monosyllabic verbs if the stressed vowel of the root morpheme and the match, except for the verbs given duty and irregular in Galician–Asturian. The vowels acquired certain metaphonic connotations, to incorporate the distinction into verbal inflection and ignore the etymological origin of the words. The strong personal forms (the three person singular and third plural present indicative, subjunctive and all of the second imperative) are always distinguished by speakers between vowel -e- and open-o and between the strong and weak of forms other than monosyllabic verbs if the stressed vowel of the root morpheme and the match, except for the verbs given duty and irregular in Galician–Asturian.
- Composite shapes with verb 'ter' (to have). Garcia Garcia and other scholars admit the existence of composite shapes with verb 'ter' as an assistant. However, that is more an approach particular of the authors on the morphosyntax of the compound forms than as the existence of their own specialty in Eonavian. For some scholars this fact is a result of the classification of perfects in resultatives and experientials; in Eonavian the experiential perfect would only be expressed using the periphrastic form with "tener" verb (have). For Natalia Jardon, these constructions are monoclausal and behave like fully grammaticalised auxiliary constructions, but they are restricted in unexpected ways, asking, for this reason, to what extent similar constructions in the Galician dialect could explain the properties observed in Eonavian, concluding that on this particular point we are dealing with independent systems. According to Timothty Gupton, Galician–Asturian does not use the passive with the verb "tener" like a semiauxiliary verb as frequently as other Galician-Portuguese languages, yet goes on to mention two puzzling constructions in this variety of Galician also spoken in the region Navia-Eo (a fala), which are formed with "has" + "ter" + participle and "habías" + ter + participle.

With regard to the system of verb endings, the following particularities should be noted:

- The –des is in the second person plural of every conjugation. García García confirms that although the ending is maintained stably in the second and third conjugations, in the first conjugation, it is giving way to the influence of Castilian -ais and -aides.
- The perfect past –che has in the first person singular: 'veño', 'teño', 'vexo'.
- There is a vocal deformation by the rizotónic effect.
- Infinitive ending in -r- join with pronomes.
- There is a disappearance of –s- in the first person plural to join 'nos' enclitic.
- The -n- paragogic is in the first person singular perfect in all strong and bending double –er, -ir: 'dixen', 'puxen', 'fun', 'salin', 'comín'.
- Endings in -i often take -n paragójica: 'tomein', 'falein', 'subirèin', 'falarèin', 'hein', 'sein'.
- The open -e forms in the first person plural past (coyèmos, dixèmos) or the open o- in second and third person plural (fòmos, fòron).
- The infinitive in –er- in many verbs in Castilian is in -ir: 'morrer', 'encher', 'ferver', 'render', etc., less frequently, the form hesitates: 'valir'/'valer' y 'tosir'/'toser'.
- An alternation occurs -e- open and closed in verbs with-e-open rizotónica for which the -e- radical of the singular and the third person plural.
- Foe verbs ending in '-cer', the first person singular present indicative and subjunctive present are treated as ces: lluzo, 'lluce', 'lluza', 'lluzas', 'lluza'.
- There is an alternation between open and closed in the thematic vowel tonic of most verbs in -er.
- Closed -e- is typical for all persons in the plural of the perfect, six of pluperfect simple, all the imperfect subjunctive in the two series, and forms of the gerund and the first person future, in the first and second person plural present, the plural of the imperative of the first and second person plural of the future, both as in the hypothetical future-e.
- Verbs 'medir' (to measure) and 'sentir' (to feel) show an alternation 'i/e' in the root vowel: with -i-in the strong forms (forms in the singular and the third plural of the present, the singular imperative and all of the subjunctive) and -e-in the weak vowels.
- Like Western Asturian and many areas in Galicia, it stresses the first and second person of the present subjunctive plural.

=== Nouns ===
- The gender and the number are o/a, os/as. These forms are altered the loss of intervolcalic -n-: ratois (mice), caxois (drawers).
- The instability of nasal consonants alters also augmentatives and diminutives: casúa (big house), pedrúa (big stones), casía (small house), pedría (small stone), etc. Diminutive distinguishes four forms: masculine singular -ín "guapín", masculine plural -íos "guapíos", feminine singular -ía, "guapía", and feminine plural -ías, "guapías". In medieval Eonavian the nasalised forms with -ĩ- were preserved, and in some cases have been preserved until recent times in toponymy.
- It is also characteristic of Eonavian to change gender to specify a group or an unknown number of things: "el anada", "el herba", ("a herba" a blade of grass, "el hierba", a grass farod) and in adverbial locutions to "da feito" (in fact), "da remoyo" (soacking), etc.
- Although the neuter gender forms are very widespread, as Frías Conde points out, the use of the forms comes from the influence of Castilian, and the forms used to be unknown in Eonavian.

== Syntax ==
=== Pronouns ===
- The Latin vocalism of the first-person pronoun, albeit with different embodiments, is retained: èu/èo.
- There is a general extension of prepositional contractions of a similar nature. Contractions of unstressed pronouns, accusative dative are used more: mo, ma, mas, cho, cha, chas, yo, yos, yas.
- The accusative and the dative in the personal pronouns are distinguished: the second person is te/che, the third person ye/lo/la. Pronominal form «min» is always a complement with a preposition: a min, por min, de min, etc.
- Use of an interest dative (ethical dative): Eso nun che me gusta nada, vouchéme fer un traxe, llevábachebos un traxe, éche grande, vaiye cansao: the pronomes "che"- and –"ye"- have a sympathetic or interest value to highlight the attention of the recipient of the action. However, the indirect object lost the condition when it is preceded by the reflexive indirect object.
- The lack of reflexive complement.is replaced by different forms: ye: yo, ya, yos, yas, así: deoyo, llevayo, etc.

=== Partitives ===
- Retention of prepositional syntagma partitives (accusative partial) in restrictive clauses or specification of content with transitive verbs. (Note: Usually, the phenomenon is caused by simple ellipsis of the nominal forms.)

=== Prepositions ===
- A, agá, ante, ata, acía, baxo, cara, con, contra, de, dende, en, entre, escontra, menos, pra, prantre, por, según, sen, xunta, tras/tres.

== Chartulary ==
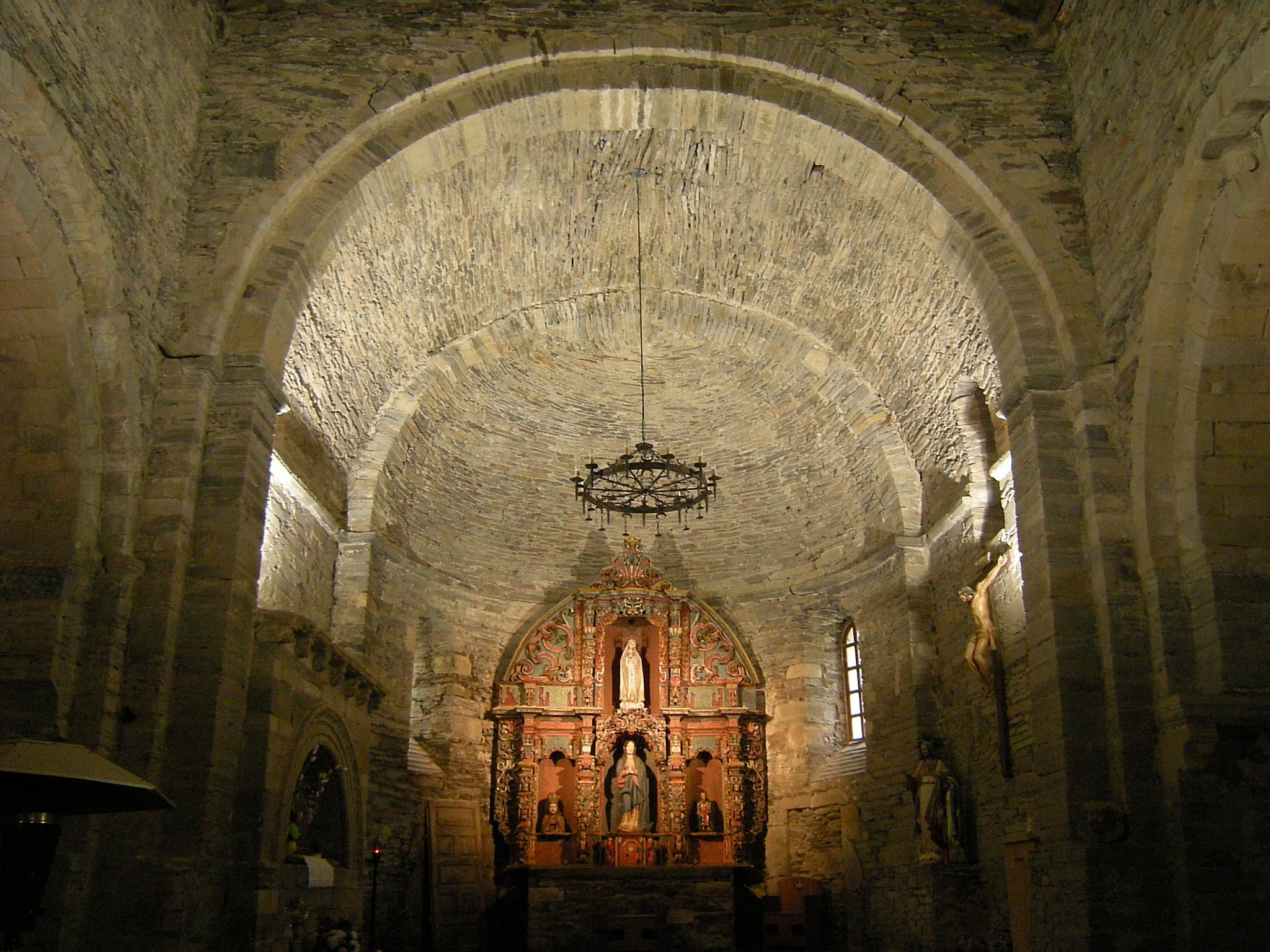
Monastery of Oscos Apse

One of the most relevant aspects of the language is the study of its evolution in the Middle Ages through the parchments which are kept in the Villanueva de Oscos Chartulary, the fourth most important in Asturias after San Pelayo, San Vicente and the Oviedo Cathedral. The documents show the vitality of this language in the Middle Ages and give information on Romance languages in the northwest of Iberian Peninsula. The Chartulary preserves 616 parchments about the Middle Ages: 32 from the 12th century, 261 from the 13th century, 224 from the 14th century and 99 from the 15th century.

The first scholar who dealt with its study was Aureliano Fernández-Guerra in 1865, in the very important article «Speech about the Carther of Aviles». He used extracts of 19 documents from 1256 to 1316. In 1868, Martín Sangrador y Vitores included in his work about the Asturias administration a copy in Galician of the royal prerogative given away by Fernando II to the Abbey. The next edition of the documents about monastery had to wait until the mid-20th century, when the Royal Institute of Asturian Studies (RIDEA) edited the article «El convento benedictino de Villanueva de Ozcos» by Marcos G. Martínez, a rather poor edition. Only in 1981, Pedro Floriano Llorente publishes in RIDEA «Colección dipolomática de Villanueva de Ozcos», which implies an important improvement concerning the previous, both by perfection technical, as by the personal and toponymic references.

Nonetheless, the edition dealt with the issue only as far as 1200. In 1994, the Britonia journal published the second serial of the monastery's parchments, edited by Floriano Llorente, covering until the first half of the 13th century. The edition, however, failed to meet the editors' expectations.because no documents were produced in Romance so Britonia published a second version, less known, to covers until 1300, more interesting for the study of the question.

The works served as a basis to publish another set of documents by Professor Alvárez Castrillón in his book Los Ozcos en los siglos X-XIII, un modelo de organización social del espacio en la Asturias medieval, (2001), but the work addresses only the historic aspects and not the linguistics. In the following years, Professor Sanz Fuentes has published also four other documents with regard to Buron Hospital. Finally, Alvárez Castrillón, edited, in 2008, 605 more parchments as attachments to the book «La Comarca de los Oscos en la Edad Media, poblamiento, economía y poder», and in 2011, he edited 293 more documents from 1139 to 1300, Colección Diplomática del Monasterio de Santa María de Villanueva de Oscos, (1139–1300) and more recently Colección Diplomática del Monasterio de Santa María de Villanueva de Oscos, (1300–1511)

The documents of the chartulary give important information for knowledge of the language spoken in the western Asturias in the Middle Ages. They show the origin and the evolution of this language, but the serial of parchments finishes with the arrival the Congregation of Castile in 1511 at Monastery, the end of a cycle and will be the beginning of a new one, the big economic growth around the iron industry. However, the installation of the reformed order closed the documental history of this language, until its resurgence in the late 19th century.

== Sample texts ==
...Testo uobis et concedo per suis terminis certis per termino de Menustux e inde de super ad petram de Gio a Cornu de Menyones, et ad penna de Teyxeyra, et al Pico pequeno, et allas mestas de Bouspoulim) et como uay pello regueyro a Sobrepe aa pena das ouellas, et inde in directum ad petra Vocatoria et ad aquam de Ferueça et cómodo uertitur aquam al final de Pena Leyra, na Gauia per ubi potueritis inueniere.... Ad patrem (sic) vero regis quingentos solidos boos exsoluat. (1153)

Cunusçuda cousa seia a quantos esta carta viren commo eu María Uicentez de Cedamona vendo a uos abbade don Guillermo de Santa María de Villa Noua d'Oscos e ao conueto desse mismo lugar quanta heredade eu aio e deuo auer en Çedamona por preço qua a mí e a uos ben prougo, conuen a saber: hun boy boon e çen solidos, preço me outorgo por ben pagada e sse mays val doo por Deus e por mina alma e de meus parentes. E de este día en deante seia tirada de nosso poder e seia metuda en no uosso e no do moestero e se alzen da mina parte ou da aldea contra esta uençon contra esta doaçon veer, aia a maldiçon de Deus e a mina e con Iudas eno inferno iasca por senpre e aa uoz del rey peyte çen morabentinos e dobre ao moestero a heredade e a carta uala por senpre. Feyta a carta en Gyo... (late 13th century)

Se vos ende quissierdes yr leyxade a quarta de quanto overdes ao monasterio... a vossa morte venirdes aa septultura do monasterio con vossas mandaciones (1261)

In dei nomine Amen.

Cunnuzuda cousa seia aquantos esta carta viren et oyren. Como nos don Miguel pela gracia de dios Abbade do Monesteyro de Sancta Maria de Vila Noua d'Oscos et ho Conuento dese mismo logar. Damos anos Rodrigo Affonso tam sola mente poren uossos dias emprestamo: amea daquela nossa herdade de vila Donga. Que he ena Vila d'Aures aque tenno de uos Lope Trauesso. Et damos uola todos sous terminos et con todos sous vilares assy comoa nos auemos. Per tal preyto uos damos esta herdade sobredita quela non possades vender nen supinnorar nen enallenar per neguna maneyra et adia de vosso passamento que ffique esta herdade ia dita liure et quita al Monesteyro ia dito con quanto bon paramento enela ouuer.

Et Eu Rodrigo Affonso ia dito obridome per mi et per todas mias bonas et su pena Mil mrs. de Moeda Real; que nunca esta herdade ia dita meu fillo et filla nen quen vener en mias bonas; que nuncaa embarguen al Monesteyro ia dito. Et se meu fillo ou mia filla aesta carta quiseren passar aian amia maldizion et nunca seian herdados en mia herdade, et peyten al Monesteyro mil moravidiis da moeda real et acarta seia sempre atodo tempo valiosa. Et eu Rodrigo Affonso ia dito; recibo de vos don abade et do Conuento ia dito este prestamo que me vos dades et outorgo ben et lealmente de comprir quanto esta carta diz. Et que esto seia mays ffirme et no possa venir en dolda.

Mandamos ambas las partes ffacer esta carta partida per ABC feyta carta en Vila noua d'Oscos XII dias por andar del mes de Junyo en era de mil et CCC et XIII annos. Regnante el rey don Affonso en Leon en Castela en todos los outros sous Rengos ayglegia de Oviedo porgante. Rodrigo Rodriguiz meyrino mayor del Rey eno Regno de Leon et en Asturias, osque presentes foron Suer Lopez prior testis, Pay Martiniz Superior testis. Miguel Celareyro testis, Iohan Pelaiz vestiario testis, Pero Fernandiz cantor; testis Petro Iohanes sucantor testis, Andreu Perez clerigo desancta offemena testis, sou parente pero pelaiz clerigo testis, Lope Díaz testis, Meen Perez testis, Pay Eanes testis, Pero Chazin testis Gonzalo caio testis ffernan Díaz fillo de Diego vello testis et outros muytos que viron et oyron et eu Freire Domingo Monniz Notario puplico de Vila Nova d'Oscos scriui esta carta per mandado danbaslas partos et puys enela meusinal

(12 June 1276)

E por esta doaçión e por esta esmolna que vos Pedro Méndez façedes ao monsterio sobredito e abade e convento que son e que an de de vir, e por cuanto ben e emparamento façedes ao mosterio e prometedes de façer, nos abbade e convento logo de presente reçebemosvos llogo por noso familiar e damosvos e outorgamos parte en todo o ben que se feçer no mosterio de Santa María de Villa Nova en toda a orden de Cistel ata o día da fin do mundo... (late 13th century)

Sepan quantos esta carta viren commo Teresa Meen, frada profesa no Monesterio de Santa María de Villa Nova d'Oscos, do en doazon al dito monesterio, por las almas de meu padre de mina madre e mía, e de aquelos a quen eu son teuda, todos benes asy mobres commo rayzes que eu aio en Lanteyro, en Bullaso, en Lavallos e en Mon, e en todos los terminos e jurdiçon da Probra de Castropol, e otorgo e mando que seian do monesterio todos, por quanto os mandaron y meu padre e mina madre con meu otorgamento. E vos, o dito don Abbad e convento, non me avedes a tirar estos erdamentos nen parte de delos, nen los otros que y el monesterio que levava meu padre e mia madre por los trinta maravedís según teno huna carta per que nos aforastes e dovos liçençia que vos pósades trocar e ministrar por lo dito foro os novos delos. E non avedes a dar nen aforar, nen vender, nen supinnorar, nen allear, nen malparar estos ditos herdamentos e benes. E Eu Teresa Meen frada profesa do dito monesterio asy o otorgo e prometo de ter e gardar todo esto que se aquí reconta. (1377)

...per tal preyto e condyçon vos aforo estas ditas herdades que as lavredes ben, e paredes ben, e que diades nos el dito don Abade e monesterio por foro cada anno huna taega de bon centeno medido per la medida dita de Santalla, livre de polvo e de palla; e que seyades amigos boos e leales do monesterio ennas cousas que vos poderdes, e qe estas ditas herdades que vos non posades vender nen subpynorar nen escabyar a outra parte por ninguna manera, e a la morte ou saydo del postermeyro de vos a los desste foro sayr que nos fiquen ao dito monesterio as ditas erdades lyvres e quitas e desenbargadas de vos e de vosa voz con todos sous chantados e aboamentos que elas estevere, vosa novydade alçada dando al monesterio aquelo que lle deverdes deste dito foro as quales herdades iaçcen su signo de Santalla d'Oscos... (1417)

Sepan quantos esta carta viren commo nos don Lope abbad del moesterio de Santa María de Uilla Nova d'oscos, e prior e conuento do dito moesterio aforamos a uos Lopez Pérez e a uosa muller Ynés Fernández, e a os fillos e netos que ouierdes unos de outros, conuén a saber que uos aforamos o noso casal de Bustapena asy commo lebóu e usou Miguel Andrés que ende moróu, casa e orrio e teytos e paos e erdamentos [bravos e] mansos que lle pertenescen e con la erdad que foy de [...] Domínguez e de Aluaro que lauraua Aluaro de Perdigueros. [Esto] todo asy commo senpre andóu esto commo dito [he vos] aforamos que déades e pagedes de foro en cada hun anno todos los foros e deretos ao convento e [ao moesterio] asy commo pagaua o dito Miguel Andrés e desta erdad que auedes de dar el quarto a Dominga Fernández por seus días muller que foe de Aluaro de Perdigueros... (1466)

Deita palla al boi Gonzalvo
Deita palla á ó boy
Freija Ferrández fiandera honrada
puja cada fío, va pucherada (late 16th century)

Lliras che quito, nel marco las poño, toma, can, lliras y pan.
En Villanova nin vaca nin nora nacen os gutos y votanlos fora.
En Llanteiro nun hay mozas, en Mezà todas son veyas, en Miñagon milindrosas y en Serandías a fror d'ellas.
Pernas tortas das Cavanas, regallóis os da Pilella, chamuscados os de Boal, viva el llugarín de Armal.
Veite cerzo, cercellín, de este valle regueirín, qu'ei che vèn Xuan de riba, xurando y devotando, que ch'a partir ua dida, si te coye costa arriba, que ch'a partir un brazo si te coye costa abaxo.

Polavila polavila, Eu ben sei donde la hay, indo porlo río arriba no moliño de meu pay. (Villanueva de Oscos)

En casa chía, llougo se fai a cía.
Condo che dian a oveya, coye a corda y vay por ella.
As cuitas ayías, num me quitan dormir.
A mía fiya arruita fame muita, a mía nora vocía e de chía.
A terra que da á ortiga è pra mía fiya/, a que nun la cría è pra mía vecía
Pra que nun queren, teño èo abondo
Antroido, godoiro, paso por Arbon con un cesto na mau comendo rapón.
D'os sesenta pra riba, nun moyes a barriga.
De valdre texen os cais, que nun rompen a roupa.
A vaca da mía vecía, da meyor lleite ca mía.
Condo Dios nun quer, os Santos nun poden.
Que mañá nos traiga, un boo día de solín.
Arco de veya revolve na terra, col dido monín que nun chova por mín, col dido pulgar que chova nel mar.
Foyas na figueira, farros na ribeira.
Cerco lluar ponte a enxugar.
Xente de marina, xente de gran caldeirada, día de muyto víspera de nada.
Home fraque y non de fame, mira que nun te agarre.
Condo chove y fai frío, cantan os gallos na veira del río.
Condo Dios quer, de todos os ventos chove
El anada de un mal ano, máyase nun eirado.
Cantaide nenas, cantaide, /cantaide y nun teñais pena/que ven un barco de mozos/ a dous cuartos á docena.
Si a Candeleira chora/ el inverno xa vai fora / si a candeleira rí / El inverno ta por vir
Alló enriba, nun, sei unde, encontrein con nun sei quen, en casa de xa me esqueice, nun me podo acordar ben.

Este neñín que teño nel collo
e d'un amor que se tyama Vitorio,
Dios que madeu, treveme llongo
por non andar con Vitorio nel collo. (Navia)

As laxas d'a nosa entrada tan, madeus, muito moyadas, non miou mia sogra por elas e que anuncian a xelada
Poderan ser cuadradas y tamén alongadas mais nunca veredes cocías redondiadas

— Labandera Campoamor, JA; Boletín de letras del Real Instituto de Estudios Asturianos nº 71, 1970,

(River Eo)

Ayer dicícheme c'hoy
hoy dicesme que mañá
y mañá as me decir
¿Cocéronxe xa as patacas?
– Non: pero eiyes atizar candela –

Vaich'a fer muito bèn
Tèdes que vir a fèsta
¿Pareceche que fòron us nenos, us lladrois ou us parcoteixos us que tiraron as patacas al alto?
¿Sachasche el hòrto, atendich'as vacas ou fixich'a xanta?
Fun al eiro, pero nun puiden sachar nada?
Teis que ter ma(i)s tempo al fougo, parecem'a min esa caldeira.
De recoyeredes entre us dous, el herba, è fácil que nun vola piye'l augua
Tèinch'ua búa chía de d'herba
Vid'a mía casa pra miraremos esos llibros
Xa verás como en chegando'l vrao, imos a'ndar de fèsta'n fèsta
Nun vos quèro delante, iscai xa!

== Variants according to ALPI ==
Here are the results by ALPI quiz (Atlas Lingüístico de la Península Ibérica, 'Linguistic Atlas of the Iberian Peninsula') in the 1930s in regard to the following points placed among Eo and Navia rivers and the general rule set out for all the region by Acevedo y Fernández in the first dictionary of the language, published in 1932.

English	Acevedo y Fernández 1932	As Campas Castropol Low Eo	Salgueiras Oscos Mid Eo	Neiro Fonsagrada High Eo	Navia de Suarna High Navia	Boal Boal Mid Navia	Freiral Navia Low Navia
water	augua	auga ['awga]	auga ['awga]	auga ['awga]	auga ['awga]	auga ['awga]	augua ['awgwa]
to	pra	pra ['pra]	pra ['pra]	pra ['pra]	pra ['pra]	pra ['pra]	pa ['pa]
sowing	sema	somènta ['somᴈnta]	somènta ['somᴈnta]	semènta ['semᴈnta]	sementa ['sementa]	sema ['sema]	sema ['sema]
how many	conto	cònto ['kɔnto]	canto ['kanto]	cuanto ['kwanto]	cuanto ['kwanto]	cònto ['kɔnto]	cònto ['kɔnto]
sing	cantaide	cantaide [kan'taide]	cantai [kan'tai]	cantadie [kan'tadje]	cantái [kan'tái]	cantái [kan'tái]	cantade [kan'tade]
naked	espido	espidu [es'piðo]	espido [es'piðo]	encoiro [en'koyro]	despido [es'piðo]	encoiro [en'koiro]	desnudo [ðes'nuiðo]
woman	muyer	muyᶻer [muᶻ'ʝer]	muller [mu'λer]	muller [mu'λer]	muller [mu'λer]	muⁱyer [muⁱ'ʝer]	muyer [mu'ʝer]
eye	oyo	òyᶻo [ˈɔᶻʝo]	òllo [ˈɔλo]	òllo [ˈɔλo]	òllo [ˈɔλo]	òⁱyo [ˈɔⁱʝo]	òyo [ɔʝo]
ear	oureya	oreyᶻa [oreʝᶻa]	oᵘrella [oʷ'reʎa]	orella [o'reʎa]	orella [o'reʎa]	oreⁱya [oreʝⁱa]	oureya [owreʝa]
hearing	ouguido	ouguido [ow'giðo]	ouguido [ow'giðo]	oído [o'iðo]	oído [o'iðo]	ouguidu [ow'giðu]	ouguido [ow'giðo]
weep	chorar	chorar [ˈt∫orar]	chorar [ˈt∫orar]	chorar [ˈt∫orar]	chorar [ˈt∫orar]	chorar [ˈt∫orar]	chorar [ˈt∫orar]
tear	----	lágrima [ˈlagrima]	lágrima [ˈlagrima]	lágrima [ˈlagrima]	lágrima [ˈlagrima]	llágrima [ˈλagrima]	yárima [ˈʝagrima]
hand	mao	mãu [ˈmão]	mãu [ˈmãw]	mãu [ˈmãw]	mãu [ˈmãw]	mãu [ˈmãw]	mãu [ˈmãw]
finger	dido	dido [ˈðido]	dido [ˈðido]	dido [ˈðido]	dédo [ˈðedo]	didu [ˈðido]	dido [ˈðido]
leg	perna	pèrna [ˈpᴈrna]	pèrna [ˈpᴈrna]	pèrna [ˈpᴈrna]	pèrna [ˈpᴈrna]	pèrna [ˈpᴈrna]	pèrna [ˈpᴈrna]
foot	pe	pè [ˈpᴈ]	pè [ˈpᴈ]	pè [ˈpᴈ]	pè [ˈpᴈ]	pè [ˈpᴈ]	pè [ˈpᴈ]
tooth	dente	dènte [ˈðᴈnte]	dènte [ˈðᴈnte]	dènte [ˈðᴈnte]	dènti [ˈðᴈnti]	dènti [ˈðᴈnti]	dènte [ˈðᴈnte]
quiet	quieto	quieto [ˈkieto]	quieto [ˈkieto]	quieto [ˈkieto]	quieto [ˈkieto]	quietu [ˈkietu]	quieto [ˈkieto]
mare	eugua	ègüa ['ᴈgwa]	ègüa ['ᴈgwa]	ègoa ['ᴈgoa]	ègüa ['ᴈgwa]	èuga ['ᴈgwa]	ŷegua ['ʝᴈgwa]
axis	eixe	eixe ['eiʃe]	eixe ['eiʃe]	èixe ['eiʃe]	eixi ['eiʃi]	eixe | ['eiʃe]	eixe | ['eiʃi]
devil	demo	demo [ˈðemo]	dèmo [ˈðᴈmo]	demo [ˈðemo]	demo [ˈðemo]	demoniu [ˈðemoniu]	demonio [ˈðemonio]
gum	enxigua /enxiba	enxiba [enˈ∫iba]	enxiba [enˈ∫iba]	enxiba [enˈ∫iba]	enxiba [enˈ∫iba]	enxiba [enˈ∫iba]	meya [meˈʝa]
breast	---	pecho [ˈpet∫o]	peito [ˈpeito]	peito [ˈpeito]	peito [ˈpeito]	pechu [ˈpet∫u]	pecho [ˈpet∫o]
knot	nougo	nougo [ˈnowgo]	nó [ˈno]	nó [ˈno]	nó [ˈno]	nougo [ˈnowgo]	nougoᵘ [ˈnowgo]
kick	couz	couz [ˈkowθ]	couce couz [ˈkowθe]	couce [ˈkowθe]	couzi [ˈkowθe]	cou(z) [ˈkowᶿ]	couz [ˈkowθ]
joke /join	xoncer	xoncer ['ʃoncer]	xoncer ['ʃoncer]	xoncer ['ʃoncer]	xoncèr ['ʃoncer]	xoncèr ['ʃoncer]	xoncer ['ʃoncer]
milk	leite /lleite	leite ['leite]	leite ['leite]	leite ['leite]	lèiti ['lᴈiti]	llèite ['λeite]	ŷeite ['ʝeite]
ox	boi	bòi ['bɔi]	bòi ['bɔi]	bòi ['bɔi]	boi ['bɔi]	bòi ['bɔi]	bòi ['bɔi]
cricket	---	grilo ['grilo]	grilo ['grilo]	grilo ['grilo]	grilo ['grilo]	grillo ['griʎo]	griŷʸo ['griŷʸo]
dove	palomba	palomba [pa'lomba]	palomba [pa'lomba]	palomba [pa'lomba]	palomba [pa'lomba]	palomba [pa'lomba]	palomba [pa'lomba]
frog	ra	ra ['ra:]	ra ['ra:]	ra ['ra:]	ra ['ra:]	ra ['ra:]	ra ['ra:]
wolf	lobo /llobo	lobo ['lobo]	lobo ['lobo]	lobo ['lobo]	lobo ['lobo]	llobu ['ʎobo]	ŷobo ['ʝobo]
iron	fèrro	fèrro ['fᴈro]	fèrro ['fᴈro]	fèrro ['fᴈro]	ferro ['fero]	fèrro ['fᴈro]	fèrro ['fᴈro]
flame	lapa /llapa	lapa ['lapa]	lapa ['lapa]	lapa ['lapa]	llapa ['ʎapa]	llapa ['ʎapa]	ŷapa ['ʝapa]
English	Acevedo y Fernández 1932	As Campas Castropol Low Eo	Salgueiras Oscos Mid Eo	Neiro Fonsagrada High Eo	Navia de Suarna High Navia	Boal Boal Mid Navia	Freiral Navia Low Navia

== Modern Surveys ==
Between 1974 and 1977, three researchers, Francisco Fernández Rei, Manuel González González, and Rosario Álvarez Blanco, affiliated with the Instituto da Lingua Galega, coordinated the publication of the Atlas Lingüístico da Lingua Galega (Alga), which covers eight towns in the region: Salave, Coaña, Porzún, Boal, Vilanova, Pesoz and Saint Antolín. A total of 2,711 questions were collected in a database that includes the text of the answers and extensive supplementary information.

== Literature ==
The first known writer in Eonavian perhaps could be Fernan Soares de Quiñones or Quinhões dos cancioneiros, a troubadour of the last third of the 13th century. He was the author of four songs of moral satire, known as (cántigas de escarnio y maldecir). One of the cántigas relates, in ancient Galician-Portuguese language, to the "costumes" (manners) and "feituras" (facts) of the "Cavalon" (old horse), which tells the adventures of a nobleman who lived in Seville, and had come from Oscos Region in "Esturas" (Asturias) on the border with Galicia. The verses are included in a "cántiga" that is within the theme of "escarnio" (ridicule) and "maldecir" (cursing) but with the impersonation which is typical of the "Cántiga de amigo" (friend song). Anyway, it seems that the reference to the knight of Oscos presents allegorical connotations to the origin of the Asturian knight that might be related with the type of speech used in the cantiga.

After the arrival of the Castilian Congregation at the monastery of Santa María de Villanueva de Oscos in 1511, the written record of the language ended until its resurgence in the late 19th century.

In the early years of the 20th century was an identification with Galician, reflected in authors like Cotarelo Valledor and Antolin Santos Ferraria, who wrote entirely in Galician. Fernandez and Fernandez and Bernardo Acevedo Huelves were the first authors who are aware of the peculiarities of this language. The latest one is usually attributed the first sonnet in this language: "Vusté era un gran señor, Eu era un gran probe"(You was a great lord, I was a large poor man). A poet contemporary of them was Ramón García González, (1870–1938), who showed the influence of the modernist spirit, prevailing in the early 20th century. His best-known work is a long poem entitled "El xardín". Another poet in that time was Villar Conrado Loza (Taramundi 1873-Tapia 1962), who focused on themes around migration, recurring theme in folk literature on the early 20th century.

After the Spanish Civil War was a decline of the literature in Asturian Galician, which lost the identity features that were beginning to appear. Folk literature was mixing Galician and Castilian and tended to be anecdotic rather than purely literary. In the 1970s, thanks to the work of authors such as Damaso Alonso, writers of the western end of Asturia began to reaffirm the identity of their language, such as Manuel Garcia Sanchez, known Manolo Galano, particularly concerned about the popular culture of the region and published, in 1994, with Jacinto López Díaz "Vocabulario da Roda" and had published in 1984: "Cuentos Parzamiques". He was a frequent contributor to the magazine Entrambasauguas and published, in 2005, a recast of twenty written contributions to the magazine in the book "Vento d'outono". Beside them are some more recent authors as Xose Miguel Suarez (Mantaras, Tapia, 1965) and Xavier Frias Conde. The writers started their literary careers, from the philological study of the language albeit from very different perspectives.

The difficulty of publishing books for an audience so small makes it most remarkable of all that the literature projects through various magazines of the region. The oldest magazine is "A Freita", which appeared in eleven numbers, a general magazine that started to being published in 1992. Among its contributors were writers like Benigno Fernandez Braña, Xan Castañeira, Xosé Maximo Fernandez Muniz, Adela Valledor Conde, etc. In 1995, the magazine attached a literary supplement, published to makes noticed to the authors of Eonavia in other formats, through a kind of less formal book.

Since 1996, the Department of Linguistics of Eo Navia has published the magazine "Entrambasauguas". Among the writers often to collaborating are Veiguela Crisanto (Vegadeo 1959), Alejandro Blanco Antunez, (Navia 1933), Teresa Lopez, (Boal 1950), Xoxe Carlos Alvarez Blanco, Xavier Vilareyo (Mieres 1967), Fredo de Carbexe (El Franco 1967), etc.

In theatre, there is some tradition like in Villar and Manuel Galano. Lately, old plays have been recovered: "Condo el cariño è de Verdá", a comedy released in 1936 by Association Armal, and "El tratto de FF Arias", premiered in Figueras in 1926.

== Associations ==
In the dialectal area are associations supporting each side, such as Asociación Abertal (defending the Galician theory) and Xeira or Fala Viva (defending the Asturian theory). Its protection and language policy are the responsibility of the Asturian government and the Secretaría Llingüística del Navia-Eo, a division of the Academia de la Llingua Asturiana responsible for the area. There are two different orthographies for Eonavian, the official one (more Asturian-like) as well as one made by the Mesa prá Defensa del Galego de Asturias (more Galician-like).

== See also ==
- Iberian languages
