= Gustavo Pittaluga =

Gustavo Pittaluga may refer to:

- Gustavo Pittaluga (doctor) (1876–1956), Italian doctor and biologist
- Gustavo Pittaluga (composer) (1906–1975), Spanish composer
