= Restrepo (Vegadeo) =

- village
- Location in Spain
- Coordinates: 43°22′50″N 7°0′51″W
- Country: Spain
- Autonomous community: Asturias
- Province: Asturias
- Municipality: Vegadeo
- Parish: Paramios
- Comarca: Eo-Navia
- Judicial district: Castropol
- Highest elevation: 520 m (1,710 ft)

Population (2019)
  - Total: 22
- Time zone: UTC+1 (CET)
  - Summer (DST): UTC+2 (CEST)
- Postal code: 33776

Restrepo is a village located in the parish of Paramios in Vegadeo, a municipality within the province and autonomous community of Asturias, in northern Spain.
