= San Tiso =

Parish in Asturias, Spain

- Parish
- Location within Asturias Location within Spain
- Coordinates: 43.4033°N 7.1323°W
- Country: Spain
- Autonomous community: Asturias
- Province: Asturias
- Municipality: San Tirso de Abres

Population (2020)
  - Total: 412

San Tiso is the only parish in San Tirso de Abres, a municipality within the province and autonomous community of Asturias, in northern Spain.

== Demography ==
Total population is 421 inhabitants (208 men and 213 women). They are distributed in the following list of towns.

- A Antigua (34)
- A Carretera (24)
- A Grandela (14)
- A Mourela (6)
- As Veigas (35)
- Eilale (12)
- Espasande (13)
- Foxas (5)
- Goxe (6)
- Lombal (3)
- Lourido (15)
- Matela (3)
- Naraído (5)
- O Castro (9)
- O Chao (115)
- O Louredal (1)
- Prado (0)
- Salcido (31)
- San Andrés (31)
- Sobredaveiga (6)
- Solmayor (11)
- Trasdacorda (4)
- Valiñaseca (0)
- Vilar (11)
- Vilelas (16)

== Economy ==
Most of the workers work in the primary sector and services.

Employees by economic sector (year 2011)
	Number of workers	Percentage
Total	123	100
Agriculture, animal husbandry and fishing	46	37,40
Industry	6	4,88
Construction	9	7,32
Services	62	50,41

== Churches ==
Its parish temple is dedicated to San Salvador, although it also has numerous chapels such as the Chapel of the Immaculate, of the Virgen del Carmen, of San Isidro, of San José, of San Juan, of San Juan Bautista, of San Miguel, of San Roque, Santa Apolonia and Santa Elena.
