= Martul =

Coordinates: 43.272222°N 7.004167°W

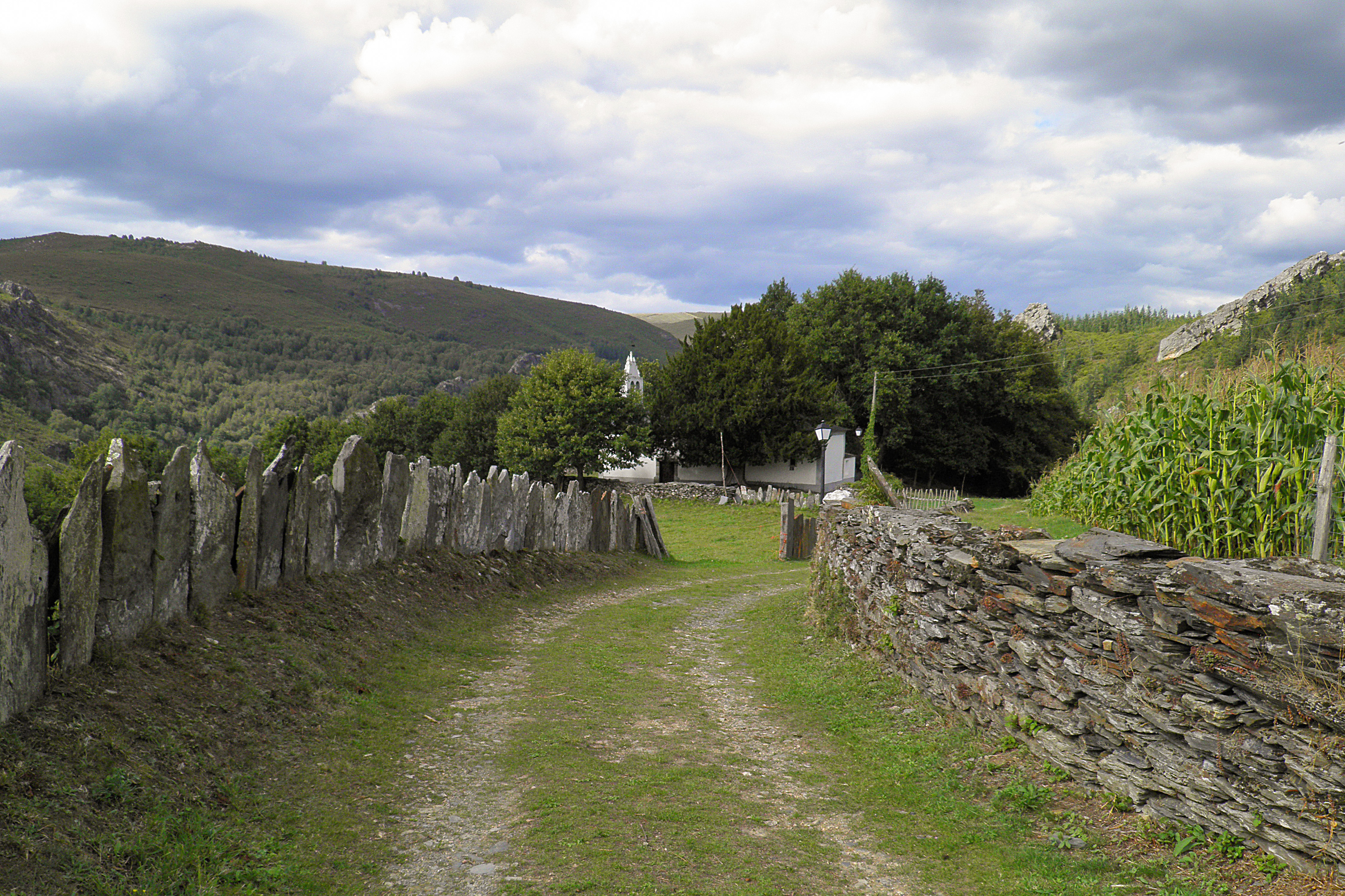

Martul is one of four parroquias, a parish (administrative division) in Villanueva de Oscos, a municipality within the province and autonomous community of Asturias, in northern Spain. It is 5.5 km (3.4 mi) from Villanueva, the capital of the municipality. Situated at 821 m (2,694 ft) above sea level, it has 9.23 km^{2} (3.56 sq mi) area size, with a population of 32 (INE 2011).

== Villages and hamlets ==
- Cimadevila
- Martul
- Salcedo
- Sanamede
- Trabadelo

== Notable attractions ==
- Capilla (chapel) de Cimadevilla
- Iglesia (church) de San Juan El Degollado in Martul
