= Xestoso =

Coordinates: 43.314722°N 7.034444°W

Xestoso (Spanish: San José Gestoso) is one of four parroquias, a parish (administrative division) in Villanueva de Oscos, a municipality within the province and autonomous community of Asturias, in northern Spain.

It is 8.5 km (5.3 mi) from Villanueva, the capital of the municipality.

Situated at 817 m (2,680 ft) above sea level, it is 12.85 km^{2} (4.96 sq mi) in size, with a population of 91.

== Villages and hamlets ==
- Batribán
- Cotarelo
- Regodesebes
- Salgueiras
- As Toleiras
- Xestoso
- Arcaxo
- El Tesouro
- A Casilla
- Morán
- El Xeixo

== Notable attractions ==
- Capilla (chapel) de la Virgen del Carmen in Gestoso
- Capilla (chapel) de Cimadevilla
- Iglesia (church) de San José de Gestoso
