= Piantón =

Parish in Vegadeo, Asturias, Spain

Coordinates: 43.46114°N 7.0288°W

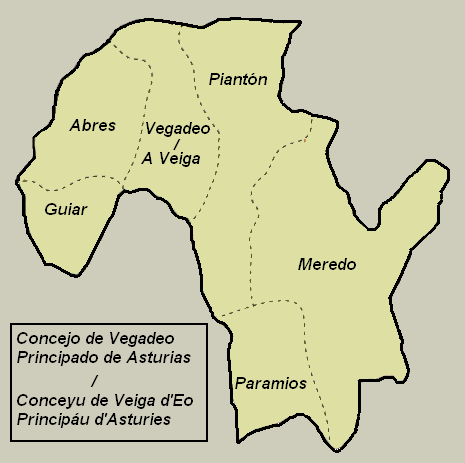
Map of Piantón within the municipality

Piantón is one of six parishes in Vegadeo, a municipality within the province and autonomous community of Asturias, in northern Spain.

The parroquia covers 19.17 km^{2} (7.40 sq mi) and recorded a population of 510 in 2011.

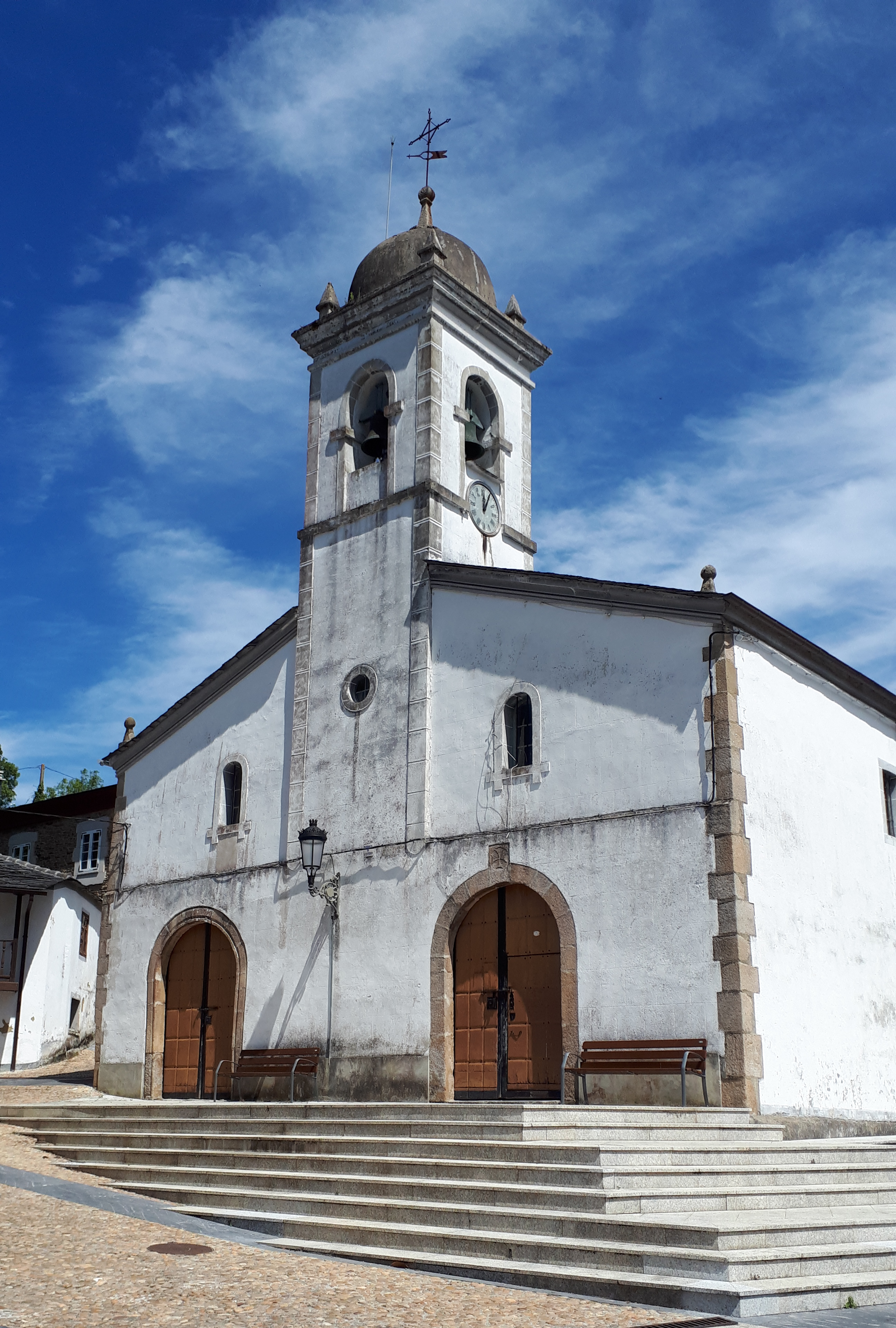
Iglesia de San Esteban

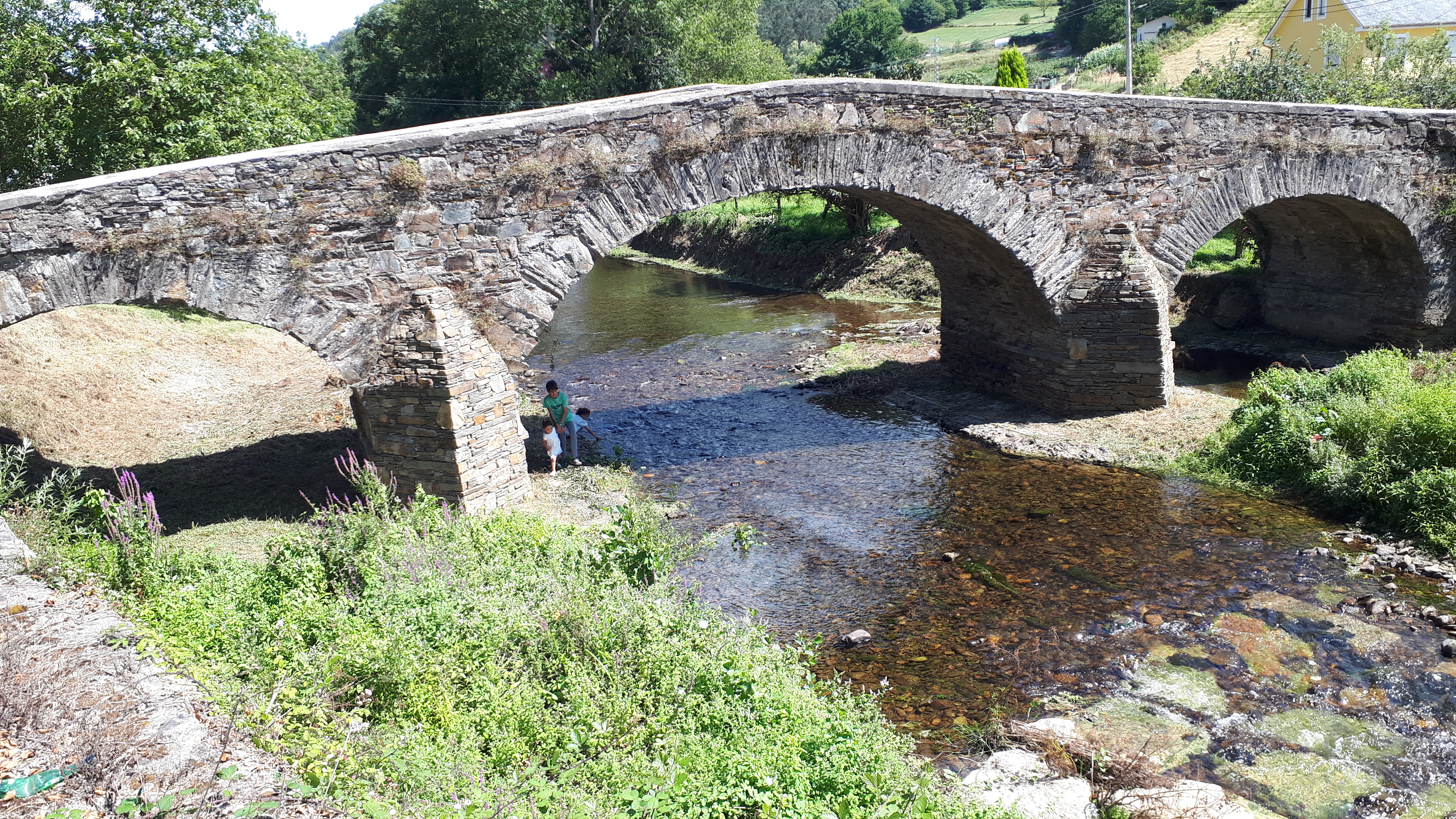
Puente medieval sobre el río Suarón

== Villages and hamlets ==
- Castromourán
- El Chao de Porzún
- A Cova
- Folgueiras
- Montouto
- Piantón
- Porzún
- Veiga de Vilar
- Vesedo
- Vilameitide
