= San Cristobo =

Coordinates: 43.33372°N 6.9766°W

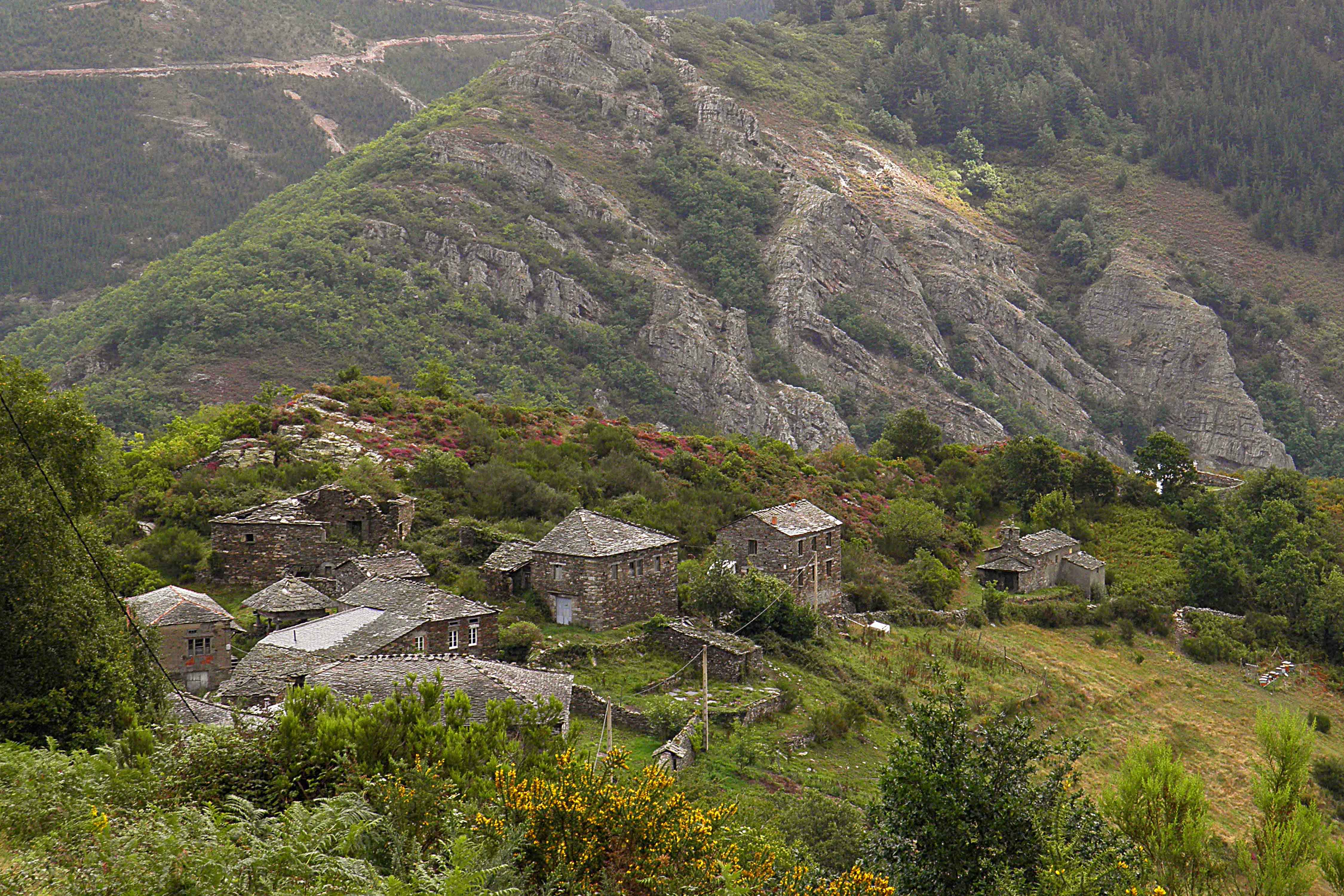
San Cristóbal in 2011.

San Cristobo (Spanish: San Cristóbal) is one of four parishes (administrative divisions) in Villanueva de Oscos, a municipality within the province and autonomous community of Asturias, in northern Spain.

Situated at 471 m (1,545 ft) above sea level, the parroquia is 21.68 km^{2} (8.37 sq mi) in size, with a population of 18 (INE 2011).

== Villages and hamlets ==
- A Bovia
- Busdemouros
- El Busquete
- Moureye
- San Cristobo
- A Sela de Murias
