= Meredo =

Coordinates: 43.42994°N 7.00348°W

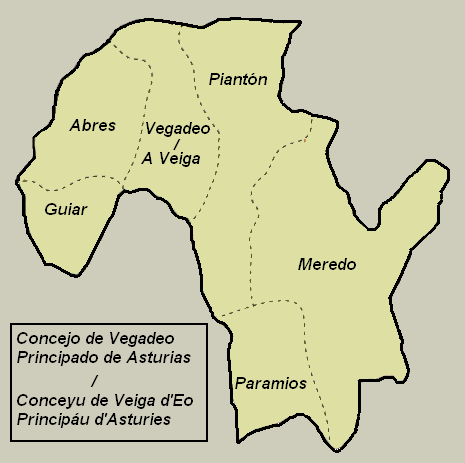
Map of Meredo within the municipality

Meredo is one of six parishes in Vegadeo, a municipality within the province and autonomous community of Asturias, in northern Spain.

The parroquia is 27.87 km^{2} (10.76 sq mi) in size with a population of 258 (INE 2011).

== Villages and hamlets ==
- Bustelo
- A Ferraría
- Meredo
- Molexón (Molejón)
- Nafaría (Nafarea)
- Penzol
- A Quintá
- Vinxói (Vinjoy)
- Xaraz
- Seladaloura
