= Vegadeo (parish) =

- Parish
- Location within Spain
- Coordinates: 43°25′N 7°03′W
- Country: Spain
- Autonomous community: Asturias
- Municipality: Vegadeo

Area
  - Total: 9.79 km^{2} (3.78 sq mi)
- Elevation: 10 m (33 ft)

Population (2024)
  - Total: 3,100
- (estimate)
- Postal code: 33779

Vegadeo (variant: A Veiga) is one of six parishes in Vegadeo, a municipality of the same name, within the province and autonomous community of Asturias, in northern Spain. Covering an area of 9.79 km², it had an estimated population of 3,100 in 2024.

== Geography ==
Vegadeo parish is situated along the Eo River, with an average elevation of approximately 10 meters above sea level. Its terrain includes slate and greywacke geology, with the landscape rising toward the Bobia sierra. The area supports diverse biodiversity, including migratory birds along the Eo River. The parish is approximately 143 km from Oviedo, the regional capital.

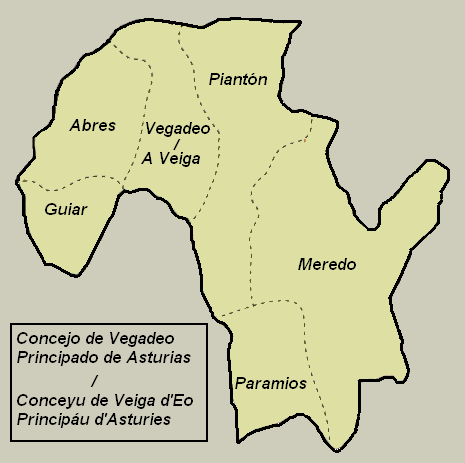
Map of Vegadeo within the municipality

== Settlements ==
Vegadeo parish includes the following settlements:

- Vegadeo (villa)
- Estelo (casería)
- Fonte de Louteiro (aldea)
- Louteiro (lugar)
- Miou (lugar)
- Molejón (lugar)
