= Guiar =

Coordinates: 43.4°N 7.0667°W

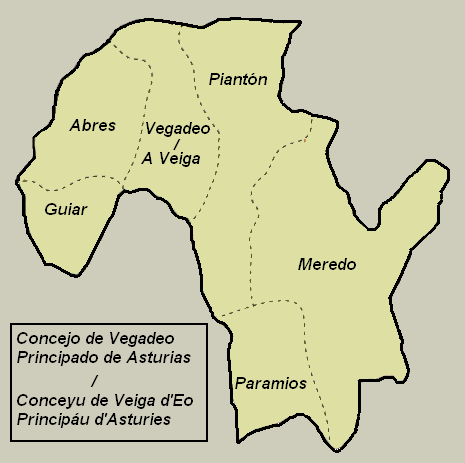
Map of Guiar within the municipality

Guiar is one of six parishes in Vegadeo, a municipality within the province and autonomous community of Asturias, in northern Spain.

The parroquia is 5.55 km^{2} (2.14 sq mi) in size with a population of 44.

== Villages ==
- Graña de Guiar
- Guiar
