= Villanueva de Oscos =

- Municipality
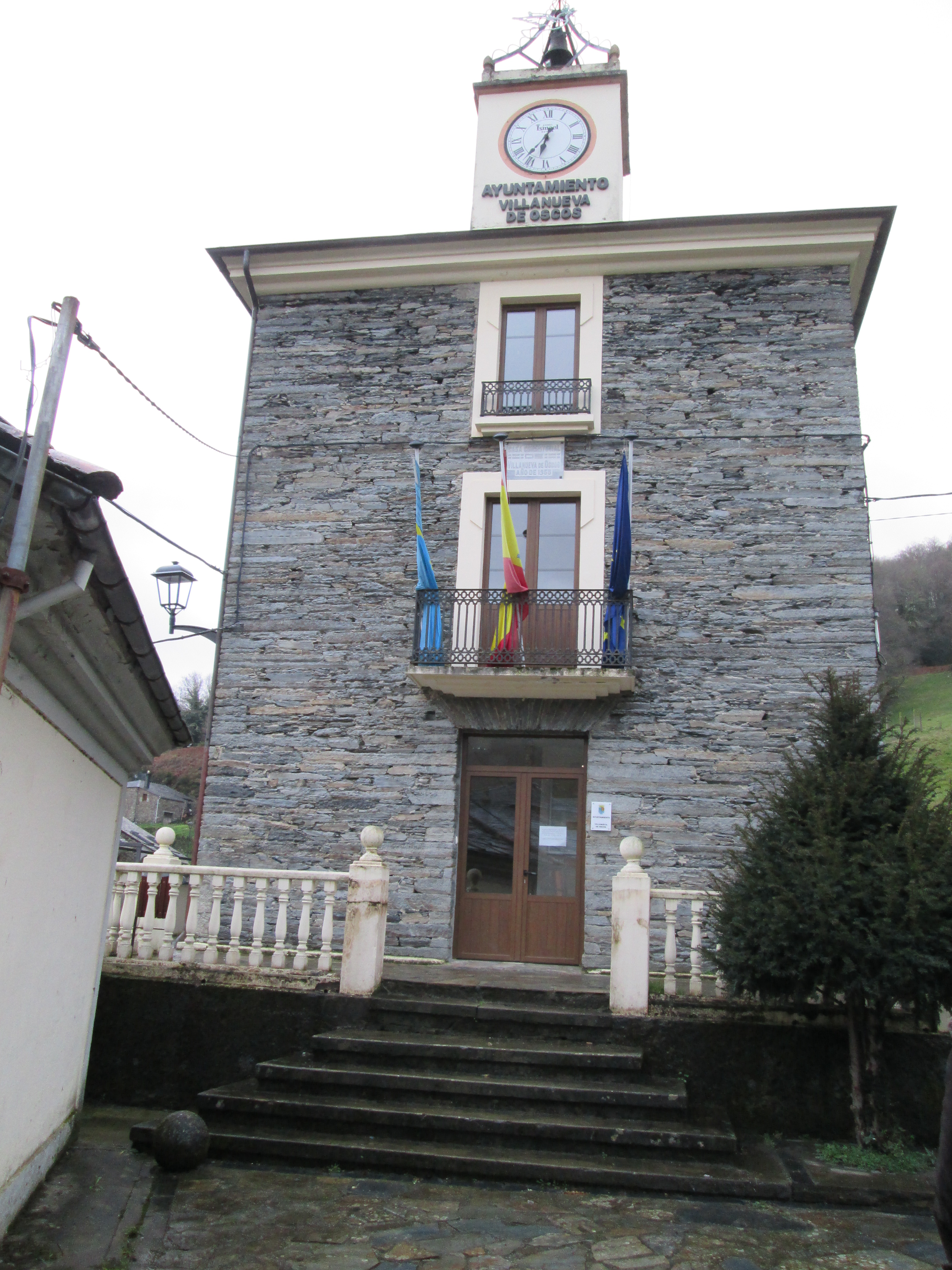
- Town hall

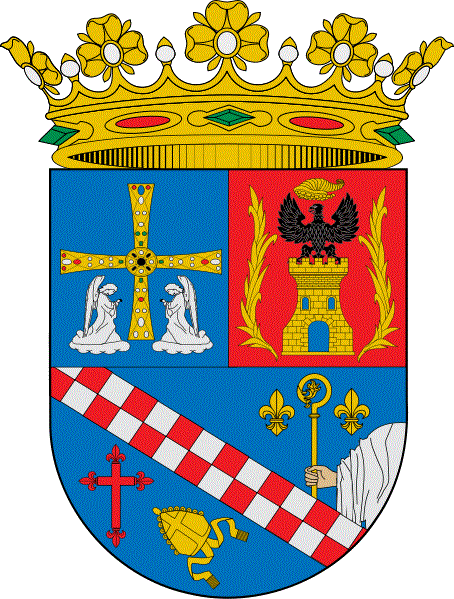
- Coat of arms

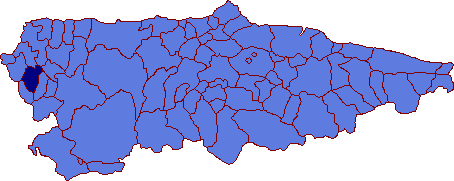

- Location in Spain
- Coordinates: 43°18.7′N 6°59.2′W
- Country: Spain
- Autonomous community: Asturias
- Province: Asturias
- Comarca: Eo-Navia
- Judicial district: Castropol
- Capital: Villanueva

Government
  - Alcalde: José Antonio González Braña (PSOE)

Area
  - Total: 72.98 km^{2} (28.18 sq mi)
- Highest elevation: 1,202 m (3,944 ft)

Population (2025-01-01)
  - Total: 244
  - Density: 3.34/km^{2} (8.66/sq mi)
- Time zone: UTC+1 (CET)
  - Summer (DST): UTC+2 (CEST)

Villanueva de Oscos (Eonavian: Vilanova d'Ozcos) is a municipality in the Autonomous Community of the Principality of Asturias, Spain. It is bordered on the north by Vegadeo and Castropol, on the south by San Martín de Oscos and Santa Eulalia de Oscos, on the east by Illano and San Martín, and on the west by Taramundi.

The medieval Monastery of Santa María de Villanueva de Oscos is located there.

== Population ==
From:INE Archiv

== Parishes ==
- San José Gestoso
- Martul
- San Cristóbal
- Villanueva
