= Vilanova (parish) =

Coordinates: 43.31188°N 6.98625°W

Vilanova (Spanish: Villanueva) is one of four parishes (administrative divisions) in Villanueva de Oscos, a municipality within the province and autonomous community of Asturias, in northern Spain.

Situated at 817 m (2,680 ft) above sea level, the parroquia is 29.22 km^{2} (11.28 sq mi) in size, with a population of 223.

== Villages ==
- A Arruxía
- Bustapena
- El Cortín
- Folgueirarrubia
- A Garganta
- El Mazo
- Morlongo
- A Ovellariza
- Pacios
- Pasarón
- Penacova
- El Río
- Riodopil
- Santa Eufemia
- El Vilar
- Vilarello
