= Paramios =

Coordinates: 43.39095°N 7.01893°W

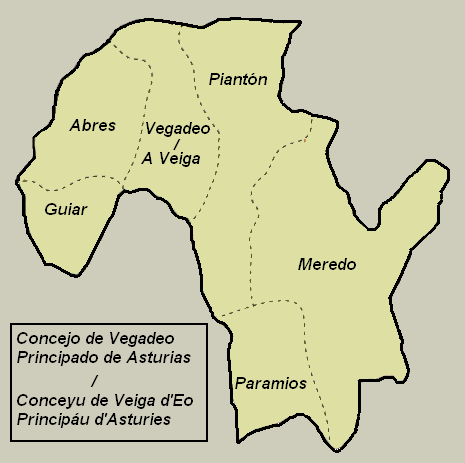
Map of Paramios within the municipality

Paramios is one of six parishes in Vegadeo, a municipality within the province and autonomous community of Asturias, in northern Spain.

The parroquia is 9.89 km^{2} (3.82 sq mi) in size with a population of 89 in (2020).

== Villages ==
- A Barranca
- A Espía
- Monticelo
- Paramios
- Restrepo
- Vijande (Vixande)
