= Abres, Iran =

Abres (Avars) ابرس
- Village
- Location within Iran
- Coordinates: 38°00′21″N 47°29′48″E
- Country: Iran
- Province: East Azerbaijan
- County: Sarab
- Bakhsh: Central
- Rural District: Razliq

Population (2006)
  - Total: 318
- Time zone: UTC+3:30 (IRST)
  - Summer (DST): UTC+4:30 (IRDT)

Avars (Persian: آبرس, also Romanized as Ābres) is a village in Razliq Rural District, in the Central District of Sarab County, East Azerbaijan Province, Iran. At the 2006 census, its population was 318, in 70 families.
