= Abres (Vegadeo) =

Coordinates: 43.4333°N 7.0833°W

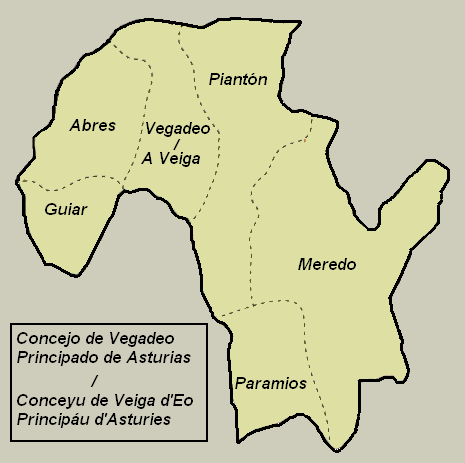
Map of Abres within the municipality

Abres is one of six parishes in Vegadeo, a municipality within the province and autonomous community of Asturias, in northern Spain, near the border with Galicia. The parish is also has hills and close to the Eo River, which offers locals for outdoor activities such as fishing and hiking.

Situated at 70 m (230 ft) above sea level, the parroquia is 10.49 km^{2} (4.05 sq mi) in size, with a population of 217 (INE 2011).

== Villages ==
- As Aceñas
- A Cruxa
- Abraira
- A Antigua
- O Molín
- Grandamiá
- O Pebidal
- A Ponte
- A Rúa

== Historical landmarks ==
- Santa María de Vilanova Church: This church is located in Vegadeo and dates back to the 13th century and features Romanesque and Gothic architectural elements.
