= Revoredo =

Revoredo is a surname. Notable people with the surname include:

- Enrique Labo Revoredo (1939–2014), Peruvian football referee
- Helena Revoredo (born 1947), Spanish businesswoman
- Óscar Alzamora Revoredo (1929–1999), Peruvian priest and architect
- Renzo Revoredo (born 1986), Peruvian footballer
