= Vegadeo =

Vegadeo A Veiga (Eonavian)
- Municipality
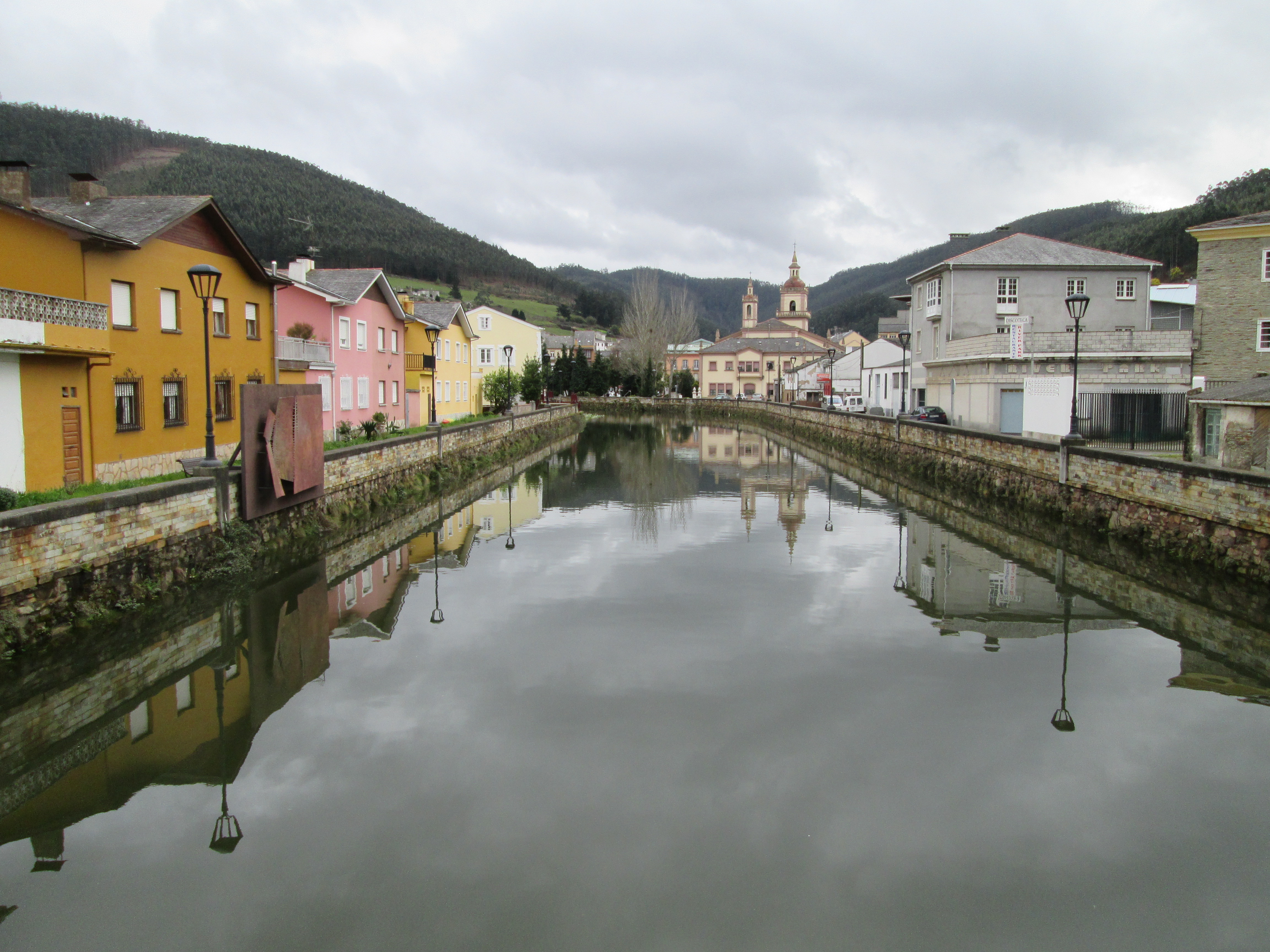
- Suarón river at Vegadeo

- Coat of arms

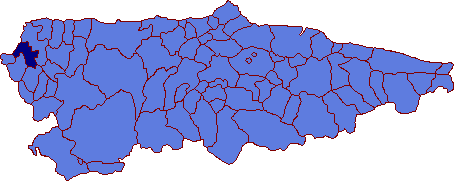

- Location in Spain
- Coordinates: 43°28′N 7°3′W
- Country: Spain
- Autonomous community: Asturias
- Province: Asturias
- Comarca: Eo-Navia
- Judicial district: Castropol
- Capital: Vegadeo

Government
  - Alcalde: Juan de la Cruz Antolín Rato (PSOE)

Area
  - Total: 80.69 km^{2} (31.15 sq mi)
- Highest elevation: 1,130 m (3,710 ft)

Population (2025-01-01)
  - Total: 3,928
  - Density: 48.68/km^{2} (126.1/sq mi)
- Demonym: vegadense o veigueño
- Time zone: UTC+1 (CET)
  - Summer (DST): UTC+2 (CEST)
- Postal code: 33770
- Website: Official website

Vegadeo (Eonavian: A Veiga) is a municipality in the Autonomous Community of the Principality of Asturias, Spain. It is bordered in the north and east by Castropol, in the south by Villanueva de Oscos, Taramundi, and San Tirso de Abres, and in the west by the Eo River and San Tirso.

It is one of the Eonavian speaking towns of Asturias.

== Demography ==
From: INE Archiv

== Parishes ==
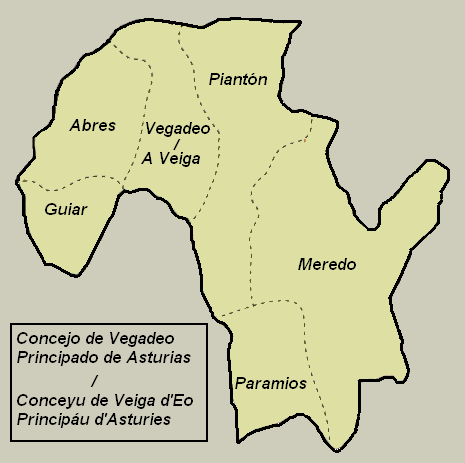
Parish map of Vegadeo.

- Abres
- Guiar
- Meredo
- Paramios
- Piantón
- Vegadeo

== Notable people ==
- Emilio Cotarelo (Emilio Cotarelo y Mori) * 1 May 1857 at Vegadeo † 27 January 1936 at Madrid, Musicologist and Bibliography sciences
- Jimena Fernández de la Vega (1895–1984), physician and researcher
- Eva Moreda, 1981, Galician-language writer and musicologist

== Villages ==
- Abres Pop. 192 (2006)
- Barranca de Paramios Pop. 8 (2006)
- Besedo Pop. 35 (2006)
- Castromourán Pop. 38 (2006)
- Chao de Porzún Pop. 24 (2006)
- Coba Pop. 36 (2006)
- Cobre Pop.19 (2006)
- Espina Pop. 36 (2006)
- Estelo Pop. 16 (2006)
- Folgueiras Pop. 26 (2006)
- Fuente de Louteiro Pop. 65 (2006)
- Graña de Guiar Pop. 27 (2006)
- Guiar Pop. 24 (2006)
- Louteiro Pop. 38 (2006)
- Meredo Pop. 138 (2006)
- Miou Pop. 119 (2006)
- Molejón Pop. 43 (2006)
- Monticelo Pop. 35 (2006)
- Montouto Pop. 36 (2006)
- Nafarea Pop. 23 (2006)
- Paramios Pop.8 (2006)
- Penzol Pop. 38 (2006)
- Piantón Pop. 195 (2006)
- Porzún Pop. 39 (2006)
- Refojos Pop. 56 (2006)
- Restrepo Pop. 31 (2006)
- Seladaloura Pop. 29 (2006)
- Vega de Villar Pop. 44 (2006)
- Vijande Pop. 20 (2006)
- Villameitide Pop. 74 (2006)
- Vinjoy Pop. 43 (2006)

(from: INE)

== See also ==
- List of municipalities in Asturias
