= San Tirso de Abres =

San Tirso de Abres Santiso d'Abres (Galician-Asturian)
- Municipality
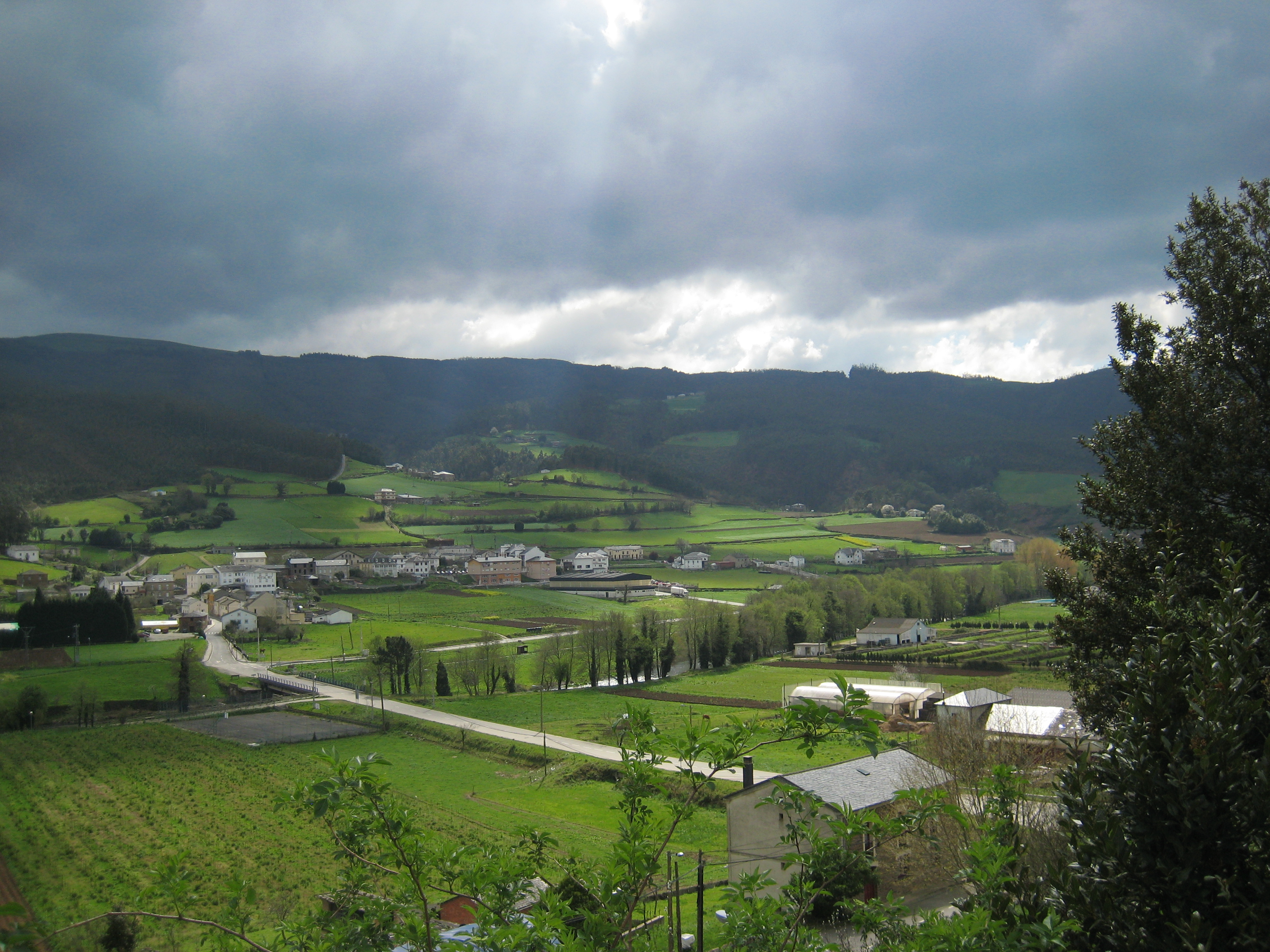
- San Tirso de Abres

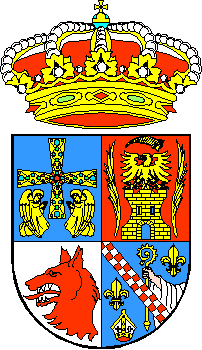
- Coat of arms

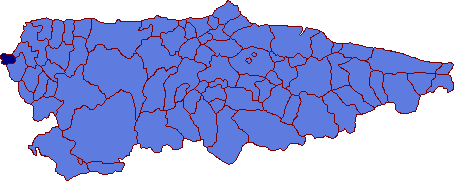

- Location in Spain
- Coordinates: 43°24.5′N 7°8.6′W
- Country: Spain
- Autonomous community: Asturias
- Province: Asturias
- Comarca: Eo-Navia
- Judicial district: Castropol
- Capital: El Llano

Government
  - Alcalde: María Goretti Quintana Rey (PP)

Area
  - Total: 31.41 km^{2} (12.13 sq mi)
- Highest elevation: 664 m (2,178 ft)

Population (2025-01-01)
  - Total: 396
  - Density: 12.6/km^{2} (32.7/sq mi)
- Demonym: santisao / santisá
- Time zone: UTC+1 (CET)
  - Summer (DST): UTC+2 (CEST)

San Tirso de Abres (Eonavian: Santiso d'Abres) is a municipality in the Autonomous Community of the Principality of Asturias, Spain. It is bordered on the north, south, and west by Lugo province of Galicia, and on the east by the municipalities of Taramundi and Vegadeo. It is the westernmost council in Asturias.

The municipality consists of only one parish, San Salvador. It is one of Eonavian speaking councils of Asturias

== See also ==
- List of municipalities in Asturias
