= Gustavo Pittaluga (doctor) =

Italian-born Spanish doctor and biologist

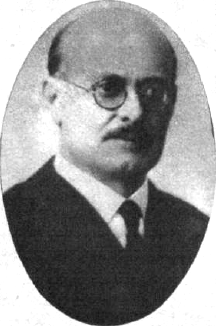
Gustavo Pittaluga

Gustavo Pittaluga Fattorini (1876 in Florence, Italy – 1956 in Havana, Cuba) was a doctor and biologist. Nationalized Spanish in 1904 Pittaluga made contributions to the development of haematology and the parasitology, as well as by his contributions to national and international fight against malaria and other protozoans causing diseases. Pittaluga studied medicine in the University of Rome, where he became a doctor in 1900 with a thesis on acromegaly. Although he had become interested in psychiatry, a subject in which he never lost the interest, he became the assistant of the doctor and naturalist Giovanni Battista Grassi, a specialist in the zoology of invertebrates and protozoans. Grassi was one of the team (including Pittaluga) who demonstrated that malaria is transmitted by mosquitoes of the genus Anopheles.
