= Boal =

Boal Bual
- Municipality
- Coat of arms

- Location in Spain
- Coordinates: 43°25′43″N 6°49′6″W
- Country: Spain
- Autonomous community: Asturias
- Province: Asturias
- Comarca: Eo-Navia
- Judicial district: Valdés
- Capital: Boal

Government
  - Alcalde: José Antonio Barrientos (PSOE)

Area
  - Total: 120.28 km^{2} (46.44 sq mi)
- Highest elevation: 1,201 m (3,940 ft)

Population (2025-01-01)
  - Total: 1,372
  - Density: 11.41/km^{2} (29.54/sq mi)
- Demonym: boalés / boalesa
- Time zone: UTC+1 (CET)
  - Summer (DST): UTC+2 (CEST)
- Postal code: 33720
- Website: Official website

Boal (Galician-Asturian: Bual) is a municipality, a civil parish and a town in the Autonomous Community of the Principality of Asturias, Spain. It borders El Franco and Coaña to the north, Illano to the south, Castropol to the west and Villayón to the east.

The main way of access to Boal is through the regional road AS-12, which connects Navia with Grandas de Salime. The whole municipality has a population of 1,632 inhabitants, whereas there are about 496 inhabitants in the capital town.

== Etymology ==
The origin of the name Boal is considered to come either from the Indo-european languages, *bod- (stream, ditch), or from the Latin, bove or *bovale (ox). Although some authors believe that Boal could be understood as the expression of an old anthroponym or person name, Bovali (iler) or Baudiliu (adducing the form Baudali), it is common to consider its original meaning either as "terreno frecuentado y apropiado para el pasto del ganado vacuno" ("land frequented and appropriate for the grazing of cattle") or as "corral de bueyes o dehesa boyal" ("corral for oxen or ox pasture"). Corominas mentions in Aragonese the words boalage, boalar and "dehesa boyal" ("ox pasture") as derivatives of boal, which would be also a variant of boyal, meaning "perteneciente al buey o al ganado vacuno" ("belonging to ox or to cattle").

== History ==
=== Ancient times ===
There still remain traces proving the existence of settlements in Boal in a time prior to the arrival of Romans. Although it is supposed that there were already populated enclaves in the area during the Paleolithic Age, there are no remains from the period, so such a supposition could not be demonstrated. Nevertheless, remains from the Neolithic Age have reached up to the present day. For example, several burial mounds were found in the mountain range of Penouta in one of the burial mound fields in the whole Asturias, with 72 catalogued tombs. Likewise, dolmens near Llaviada (nowadays disappeared) are supposed to date from this time, together with the oscillating granitic mass known as Penedo Aballón (located near Penouta, knocked down in 2004 by vandals).

The Bronze Age (approximately 1500-1100 BC) is believed to date the anthropomorphic paintings (both masculine and feminine) found in the Cova del Demo ("Cave of Devil" in English), located near the hamlet of Froseira, in the civil parish of Doiras.

Together with the signals of mining work devoted to the extraction of metals and the Celtic fortifications of Pendia, Los Mazos and La Escrita also prove the pre-Roman settlements. The subsequent Roman presence, after the conquest carried out by the legions under command of General Publio Carisio (the X Gemina and the V Alaudae), left imprints such as several coins and ceramics fragments, as well as probably the origin of the names of some small villages such as Vega de Ouria, likely due to the presence of some gold working in rivers at that time. It is believed that the area corresponding to the civil parish of Castrillón was populated by the astur tribe of Pesicos, whereas the area located western from the Navia River would have been inhabited by the gallaeci tribe of Albions.

After about four centuries of Roman domination, the barbarians entered the Iberian Peninsula, and Suebi settled down in the western area of Asturias, reaching their maximum expansion about the year 450. It is known that the Visigoths arrived later, where they occupied the whole territory about the year 584. However, there are very little archaeological remains of all the populations from that time.

=== Middle Ages ===
Little is known about the history of Boal at the beginning of the Middle Ages, during the Asturian monarchy. The fights between the bishops of Oviedo and Lugo for the territories located between the rivers Navia and Eo came to an end by means of an agreement promoted by the king Alfonso VII. Thus, all those territories and Boal included among them were submitted to the bishop of Oviedo by donation in the year 1154, under the generic denomination of territory of Castropol.

In 1368, the bishop D. Gutierre, appointed Alvar Pérez Osorio as "governor" of the Tierra de Ribadeo y Grandas, which comprised the current municipalities of Boal, Castropol, Coaña, El Franco, Grandas de Salime, Illano, Pesoz, San Martín de Oscos, Santa Eulalia de Oscos, Tapia, Taramundi and Vegadeo, having up to 41 parishes. This was a time of many violent uprisings because of the high taxes Pérez Osorio obliged the inhabitants of the area to pay.

Subsequently, bishops created several villages and municipalities, so at the beginning of the 16th century, the Tierra de Ribadeo was divided into five municipalities: Castropol, Piantón, Barres, El Franco and Grandas, with Boal belonging to the municipality of El Franco.

=== Modern Ages ===
The system of municipalities was in force until the arrival of King Felipe II, who obtained permission from Pope Gregory XIII to divide and sell any town, place and jurisdiction, which allowed him to obtain financing for wars and to pay the debt he had. There were attempts of buying jurisdictions by some individuals (with the intention to advance in the social scale), but the most usual was the buying by the people.

This favored that in those years Boal disassociated from the Church. In 1579, Alonso López de Navia y Bolaño, an inhabitant of the town of Navia, gave power to Pedro Bermúdez to arrange with Alonso de Camino, who initially registered the parishes of Serandinas, Boal, Doiras, Pesoz, Coaña, Trelles, Villacondide, etc., expecting to buy them, for shortly after transferring the parishes of Boal, Serandinas and Doiras to Rui Garcia de Cangas in order to reduce expenses.

The fears of the people of villages to depend on the lords, considering the abuses they committed against their inhabitants, led them to "buy themselves" and to incorporate into the Crown. Thus, the parishes of Boal, Serandinas and Doiras were redeemed in 1580, starting to have the jurisdictional status of "realengo" (directly depending on the King).

Boal's independence as a municipality took place in 1584, when representatives of the inhabitants of its parishes met, drawing up the first local regulations and agreeing on the way to choose the offices of town councilors, mayor, constables, attorneys, etc. Thus, parishes became towns with civil and criminal jurisdiction, and representatives would meet once a year to choose the aforementioned offices. At the time, the capital of the municipality changed and it was held in several of its villages (Prelo, Armal, Castrillón, and the town of Boal), but it was returned to Boal in 1791.

During the 17th and 18th centuries, in which the predominant activities in Boal were agriculture and cattle farming, beautiful family seats and palaces were built in the municipality, but most of them have been almost completely disappeared, although with some exceptions such as the Palace of Miranda, in the village of Prelo. The 18th century was considered the most prosperous for the municipality, due to the fundamental farming activities, which also made the craftwork industries noticeably important; by the middle of the century, there were 4 fulling mills and 8 mallets to stretch iron, one forge, and 42 mills for grain.

=== 19th century ===
It is also known that during the Spanish War of Independence, the French troops occupied Boal in the belief that the town hosted a weapons factory. A group of inhabitants of Boal took part in the "Alarma del cerezal" (a group of people who met to avoid an invasion or to defend from the enemy), but they could not avoid Maurice Mathieu’s soldiers to invade the town on March 19, 1809, establishing a camp in Llaviada, and causing numerous deaths, plundering and damages.

A few years later, in 1814 and 1820, Serandinas unsuccessfully tried to become a municipality independent of Boal. Furthermore, in July 1823 noticeable damages were caused by a group of about 24 robbers commanded by Miguel Álvarez Samartino de la Trapa, who stole money from the taxes income and tore documents of the municipal secretary’s office. It is believed that two inhabitants of Armal could have taken part in these happenings, but they could not be captured as people in their village would have covered them up.

During the Carlist Wars the municipality was invaded again: in 1836, a guerrilla group commanded by San Breixo entered in Boal, but he was captured in the following year and subsequently executed by firing squad in the cemetery of Piantón by a militia formed in Boal. Shortly after, in 1837, it was inaugurated the parish church devoted to Santiago Apóstol, and in 1842, the town hall and the jail.

The cholera epidemic of 1854 and 1855, took place in this municipality, although it was not excessively virulent. That was not the case with the smallpox epidemic of 1870, much more serious and deadly.

During the century, Boal saw the birth of one of its most distinguished figures, Bernardo Acevedo y Huelves, whose name was later given to the municipal library. Among his works are the "Boal y su concejo" ("Boal and its municipality"), a picture of the way of life and the customs in the municipality at the end of the 19th century, which also shows the importance the industry of iron forge (at present disappeared).

In connection with this is the uprising that took place in 1895, in which the forgers of the municipality destroyed all the machines for making tacks that Víctor Sánchez, a local businessman, was installing in the village of Armal with the aim to start a strong tacking industry able to face the great external competition, especially that English one, which finally made unfeasible the traditional means of working iron in the municipality.

=== 20th century ===
The end of the 19th century and the beginning of the 20th were years of important migratory flows, especially to the Americas. From these years date several large houses, property of emigrants who had made fortune in the Americas, such as for example Villa Anita. In addition, the money furnished by many emigrants contributed decisively to the construction of various schools in several villages of the municipality and the elementary school of the capital town, known as "Las Graduadas", in 1934, which was promoted by the "Sociedad de Instrucción Naturales del Concejo de Boal" ("Association for the Education Natives of the Municipality of Boal") in La Habana (Cuba). Also in these years several public washing houses were built in the municipality.

Some other infrastructures of capital relevance for Boal were built at the beginning of the 20th century. That was the case of the road connecting Navia and Grandas de Salime, with the construction of the stretch from Navia to Boal. Furthermore, in 1934 it was built the dam of Doiras, and in the year 1951 it was started the large-scale exploitation of the tungsten mines near Penouta, although they closed in 1961.

The decadence of tungsten mining, which had employed up to 254 workers, and the end of the construction of the big reservoirs along the Navia River, together with the gradual abandonment of cattle farming (still at present the main economic activity of the municipality) led to new migratory flows, especially from the 1950s on, but in this case they were directed preferentially to other regions of Spain (the industrialized center of Asturias, Madrid, etc.) or to Europe (Germany, France, Belgium, Switzerland, etc.), giving rise to a progressive depopulation that still continues at present.

== Geography ==
=== Physical geography ===
Being located in the middle basin of the Navia River, the municipality of Boal is crossed by that river from south/south-east to north-east, where its course acts as a natural border with the neighboring municipality of Villayón. On its way through this municipality, the Navia River is dammed first in Doiras, and later, downstream, by that of Arbón, already located in Villayón. Two noticeable tributaries pouring their water on the Navia River in the municipality of Boal are the Urubio River (in the reservoir of Doiras) and the Pendia River (in the reservoir of Arbón).

The main elevation of the terrain is located already bordering with the municipalities of Illano and Castropol: it is the range of La Bobia, of 1,201 m above sea level. There are also La Cristaleira (1,036 m) in the southern area of the municipality, Pena Queimada (921 m) in the north-western area, Penouta (899 m) in the northern zone (from there it is possible to see a wide panoramic view of the coast from the municipality of Navia to the environs of Foz, in the province of Lugo) and Penácaros (732 m) in the central area. The capital town of the municipality is located relatively far away from the main valley of the Navia River, in the headwaters of the Pendia River and surrounded by the three aforementioned mountains, at about 450 m above sea level.

=== Civil parishes ===
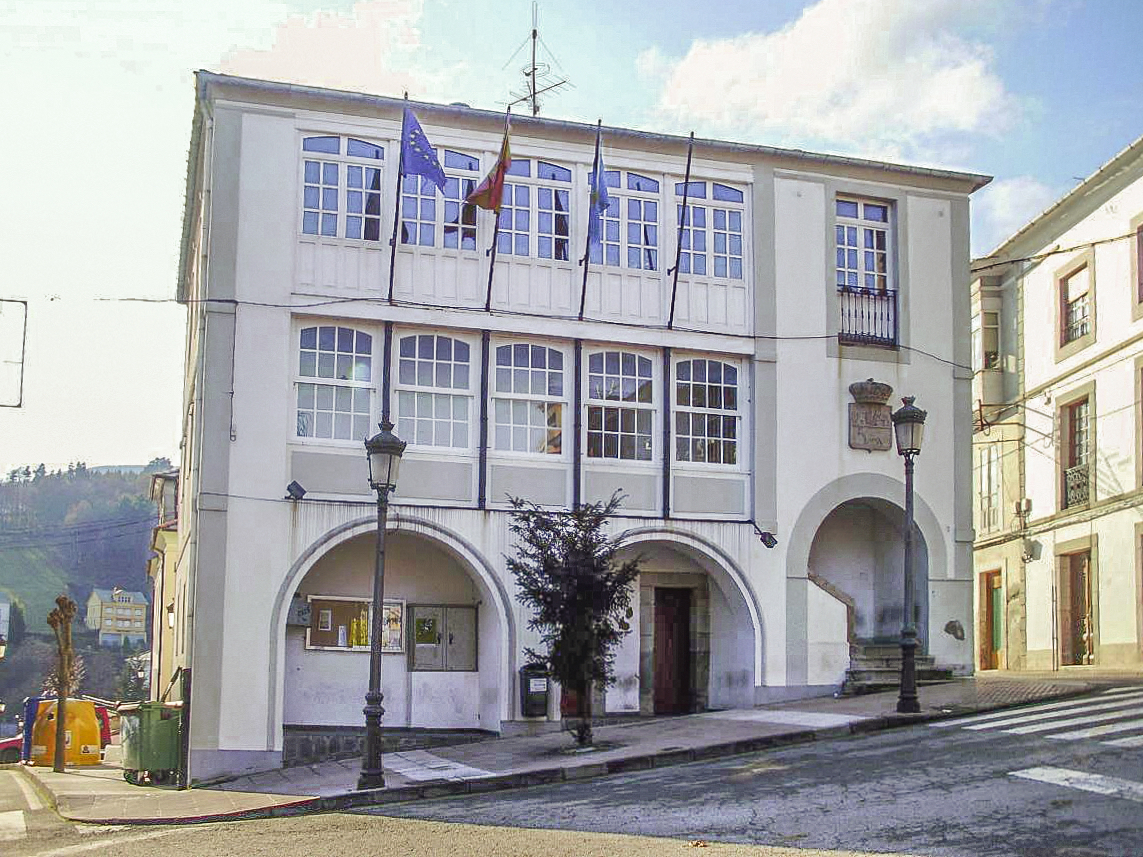
Town Hall of Boal

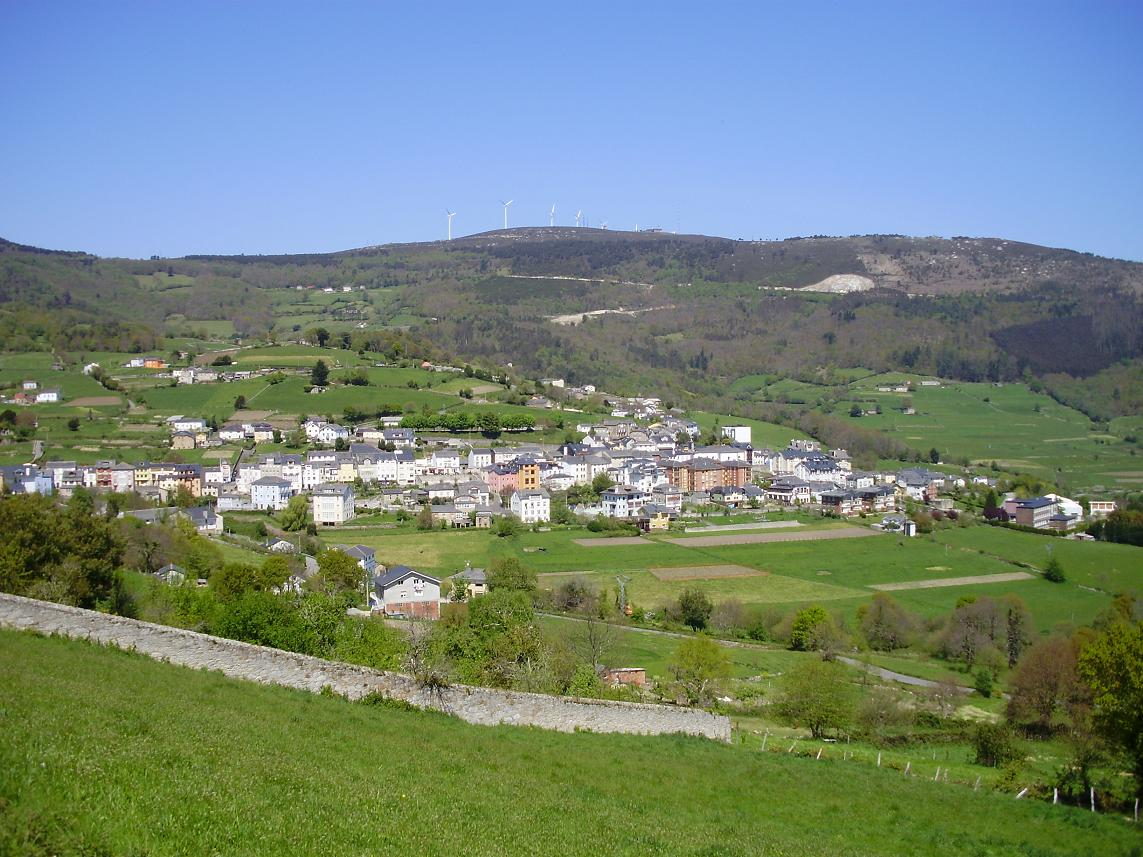
General view of Boal.

The municipality of Boal is divided in 7 civil parishes:

- Boal (in Eonavian: Bual): 966 inhabitants.
- Castrillón (in Eonavian: Castriyón): 182 inhabitants.
- Doiras: 153 inhabitants.
- Lebredo (in Eonavian: Llebredo): 13 inhabitants.
- La Ronda (in Eonavian: A Ronda): 63 inhabitants.
- Rozadas: 176 inhabitants.
- Serandinas (in Eonavian: Serandías): 223 inhabitants.

(Source: INE)

=== Main populated places ===
- Boal: 526 inhabitants.
- Armal: 154 inhabitants.
- Doiras: 98 inhabitants.
- Miñagón: 94 inhabitants.
- Rozadas: 79 inhabitants.
- Serandinas: 69 inhabitants.
- Prelo: 61 inhabitants.
- Los Mazos: 49 inhabitants.
- Sampol: 41 inhabitants.
- Castrillón: 39 inhabitants.

(Source: INE)

=== Parish of Boal ===
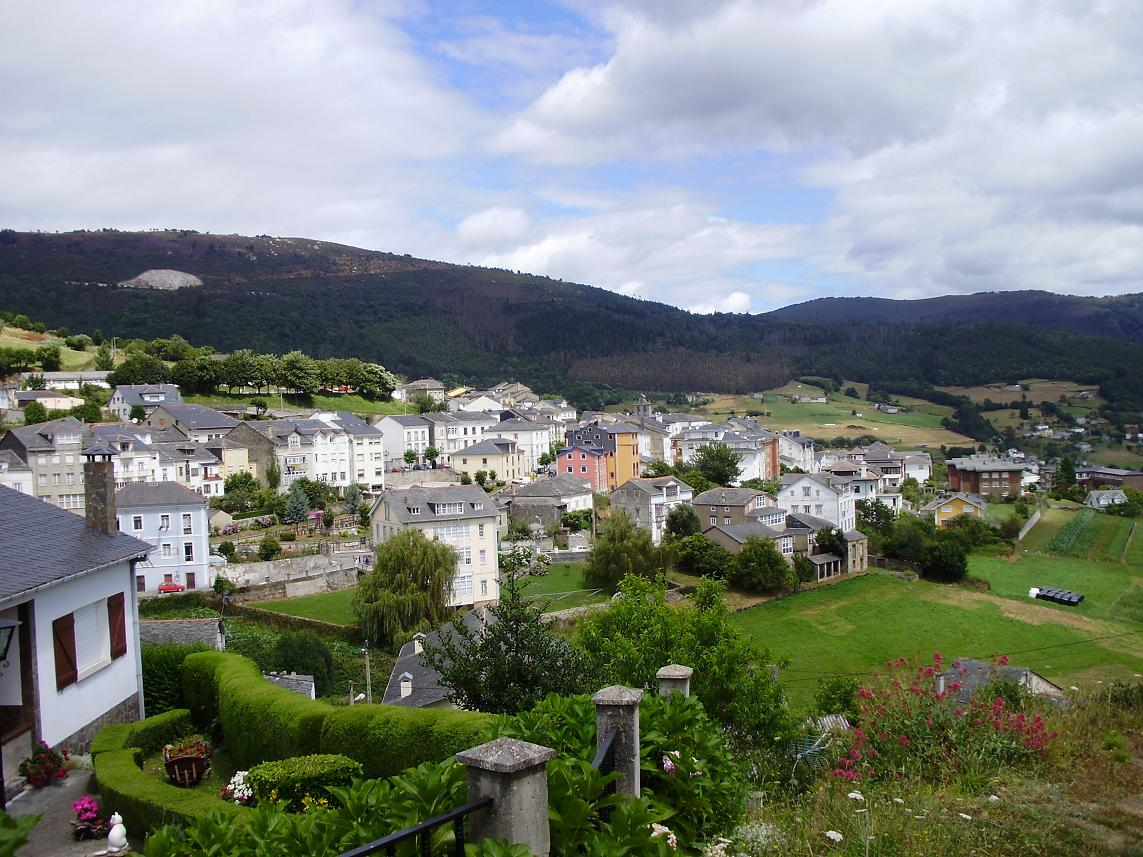
Partial view of Boal.

The parish of Boal is 25.93 km^{2} (10.01 sq mi) in size with a population of 1,137 (INE 2007).

The town of Boal is the head of the civil parish and also the capital of the homonymous municipality. It is located in the south-eastern mountainside of the Penouta range near the headwaters of the Pendia River, at about 450 m above sea level. It has a population of 588 inhabitants, they being distributed among the three main districts which the town consists of:

- Boal de Arriba (Upper Boal) is the historical nucleus of the village, with narrow streets (Alonso Rodríguez Street and Buenos Aires Avenue) where the older houses are located, together with the fairground that hosts the cattle market, and the cemetery.
- Zona central (Central area) includes the Plaza de la Iglesia (Church Square), where the parish church devoted to Santiago Apóstol is located, the Plaza del Ayuntamiento (Town Hall Square) and the Asturias Avenue, where the Casa de Cultura (House of Culture) that hosts the municipal library, and most of the shops and bars, restaurants and hotels are located. The area also includes the Everardo Villamil Street and the Republic of Cuba Avenue.
- Boal de Abajo (Lower Boal) has grown along the AS-12 road (Melquiades Álvarez Street and Isidoro Fontana Street) and the Rosalía de la Cruz Street, hosting some examples of the architecture of the emigrants who had made fortune in the Americas; among which are the Casa de Damiana (1919) and, already on the road out of the village in direction to Grandas de Salime, the Villa Anita (1926), decorated with glazed tiles in all of its façades. Moreover, the elementary school (Escuelas Graduadas, now called Centro Público de Educación Básica Carlos Bousoño) and the high school, together with the municipal sports center and pool are located in the area.

==== Villages of the parish of Boal ====
- Armal
- Boal
- Capareirín
- Capareiro
- El Caleyo
- El Serredo
- Estalello
- Ferradal
- La Barreira
- La Cámara
- La Pelame
- Langrave
- Las Cabanas
- Las Viñas
- Llaviada
- Los Navalíos
- Los Mazos
- Meróu
- Peirones
- Pendia
- Penouta
- Piedra Blanca
- Prelo
- Reboqueira
- Riomayor
- Rodella
- Rozas
- San Luis

== Demography ==
Evolution of the population in the municipality of Boal since 1842 (Source: INE)

During the first decades of the 19th century, the municipality of Boal kept a slow increase of population that was accelerated with the construction of the dam of Doiras in 1930, reaching in that year its historical maximum of 7,365 inhabitants. The high levels of population remained until 1960, due to the dam, the tungsten mining near Penouta and the existence of traditional agriculture, which required a lot of labor. Because of this, the municipality of Boal could be once the most populous one in the middle course of the Navia River. Nevertheless, from 1960 on, due to the closing of mines and to the changes experienced by the traditional agriculture, a very important migratory flow started.

Emigration has marked the municipality in different ways. By the end of the 19th century and the beginning of the 20th century, the migratory flow went overseas to the Americas, especially to Argentina and Cuba, where emigrants kept their influence in the municipality. This was proven by the very important money transferences they made which allowed the construction of different buildings, as well as their promoting of the education of the remaining youth in Boal. The flow of money was interrupted by the Cuban Revolution.

By the middle of the 20th century, emigration started again, but it was directed to different destinations: to the centre of Europe, France, Germany, and also to the main industrial towns and cities of Asturias, especially Gijón and Avilés, etc.

Emigration has brought a dramatic change in the demographic figure of the municipality, to the point that, at present people over 60 years old constitute up to 42.7% of the total population, whereas people below 20 years old represent just as low as 8.4%.

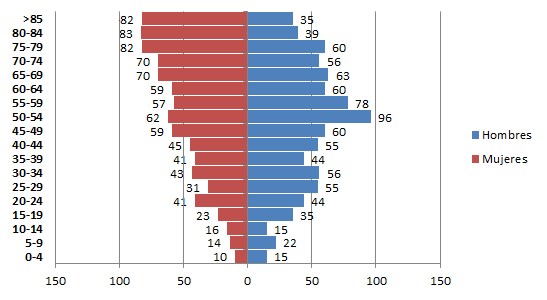
Pirámide demográfica de Boal (2013)

(Source: INE)

== Economy ==
Although the percentage of workers is a majority in the service sector (see table), its weight is quite lower than the regional mean, and it is not crazy to state that still at present, economy in Boal is based to a large extent on cattle farming, which employs almost one third of the working population, and is mainly destined to milk production, being Boal the main producer among the western municipalities in Asturias.

In recent years apiculture has experienced a noticeable growth, becoming honey one of the most typical products in the municipality. In spite of this, this activity is usually in a secondary place, constituting an extra-earnings source for many families, but not the main one. Nevertheless, the famous Feria de la Miel (Honey Fair) is a proof of the importance of apiculture for the municipality. Moreover, a few years ago it started working the company Boal Apícola, which markets about 20 tons of honey a year.

Workers in the different economic sectors (year 2011)
	Number of workers	Percentage
TOTAL	458	100
Agriculture, cattle farming and fishing	134	29,26
Industry	16	3,49
Construction	30	6,55
Service sector	298	65,06
*Data took from the Anuario Estadístico de Asturias 2011, SADEI

Uses of the terrain in the municipality (year 2011)
Uses	Area (km²)
Farming land	0,99
Meadows and pastures	30,51
Forest	55,90
Other uses (industrial, residential, etc...)	32,88
*Data took from the Anuario Estadístico de Asturias 2011, SADEI

== Politics ==
The political party that has been ruling during more time in the municipality of Boal since 1979 has been the PSOE.

Municipality elections
Party	1979	1983	1987	1991	1995	1999	2003	2007	2011
PSOE	3	5	6	5	4	6	5	5	4
CD / AP / PP	0	4	3	4	5	4	4	4	2
FAC									2
PCE / IU-BA	2	1	1	1	2	1	2	2	1
UCD / CDS	6	1	1	1					
Total	11	11	11	11	11	11	11	11	9

== Gastronomy ==
In the mainly agricultural and farming municipality are some natural products, among which are vegetables, beans and potatoes. Thus, Boal’s traditional cooking makes use of all those resources to have among its most typical dishes the stock with "cimois" (rapini) or collard greens.

Since this municipality rich in meat, such as veal, pork, kid, lamb and mutton, etc., other dishes such as the meat or sausages pie, the lacón with rapini and "cachelos" (pieces of cooked potato) or the corn "rapa" (similar to a pie but using corn and bacon) have a prominent place too. Game constitutes another important chapter in Boal’s cooking, being frequent pieces such as roe deer and wild boar, apart from partridge, Eurasian woodcock and hare.

Examples of sweets and pastry are "cocadas", "venera" (a kind of almond-based marzipan) and "cereixolos". Moreover, honey has a huge variety of applications on the local cooking. Additionally, it is possible in Boal to enjoy the rest of asturian typical dishes.

== Tourism ==
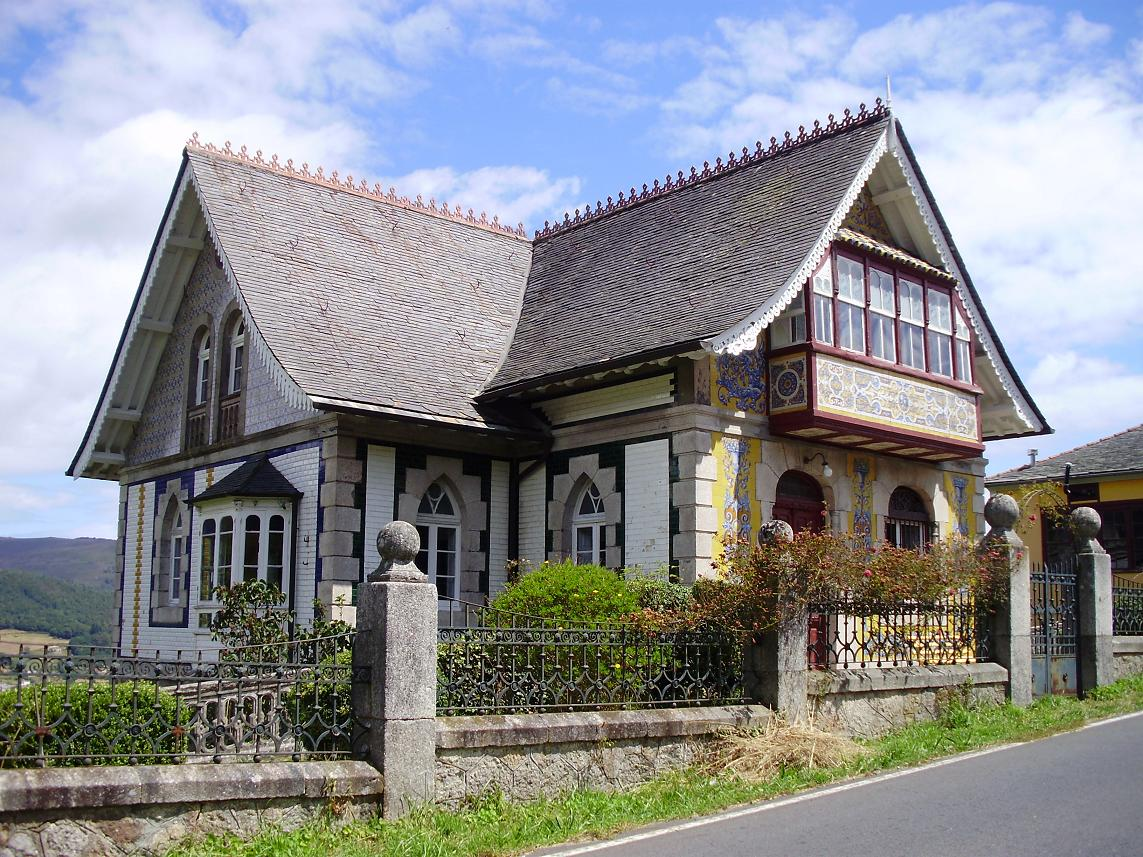
Front façade of Villa Anita.

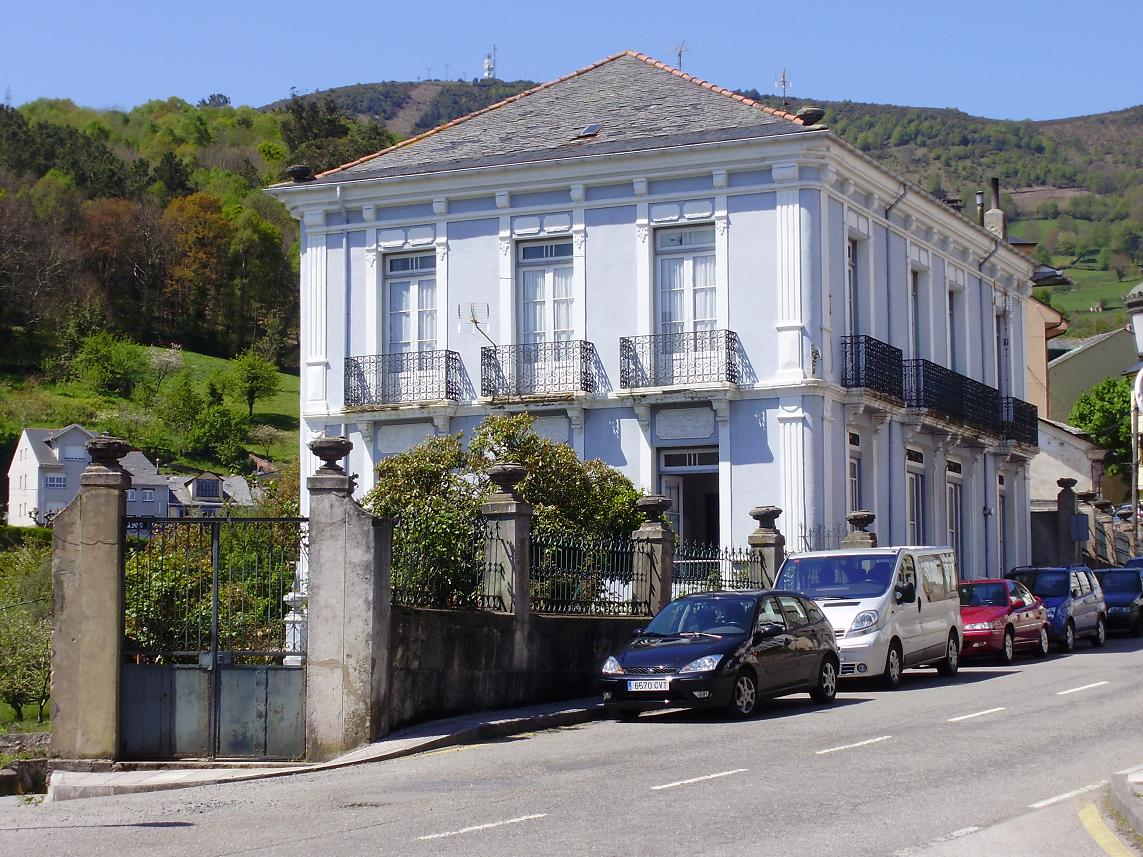
Front façade of Villa Damiana.

The most ancient signs in the municipality are the cave paintings in the Cova del Demo. They are male, female and zoomorphic paintings. Different architectural examples include palaces, large houses and churches, among which are the following:

- The Miranda Palace in Prelo, built during the 15th and 16th centuries and declared "well of cultural interest" in 1982. At first it consisted in a square tower with three floors that was subsequently extended. It had small openings that were later enlarged. The main body of the palace has two floors in the back side and one floor in the front side, due to the unevenness of the terrain. Above the entrance door it is placed a big coat of arms belonging to the family González de Prelo y Castrillón. Between the tower and the chapel there is an extra body, with corridors supported by stone columns. The chapel dates from 1776, having rectangle floor with two loopholes in both wings, and two Rococo-inspired altarpieces painted in black and white. The wooden sculptures from the 17th and 18th centuries were removed because of the bad situation of the ceiling.
- The Berdín Palace in Doiras, from the 18th century, which attracts the attention because of its great size and its walls without any kind of decoration. It is constructed with masonry, with blocks of stone. Its floor has a U shape, and in the façade of the central courtyard there is a gallery above monolithic columns.

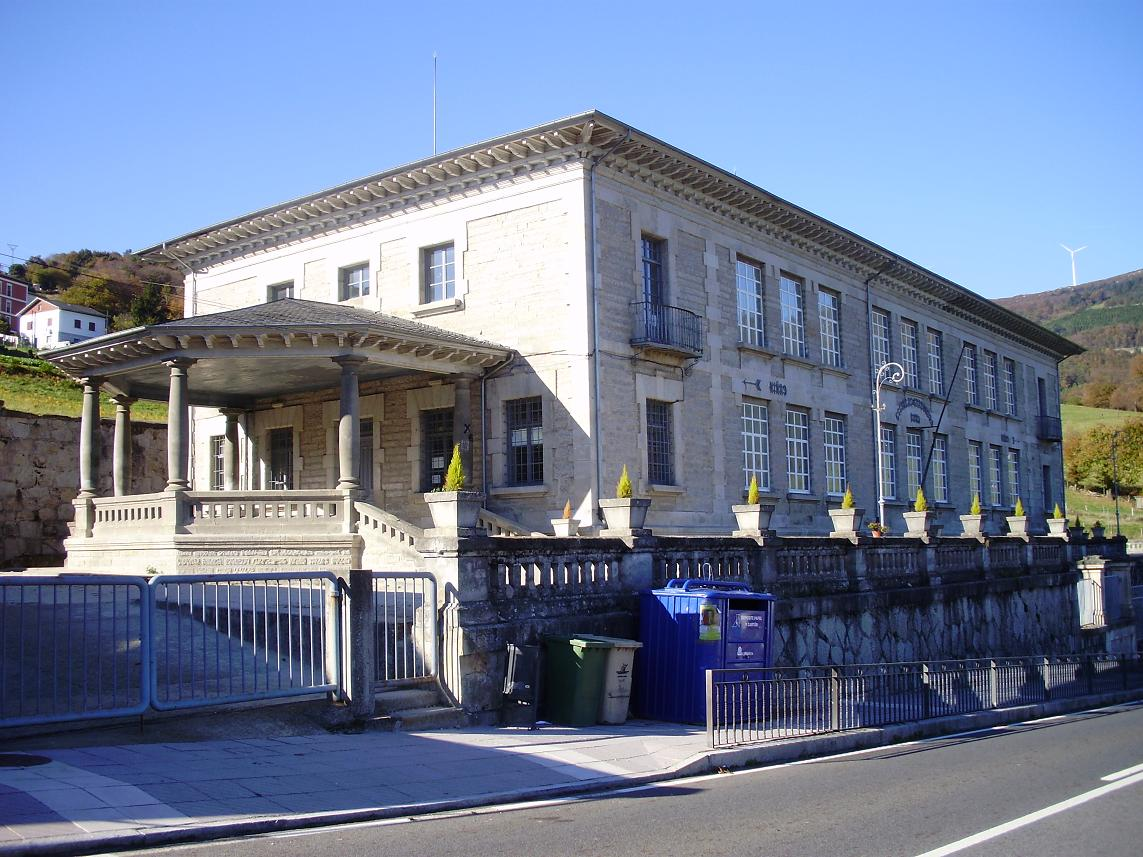
Building of the elementary school "Escuelas Graduadas".

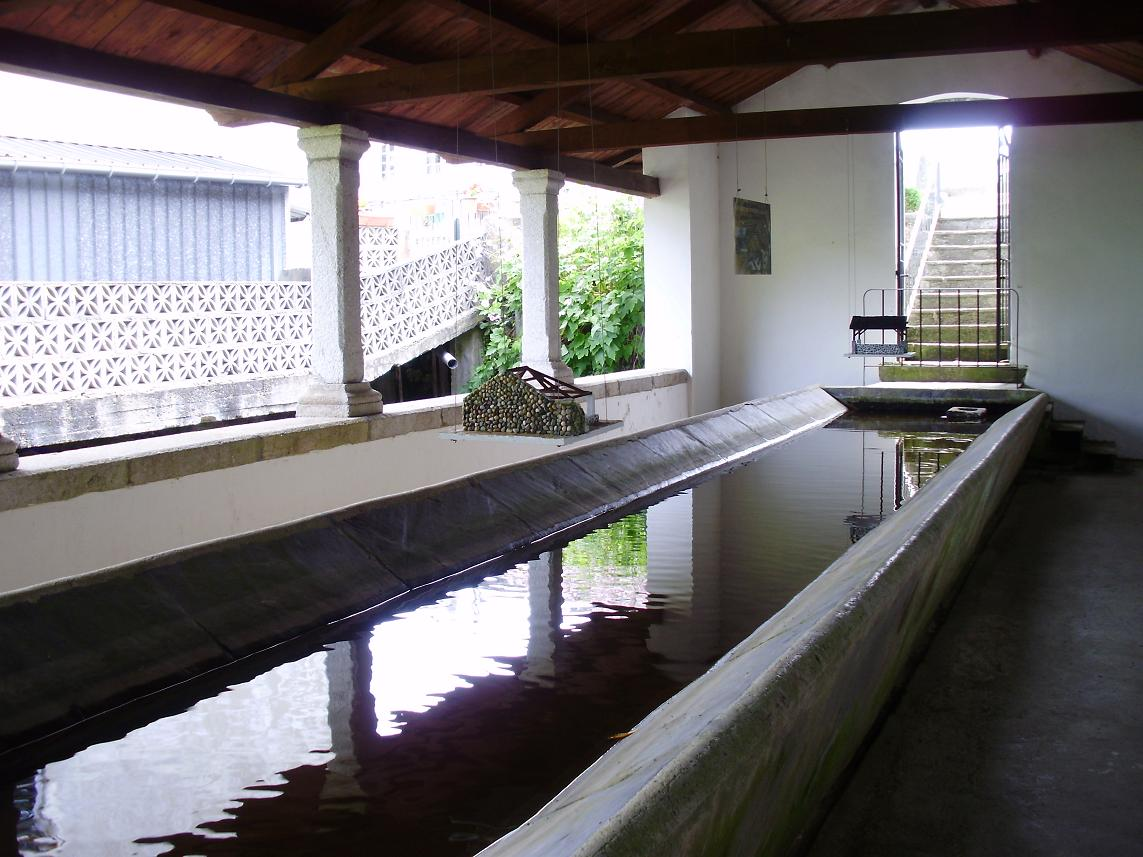
Inside of the public Washing House of Boal

- The Palace of Armal, with the typical structure of the rural large houses: rectangular floor, built with masonry and slate, and having very little decoration.
- Villa Anita: it was built in 1926 by an emigrant to Cuba. It is a villa consisting of a T-shaped floor with three floors. The villa has English influences, together with Japanese influences and others from the Middle Ages. The façade is decorated with white ceramics (glazed tiles from Talavera) on its wings, having the main façade plant patterns. There is a glazed balcony on the first floor. The roof has two wings and it is covered with slate, and over the eaves it has some wooden decoration made of cut borders. The inside is as rich and well-preserved as the outside.
- Villa Damiana, built in 1919, is also a wonderful example of the historically-inspired architecture.
- Old Elementary School "Escuelas Graduadas" in Boal: this school was built between 1930 and 1934, promoted as other public works in the municipality by the "Sociedad de Instrucción Naturales del Concejo de Boal", founded in La Habana, Cuba (this was due to the high number of emigrants from Boal who had gone to that country in search of fortune) although it had also money contribution from the state and from emigrants in Buenos Aires. It is a great building constructed with stone, with large windows and two entrances framed by big porchs, because boys entered by one wing whereas girls entered by the opposite one. All the roofs have big wooden eaves.
- The Church of Santiago Apóstol in Boal, built between 1831 and 1837, with a Latin cross-shaped floor and a lateral porch built of granitic blocks of stone.
- The public Washing House in Boal, built thanks to the money sent by emigrants to the Americas and inaugurated in 1928. It has been recently restored and transformed into the Center for the Interpretation of the Washing Houses in the municipality of Boal. The building exhibits an important constructive wealth with a functional style, having mouldings and pinnacles, and it is a good example of the charitable anxiety for their native villages and for the poorest people of the returning emigrants.
- Casa de la Apicultura is an apiculture museum.

== Festivities ==
The municipality of Boal hosts a number of festivities and fairs. Among the most important ones include:

- On May 15: the feast in honor of San Isidro which is held close to its hermitage in the mountain near the Penouta range.
- On June 13 and 14: the feast in honor of San Antonio in Armal.
- On July 24, 25 and 26: the feast in honor of Santiago Apóstol, in Boal. On July 21 and 22, the feast in honor of the Virgen de la Magdalena in Doiras.
- On August 25: the feast in honor of San Luis in the homonym village.
- In October/November: the Feria de la Miel (Honey Fair) at the last weekend of October or the first one of November.

A fortnightly market takes place in Boal, hosted on every alternate Mondays. In addition, there are also several cattle markets during the year. Two of them are hosted in the fairground of Boal on the second Saturday of October and on the last one of April, and other two are hosted in the La Bobia range: on May 29, that of San Fernando and on June 26 that of San Pelayo.

== People from Boal ==
- Celestino Álvarez, writer and journalist immigrated to Cuba.
- Carlos Bousoño, poet and literary critic.

== See also ==
- Castrillón (Boal)
- List of municipalities in Asturias
