= Ronda (disambiguation) =

Ronda is a city in the Spanish province of Málaga.

Ronda may also refer to:

== In geography ==
- Ronda, Cebu, Philippines
- Ronda (Illano), Illano, Asturias, Spain
- Ronda, California, United States
- Ronda, North Carolina, United States
- Ronda, West Virginia, United States
- Camí de Ronda, a footpath in Catalonia, Spain
- Ronda Alta, Rio Grande do Sul, Brazil
- A Ronda (Boal), Boal, Asturias, Spain
- La Ronda (estate), Bryn Mawr, Pennsylvania, U.S.

== Other uses ==
- Ronda (tango), line of dance in Argentine tango
- Ronda (samba-canção), song composed by Paulo Vanzolini and interpreted by Inezita Barroso
- La Ronda (magazine), literary magazine published in Rome between 1919 and 1923
- SEAT Ronda, a small family car produced by the Spanish automaker SEAT
- Ronda (watchmaker), a Swiss manufacturer of watch movements

== People with the given name Ronda ==
- Ronda Boller, American politician
- Ronda Curtin (born 1980), American college ice hockey player
- Ronda Jo Miller (born 1978), American deaf basketball and volleyball player
- Ronda Rousey (born 1987), American judoka and mixed martial artist
- Ronda Rudd Menlove, American politician and university administrator
- Ronda Storms (born 1965), member of the U.S. state Senate of Florida
- Ronda Stryker (born 1954), American billionaire heiress

== See also ==
- Rhonda, given name
- Rhondda (disambiguation)
- Assembly of Ronda
- CD Ronda
- Depression of Ronda
- Plaza de Toros de Ronda
- Ronda Campesina
- Ronda de Sant Pere, Barcelona
- Ronda del Guinardó, Barcelona
- Sella Ronda
- Serranía de Ronda
- Taifa of Ronda
