= A Ronda =

A Ronda may refer to:

- A Ronda (Boal), a parish in the municipality Boal, Asturias, Spain
- A Ronda (Eilao), a parish in the municipality Illano, Asturias, Spain

== See also ==
- La Ronda (estate), a mansion and estate in Bryn Mawr, Pennsylvania
