= Castrillon (disambiguation) =

Castrillón is a municipality in Asturias, Spain.

Castrillon may also refer to:

== People ==
- Castrillón (surname)

== Other uses ==
- Castrillón (Boal), a civil parish in Asturias, Spain
