= Illano =

Illano Eilao (Eonavian)
- Municipality
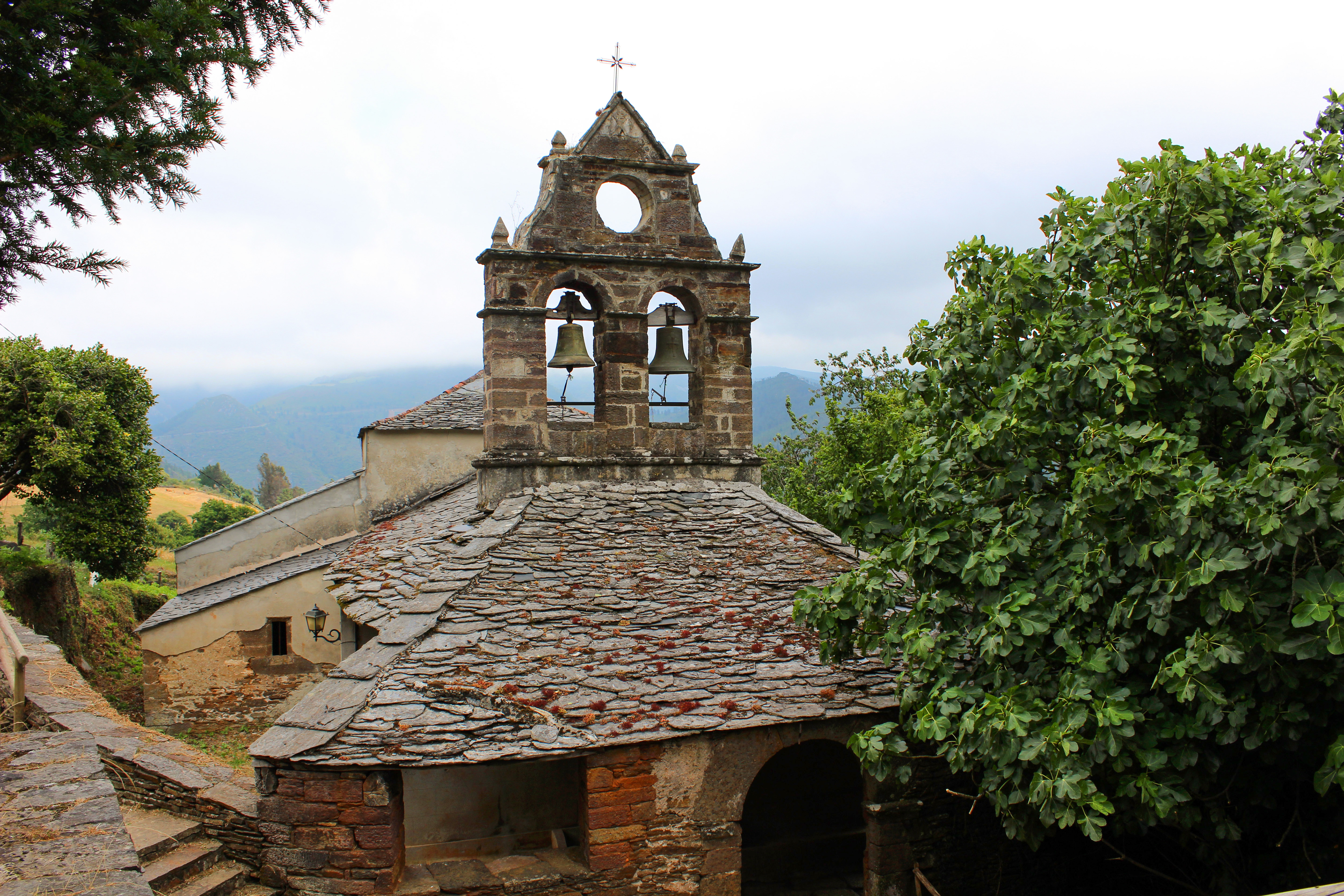

- Coat of arms

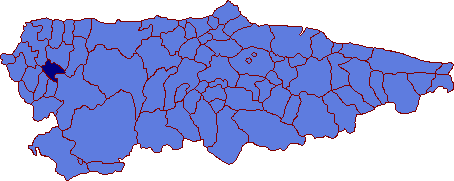

- Location in Spain
- Coordinates: 43°18′N 6°48′W
- Country: Spain
- Autonomous community: Asturias
- Province: Asturias
- Comarca: Eo-Navia
- Judicial district: Valdés
- Capital: Illano

Government
  - Alcalde: Leandro López Fernández (PSOE)

Area
  - Total: 102.46 km^{2} (39.56 sq mi)
- Highest elevation: 1,136 m (3,727 ft)

Population (2025-01-01)
  - Total: 277
  - Density: 2.70/km^{2} (7.00/sq mi)
- Time zone: UTC+1 (CET)
  - Summer (DST): UTC+2 (CEST)
- Postal code: 33734

Illano (Eonavian: Eilao) is a municipality in the autonomous community of Asturias in Spain. It is bordered on the north by Boal, on the south by San Martín de Oscos, on the east by Boal, Villayón and Allande, and on the west by Villanueva de Oscos and Castropol.

== Parishes ==
- Bullaso
- Gío
- Herías
- Illano
- Ronda

== Demographics ==
Historical population

Year	Pop.	±%
1842	2,263	—
1857	1,809	−20.1%
1877	1,734	−4.1%
1887	1,861	+7.3%
1900	1,681	−9.7%
1910	1,634	−2.8%
1920	1,618	−1.0%
1930	1,688	+4.3%
1940	1,683	−0.3%

Year	Pop.	±%
1950	1,665	−1.1%
1960	2,189	+31.5%
1970	1,631	−25.5%
1981	1,020	−37.5%
1991	779	−23.6%
2001	618	−20.7%
2011	444	−28.2%
2021	320	−27.9%

Source: INE

== See also ==
- List of municipalities in Asturias
