= Castropol (parish) =

Castropol Parish
- Parish
- Location within Spain
- Coordinates: 43.533333°N 7.033333°W
- Country: Spain
- Autonomous community: Asturias
- Province: Asturias
- Municipality: Castropol

Castropol is one of nine parishes (administrative divisions) in the Castropol municipality, within the province and autonomous community of Asturias, in northern Spain.

The population is 540 (INE 2005).

== Geography ==
The parish sits at a border in the Eo-Navia.
