= Berdín Palace =

Palace located in Spain

Coordinates: 43.3915°N 6.8231°W

The Berdín Palace (Spanish: Palacio de Berdín; Galician: Pazo de Berdín) is located in the village of Doiras, in Boal, Asturias, Spain.

Built in the 18th century, it attracts the attention because of its great size and its walls without any kind of decoration. It is constructed with masonry, with blocks of stone. Its floor has a U shape, and in the façade of the central courtyard there is a gallery above monolithic columns.
