= Oneta, Spain =

Parish (parroquia) in Villayón, Asturias, Spain

Oneta
- Parish
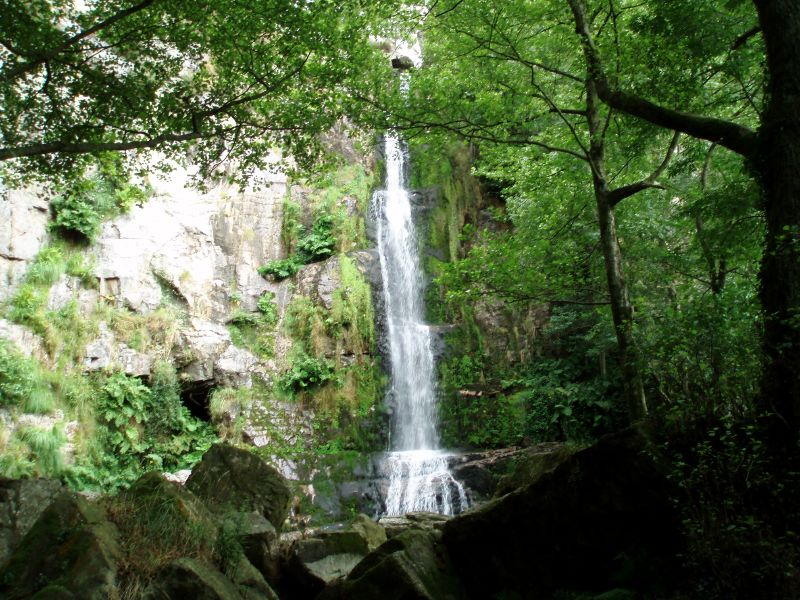
- The Oneta Falls

- Villayón in Asturias
- Coordinates: 43.46455°N 6.66855°W
- Country: Spain
- Community: Asturias
- Comarca: Eo-Navia
- Municipality: Villayón

Area
  - Total: 9.84 km^{2} (3.80 sq mi)
- Elevation: 542 m (1,778 ft)

Population (2007)
  - Total: 135
  - Density: 13.7/km^{2} (35.5/sq mi)

Oneta is one of 6 parishes in the municipality of Villayón, in Asturias, Spain.

== Overview ==
Oneta is a village with 135 inhabitants (2007) and an area of 9.84 square kilometres (3.80 sq mi) and an altitude of 542 metres (1,778 ft). The village is 6 kilometres (3.7 mi) from the municipal capital Villayón. Smaller villages in the Parish include Oneta (2007: population 77), Brañuas (Vaqueiros; 2007: population 44) and Linera (2007: population 14). The nearest airport is Asturias Airport.

The River Brana flows through the village and Oneta is home to the Cascada de Oneta waterfall. Agriculture dominates the region and has for hundreds of years. Warm summers and mild, occasionally hard winters. Autumn is characterized by severe storms.
