= Coromines =

Coromines is a Spanish surname that may refer to

- Joan Coromines (1905–1997), Spanish linguist
- Jordi Guixé i Coromines (born 1970), Spanish historian
- Pere Coromines i Montanya (1870–1939), Spanish writer, politician, and economist

== See also ==
- Corominas
