= Tuxpan, Jalisco =

Tuxpan
- Municipality and town
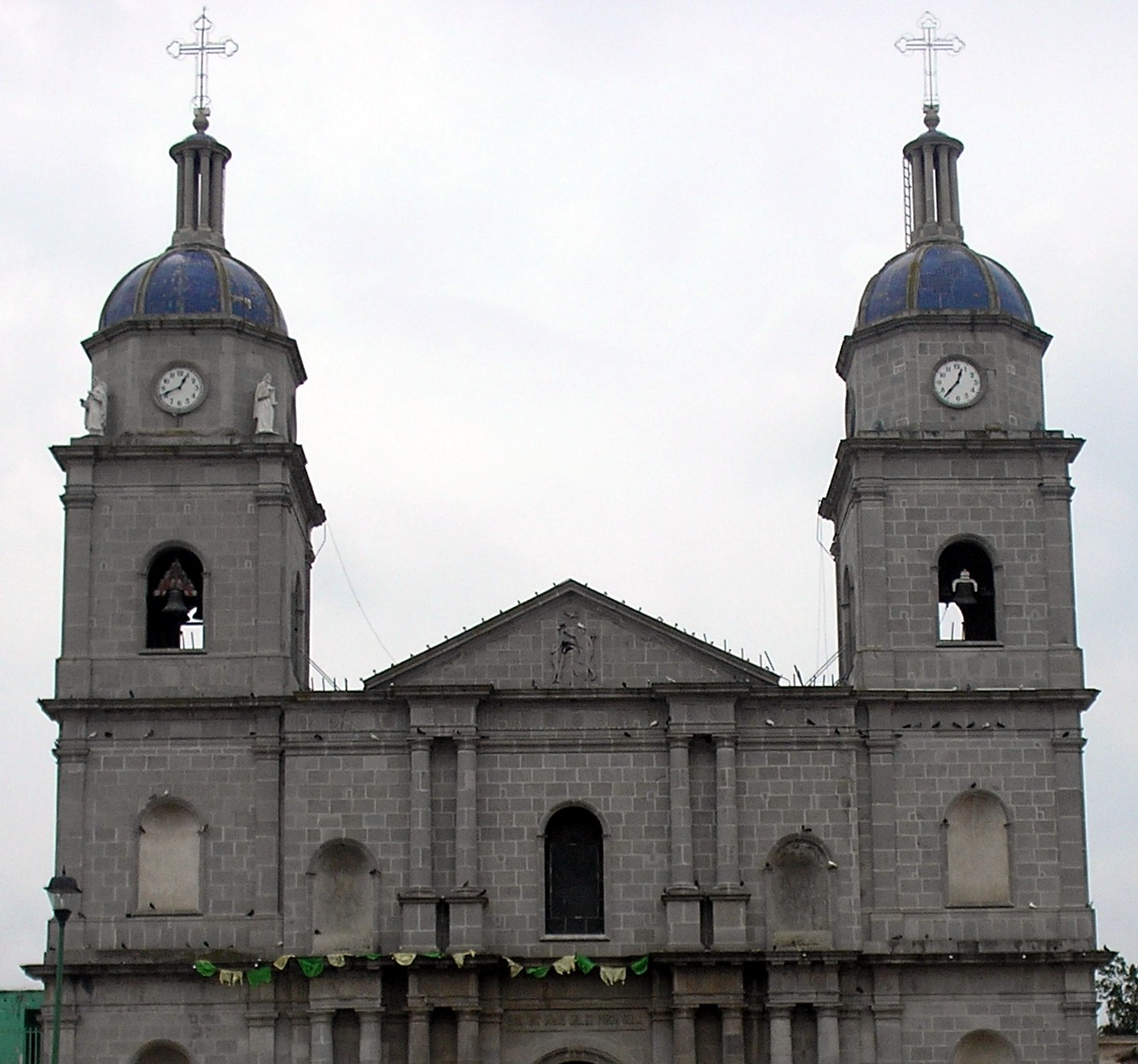
- Tuxpan's main Catholic Church

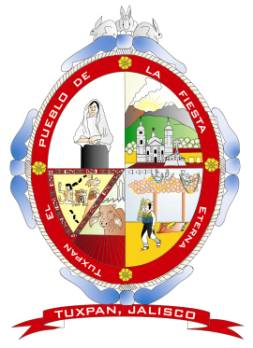
- Coat of arms

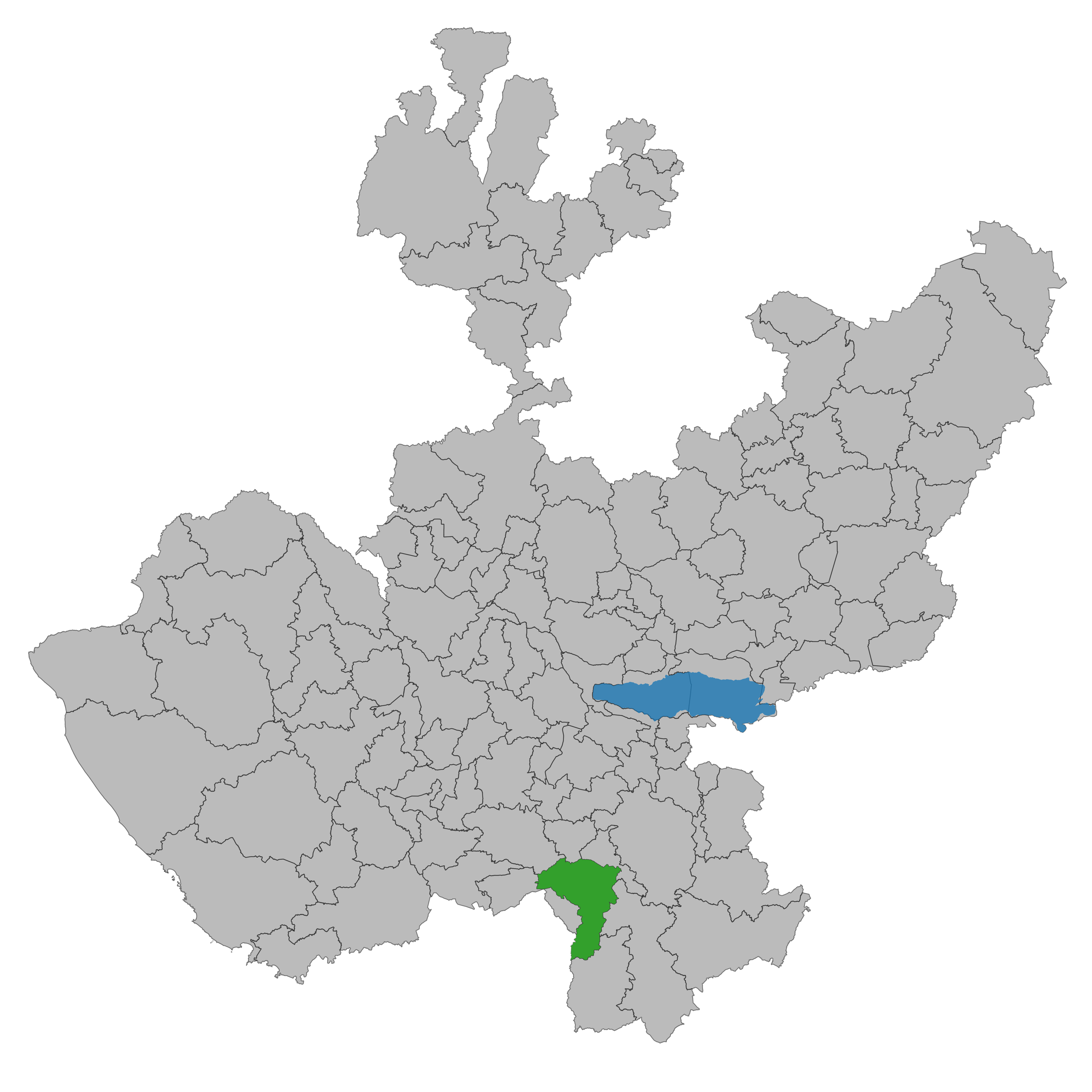
- Location of the municipality in Jalisco

- Location in Mexico
- Coordinates: 19°33′14″N 103°22′32″W
- Country: Mexico
- State: Jalisco

Area
  - Total: 725.5 km^{2} (280.1 sq mi)
  - Town: 6.47 km^{2} (2.50 sq mi)

Population (2020 census)
  - Total: 37,518
  - Density: 51.71/km^{2} (133.9/sq mi)
  - Town: 30,471
  - Town density: 4,710/km^{2} (12,200/sq mi)
- Time zone: UTC-6 (Central Standard Time)

Tuxpan is a town and municipality in Jalisco, Mexico.

== Etymology ==
The name "Tuxpan" comes from the Nahuatl word tochpan, a word used to describe where rabbits live or possibly place of abundant rabbits. Some others translate it as a location above the river.

== Geography ==
Tuxpan is located in the southern part of the state of Jalisco, between coordinates 19 13" 11' north latitude between 103 18" 17' with average height of 1,900 m above sea level. The average annual temperature is 21 C, the maximum average of 30 C and the minimum of 13 C. Within the terrain of the hill town highlights of Cihuapilli with 1724 masl. The Tuxpan River (known locally as Tizatirla) crosses the town.

== History ==
In 1529, the Spanish conquerors came to the land under the commands of Francisco Cortés de San Buenaventura, nephew of Hernán Cortés. However, the Franciscan friars founded the village in 1536, noting the trace and built a convent in that year dedicated to San Juan Bautista. Later, an eight-sided cross was built with a based quadrangular. It is currently the oldest colonial monument of Jalisco. According to historical records of local monographs, Tuxpan was founded by the Toltec pilgrimage in the year 1642 of our era.

=== Important Dates ===
- 1897 – July 17. Inauguration of drinking water service, carried "port of Mount" to the square of San Sebastian.
- 1905 – July 18. Service facilities- National Telegraph.
- 1905 – October 23. Local mobilized train arrived with firewood.
- 1908 – March. The first public telephone comes into operation.
- 1908 – December 1. Mexican Pacific Railroad makes its arrival with the first step to Colima.
- 1910 – September 16. Inauguration of the kiosk in the main square replaced the water source from the hill Cihuapilli.
- 1910 – October. The first service power plant was created from gas.
- 1911 – July. The administration established the first post.
- 1913 – January 20. The Volcano of Colima erupts.
- 1923 – July 10. Inauguration of electric service was provided by the firm of J. Trinidad Ochoa.
- 1926 – July 13. Drinking water was pumped from the springs of Tizate.
- 1927 – July 27. First cinema hall called "Red Lounge".
- 1941 – April 15. The village was almost destroyed by a strong earthquake.
- 1953 – November 14. Operation of the high schools start by federal Miguel Hidalgo.

== Localities ==
The municipality of Tuxpan has 92 localities. Being the most populated:

- Platanar
- San Juan de Espanatica
- Atenquique
- Padilla
- Rancho Niño
- San Miguel el Alto
- Los Laureles
- Poblado Nuevo
- 21 de Noviembre
- Los Mazos
- Las Canoas
- Agosto
- Pozo Santo
- Montelongo, Jalisco
- San Mames, Jalisco
- Paso de San Juan
- El Taracon
- Buen País

== Gastronomy ==
=== Cuaxala ===
This dish is a kind of salty atole, a thick soup with a doughy consistency that is cooked in chicken soup, guajillo chilies, tomatoes, lard or oil, and fresh oregano. Added on top is shredded chicken meat, it is served in a mud bowl (similar to clay). It is an exquisite meal that is served especially for lunch.

=== Frijoles güeros ===
Commonly made during Mexico's Easter week (during Lent), the dish is prepared with the following ingredients: white beans, cilantro, Guajillo chiles, onions, garlic, and cloves. Once cooked, it is served with a tortilla, folded into four parts.

=== "Tacos de la estacion" Literally Tacos from the (train) station, also known as Tuxpan's Tacos) ===
Tuxpan is well known for its tacos that are often sold at the railroad station, during the height of national train travel, Tuxpan was a stop between Colima and Mexico City where many passengers would buy these tacos. Today they are sold at the side of the station and down the street V. Carranza. These tacos consist of a corn tortilla made by hand that is covered by a sauce and stuffed with a piece of beef and pork cooked with spices, or it may be made with beans or potatoes.

== Sources ==
- Periódico La Voz de Tuxpan, Special Edition
- Periódico "La Voz de Tuxpan" Special Edition y Lameiras, OLvera, José. 1990.
- El Tuxpan de Jalisco.
- Una identidad danzante. El Colegio de MIchoacán A.C. Zamora, Mich. Mexico
