= Labiarón =

Labiarón is one of four parishes (administrative divisions) in San Martín de Oscos, a municipality within the province and autonomous community of Asturias, in northern Spain.

It is 16.59 km^{2} (6.41 sq mi) in size, with a population of 84 (INE 2006).

== Villages and hamlets ==
- Libiarón (Libiaróu)
- Piorno (43.316667°N 6.933333°W)
- Sarcead (Sarciada)
- Solana (A Solá)
- Soutelo (43.3°N 6.916667°W)
- Testemuñas (Testimuñas)
- Villamea (Villamiá)
- Villarín de Piorno (Vilarín de Piorno)
- Villarpille (Vilarpille) (43.266667°N 6.916667°W)
