= Celestino Álvarez =

Celestino Álvarez González, writer and journalist born in the municipality of Boal, in the Principality of Asturias (Spain), was one of the most famous and most important figures in Cuba and the only emigrant from the Principality to receive the title of Hijo Predilecto de Asturias (Favourite Son of Asturias).

He was first President and, subsequently, President of Honor of the Sociedad de Instrucción Naturales del Concejo de Boal (Association for the Education Natives of the Municipality of Boal), and thus he played a fundamental role in the construction of schools in his native municipality, and started in Cuba a collection which later allowed to build the road between Villanueva and Boal.

Furthermore, in 1919, he established the monthly magazine "El Progreso de Asturias" (The Progress of Asturias), the most important one of the asturian emigration, which he would run until his death in 1957.
