= Casa de la Apicultura =

Beekeeping museum in Boal, Asturias, Spain

- Location: Boal, Asturias, Spain
- Coordinates: 43°26′05″N 6°47′44″W
- Website: http://www.boal.es/index.php?M1=3&M2=40&M3=27

The Casa de la Apicultura (translation: Beekeeping House) is a museum in Boal, Asturias, Spain. It is the home of a collection relating to apiculture, which is a traditional activity in this part of Asturias.

The museum is housed in a former rural school, built by the Sociedad de Instrucción Naturales del Concejo de Boal, a society founded in Havana, Cuba, in 1911. The school was built in the mid-1930s and restored for this new role. It has two purposes: a cultural focus, as well as training and information for the region's beekeepers. The collection and exhibits, cataloged and inventoried, are primarily concerned with traditional beekeeping. They are accompanied by a series of informational panels whose content includes text and photos taken from the book, Las abejas, la miel y la cera en la sociedad tradicional asturiana ("Bees, honey and wax in Asturian traditional society"), by Xuaco López Álvarez.
