= Balmonte =

- Parish
- Location within Spain
- Coordinates: 43.45°N 6.933333°W
- Country: Spain
- Autonomous community: Asturias
- Province: Asturias
- Municipality: Castropol

Balmonte is one of nine parishes (administrative divisions) in Castropol, a municipality within the province and autonomous community of Asturias, in northern Spain.

The population is 260 (INE 2005).
