= Rhonda =

Given name

Rhonda is a given name derived from Rhondda, which is a Welsh name. Notable people with the name include:

- Rhonda Adams (born 1971), American model and actress
- Rhonda Bates (born 1949), American actress
- Rhonda Belle Martin (1907–1957), American serial killer
- Rhonda Britten (born 1960), the founder of the Fearless Living Institute, speaker and bestselling author
- Rhonda Burchmore (born 1960), Australian entertainer
- Rhonda Byrne (born 1951), Australian television writer and producer
- Rhonda Cator (born 1966), retired badminton player from Australia
- Rhonda Cornum, Ph.D., M.D., captured during the Gulf War and molested by her Iraqi captors
- Rhonda Corvese, Toronto-based international independent curator
- Rhonda Faehn (born 1971), American college gymnastics coach and former college and elite gymnast
- Rhonda Fleming (1923–2020), American film and television actress
- Rhonda Galbally (born 1948), Australian, currently the Chair of the Royal Women's Hospital Melbourne
- Rhonda Ganz, Canadian poet and illustrator
- Rhonda Glenn, American sportscaster, author and a manager of communications for the United States Golf Association (USGA)
- Rhonda Gouge (b1955), Bluegrass musician
- Rhonda Harper, American surfer and surf coach
- Rhonda Jo Petty (born 1955), American pornographic actress
- Rhonda Keenum, lobbyist for The WIT Group and former Republican operative who worked for President George W. Bush
- Rhonda Kirkland, Canadian politician
- Rhonda Kramer, Los Angeles, United States, reporter
- Rhonda Paisley (born 1960), artist, author, and former politician from Northern Ireland
- Rhonda Pearlman, fictional character on the HBO drama The Wire, played by actress Deirdre Lovejoy
- Rhonda Rajsich (born 1978), American racquetball player
- Rhonda Roland Shearer, American sculptor, scholar and journalist
- Rhonda Rompola, the head women's basketball coach at SMU
- Rhonda Ross Kendrick (born 1971), American actress
- Rhonda Rucker, folk musician from Louisville, Kentucky
- Rhonda Shear (born 1954), American television personality, comedian, and actress
- Rhonda Sing (1961–2001), Canadian professional wrestler
- Rhonda Sivarajah, Minnesota Republican politician
- Rhonda Thorne (born 1958), former World No. 1 squash player from Australia
- Rhonda Vincent (born 1962), bluegrass singer, songwriter, mandolin player, guitarist and fiddle player
- Rhonda Volmer, fictional character in the HBO series Big Love
- Rhonda Watkins (born 1987), Trinidad and Tobago long jumper
- Rhonda Louise Williams (1957–2019), American social worker and survivor of Dean Corll
- Rhonda Wellington Lloyd, fictional character in the Nickelodeon television series Hey Arnold!
- Rhonda M. Williams (1957–2000), American economist and activist

== See also ==
- Ronda § People with the given name Ronda
- Rhondda § People with the given name Rhondda
- "Help Me, Rhonda", single by The Beach Boys
- Rhonda (trick 'r treat)
