= Ponticella =

Parish in Villayón, Asturias, Spain

- Interactive map of Ponticella
- Country: Spain
- Community: Asturias
- Comarca: Eo-Navia
- Municipality: Villayón

Area
  - Total: 54.15 km^{2} (20.91 sq mi)

Population
  - Total: 450
- Postal code: 33718

Ponticella (Spanish: Ponticiella) is one of six parishes in the municipality of Villayón, in Asturias, Spain.

== Geography ==
Villayón in Asturia

Ponticella is a Parroquia with 450 inhabitants, as of 2007, and an area of 53,16 km^{2}. It is at an elevation of 456 meters. The village is 14 km away from the capital Villayón.

=== Rivers and lakes ===
The Rivers Rio de Llouxeira and Rio Cabornel pass the Parroquia together with many smaller streams.

The (Waterfalls) Cascada de Méxica are found in this area.

=== Traffic ===
The area includes the next airport Oviedo.

== Economy ==
Agriculture has dominated the region for hundreds of years.

== Climate ==
Warm summers and smooth, seldom hard winters. In autumn strong storms are possible.

== Points of interest ==
- Castro de Illaso
- Cascada de Méxica

== Smaller villages in the Parroquia ==
- Auguamaroza 3 Hab. (2007) 43.35249°N 6.745°W
- Argolellas 11 Hab. (2007) 43.4096°N 6.72345°W
- Barandón 4 Hab. (2007) 43.3404°N 6.7553°W
- El Bedural 5 Hab. (2007) 43.40902°N 6.7197°W
- Busmayor 17 Hab. (2007) 43.37178°N 6.72591°W
- Bustalfoyao 17 Hab. (2007) 43.231396°N 6.422289°W
- A Candaosa 11 Hab. (2007) 43.224364°N 6.423580°W
- As Candaosas 14 Hab. (2007) 43.23331°N 6.451194°W
- Castaedo 23 Hab. (2007) 43.34863°N 6.75116°W
- El Couz 20 Hab. (2007) 43.3626°N 6.7409°W
- Iyaso 37 Hab. (2007) 43.224364°N 6.423580°W
- Llanteiro 5 Hab. (2007) 43.23688°N 6.432313°W
- Llouredo 26 Hab. (2007) 43.40239°N 6.74416°W
- Murias 6 Hab. (2007) 43.243885°N 6.435098°W
- Ponticella 54 Hab. (2007) 43.39368°N 6.74103°W
- Poxos 43.37067°N 6.74017°W
- Solares 16 Hab. (2007) 43.39019°N 6.75702°W
- Trabada 45 Hab. (2007) 43.40553°N 6.71835°W
- Valdedo 70 Hab. (2007)43.389°N 6.7372°W
- Valle 22 Hab. (2007) 43.39538°N 6.72269°W
