= Serandías =

- Parish
- Location within Spain
- Coordinates: 43.448611°N 6.746111°W
- Country: Spain
- Autonomous community: Asturias
- Province: Asturias
- Municipality: Boal

Serandías is one of seven parishes (administrative divisions) in Boal, a municipality, within the province and autonomous community of Asturias, in northern Spain.

It is 15.89 km^{2} (6.14 sq mi) in size with a population of 253 (INE 2008).

== Villages ==
- Cabanastrabazas
- Llanteiro
- Miñagón
- Teiciellos
- Villanova
- El Villar de Serandías
- Mezá
