= Eilao (parish) =

Illano Parish
- Parish
- Location within Spain
- Country: Spain
- Autonomous community: Asturias
- Province: Asturias
- Municipality: Illano

Eilao is one of five parishes in Illano, a municipality within the province and autonomous community of Asturias, in northern Spain.

It is 39.88 km^{2} (15.40 sq mi) in size. The population is 364. The postal code is 33734.

== Villages ==
- Cachafol
- Carbayal
- Cimadevilla
- Enterríos
- Eilao (capital)
- A Montaña
- Pastur
- Santesteba
- Vilar
- Vilaseca
- Zadamoño
