= Campos y Salave =

Coordinates: 43.55°N 6.883333°W

Campos y Salave is one of four parishes (administrative divisions) in Tapia de Casariego, a municipality within the province and autonomous community of Asturias, in northern Spain.
