= Villayón =

- Municipality
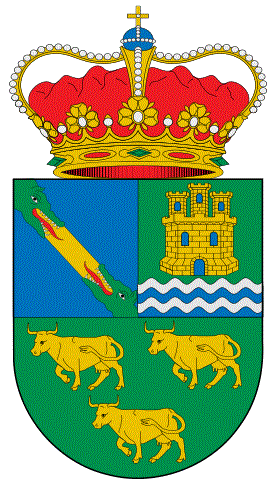
- Coat of arms

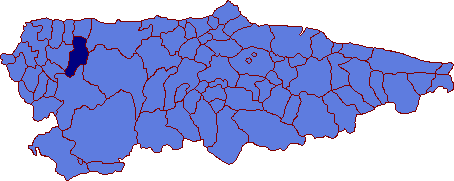
- Location in Asturias.

- Location in Spain
- Coordinates: 43°26′52″N 6°42′17″W
- Country: Spain
- Autonomous community: Asturias
- Province: Asturias
- Comarca: Eo-Navia
- Capital: Villayón

Government
  - Mayor: Monserrat Estefanía González Suárez (PP)

Area
  - Total: 132.46 km^{2} (51.14 sq mi)
- Highest elevation: 1,221 m (4,006 ft)

Population (2025-01-01)
  - Total: 1,054
  - Density: 7.957/km^{2} (20.61/sq mi)
- Time zone: UTC+1 (CET)
  - Summer (DST): UTC+2 (CEST)
- Postal code: 33717
- Website: Official website

Villayón (Asturian pronunciation: [bi.ʎa.ˈʝoŋ]) is a municipality in the Autonomous Community of the Principality of Asturias, Spain. It borders Navia to the north, Cuaña, Boal and Illano to the west, Valdés, Tinéu and Allande to the east and Allande to the south.

== History ==
Evidence of the first human settlement in the area has been found in the Carondiu mountains in the form of barrows and stones. There are also hill forts built by Celtic settlers. In Roman times, gold was mined in Villayón, as attested by remains found in the alluvial deposits around Arbón. After the fall of the Roman Empire, the first references to this area can be found on the plate of Carriu, carved in the 8th century, which includes a reference to two places related to Villayón, called Vila nomine Ciuscau and Portus Astureo.

In the Middle Ages, Villayón belonged to Navia (Pola de Navia) and its owners changed periodically, as the territory was often bought and sold as an asset. This situation ended in the 16th century, when Felipe II confiscated the land to incorporate it into the Crown's domains and the local population formed its own council. In the centuries that followed, the former landowners tried to claim the land, but the royal court ruled in favour of the local inhabitants, who were mainly vaqueiros d'alzada, a cultural group whose main activity was to herd cattle in successive pastures. In the centuries that followed, voices in favour of Villayón's separation from Navia's jurisdiction grew until, after the Spanish Revolution of September 1868, the new government agreed to create a municipality with its own mayor. Despite this, the population began to decline as the locals left for the Americas in search of a better future. From the 60's, this process was accelerated since the population started to leave the municipality for places with better work prospects in Central Asturias and in other European countries. Today, the remaining population commutes to Navia to work and the economy is boosted by tourists who come to explore its natural attractions, such as the Oneta waterfalls, declared a National Monument by Spain.

== Geography ==
The Río Navia passes through the municipality. The waterfalls in Oneta (Cascada de Oneta) are the highest in Asturias.

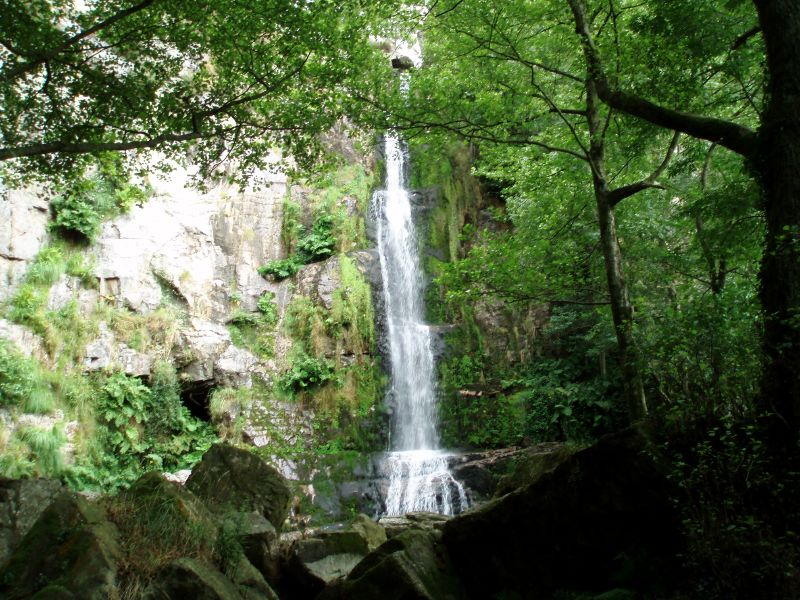
The "Oneta Falls"

=== Population ===
From: INE Archiv

=== Parishes ===
The municipality is formed by six parishes:

- Arbón
- Busmente-Herías-La Muria
- Oneta
- Parḷḷeiru
- Ponticiella
- Villayón (parish)

== Economy ==
Farming has been historically the main economic activity in Villayón. Until the 20th century, all the production was meant to fulfil the needs of the local communities. A variety of cow called "vaca roxa" was the backbone of this industry since it was used for milk, meat and for bartering. It used to roam free in the pastures located in the highlands in the municipality. Afterwards, a second breed was introduced; "vaca frisona" (Holstein Friesian) and forests were cut down to extend pastures and produce more milk.

Agriculture did not play a huge role in the development of the local economy since its production was meant to sustain the local population. In recent years, Villayón has exported successfully its local produced fabas, a variety of white beans that is mainly used for preparing traditional Asturian dishes, such as pote or fabada. It is estimated that 10 tonnes are produced every year.

Due to its proximity with Navia and the poor road connections, industry was not developed in this area. The only source of employment in the secondary sector is energy production due to the workers that operate the Arbón Dam.

In the past decades the local council has been promoting Villayón as a destination for those who desire to explore nature and experience rural life, so tourism has been increasingly important for the local economy.

== Culture ==
=== Language ===
Villayón is located at the linguistic boundary between the eastern group of Galician dialects and the Western group of Asturian dialects. Consequently, parishes are divided in four groups depending on their dominant language:

- Galician speaking parishes:
  - Arbón and Ponticiella
- Parishes divided into Galician and Asturian speaking villages:
  - Parḷḷeiru and Villayón
- Parishes in which a language that presents characteristics of both Asturian and Galician:
  - Oneta and Villayón
- Asturian speaking parishes:
  - Busmente y Eirías

=== Food and Drink ===
Villayón is known for its gastronomy, which is fairly similar to the rest of Asturias, although, there are several peculiarities in which it differs. Pote (a vegetable and white beans (fabas) stew) is normally cooked with collard, but in this municipality it is substituted with rapini. Ox meat has also been established as a specialty of the area.

== See also ==
- List of municipalities in Asturias
