= Parḷḷeiru =

- Country: Spain
- Community: Asturias
- Comarca: Eo-Navia
- Municipality: Villayón

Area
  - Total: 20.68 km^{2} (7.98 sq mi)

Population (2007)
  - Total: 2,001

Parḷḷeiru (Spanish: Parlero) is one of 6 parishes in the municipality of Villayón, in Asturias, Spain.

== Geography ==
Villayón in Asturia

Parḷḷeiru is a Parroquia with 201 inhabitants (2007) and an Area of 20.68 km². Its altitude is 728m. It is 10 km away from the municipal capital Villayón.

=== Rivers and lakes ===
The rivers Parḷḷeiru and el Bauloso join with the Río Bullimeiro and then with the Río Cabornel, entering the Río Navia.

=== Transport ===
Nearest airport: Oviedo

== Economy ==
Agriculture has dominated the region for hundreds of years.

== Climate ==
Warm summers and mild, occasionally harsh Winters. In Autumn there may be strong storms.

== Points of interest ==
- The Church of San Bartolomé

== Smaller villages in the parish ==
- Buḷḷimeiru 12 inhabitants (2007)
- Las Berrugas 5 inhabitants (2007) 43.38939°N 6.66763°W
- La Candanosa 11 inhabitants (2007)
- Los Ḷḷagos 15 inhabitants (2007) 43.40024°N 6.67184°W
- Las Cárcobas 19 inhabitants (2007) 43.40608°N 6.66155°W
- Ḷḷandelfornu 35 inhabitants (2007) 43.38261°N 6.67776°W
- Llandequintá 60 inhabitants (2007) 43.39731°N 6.69475°W
- L'Azoreirina 8 inhabitants (2007) 43.3925°N 6.66711°W
- Valvona 7 inhabitants (2007) 43.40315°N 6.67662°W
- Parḷḷeiru 29 inhabitants (2007) 43.40184°N 6.66999°W
