= San Martín de Oscos =

San Martín de Oscos Samartín d'Ozcos
- Municipality
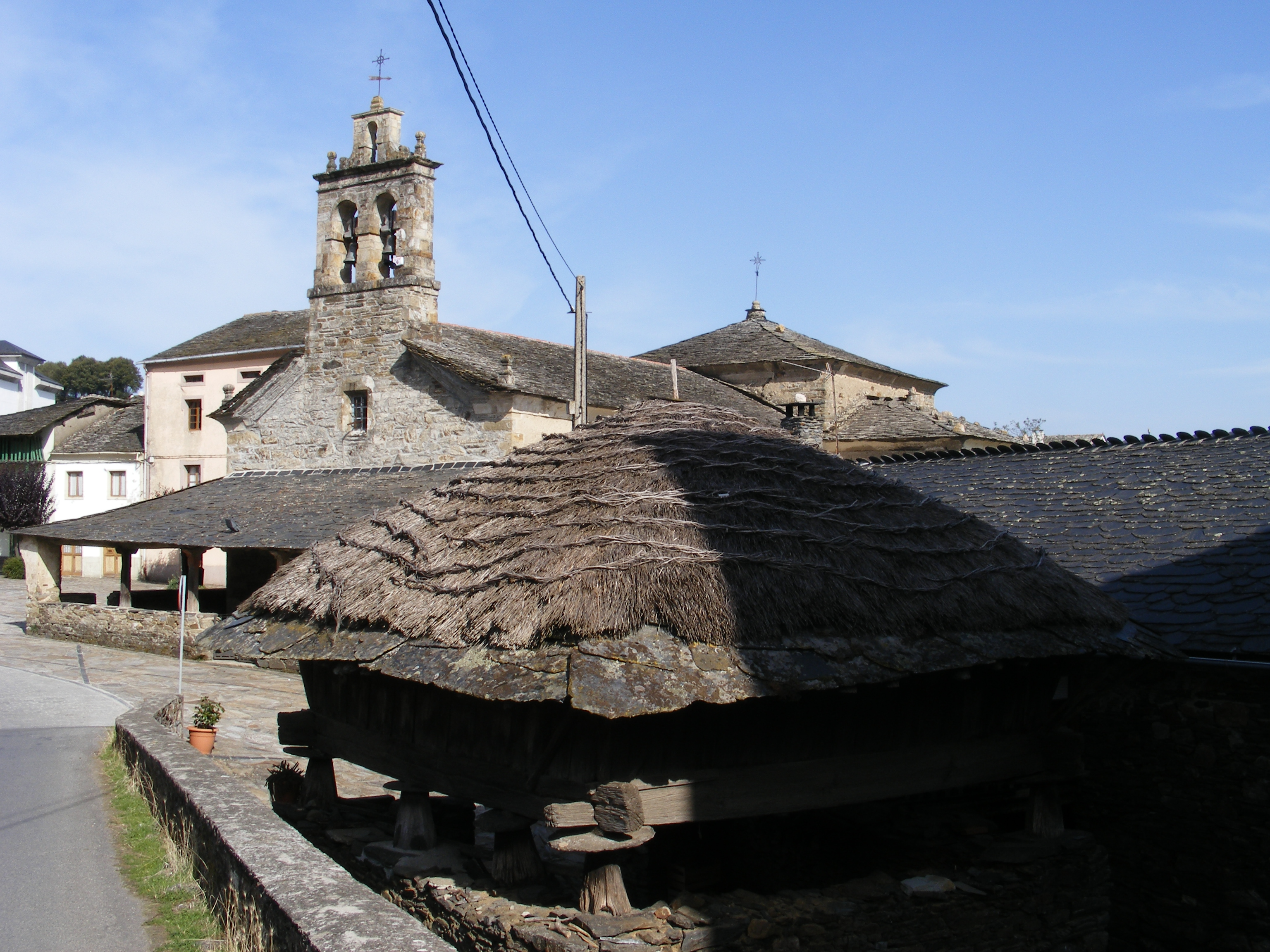
- San Martín de Oscos

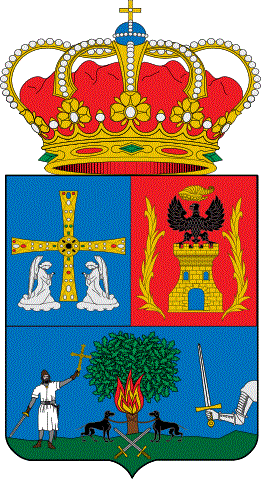
- Coat of arms

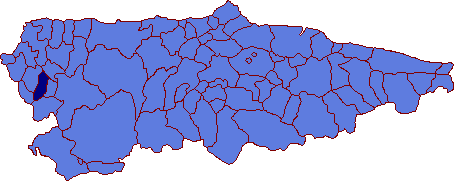

- Location in Spain
- Coordinates: 43°16′N 6°57.7′W
- Country: Spain
- Autonomous community: Asturias
- Province: Asturias
- Comarca: Eo-Navia
- Judicial district: Castropol
- Capital: San Martín

Government
  - Alcalde: José Antonio Martínez Rodil (PSOE)

Area
  - Total: 66.56 km^{2} (25.70 sq mi)
- Highest elevation: 1,081 m (3,547 ft)

Population (2025-01-01)
  - Total: 337
  - Density: 5.06/km^{2} (13.1/sq mi)
- Time zone: UTC+1 (CET)
  - Summer (DST): UTC+2 (CEST)
- Postal code: 33777

San Martín de Oscos (Eonavian: Samartín d'Ozcos) is a municipality in the Autonomous Community of the Principality of Asturias. It is bordered on the north by Illano, on the south by Grandas de Salime, on the east by Pesoz and on the west by Santa Eulalia de Oscos and Villanueva de Oscos.

== History ==
The first known human presence in the territory of San Martín goes back to the Neolithic period, as witnessed by tumulus remains found in Os Pedrousos (Teixera).

There are also remains of ancient mine workings at Arruñada, Piorno, Covas del Resalao, and in the Sotuelo and Ahío valleys.

There are remains of ancient fortified settlements at San Isidro and Pico de la Mina, near to Bousoño, both situated in elevated positions clearly motivated by defensive considerations. The defensive nature is underlined by ditches, walls and stones embedded in the surrounding ground to hinder approach. A gold diadem thought to originate from this culture was found in Valderreixe.

The existence of mineral wealth also attracted outsiders. In Tabladas and on the banks of the river Santalla traces of Roman smelting works have been found, including stone crucibles and slag heaps.

During the medieval period San Martín, together with neighbouring Santa Eulalia and the rest of the Castropol district, was granted to the church in Oviedo by King Alfonso VII in 1154.

This dependency on the bishopric continued until 1584 at which time King Felipe II was liquidating church assets. With the authorisation of Pope Benedict XIII, the bishopric's lands were being sold to the local inhabitants as independent municipalities, to pay for the successive wars in which Spain had been involved. In that year an application, submitted in 1583, was approved and San Martín achieved the status of 'Villa' or town.

In the early 19th century numerous 'mozos' or lads from the Oscos joined the troops of Castropol in the War of Independence from French occupation.

== Parishes ==
The municipality contains four parishes:

- Illano (Eilao) - 12 inhabitants (2006)
- Labiarón - 70 inhabitants (2006)
- Oscos (parish) - 368 inhabitants (2006)
- Pesoz (parish) - 16 inhabitants (2006)

== See also ==
- List of municipalities in Asturias
