= Rozadas =

La Veigadouria
- Parish
- Location within Spain
- Coordinates: 43°26′33″N 6°52′52″W
- Country: Spain
- Autonomous community: Asturias
- Province: Asturias
- Municipality: Boal

La Veigadouria is one of seven parishes in Boal, a municipality, within the province and autonomous community of Asturias, in northern Spain.

It is 24.6 km^{2} (9.5 sq mi) in size with a population of 214 (INE 2005).

The Asturian people of the parish live in several villages, including: El Bidural, Brañallibrel, A Cabana, Carbayal, El Cepón, El Gumio, Ouria, Ransal, Rozadas, Trevé, El Valle Seco and A Veigadouria.
