= Serantes (Tapia de Casariego) =

Parishes in Tapia de Casariego, Asturias, Spain

Serantes is one of four parishes (administrative divisions) in Tapia de Casariego, a municipality within the province and autonomous community of Asturias, in northern Spain.

It has a population of 700.

== Villages and hamlets ==
- Calambre
- La Lomba
- La Penela
- Pedralba
- Rapalcuarto
- Sampolayo
- Santagadea (Santagadía) 43.55°N 6.966667°W
- Vilanova
- Villamil
