= Illano (Oscos) =

Coordinates: 43.333333°N 6.866667°W

Illano is one of four parishes (administrative divisions) in San Martín de Oscos, a municipality within the province and autonomous community of Asturias, in northern Spain.

It is 7.29 km^{2} (2.81 sq mi) in size, with a population of 17 (INE 2006).

== Villages and hamlets ==
- Arruñada (A Arruñada)
- Arne (El Arne)
- San Pedro de Ahio (San Pedro Io)
