= Buen País =

Coordinates: 19°21′N 103°28′W

Buen Pais is a small town located in Tuxpan Municipality, Jalisco, Mexico. The population was 224 according to the 2020 census. It's close to two major cities, Colima and Guadalajara.

For the most part Buen Pais produces corn, agave and sugar cane. There is also a small silver mine.

Buenpais is also known for its rough terrain which bicyclists enjoy using. In October 2007 there was a video made featuring cyclists using there roads for bicycle races it also has many pictures of the town featured in the video.

Link to the video https://www.youtube.com/watch?v=R1Ao54CEsIc

There is also much demand for agave by a liquor company who produces various agave based spirits (mostly sub 35% ABV licor de agave, some with flavorings) by the name of Buen Pais.

The architectural style of the town is colonial Spanish. The Patron Saint of the town is the Sacred Heart of Jesus. They usually celebrate the saint 3 days in May and 1 day in June.
