= Xío =

- Parish
- Location within Spain
- Coordinates: 43°21′46.39″N 6°50′32.84″W
- Country: Spain
- Autonomous community: Asturias
- Province: Asturias
- Municipality: Illano

Xío is one of five parishes in Illano, a municipality within the province and autonomous community of Asturias, in northern Spain. It is situated on a slope with a view of the Navia River.

It is 5.5 km^{2} (2.1 sq mi) in size. The population is 41.

== Villages ==
- Xío
- El Alto de Folgueiróu
- Os Canteiros
- As Lleiras
- A Llomba
- As Penas
- El Rebollal
- Os Salgueiros
- El Vao
- Xanxuyán
