= Tol (Castropol) =

- Parish
- Location within Spain
- Coordinates: 43.533333°N 6.933333°W
- Country: Spain
- Autonomous community: Asturias
- Province: Asturias
- Municipality: Castropol

Tol is one of nine parishes (administrative divisions) in the Castropol municipality, within the province and autonomous community of Asturias, in northern Spain. The population is 340 (INE 2005).
