= Seares (Castropol) =

- Parish
- Location within Spain
- Coordinates: 43.483333°N 7.016667°W
- Country: Spain
- Autonomous community: Asturias
- Province: Asturias
- Municipality: Castropol

Seares is one of nine parishes (administrative divisions) in the Castropol municipality, within the province and autonomous community of Asturias, in northern Spain.

The population is 230 (INE 2005).
