= Buyaso =

- Parish
- Location within Spain
- Country: Spain
- Autonomous community: Asturias
- Province: Asturias
- Municipality: Illano

Buyaso is one of five parishes in Illano, a municipality within the province and autonomous community of Asturias, in northern Spain.

It is 16.07 km^{2} (6.20 sq mi) in size. The population is 136.

== Villages ==
- A Baboreira
- Bustello
- Buyaso
- Llanteiro
- Llombatín
- El Poceiro
- El Villar de Buyaso

=== Hamlets ===
- El Cortín
- A Chousaveya
- A Penella
