= Eirías =

Coordinates: 43.316667°N 6.8°W

- Parish
- Interactive map of Eirías
- Country: Spain
- Autonomous community: Asturias
- Province: Asturias
- Municipality: Illano

Eirías (Spanish: Herías or Santa María de Herías) is one of five parishes in the municipality of Illano in Asturias, Spain. It is also the municipal capitol.

It is 25.65 km^{2} (9.90 sq mi) in size. The population is 15 (Padron Municipal de Illano, 2007).

The Capilla (chapel) de Eirías is linked to the López Castrillón.

== Villages ==
- Cernías
- Estela
- Navedo
- Rudivoca
- Rudivillar
- Sarzol
- Tamagordas
