= Miranda Palace =

Coordinates: 43.4078°N 6.8061°W

The Miranda Palace is located in the village of Prelo, which belongs to the municipality of Boal, in the Principality of Asturias (Spain). It was built during the 15th and 16th centuries and it was declared a "well of cultural interest" in 1982.

At first it consisted of a square tower with three floors that was subsequently extended. It had small openings that were later enlarged. The main body of the palace has two floors in the back side and one floor in the front side, due to the unevenness of the terrain. Above the entrance door is placed a big coat of arms belonging to the family González de Prelo y Castrillón. The palace has a chapel too, which dates from 1776, having a rectangle floor with two loopholes in both wings, and two Rococo-inspired altarpieces painted in black and white. The wooden sculptures it housed, from the 17th and 18th centuries, were removed because of the bad condition of the ceiling. Between the tower and the chapel there is an extra body, with corridors supported by stone columns.

Nowadays, the whole palace has been restored to become a four-star hotel.
