= Old Common Council of Castropol =

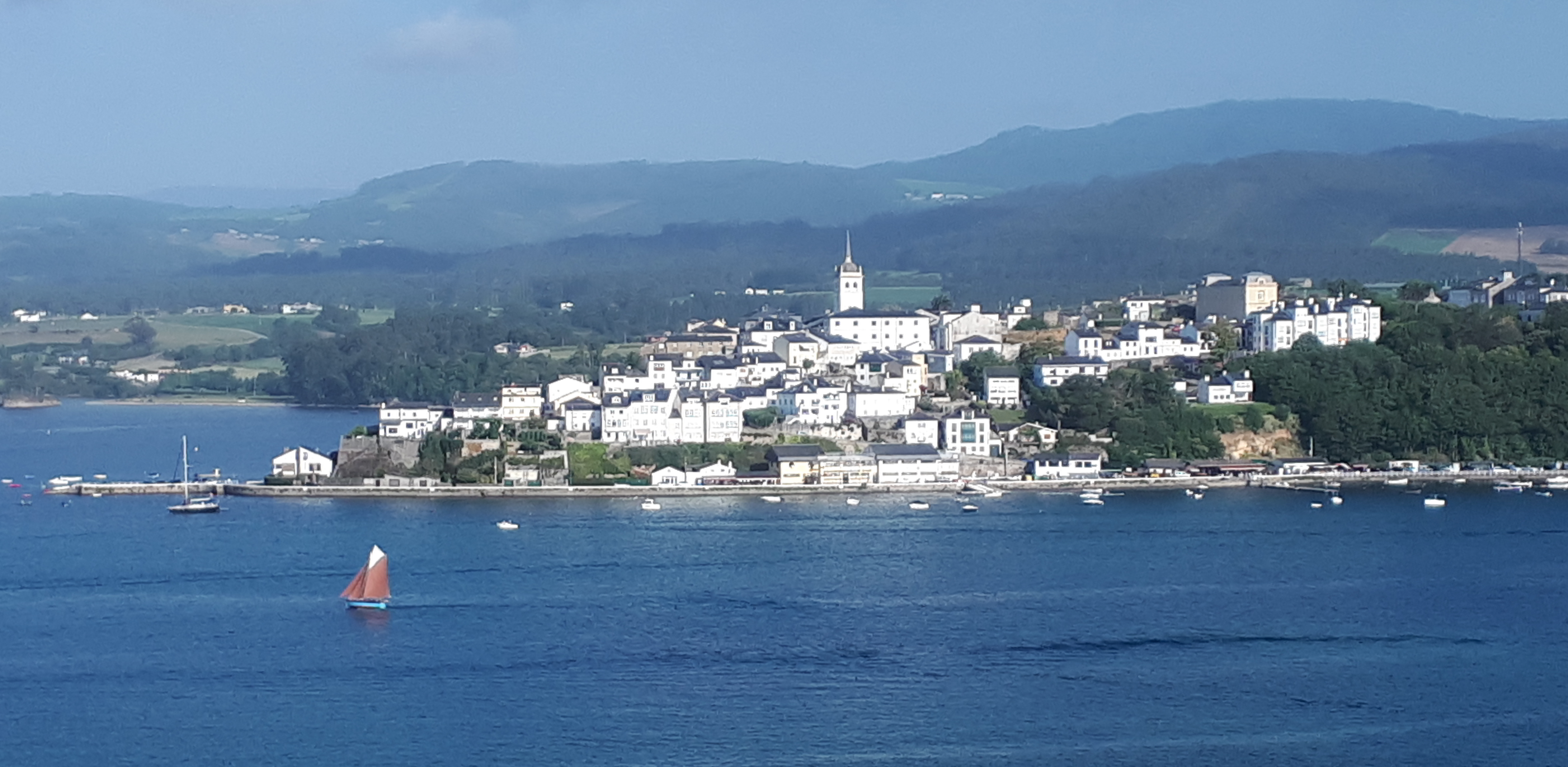
Castropol Village

Old Common Council of Castropol, also Eo-Navia Land, Entrambasauguas or Honor de Suarón and Grandas is the name that was historically given to the sixteen westernmost municipalities of Asturias located between the Eo and Navia rivers. These municipalities belonged to the sixth sección or party (known as 'Episcopalias') that made up the Junta General del Principado, the historical governing body of Asturias. Episcopalías was composed by the following municipalities or concejos: Castropol, Rivera de Abajo, Rivera de Arriba, Langreo, Llanera, Quirós, Teverga, Noreña, Las Regueras, Navia, Morcín, Tudela, Proaza, Santo Adriano, Pajares, Riosa, Olloniego, Yernes y Tameza, Bimenes, Paderni, Sobrescobio and Peñaflor.

During the Roman Empire, the villages belonging to the region were linked to the parish of Britonia within the Lucensis Conventum, however, in 812, as a consequence of the Muslim invasion, King Alfonso II agreed to incorporate the Diocese of Britonia into the Diocese of Oviedo, which had no antecedents, but which had several monasteries in Asturias, such as the one in the city of Oviedo itself.

With the restoration of Mondoñedo, heir of Britonia, Mondoñedo was compensated for the territory given to Oviedo with certain territories belonging to Iria Flavia that had never belonged to Britonia, leaving the territories between the Eo and Navia rivers definitively unlinked.

Father Henrique Flórez, commenting on the parchment of the Cathedral of Mondoñedo, dated 867, (Tumbo Mondoñedo, p. 35-36, f. 196r) points out how the diocese of Oviedo absorbed that of Britonia and incorporated it into the new diocese of Oviedo, but after the re-emergence of the diocese of Mondoñedo, declared heir to it, the king compensated for the deprivation of more than half of its territory by assigning as diocesan territory Trasancos, Besancos and Pruncios, which he took as compensation for what Mondoñedo had before in Asturias..

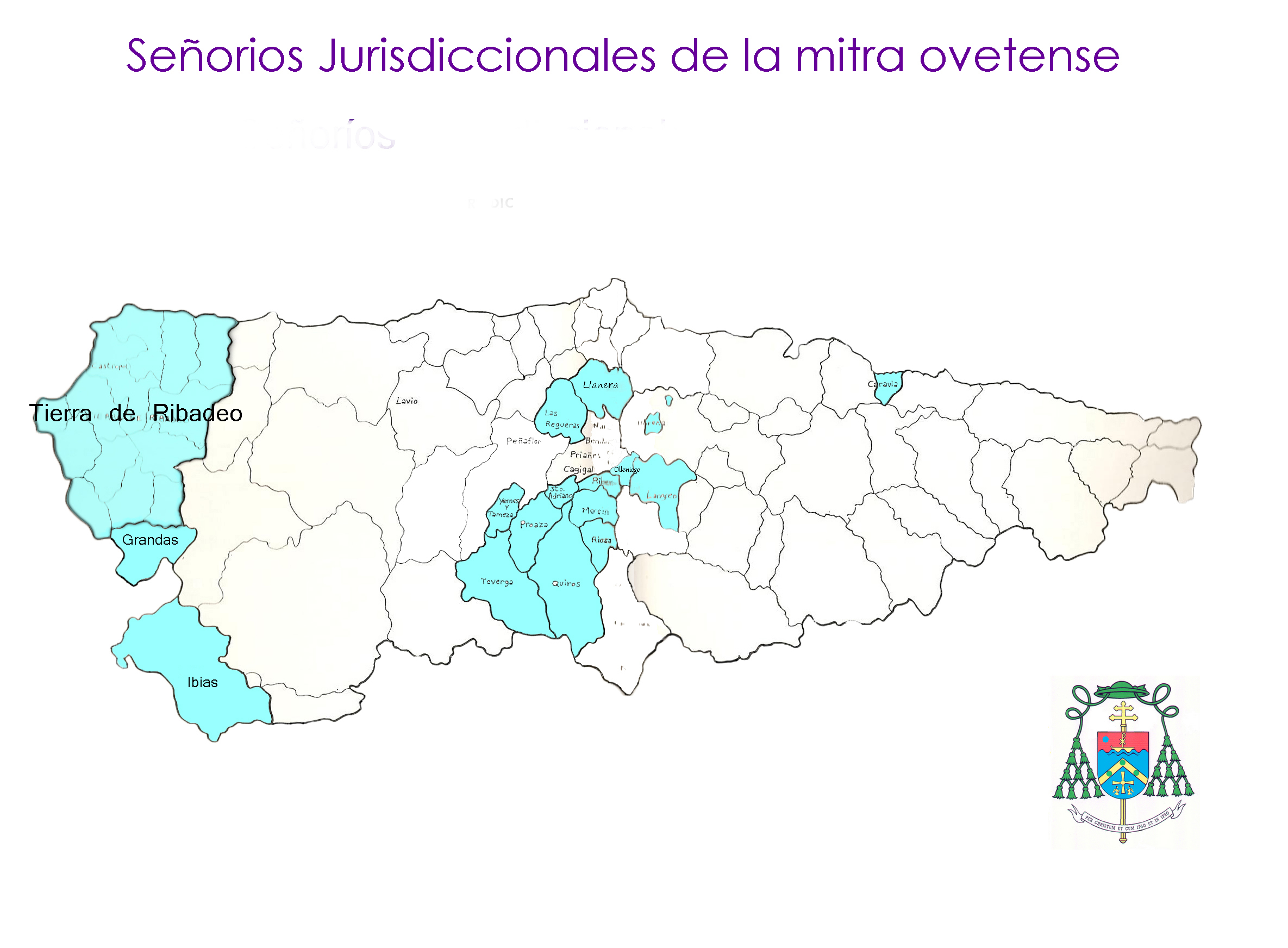
The bishop's manors in Asturias. To the Old Council of Castropol belong all the Western End of Asturias: Terra de Ribadeo, Grandas and Ibias

During the second half of the 12th century, the region came under the direct influence of the bishopry of Oviedo as a result of an 1154 land grant by Fernando II of León. After its emancipation from the ecclesiastical authority, the Common Council of Castropol was admitted into the Junta General del Principado.

Despite a common history with Asturias, the region has many unique cultural and linguistic traits. The region has its own officially recognized language, Galician-Asturian, part of the Portuguese-Galician subgroup.
