= Presno =

- Parish
- Location within Spain
- Coordinates: 43.466667°N 6.983333°W
- Country: Spain
- Autonomous community: Asturias
- Province: Asturias
- Municipality: Castropol

Presno is one of nine parishes (administrative divisions) in the Castropol municipality, within the province and autonomous community of Asturias, in northern Spain.

The population is 385 (INE 2005).
