= Barres (Castropol) =

- Parish
- Location within Spain
- Coordinates: 43.533333°N 7°W
- Country: Spain
- Autonomous community: Asturias
- Province: Asturias
- Municipality: Castropol

Barres is one of nine parishes (administrative divisions) in Castropol, a municipality within the province and autonomous community of Asturias, in northern Spain.

The population is 652 (INE 2005).

== Transportation ==
- How to travel to Barres, on Moovit
