= Tapia de Casariego =

Tapia
- Municipality
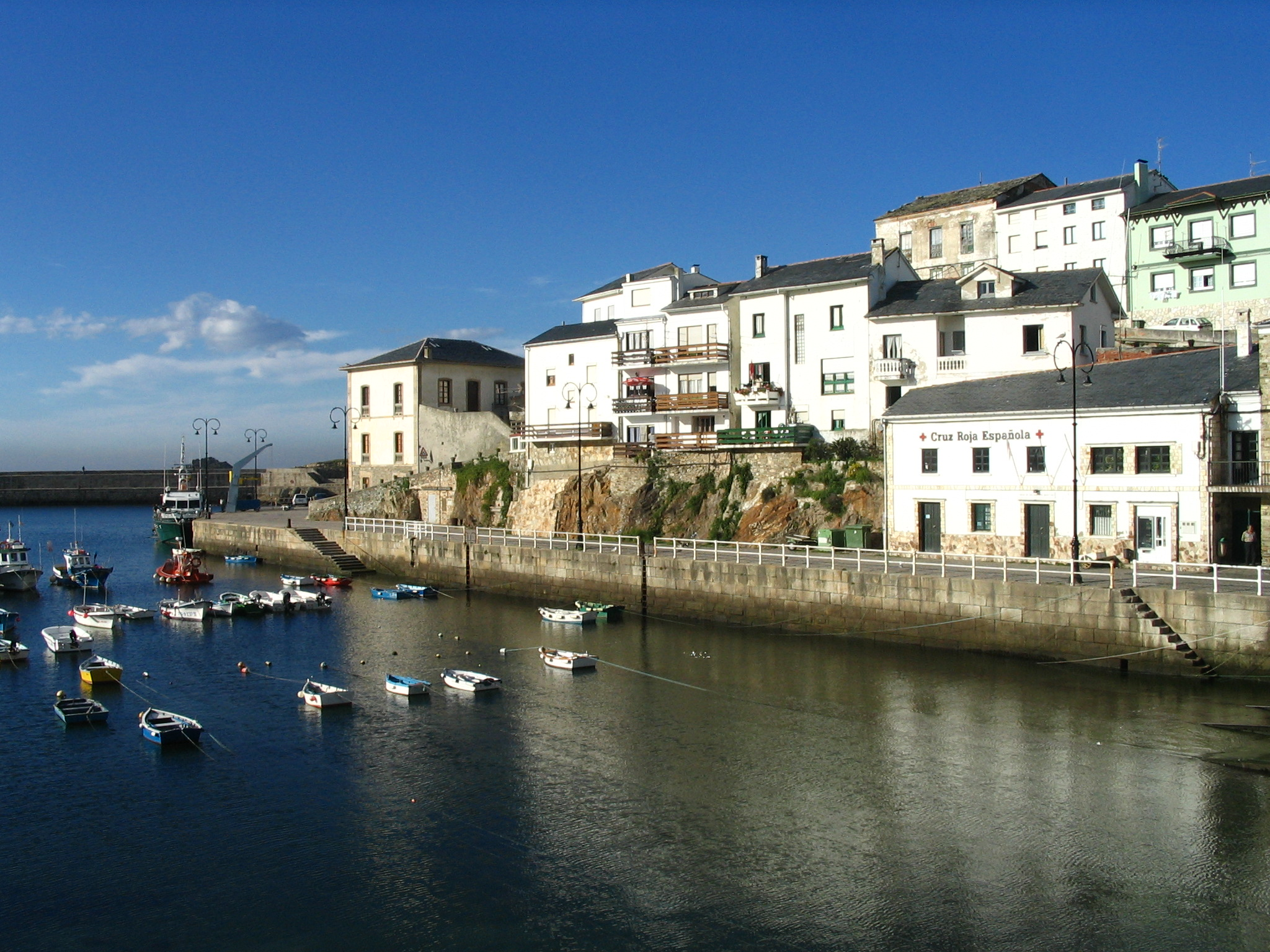
- Tapia

- Flag Coat of arms

- Location of Tapia de Casariego

- Location in Spain
- Coordinates: 43°34′N 6°57′W
- Country: Spain
- Autonomous community: Asturias
- Province: Asturias
- Comarca: Eo-Navia
- Capital: Tapia

Government
  - Alcalde: Manuel Jesús González Díaz

Area
  - Total: 65.99 km^{2} (25.48 sq mi)
- Elevation: 645 m (2,116 ft)

Population (2025-01-01)
  - Total: 3,538
  - Density: 53.61/km^{2} (138.9/sq mi)
- Demonym: tapiego
- Time zone: UTC+1 (CET)
  - Summer (DST): UTC+2 (CEST)
- Postal code: 33740
- Official language(s): Spanish
- No official language(s): Eonavian
- Website: Official website

Tapia (Spanish: Tapia de Casariego) is a municipality in the Autonomous Community of the Principality of Asturias, Spain. It is bordered on the north by the Cantabrian Sea, on the east by El Franco, on the south and west by Castropol. Tapia is also the name of one of the parishes inside the municipality. Its capital is Tapia. The capital is 127 km from Oviedo, 122 km from Gijón, and 97 km from Lugo.

== Geography ==
The council is divided into parishes, formed in turn by places or neighborhoods (small groups of widely scattered houses) throughout the territory. This is due to land ownership typical in the Autonomous Community: smallholder highly fragmented into small parcels. The terrain is gentle enough altitudes into the interior of the municipality are the most noteworthy pointing the Grandela (348 m) and the hill of Posadoiro (600 m). The Council has diverse beaches among which are found, the Penarronda (shared with the council in Castropol), Santa Gadea, Serantes, Los Campos, Porcía (Shared with the council of El Franco).

== History ==
The council was established in 1863, when several parishes of the councils of Castropol (3) and El Franco (1) separated. The main driving force behind the creation of the new council was Fernando Fernández de Casariego, Marquis de Casariego. In recognition and appreciation, the Tapia council completed its name as 'Tapia de Casariego'.

In the 10th century, King Ramiro II donated to the Bishop of Oviedo the territory between the Eo River and the Navia River, including the current council Tapia de Casariego. This grant was ratified by King Alfonso VII in the 12th century, which confirms that the territory of Oviedo is the Obispalia, in strong conflict with that of Lugo Salave retaining possessions and Villamil.

== Economy ==
Currently, the primary sector remains the greatest number of jobs generated, with just over 41% of the total. While agriculture, livestock and fisheries are in a slow decline in the tertiary sector.

The secondary sector is the least influence on the town, representing 18% of local jobs. The construction industry is one that generates more jobs, with some also representing the food industry and processing of metals.

The tertiary sector represents about 41% of the local economy, due to tourism in the area.

== Population ==
From: INE Archiv

== Parishes ==
- Mantaras
- Campos y Salave
- La Roda
- Serantes

== See also ==
- List of municipalities in Asturias
