= Eo-Navia (comarca) =

Coordinates: 43°23′55″N 6°54′48″W

- Comarca
- Flag Coat of arms
- Country: Spain
- Autonomous community: Asturias
- Province: Asturias
- Capital: Navia
- Municipalities: List: Valdés, Navia, Villayón, Coaña, Boal, Eilao, Pezós, Grandas de Salime, El Franco, Tapia, Samartín d'Ozcos, Santalla d'Ozcos, Vilanova d'Ozcos, Castropol, Veiga d'Eo, Santiso d'Abres, Taramundi

Area
  - Total: 1,645 km^{2} (635 sq mi)

Population
  - Total: 67,307
  - Density: 40.92/km^{2} (106.0/sq mi)
- Time zone: UTC+1 (CET)
  - Summer (DST): UTC+2 (CEST)

Eo-Navia is one of eight comarca administrative divisions of the province and autonomous community of Asturias in Spain.

== Culture and history ==
Eonavian, a Galician dialect, is spoken in the region. This administrative division should not be confused with the historical comarca of Eo-Navia or Old Common Council of Castropol.

== Municipalities ==
The comarca of Eo-Navia is divided into 17 municipalities (in Asturian conceyos). From east to west, they are:

- Valdés
- Navia
- Villayón
- Cuaña
- Boal
- Eilao
- Pezós
- Grandas de Salime
- El Franco
- Tapia
- Samartín d'Ozcos
- Santalla d'Ozcos
- Vilanova d'Ozcos
- Castropol
- Veiga d'Eo
- Santiso d'Abres
- Taramundi
