= Doiras =

- Parish
- Location within Spain
- Coordinates: 43.383333°N 6.833333°W
- Country: Spain
- Autonomous community: Asturias
- Province: Asturias
- Municipality: Boal

Doiras is one of seven parishes (administrative divisions) in Boal, a municipality within the province and autonomous community of Asturias, in northern Spain.

It is 12.95 km^{2} (5.00 sq mi) in size with a population of 172 (INE 2007).

== Villages ==
- La Cabana
- Carrugueiro
- Doiras
- La Escrita
- Froseira
- Llanteiróu
- El Mazo
- Muñón
- Piñeira
- Silvón
