= Corominas =

Corominas is a Spanish surname that may refer to

- Ernest Corominas (1913–1992), Spanish-French mathematician
- Ferran Corominas (born 1983), Spanish football forward
- Juan Manuel González Corominas (born 1968), Spanish off-road motorbike driver
- Lluís Corominas (born 1963), Spanish lawyer and politician
- Manuel Jalón Corominas (1925–2011), Spanish inventor
- María Corominas (born 1952), Spanish swimmer

== See also ==
- Coromines
