= Los Laureles =

Coordinates: 25.3108°S 57.5784°W

- Barrio
- Interactive map of Los Laureles
- Country: Paraguay
- Autonomous Capital District: Gran Asunción
- City: Asunción

Area
  - Total: 0.90 km^{2} (0.35 sq mi)
- Elevation: 43 m (141 ft)

Population
  - Total: 4,010

Los Laureles is a neighbourhood (barrio) of Asunción, Paraguay.
