= Los Mazos =

Coordinates: 19.57°N 103.50°W

- town
- Interactive map of Los Mazos

Population
  - Total: 132

Los Mazos is a town situated in Tuxpan Municipality, Jalisco, Mexico. The population was 132 according to the 2020 census. Los Mazos sits at a height of 1,780 meters. Located on the skirts of a couple of volcanoes, an inactive one called El Nevado de Colima and an active one called the Volcan de Colima, also known as the Volcan de Fuego or "fire volcano". It is located near the city of Tuxpan and is located within its municipality. The town of Los Mazos once belonged to a bigger hacienda and shares a common water system and storage pools called "tanques" with Las Canoas, another few tanques are located throughout the region. The tanques are constructed with cement and stone, and coated in a mixture of cement and ox blood giving them a dark ocher look, these tanques were used to store potable, cattle and plant water.

Farming and cattle are the main sources of income for the small community. A high number of people have migrated to several parts of the United States, with large numbers in the states of California, Florida, and Virginia. Only a few family names are originally from the town including, Chavez, Gutierrez, Vega, and Zuniga.

Los Mazos is famous for several staple foods and beverages, namely pomegranate juice and "ponche" an alcoholic drink also made from pomegranate renowned for its smoothness and rich fruity flavor. It is also famous for its few varieties of peaches, limes, lemons, various other citrus fruits, guava, and avocado.

A major holiday in the town of Los Mazos is the annual town fair in October. It is mainly a religious celebration, usually consisting of a very early morning musical offering to the Virgin of Guadalupe, accompanied by hot tea or coffee with cookies and bread, a noon mass and receiving of pilgrims from a nearby town, celebrated by eating a meal after the mass that is usually a dish called birria, and ponche is commonly toasted. A rodeo and dance are also normally on the agenda and the proceeds from both go to funding church renovations and the budget for the celebrations.
