= Castrillón (surname) =

Castrillón is a Spanish surname. Notable people with the surname include:

- Álvaro Mejía Castrillón (born 1967), Colombian road bicycle racer
- Eduardo Crespo y García-Castrillón, 8th Count of Castillo Fiel (fl. 1963–1989), Spanish aristocrat
- Darío Castrillón Hoyos (1929–2018), Colombian Cardinal of the Catholic Church
- Jaime Castrillón (born 1983), Colombian footballer
- Manuel Fernández Castrillón (c. 1780–1836), major general in the Mexican army
