= Rhondda (disambiguation) =

Rhondda may refer to:

- Rhondda, or the Rhondda Valley, a former coal mining valley in Wales
- River Rhondda river in South Wales
  - Rhondda Fawr the larger of the two valleys in the Rhondda
  - Rhondda Fach the smaller of the two valleys in the Rhondda
- Rhondda Cynon Taf, a county borough in Glamorgan, South Wales

== Political wards and constituencies ==
- Rhondda (UK Parliament constituency), a constituency of the House of Commons of the Parliament of the United Kingdom from 1885 to 1918, and from 1974 to present
- Rhondda East (UK Parliament constituency), created in 1918, abolished in 1974
- Rhondda West (UK Parliament constituency), created in 1918, abolished in 1974
- Rhondda (Senedd constituency), a constituency of the Senedd
- Rhondda (district), a former local government district in Wales
- Rhondda (Pontypridd electoral ward), an electoral division of Rhondda Cynon Taf county borough council, Wales

== Other uses ==
- Cwm Rhondda, a hymn tune, after the Welsh name of the Rhondda Valley.
- Glan Rhondda, the original name of the Welsh National Anthem, Hen Wlad fy Nhadau.
- Viscount Rhondda, a title in the Peerage of the United Kingdom

== People with the given name Rhondda ==
- Rhondda Bosworth (born 1944), New Zealand photographer and artist
- Rhondda Gillespie (1941 – 2010), Australian classical pianist
- Rhondda Jones, Australian zoologist
- Rhondda Alder Kelly (1926-2014), Australian model

== See also ==
- Rhonda, given name
