= Jordi Guixé i Coromines =

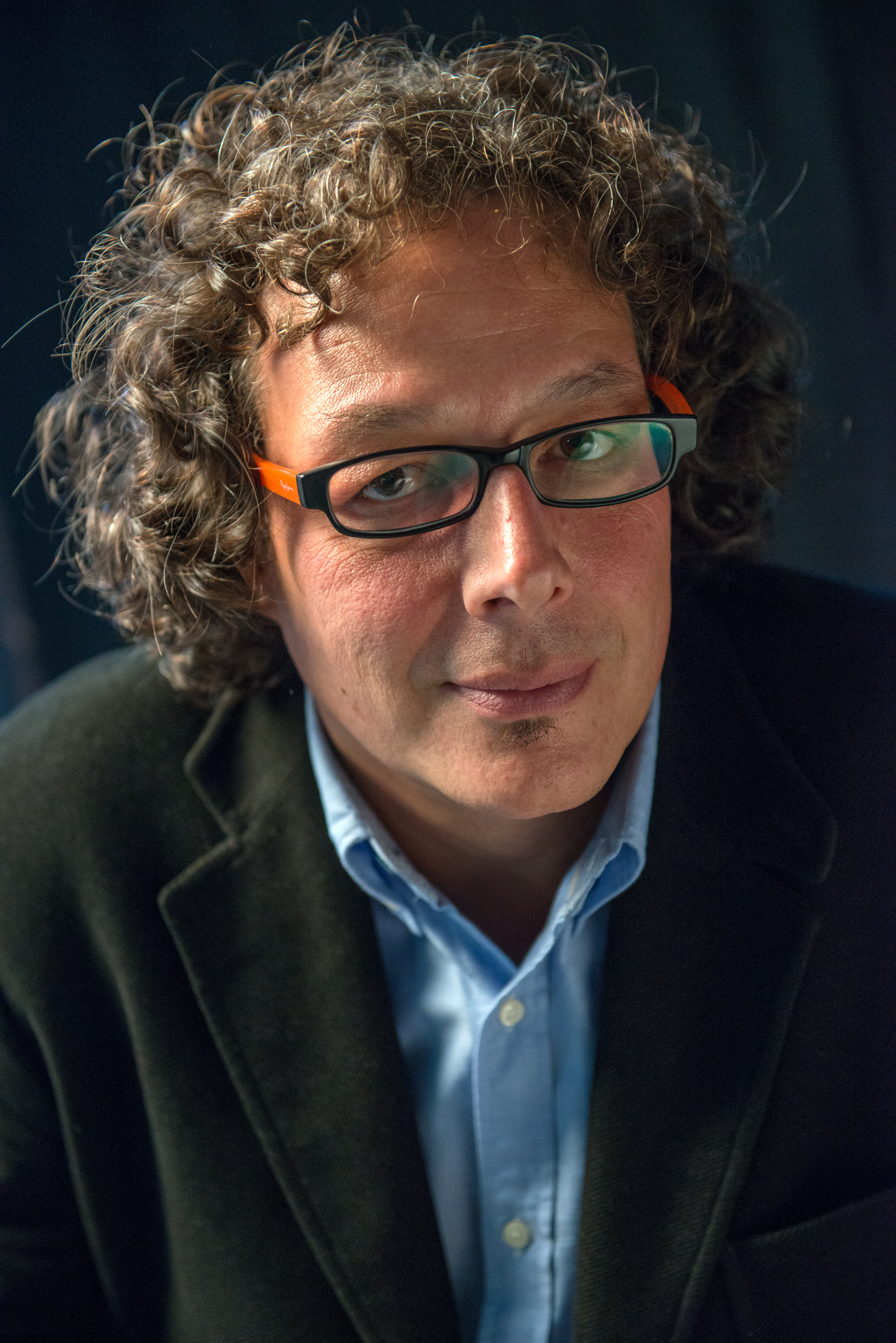
Jordi Guixé i Coromines, historian. Director of the European Observatory on Memories.

Jordi Guixé i Coromines (Solsona, 1970) is a historian, founder director of the European Observatory on Memories (EUROM) of the University of Barcelona Solidarity's Foundation and an associate professor. With a Ph.D. in Contemporary History from both the University of Barcelona and the University of Paris III (Mención Prêt d'Honneur du Ministère de la Culture), he is currently a member of several research groups, such as the Institut des Sciences Politique du Socials of the Centre National de la Recherche Scientifique (CNRS), Centre d'Estudis de les Èpoques Franquista i Democràtica of the Universitat Autónoma de Barcelona (CEFID-UAB), the Group of Research on Memory and Society at the Universitat de Barcelona and the Centre de Recherche sur les Sociétés et Environments en Méditerranée (CRESEM) of the Université de Perpignan Via Domitia (UPVD). In 2016 he was elected vicechair of the Board of the International Committee of Memorial Museums in Remembrance of the Victims of Public Crimes (IC-MEMO), one of the 31 committees of the International Council of Museums (ICOM). From 2007 to 2010, J. Guixé participated in the creation of the Memorial Democràtic de Catalunya and was responsible of the heritage area as well as international relations. Among other projects, he coordinated the Census of Francoist Symbols in Catalonia.

== Research ==
Specialized in public policies of memory, Jordi Guixé is best known for his researches on Francisco Franco's repression over political exile of the Spanish Civil War, World War II and the Cold War, having organized and contributed to many publications on the topic. His work "Diplomacia y represión: la persecución hispano-francesa del exilio republicano, 1937-1951" was awarded the essay prize "España y sus exilios". In 2016 he presented "Past and Power. Public Policies on Memory. Debates, from Global to Local". The book is a collection of articles written by specialists in multiple disciplines that discuss key challenges of the conflict of memories in Europe and Latin America.

== Selected bibliography ==
- Past and Power. Public Policies on Memory. Debates, from Global to Local (ed). Publicacions UB, Observing Memories, Barcelona, 2016.
- Políticas públicas de la memoria: I Coloquio Internacional Memorial Democràtic. Jordi Guixé, Montserrat Iniesta (ed.)
- Les Corts Women Prison Future Memorial. Ricart Ulldemolins, Nuria and Guixé, Jordi. On the w@terfront [s.l.] : Universitat de Barcelona, 2015 1139-7365 2015: Núm.: 36/1 Memòria i ciutadania. Interdisciplina, recerca i acció creativa, p. 15-31
- L’Europa de Franco. L’esquerra antifranquista i la "caça de bruixes" a l’inici de la Guerra Freda, França 1943-1951. Publicacions Abadia de Montserrat, Biblioteca Serra d’Or, Barcelona setembre del 2002.
- Diplomacia y represión. La persecución Franco-española del exilio republicano. Editorial Luarna, Madrid, 2011.
- Sant Pere de Graudescales, un Monestir Alt-Medieval. Ajuntament de Navès–Solsonès, 1999.
- La República Perseguida. Exilio y represión en la Francia de Franco, 1937-1951. Publicacions Universitat de València, València, 2012.

== Exhibitions ==
- Símbols de Franco (Memorial Democràtic de Catalunya, 2010)

== Film consulting ==
- La Bataille du Varsovie. Info TV (2012).
- Espies de Franco. TV3, TVE, France 2 and Canal Història. Batabat Produccions (2010)
- Visca la Segona República. Memorial Democràtic.
- Els Espais de Memòria de Catalunya (TV Series). Comunicàlia TV and Memorial Democràtic.
- Emboscats, geografía d’una història silenciada. E2S, TV3 i Centre d’Estudis Lacetans.
- Els deportats solsonins als camps nazis. E2 Produccions and Centre d’Estudis Lacetans.
