= Castriyón =

- Parish
- Location within Spain
- Coordinates: 43.383333°N 6.783333°W
- Country: Spain
- Autonomous community: Asturias
- Province: Asturias
- Municipality: Boal

Population
  - Total: ~16

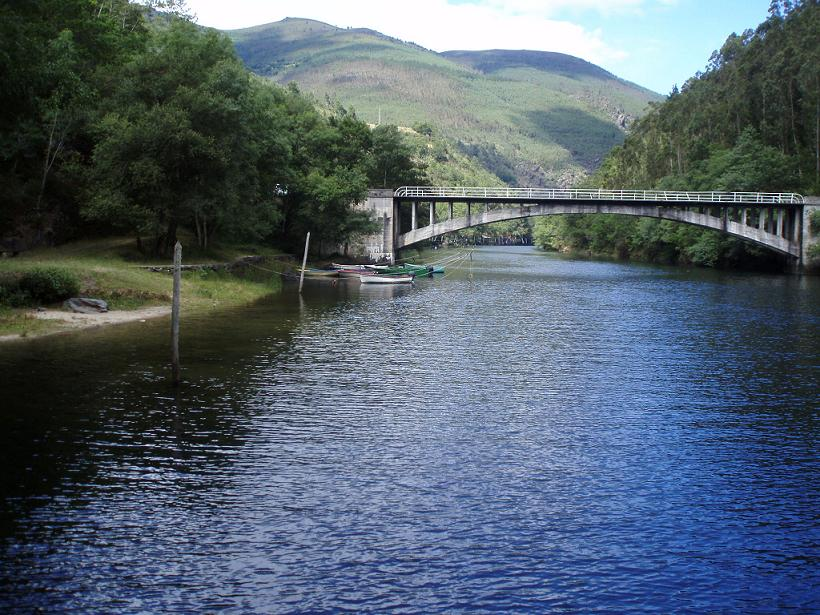
Panorama of Castriyón

Castriyón is one of seven parishes (administrative divisions) in Boal, a municipality within the province and autonomous community of Asturias, in northern Spain.

It is 20.04 km^{2} (7.74 sq mi) in size with a population of 195 (INE 2011).

== Villages ==
- A Rondía
- As Mestas
- Castriyón
- El Rebollal
- Folgueiramayor
- Fontescavadas
- Llendigresia
- Reigoto
- Sampol
- Sarceda
- Silvón
