= A Ronda (Boal) =

- Parish
- Location within Spain
- Coordinates: 43°24′30″N 6°52′37″W
- Country: Spain
- Autonomous community: Asturias
- Province: Asturias
- Municipality: Boal

Area
  - Total: 16.5 km^{2} (6.4 sq mi)

Population
  - Total: 46
  - Density: 2.79/km^{2} (7.2/sq mi)
- Time zone: UTCUTC+01:00

A Ronda (also known as La Ronda) is one of seven parishes (administrative divisions) in Boal, a municipality within the province and autonomous community of Asturias, in northern Spain.

It is 16.5 km^{2} (6.4 sq mi) in size with a population of 45 (INE 2019).

A Ronda has an altitude of 585 meters above sea level. It is located about 12.5 kilometers (7.77 miles) from the county seat.

== Villages ==
- A Baxada
- A Ronda
- Brañadesella
- Brañavara
- El Villar de San Pedro
