= A Ronda (Eilao) =

- Parish
- Location within Spain
- Country: Spain
- Autonomous community: Asturias
- Province: Asturias
- Municipality: Illano

A Ronda is one of five parishes in Illano, a municipality within the province and autonomous community of Asturias, in northern Spain.

It is 15.6 km^{2} (6.0 sq mi) in size. The population is 33. The postal code is 33728.

== Villages ==
- El Pato
- A Braña del Pato
- Cabanela
- Castañín
- Ferreiro
- A Soma
- Suacapiya
- Silvareye
- Meisnado
