= Castropol =

- Municipality
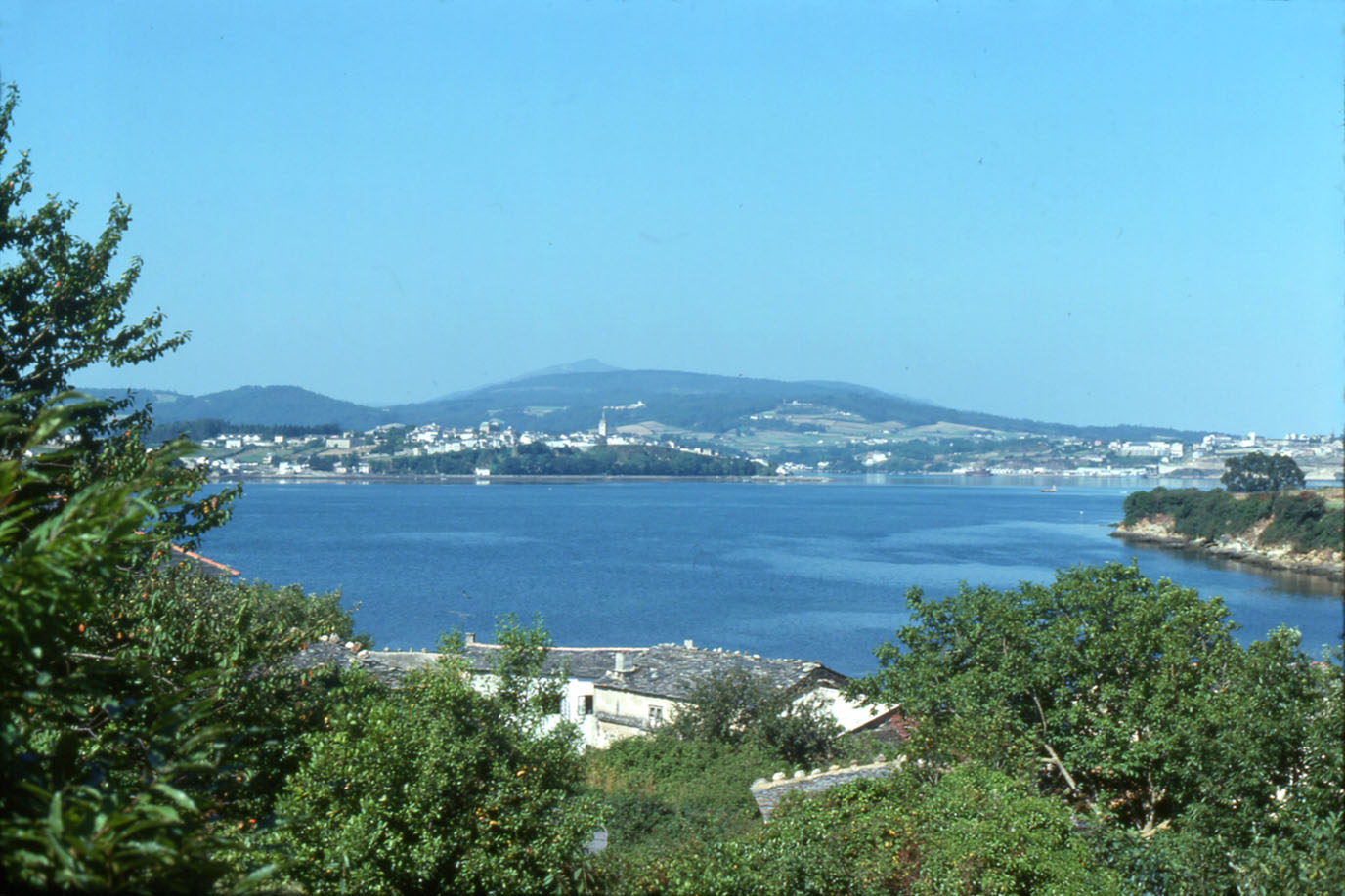
- Castropol seen from the east across the Eo river estuary c.1975

- Flag Coat of arms

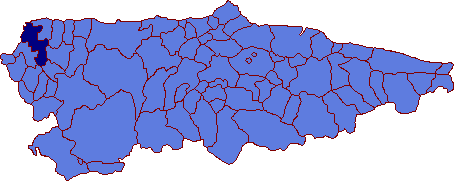

- Location in Spain
- Coordinates: 43°32′N 7°2′W
- Country: Spain
- Autonomous community: Asturias
- Province: Asturias
- Comarca: Eo-Navia
- Judicial district: Castropol
- Capital: Castropol

Government
  - Alcalde: Francisco Javier Vinjoy Valea (PSOE)

Area
  - Total: 125.77 km^{2} (48.56 sq mi)
- Highest elevation: 1,197 m (3,927 ft)

Population (2025-01-01)
  - Total: 3,202
  - Density: 25.46/km^{2} (65.94/sq mi)
- Demonym: castropolense
- Time zone: UTC+1 (CET)
  - Summer (DST): UTC+2 (CEST)
- Postal code: 33760, 33768, 33769, 33778 and 33794
- Website: Official website

Castropol is a municipality in Asturias, Spain. It is also the name of a parish within the municipality and a town within the parish.

The municipality of Castropol has a population of 3696 (INE, 2014). It is bounded on the north by the Cantabrian Sea and on the west by a coastal inlet, or ria, which separates it from the municipality of Ribadeo in Galicia, called the river Eo. To the west it is bordered by Tapia de Casariego, by El Franco, Boal and other Asturian municipalities, and to the south by Vegadeo and Villanueva de Oscos.

Castropol is one of the municipalities in which Eonaviego, a Galician-Asturian dialect, is spoken.

Some examples of notable architecture include the 'Capilla del Campo' (15th century), the 'Palacio de Valledor' and 'Palacio de Marqueses de Santa Cruz de Marcenado' (16th-18th centuries, the 'Casa de las Cuatro Torres' (18th century), and the 'Parque de Vicente Loriente' and 'Casino/Casa de Cultura' (early 20th century).

== Parishes ==
It has nine parishes (administrative divisions):

- As Figueiras
- Balmonte
- Barres
- Castropol
- Moldes
- Piñera
- Presno
- Seares
- Tol

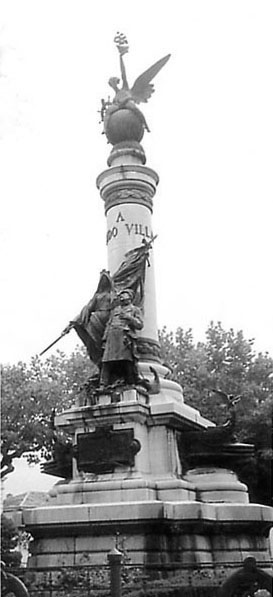
Memorial to Fernando Villaamil erected in 1911 in Castropol

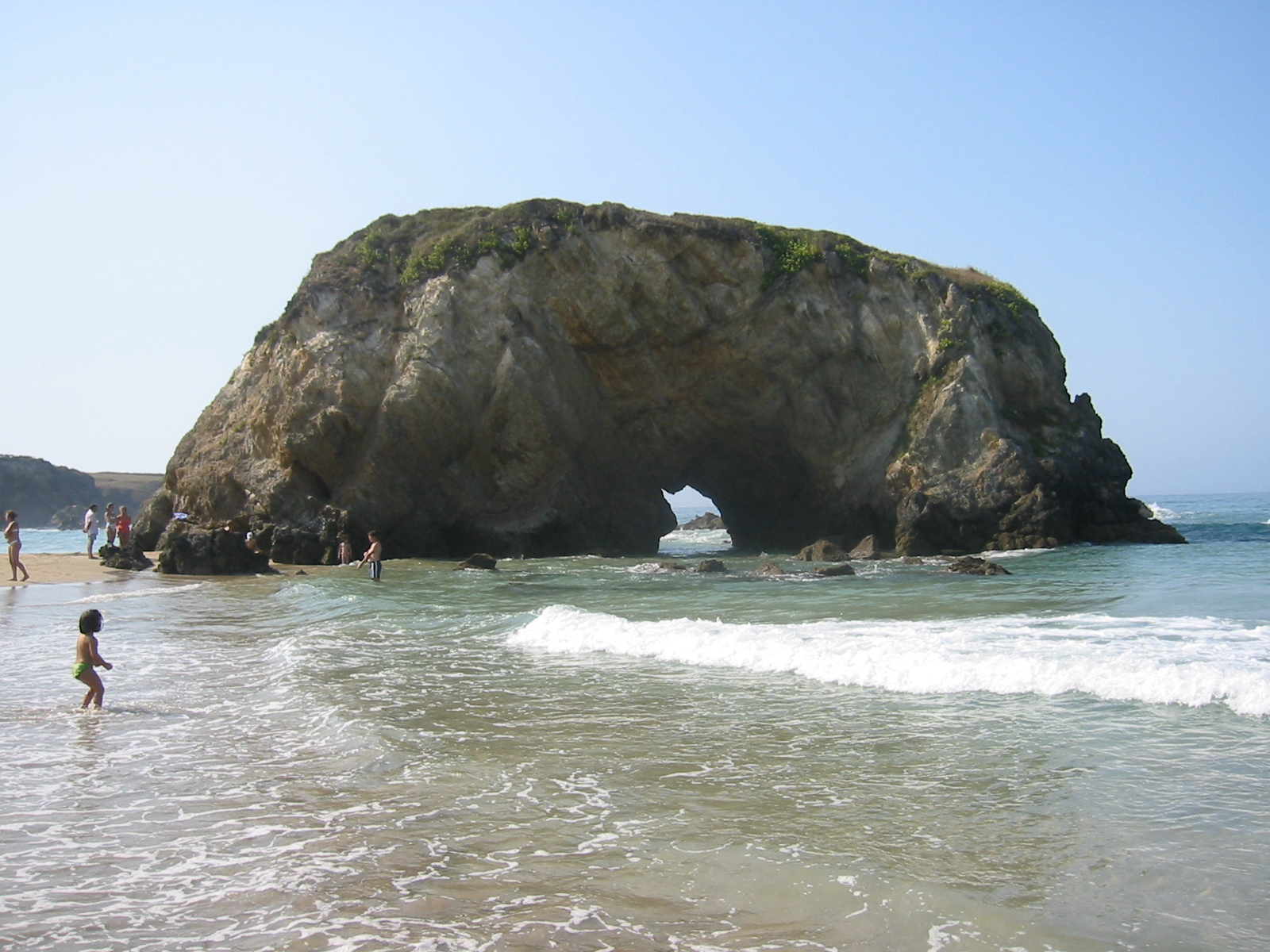
Penarronda Beach

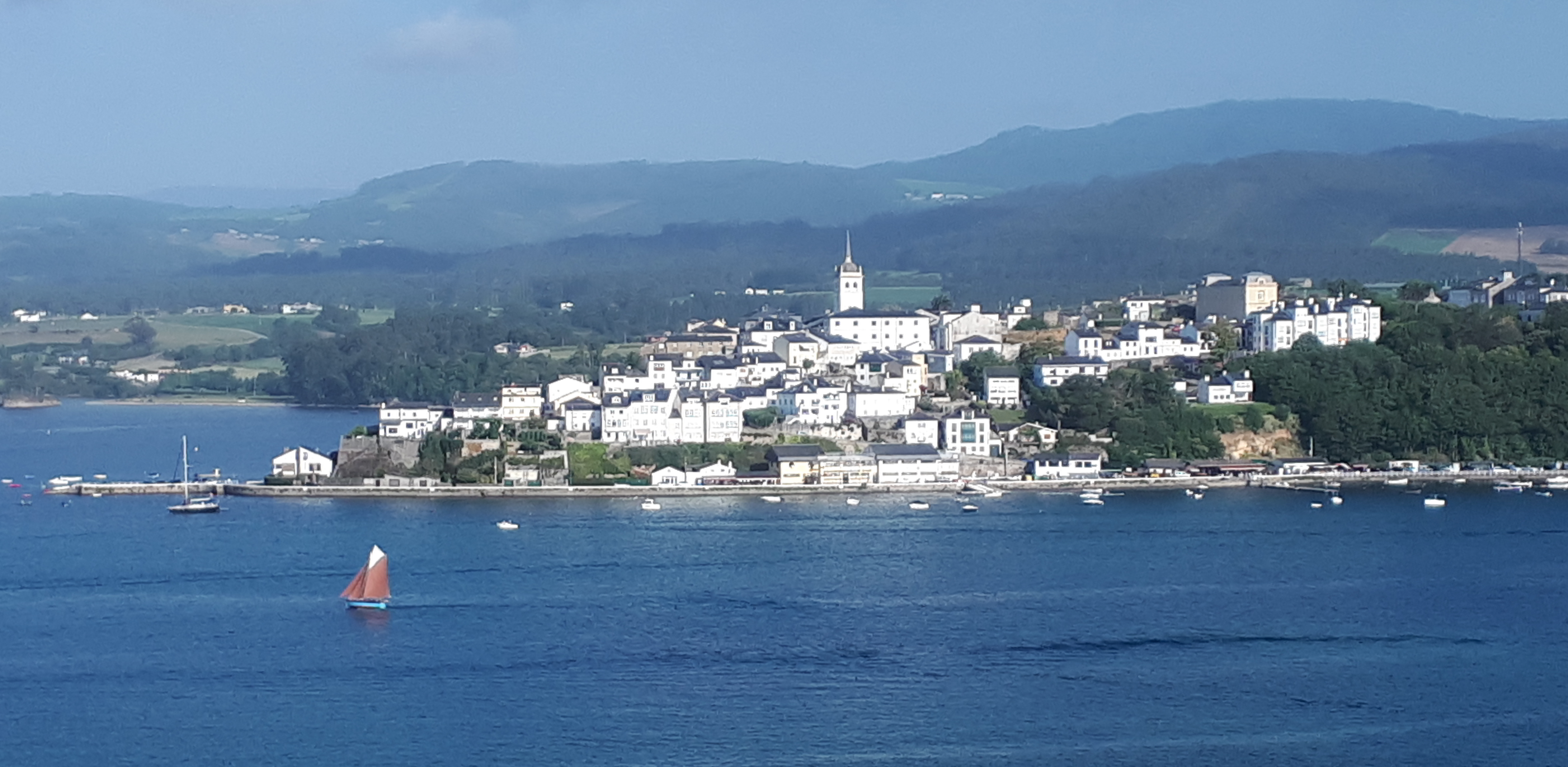
Castropol seen from Ribadeo.

== See also ==
- List of municipalities in Asturias
