= Linares =

Linares may refer to:

== People ==
- Fernando de Alencastre, 1st Duke of Linares (1641–1717), Spanish nobleman and military officer; viceroy of New Spain from 1711 to 1716
- Andreu Linares (born 1975), Spanish futsal player
- Art Linares, American politician from Connecticut
- Arsenio Linares y Pombo (1848–1914), Spanish military officer and government official
- Asunción Linares (1921–2005), Spanish paleontologist
- Carmen Linares, stage name of Carmen Pacheco Rodríguez (born 1951). Spanish flamenco singer
- Emilio Herrera Linares (1879–1967), Spanish military engineer; president of the Spanish government-in-exile from 1960 to 1962
- Francisco Linares Alcántara (1825–1878), Venezuelan politician; president of Venezuela in 1877 and 1878
- François de Linares (1897–1956), French general
- Guillermo Linares (born 1951), U.S. politician from New York
- Jaime Miguel Linares (born 1982), Angolan footballer
- Joan Linares (born 1975), Spanish futsal player
- Jorge Linares (born 1985), Venezuelan boxer
- José Antonio González Linares (born 1946), Spanish road cyclist
- José María Linares (1808–1861), Bolivian politician; president of Bolivia, 1857–1861
- Jose L. Linares (born 1953), U.S. federal judge
- Julio Linares (1930–1993), Panamanian-U.S. jurist, politician, and historian
- Luisa-Maria Linares (1915–1986), Spanish writer
- María Teresa Linares Savio (1920–2021), Cuban musicologist, ethnographer, and researcher of Cuban music
- Marta Linares (disambiguation), several people
- Miguel Linares (born 1982), Spanish footballer
- Nicolás Linares (born 1996), Argentine footballer
- Olga F. Linares (1936–2014), Panamanian–U.S. anthropologist and archaeologist
- Omar Linares (born 1967), Cuban baseball player
- Pastor Linares (born 1971), Venezuelan road cyclist
- Pedro Linares (1906–1992), Mexican artist
- Roberto Linares (born 1986), Cuban footballer
- Rodrigo Linares (born 1995), Argentine footballer
- Fernando Borrego Linares, birth name of Polo Montañez (1955–2002), Cuban singer and songwriter
- Rebeca Linares (born 1983), Spanish pornographic actress
- Rodney Linares (born 1977), Dominican-American baseball coach
- Rogelio Linares (1909–?), Cuban baseball player
- Rufino Linares (1951–1998), Dominican MLB baseball player
- Steven Linares, Gibraltarian teacher, trade unionist, barrister and politician

== Places ==
=== Bolivia ===
- José María Linares Province, Potosí Department

=== Chile ===
- Linares, Chile, a city in the Maule Region
  - Linares Airport, a public use airport located near Linares, Chile
  - Estación Linares, a railway station in Linares, Chile
- Linares Province, a province in the Maule Region

=== Colombia ===
- Linares, Nariño, a city in the Nariño Department

=== Mexico ===
- Linares, Nuevo León, a city in the state of Nuevo León

=== Spain ===
- Linares, Jaén, a city in the province of Jaén, Andalusia
- Linares (Allande), a parish in Allande, Asturias
- Linares (Proaza), a parish in Proaz, Asturias
- Linares (San Martín), a parish in San Martín del Rey Aurelio, Asturias
- Linares (Salas), a parish in Salas, Asturias
- Linares (Ribadesella), a parish in Ribadesella, Asturias
- Linares del Acebo, a parish in Cangas del Narcea, Asturias
- Linares de Mora, a town in the province of Teruel, Aragón
- Linares de Riofrío, a municipality in the province of Salamanca, Castile and León

== Other uses ==
- CD Linares, a football team in Linares, Jaén, Spain
- Linares Deportivo, a football team in Linares, Jaén, Spain
- Linares CF, a football club in Linares, Jaén, Spain
- Deportes Linares, a football team in Linares, Chile
- Linares International Chess Tournament, Linares, Jaén, Spain
- Palace of Linares, Madrid, Spain

== See also ==
- Diocese of Linares (disambiguation)
