= Valledor =

Valledor may refer to:

== People ==
- Jacinto Valledor (1744–1809), Spanish composer
- Leo Valledor (1936–1989), Filipino-American painter

== Other uses ==
- Lo Valledor metro station, metro station in Chile
- San Martín del Valledor, parish in Spain
- San Salvador del Valledor, parish in Spain
