= Margarita Xirgu =

Spanish actress (1888–1969)

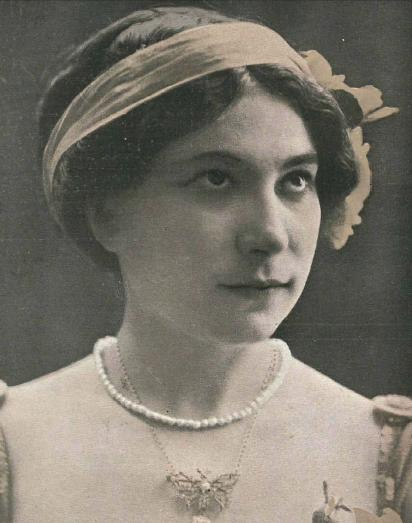
- Xirgu in 1910
- Born: Margarita Xirgu Subirá; 18 June 1888; Molins de Rei, Barcelona, Kingdom of Spain
- Died: 25 April 1969 (aged 80); Maldonado, Uruguay
- Resting place: Molins de Rei, Barcelona, Spain
- Other name: Margarida Xirgu
- Occupations: Actress; director
- Spouse: Josep Arnall (m. 1910; died 1936)

Margarita Xirgu Subirá (Spanish pronunciation: [maɾgaˈɾita ˈxiɾɣu suβiˈɾa] Catalan: Margarida Xirgu i Subirà [məɾɣəˈɾiðə ˈʃiɾɣu j suβiˈɾa]; 18 June 1888 – 25 April 1969) was a Spanish stage actress, who was greatly popular throughout her country and Latin America. A friend of the poet Federico García Lorca, she was forced into exile during Francisco Franco's dictatorship of Spain, but continued her work in the Spanish-speaking Americas. Notable plays in which she appeared include Como tú me deseas, La casa de Bernarda Alba, and Mariana Pineda.

An opera, Ainadamar, by the composer Osvaldo Golijov and playwright David Henry Hwang, based on Xirgu's life and her association with Lorca, was premiered in 2003. A recording of the work released in 2006 on the Deutsche Grammophon label (Catalog #642902) won the 2007 Grammy Award for Best Classical Contemporary Composition and Best Opera Recording.

== Early and personal life ==
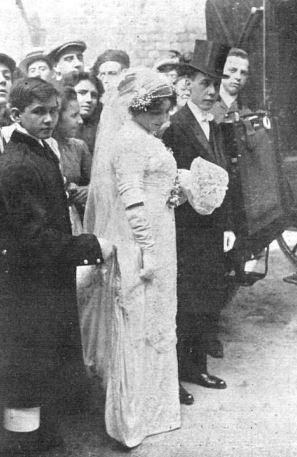
Xirgu and Arnall on their wedding day

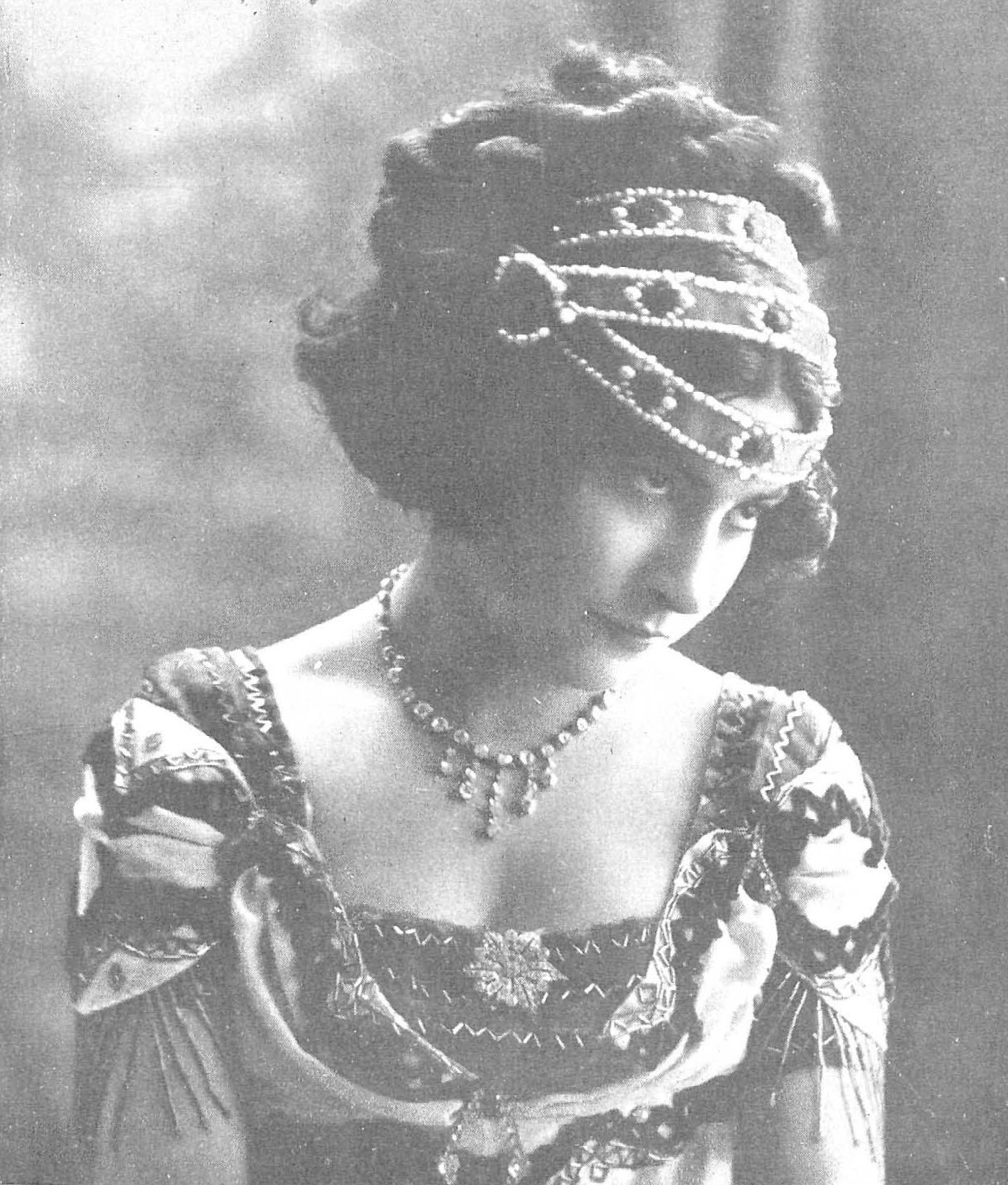
Xirgu in 1911

Born in Molins de Rei in 1888, her family moved first to Girona in 1890 and finally to Barcelona in 1896. In 1910 she married Josep Arnall.

== Career ==
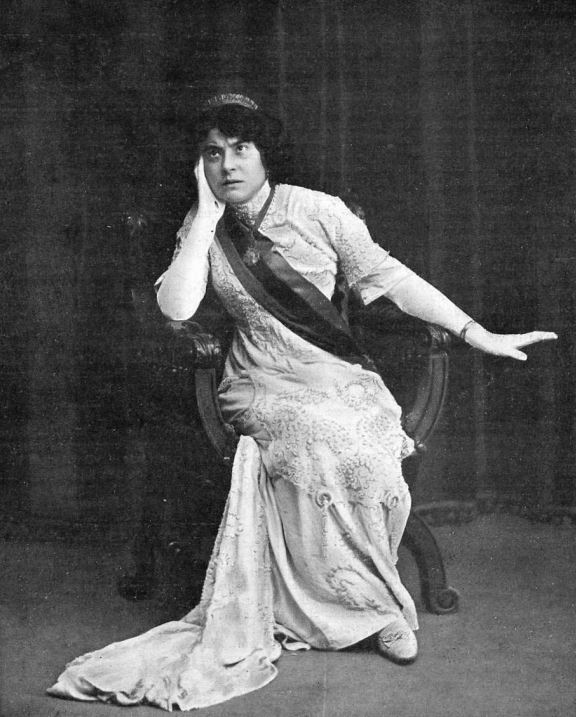
Xirgu as La reina jove (1911)

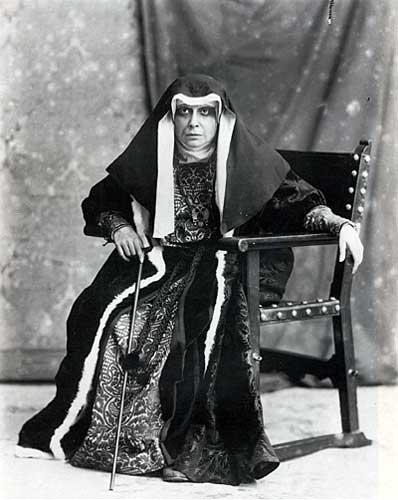
Xirgu in Santa Juana de Castilla by Benito Pérez Galdós (1918)

Xirgu's first theater work was in 1906 with the Blanca character in Mar i cel, at the Teatre Romea. In 1908, she was really successful with Joventut de príncep at the Teatre Principal. After that, in 1909, she began her film career with Guzmán el bueno. In 1911 Àngel Guimerà wrote La reina jove for her, and that year she created her own theater company. In 1912 a Buenos Aires businessman contracted her for working in South America.

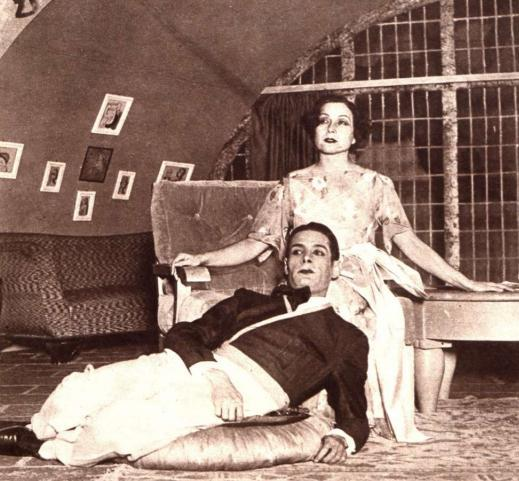
Xirgu and Pedro López Lagar in La sirena varada (1934)

In 1934, she played the mermaid in La sirena varada by Alejandro Casona. She starred in the early film version of García Lorca's Bodas de sangre, filmed in February–March 1938, the only film version of a García Lorca play to star an actress who was a personal friend of the author and who had appeared in his works onstage. It is Ms. Xirgu's only sound film, and it has never been shown on American television or released on video. It was first shown on Argentine television in January 1966.

== Death and legacy ==
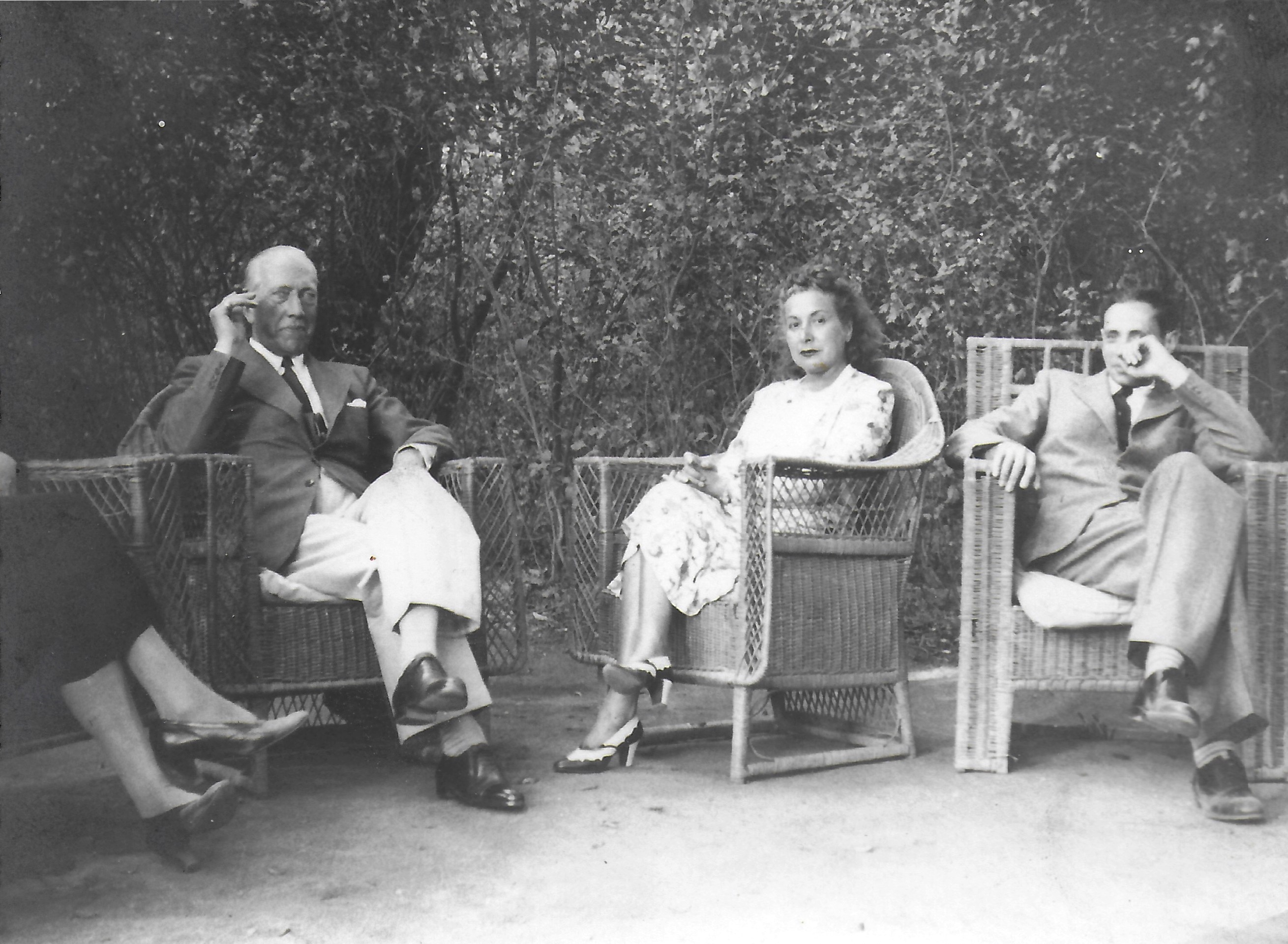
Xirgu with Miquel Ortín in Punta Ballena in the 1960s

Xirgu died in Maldonado in 1969, after she had become a Uruguayan citizen according to civil rights granted for exiles. In 1988 the Catalan government repatriated her remains, which are now buried in her native town of Molins de Rei.

A biography of Xirgu was written by Catalan author Antonina Rodrigo. In 2018, the New York Times published a belated obituary for her.
