= Villavaser =

Villavaser Viḷḷabaser
- Parish
- Location within Spain
- Country: Spain
- Autonomous community: Asturias
- Province: Asturias
- Municipality: Allande

Area
  - Total: 3.94 km^{2} (1.52 sq mi)

Population (2024)
  - Total: 54
  - Density: 14/km^{2} (35/sq mi)
- Time zone: UTC+1 (CET)

Villavaser (Asturian: Viḷḷabaser) is a parish (administrative division) in Allande, a municipality within the province and autonomous community of Asturias, in northern Spain. It is situated 5 km (3.1 mi) from the capital, Pola de Allande.

The elevation is 540 m (1,770 ft) above sea level. It is 3.94 km^{2} (1.52 sq mi) in size. The population was 54 as of January 1, 2024. The postal code is 33889.

== Villages and hamlets ==
- Figueras
- Piniella
- Riovena
- Villavaser (Viḷḷabaser)
