= Villar de Sapos =

Villar de Sapos Viḷḷar de Sapos
- Parish
- Location within Spain
- Coordinates: 43°12′17″N 6°35′36″W
- Country: Spain
- Autonomous community: Asturias
- Province: Asturias
- Municipality: Allande

Area
  - Total: 2.42 km^{2} (0.93 sq mi)

Population (2024)
  - Total: 15
  - Density: 6.2/km^{2} (16/sq mi)
- Time zone: UTC+1 (CET)

Villar de Sapos (Asturian: Viḷḷar de Sapos) is a parish in Allande, a municipality within the province and autonomous community of Asturias, in northern Spain. It is situated 18 km (11 mi) from the capital, Pola de Allande

The elevation is 560 m (1,840 ft) above sea level. It is 2.42 km^{2} (0.93 sq mi) in size. The population was 15 as of January 1, 2024. The postal code is 33890.

== Villages and hamlets ==
- Almoño
- Selce
- Villar de Sapos (Viḷḷar de Sapos)
