= Celon =

Celon may refer to:

In places

- Celon, Indre, commune of the Indre departement in France
- Celón, a parish in Allande, a municipality within the province of Asturias, in northern Spain

In fiction:

- Celon (Middle-earth), a river in J. R. R. Tolkien's Middle-earth writings
