= San Emiliano (Allande) =

San Emiliano Santo Miyao
- Parish
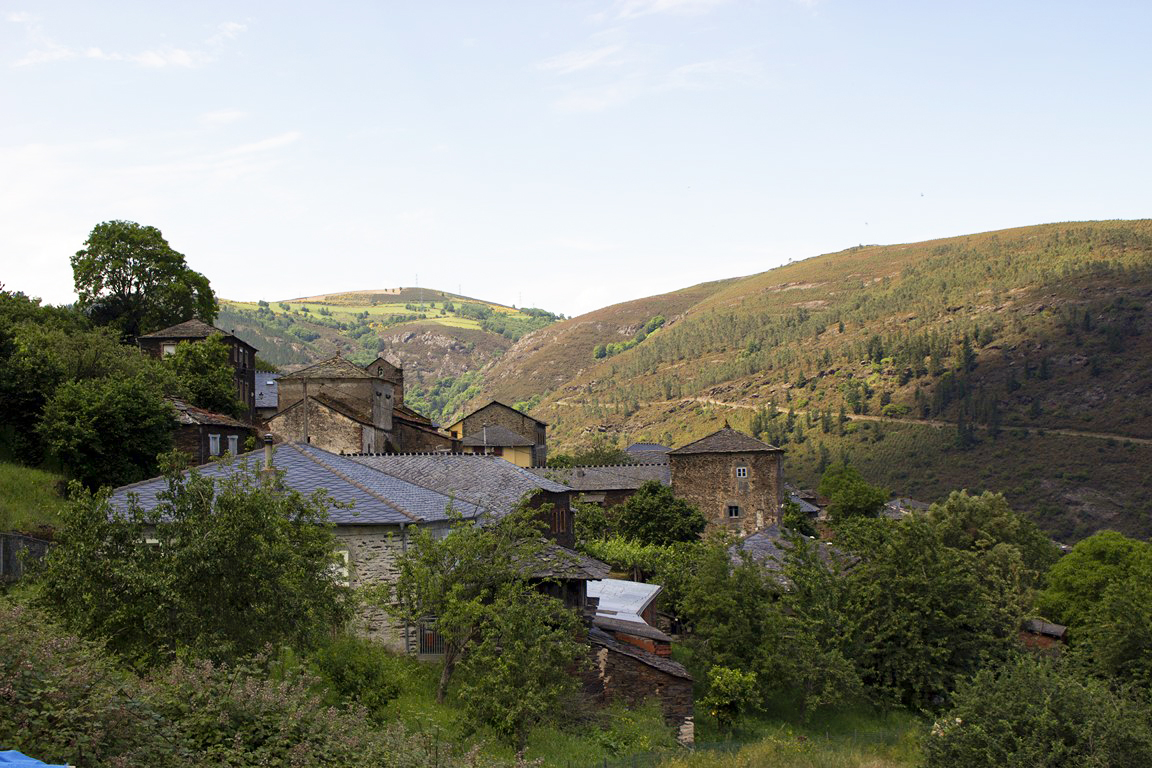

- Location within Spain
- Coordinates: 43.25722°N 6.83361°W
- Country: Spain
- Autonomous community: Asturias
- Province: Asturias
- Municipality: Allande

Area
  - Total: 25.34 km^{2} (9.78 sq mi)

Population (2024)
  - Total: 44
  - Density: 1.7/km^{2} (4.5/sq mi)
- Time zone: UTC+1 (CET)

San Emiliano (in Galician-Asturian: Santo Miyao) is a parish (administrative division) in Allande, a municipality within the province and autonomous community of Asturias, in northern Spain. It is situated 37 km (23 mi) from the capital, Pola de Allande.

The elevation is 320 m (1,050 ft) above sea level. It is 25.34 km^{2} (9.78 sq mi) in size, with a population of 44 as of January 1, 2024. The postal code is 33885.

== Villages and hamlets ==
- Bevarasao (Bevaraso)
- Bojo (Boxo)
- Buslavín (Busllavín)
- Ema
- Fresnedo (Freisnedo)
- Murias
- La Quintana (A Quintá)
- Vallinas (Vallías)
- Villadecabo
- San Emiliano (Santo Miyao)
