= Villagrufe =

Villagrufe Viḷḷagrufe
- Parish
- Location within Spain
- Coordinates: 43.25°N 6.6°W
- Country: Spain
- Autonomous community: Asturias
- Province: Asturias
- Municipality: Allande

Area
  - Total: 11.81 km^{2} (4.56 sq mi)

Population (2024)
  - Total: 107
  - Density: 9.06/km^{2} (23.5/sq mi)
- Time zone: UTC+1 (CET)

Villagrufe (Asturian: Viḷḷagrufe) is a parish (administrative division) in Allande, a municipality within the province and autonomous community of Asturias, in northern Spain. It is situated 5 km (3.1 mi) from the capital, Pola de Allande

The elevation is 640 m (2,100 ft) above sea level. It is 11.81 km^{2} (4.56 sq mi) in size. The population was 107 as of January 1, 2024. The postal code is 33889.

== Villages and hamlets ==
- Carballedo
- Prada
- Pradiella
- Santullano
- Tamuño
- Villagrufe
