= Villaverde (Allande) =

Villaverde Viḷḷaverde
- Parish
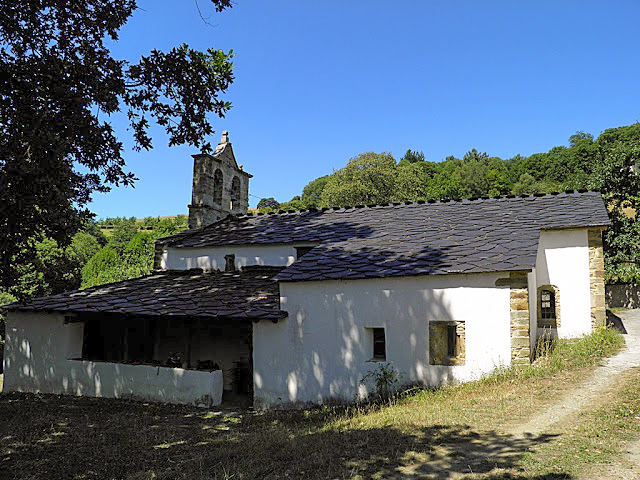

- Location within Spain
- Coordinates: 43.233333°N 6.6°W
- Country: Spain
- Autonomous community: Asturias
- Province: Asturias
- Municipality: Allande

Area
  - Total: 20.19 km^{2} (7.80 sq mi)

Population (2024)
  - Total: 70
  - Density: 3.5/km^{2} (9.0/sq mi)
- Time zone: UTC+1 (CET)

Villaverde (Asturian: Viḷḷaverde) is a parish (administrative division), a municipality within the province and autonomous community of Asturias, in northern Spain. It is situated 11 km (6.8 mi) from the capital, Pola de Allande.

The elevation is 700 m (2,300 ft) above sea level. It is 20.19 km^{2} (7.80 sq mi) in size. The population was 70 as of January 1, 2024. The postal code is 33890.

== Villages and hamlets ==
- Abaniella
- Lantigo
- Peruyeda
- Santa Eulalia
- El Valle
- Villaverde (Viḷḷaverde)
