= Santa Coloma, Asturias =

Santa Coloma Santa Colomba
- Parish
- Location within Spain
- Coordinates: 43°17′47.44″N 6°43′29.25″W
- Country: Spain
- Autonomous community: Asturias
- Province: Asturias
- Municipality: Allande

Area
  - Total: 43.8 km^{2} (16.9 sq mi)

Population (2024)
  - Total: 46
  - Density: 1.1/km^{2} (2.7/sq mi)
- Time zone: UTC+1 (CET)

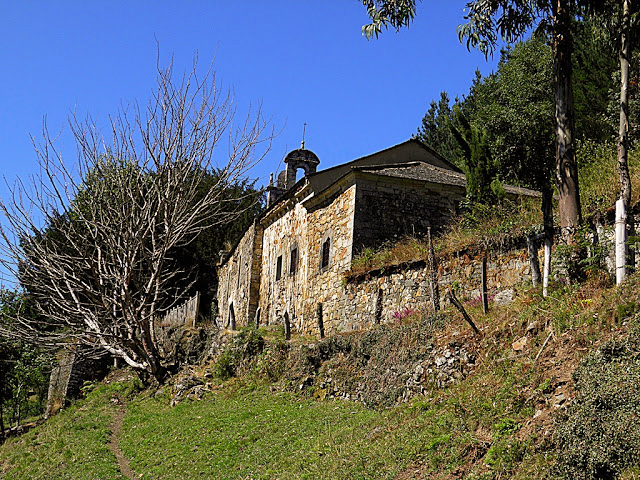
Santa Coloma, Allande (Asturias)

Santa Coloma (Asturian: Santa Colomba) is a parish (administrative division) in Allande, a municipality within the province and autonomous community of Asturias, in northern Spain. It is situated 19 km (12 mi) from the capital, Pola de Allande.

The elevation is 760 m (2,490 ft) above sea level. It is 43.8 km^{2} (16.9 sq mi) in size. The population was 46 as of January 1, 2024. The postal code is 33888.

== Villages and hamlets ==
- Arbeyales Bendón (Arbiales)
- Bendón
- Bustel
- Cabral
- El Caleyo
- Is
- Llaneces (Llaeces)
- Meres
- Monón
- Muriellos (Murellos)
- Penouta
- Pontenova (A Pontenova)
- La Porquera (A Porqueira)
- El Rebollo (El Rebollu)
- El Sellón
- Vallinadosa (Valladosa)
- Santa Coloma (Santa Colomba)
