= Banduxu =

- Parish
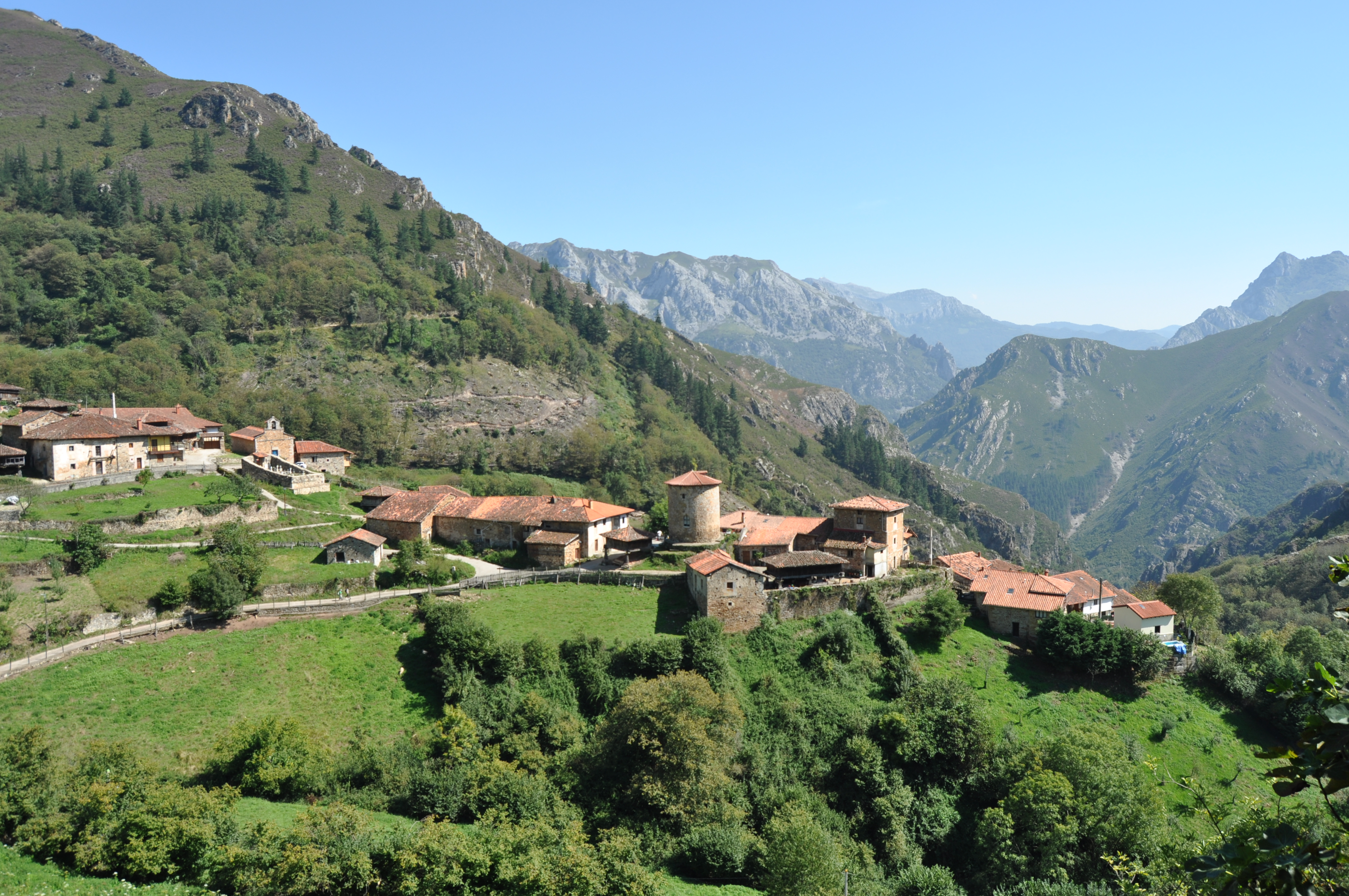

- Location within Spain
- Coordinates: 43°13′12.23″N 6°4′18.45″W
- Country: Spain
- Autonomous Community: Asturias
- Municipality: Proaza

Area
  - Total: 4.16 sq mi (10.78 km^{2})

Banduxu is one of eight parishes in Proaza, a municipality within the province and autonomous community of Asturias, in northern Spain.

It is 10.78 km^{2} (4.16 sq mi) in size with a population of 43 (INE 2005). The postal code is 33114.

Banduxu is located at a distance of 11 km from Proaza, the capital of the council.

The church of St. Mary is of medieval origin and underwent reform in the eighteenth century. The palace of Banduxu and its "Tower of Tuñón" or "Tower of Banduxu" is one of the best preserved late medieval defensive towers of Asturias. This building, which also served as a prison and town hall, was declared of cultural interest on 29 October 2009.

== Villages ==
- El Barreiru
- El Campal
- El Conventu
- La Cuandia
- Entelailesia
- La Fonte l'Achu
- El Gorru
- La Molina
- El Palaciu
- La Pandieḷḷa
- La Reguera
- El Rial
- El Táranu
- El Toral
- El Ventorrillu
- El Casar
- La Morteirona
- El Quizu

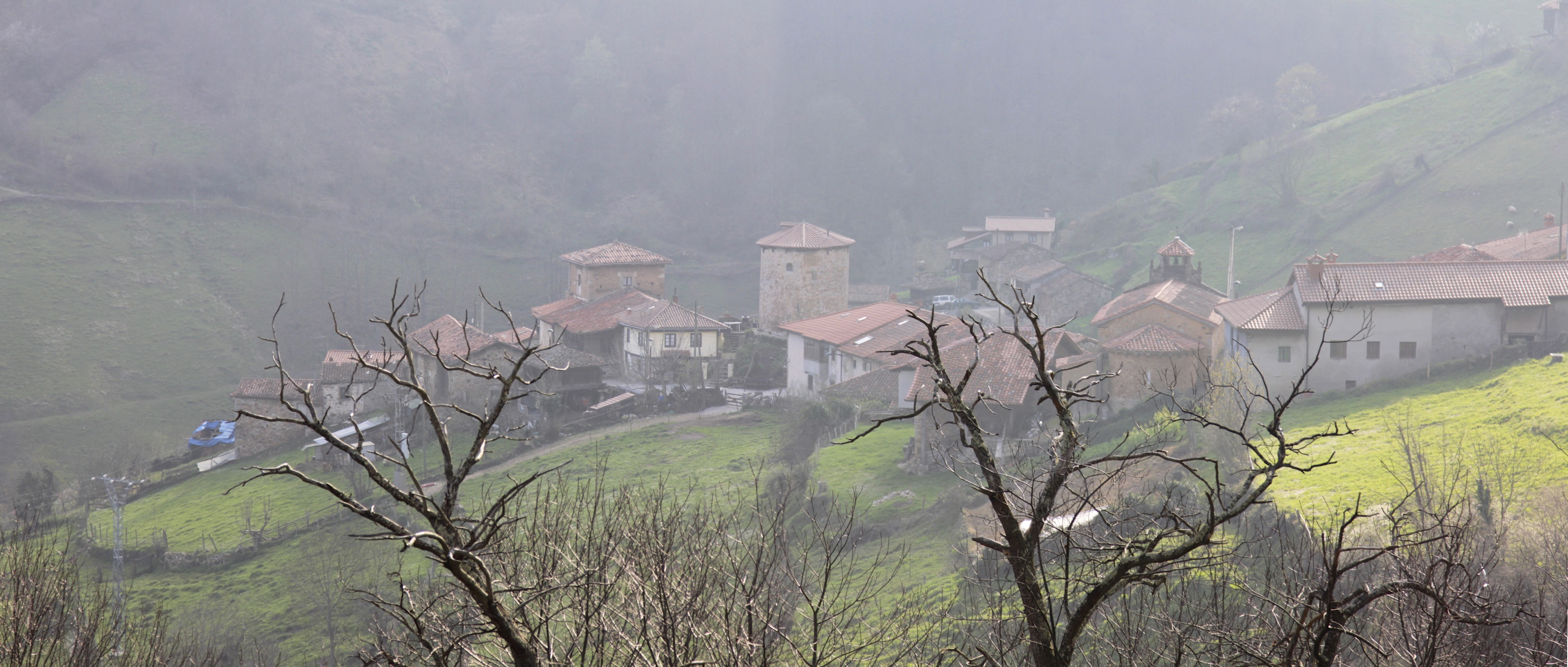
Santa María church and Bandujo medieval Tower
