= San Martín (Proaza) =

Coordinates: 43°14′48.98″N 5°58′31.99″W

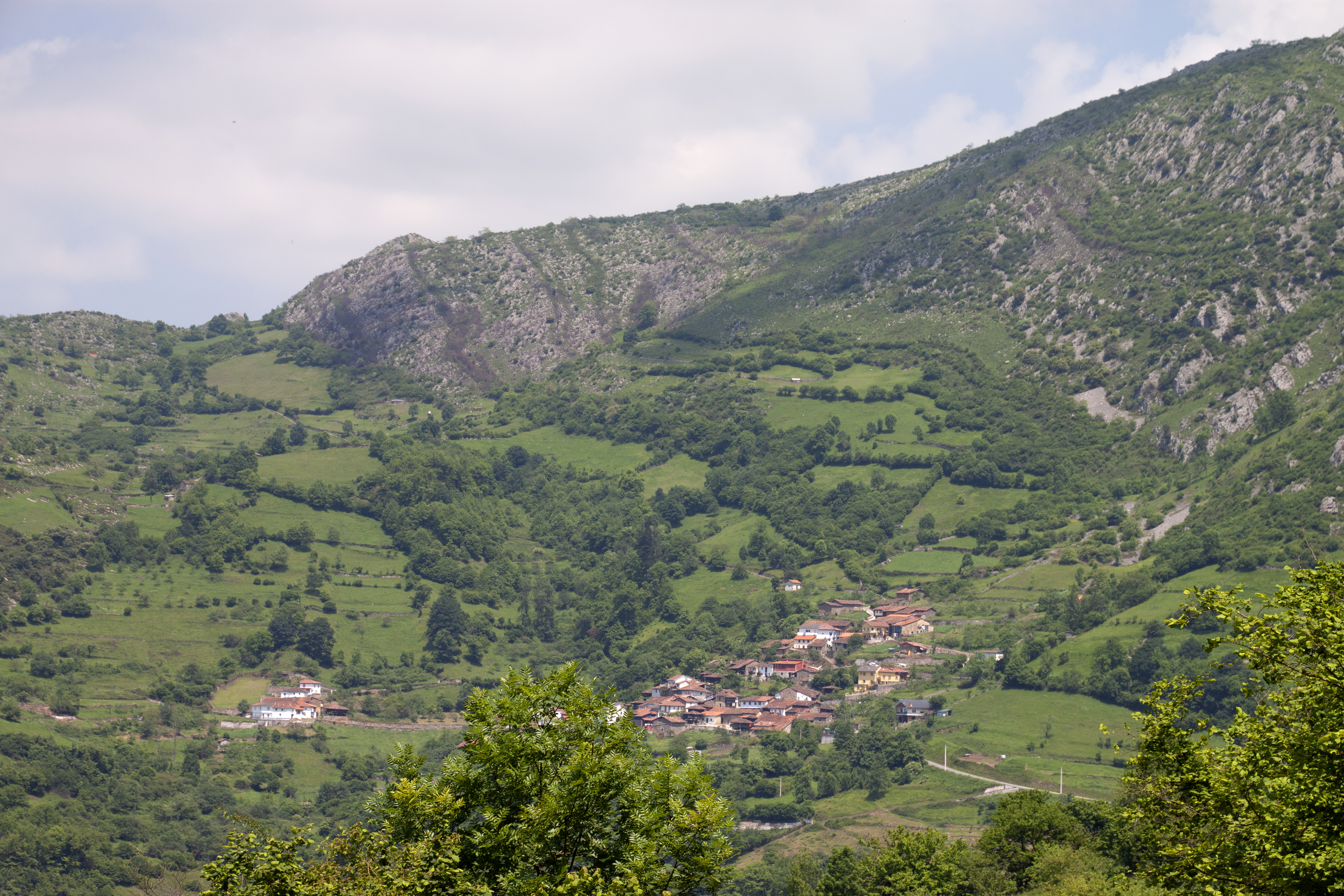
San Martín

San Martín is one of eight parishes in Proaza, a municipality within the province and autonomous community of Asturias, in northern Spain.

It is 14.1 km^{2} (5.4 sq mi) in size with a population of 138 (INE 2005).

== Villages ==
- Samartín
- Serandi
- Villamexín
