= Besullo (Allande) =

- Parish
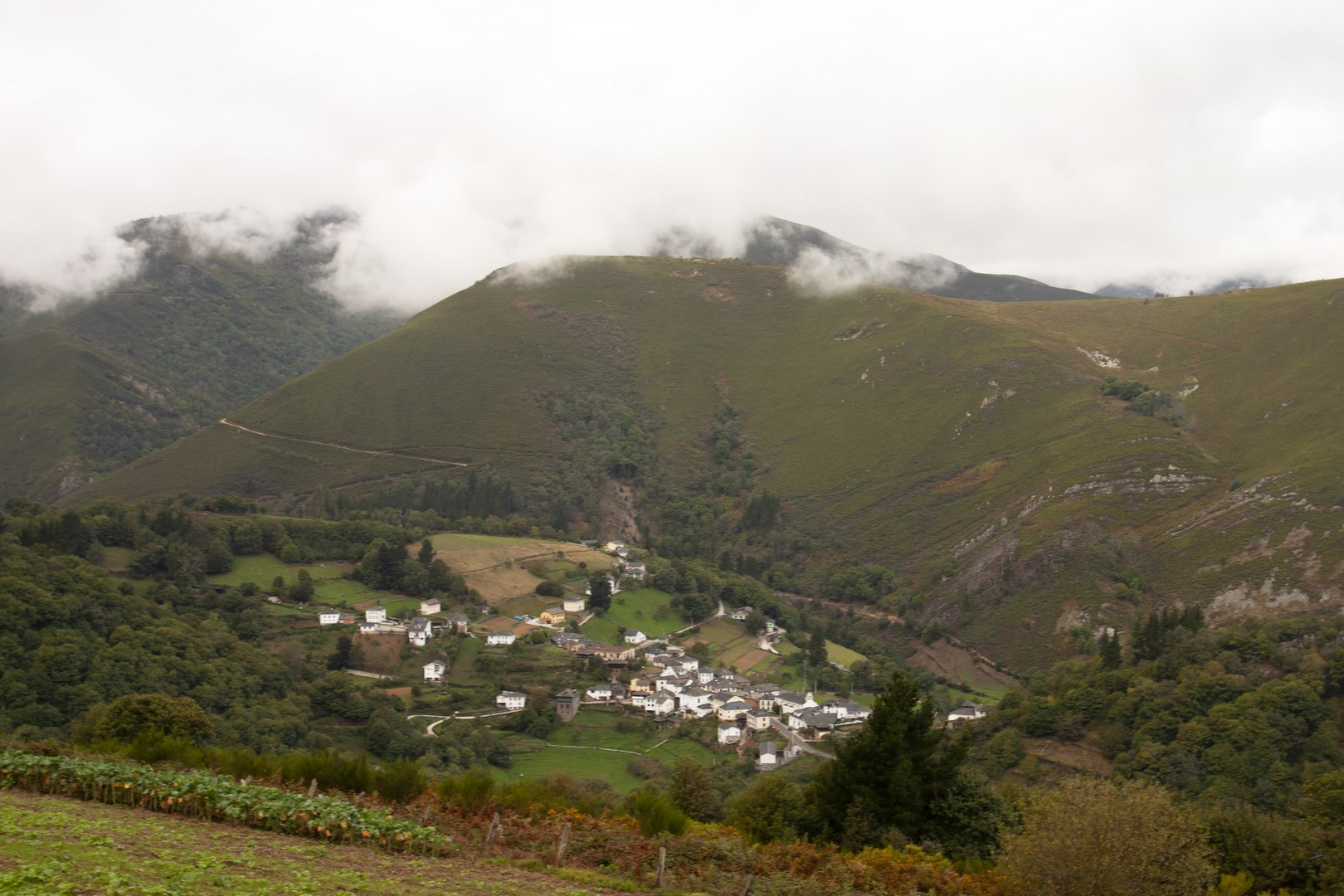

- Location within Spain
- Coordinates: 43°12′00″N 6°37′38″W
- Country: Spain
- Autonomous community: Asturias
- Province: Asturias
- Municipality: Allande

Area
  - Total: 14.14 km^{2} (5.46 sq mi)

Population (2024)
  - Total: 74
  - Density: 5.2/km^{2} (14/sq mi)
- Time zone: UTC+1 (CET)

Besullo (Asturian: Bisuyu) is a parish (administrative division) in Allande, a municipality within the province and autonomous community of Asturias, in northern Spain.

It is 14.14 km^{2} (5.46 sq mi) in size. The population was 74 as of January 1, 2024.

== Villages and hamlets ==
- Comba
- Forniellas ("Furniellas")
- Fuentes ("As Fontes")
- Iboyo ("Iboyu")
- Noceda

== Notable people ==
Alejandro Casona, a Spanish dramatist and playwright, was born in Besullo.
