= Iglesia de San Esteban (Sograndio) =

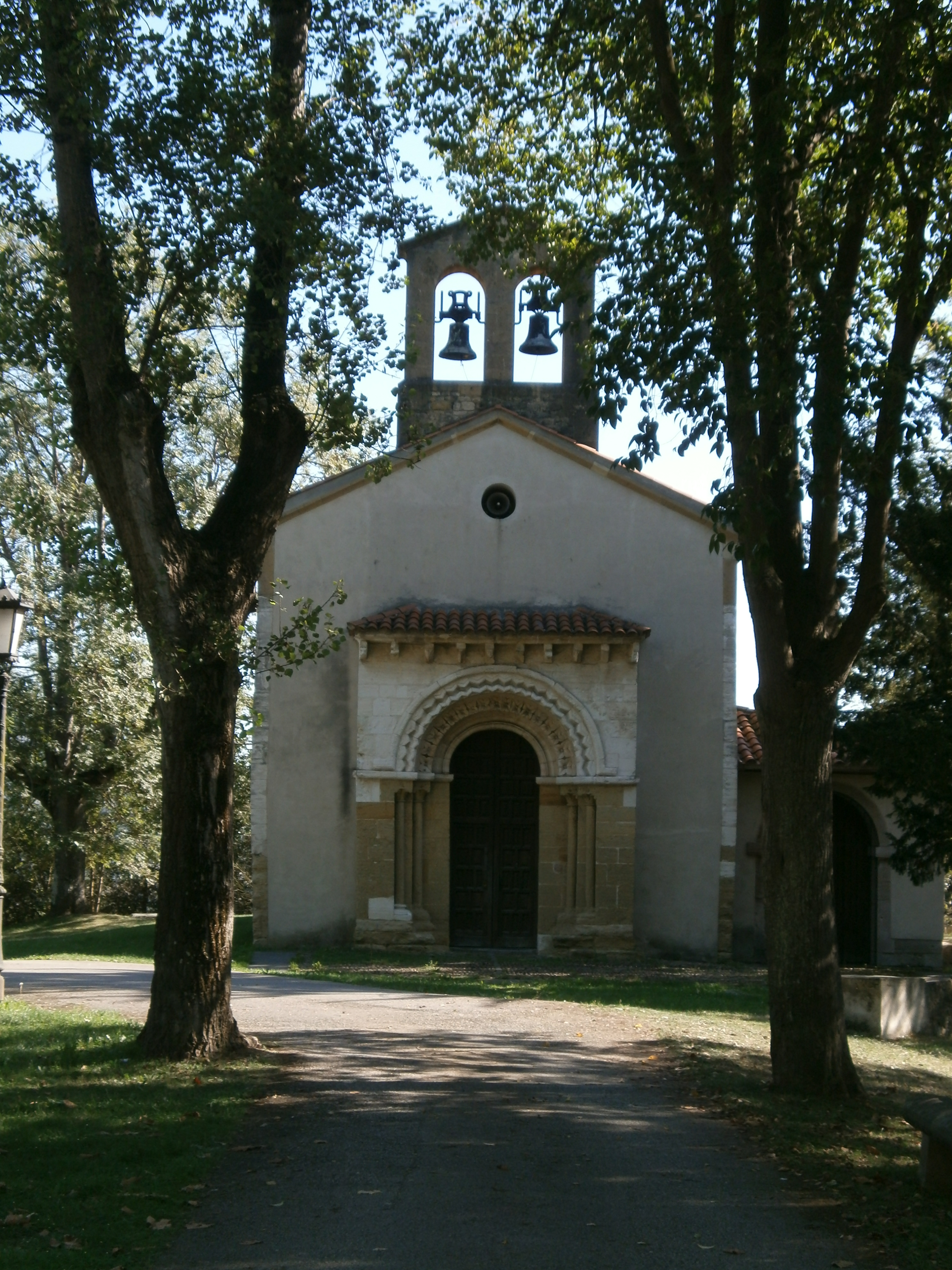
- Iglesia de San Esteban (Sograndio)
- 43.347222°N 5.935556°W
- Location: Asturias, Spain

Iglesia de San Esteban (Sograndio) is a church in Sograndio, Asturias, Spain. It was established in the 12th century.

== See also ==
- Asturian art
- Catholic Church in Spain
