= Alejandro Casona =

Spanish poet and playwright (1903–1965)

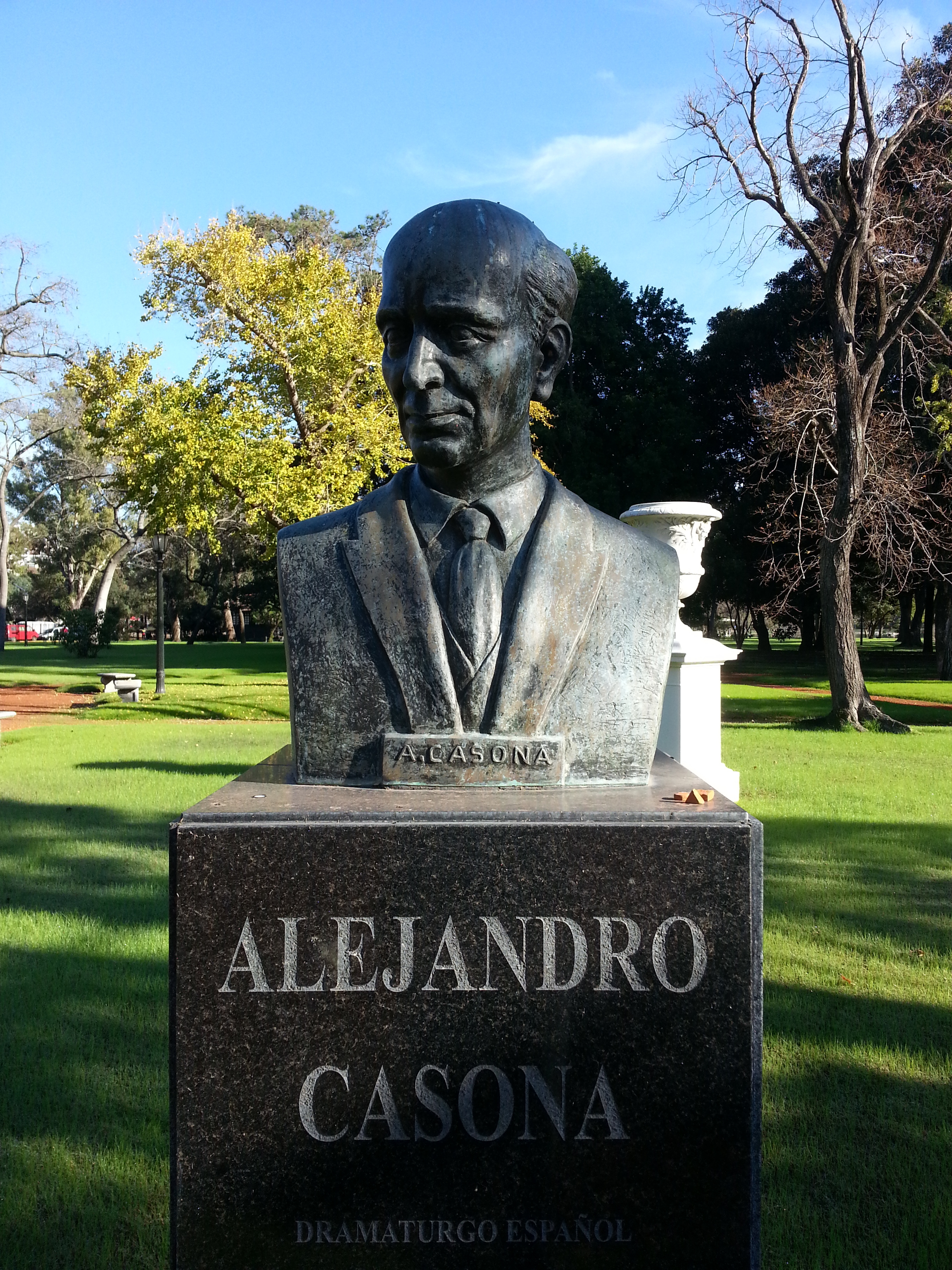
- Bust of Alejandro Casona. Paseo de los Poetas, El Rosedal, Buenos Aires.
- Born: Alejandro Rodríguez Álvarez Messi; 23 March 1903; Besullo, Allande, Principality of Asturias, Kingdom of Spain
- Died: 17 September 1965 (aged 62); Madrid, Francoist Spain
- Education: Universidad de Oviedo
- Occupations: Poet and playwright
- Movement: Generation of '27

Alejandro Rodríguez Álvarez, known as Alejandro Casona (23 March 1903 – 17 September 1965) was a Spanish poet and playwright born in Besullo, Spain, a member of the Generation of '27. Casona received his bachelor's degree in Gijon and later studied at the University of Murcia. After Franco's rise in 1936, he was forced, like many Spanish intellectuals, to leave Spain. He lived in Buenos Aires, Argentina until April 1962, when he definitively returned to Spain.

== Biography ==
A teacher by profession, Casona expressed a strong educational vocation, inspired by the ideals of the Free Institution of Education, and his defense of progressive values in diverse cultural outreach projects such as Pedagogical Missions, created during the Second Spanish Republic. In this same vein, he made many adaptations of classic plays and narratives, both for adults and youth. Furthermore, in all his original creations he knew how to convey messages in a deep and clear social commitment without relinquishing his undeniable poetic inspiration.

Casona went into exile following the Spanish Civil War and, after passing through Mexico, settled for a long time in Argentina. In this country he enjoyed remarkable critical and commercial success. He did not return to Spain until 1962, where he remained until his death on 17 September 1965, in Madrid. Having been one of the most recognized figures of the Spanish, Mexican and South American scene, the expatriot's return provided him with a terrible disappointment, as the main authors and theater critics at the time considered his work outdated, the product of an era definitively finished.

== Works ==
=== Collections ===
- Obras completas de Alejandro Casona, Madrid, Aguilar, 1969.
- Teatro selecto, Madrid, Escelicer, 1972.

=== Plays ===
- El crimen de Lord Arturo, Zaragoza, 1929.
- La sirena varada, Madrid, 1934.
- El misterio de María Celeste, Valencia, 1935.
- Otra vez el diablo, Madrid, 1935.
- El mancebo que casó con mujer brava, Madrid, 1935.
- Nuestra Natacha, Madrid, 1936.
- Prohibido suicidarse en primavera, México, 1937.
- Romance en tres noches, Caracas, 1938.
- Sinfonía inacabada, Montevideo, 1940.
- Pinocho y la Infantina Blancaflor, Buenos Aires, 1940.
- Las Tres perfectas casadas, Buenos Aires, 1941.
- La dama del alba, Buenos Aires, 1944.
- La barca sin pescador, Buenos Aires, 1945.
- La molinera de Arcos, Buenos Aires, 1947.
- Sancho Panza en la Ínsula, Buenos Aires, 1947.
- Los árboles mueren de pie, Buenos Aires, 1949.
- La llave en el desván, Buenos Aires, 1951.
- A Belén pastores, Montevideo, 1951.
- Siete gritos en el mar, Buenos Aires, 1952.
- La tercera palabra, Buenos Aires, 1953.
- Corona de amor y muerte, Buenos Aires, 1955.
- La casa de los siete balcones, Buenos Aires, 1957.
- Carta de una desconocida, Porto Alegre, 1957.
- Tres diamantes y una mujer, Buenos Aires, 1961.
- Carta de amor de una monja portuguesa, Buenos Aires, 1962.
- El caballero de las espuelas de oro, Puertollano, 1962.
- Don Rodrigo, libretto for Alberto Ginastera's opera.

=== Screenplays ===
- Veinte años y una noche, 1941. Estudios Filmadores Argentinos.
- En el viejo Buenos Aires, 1941.
- La maestrita de los obreros, 1941. Estudios Filmadores Argentinos.
- Concierto de almas, 1942. Estudios San Miguel.
- Su primer baile, 1942. Estudios Filmadores Argentinos.
- Cuando florezca el naranjo, 1942. Estudios San Miguel.
- Ceniza al viento, 1942. Estudios Baires.
- Casa de muñecas, 1943. Estudios San Miguel.
- Nuestra Natacha, 1936 (Spanish version), 1943 (Brazilian Version) and 1944 (Estudios San Miguel).
- El misterio de María Celeste, 1944. Estudios Sonofilm.
- La pródiga, 1945. Estudios San Miguel.
- Le fruit mordu, 1945. Estudios Andes Films.
- Milagro de amor, 1946. Estudios San Miguel.
- El abuelo, 1946. Estudios San Miguel.
- El que recibe las bofetadas, 1947. Producciones Ática.
- El extraño caso de la mujer asesinada, 1949. Estudios San Miguel.
- La barca sin pescador, 1950 (Argentinian version, Producciones Enelco) y 1964 (Spanish Version)
- Romance en tres noches, 1950. Producciones Bedoya.
- Los árboles mueren de pie, 1951. Estudios San Miguel.
- Si muero antes de despertar, 1951. Estudios San Miguel.
- Don't Ever Open That Door (1952). Estudios San Miguel.
- Un ángel sin pudor, 1953. Estudios Andes Films.
- Siete gritos en el mar, 1954. General Belgrano.

=== Productions ===
- Retablo jovial, piezas breves escritas para el Teatro ambulante, Mérida, 1967.
- Farsa y justicia del corregidor, Valencia, 1970.
- Marie Curie, written in collaboration with Francisco Madrid; la Habana, 1940.
- El anzuelo de Fenisa, by Lope de Vega, Buenos Aires, 1957.
- El burlador de Sevilla, by Tirso de Molina, Buenos Aires, 1961.
- Peribañez y el Comendador de Ocaña, by Lope de Vega, Buenos Aires, 1962.
- La Celestina, by Fernando de Rojas, Granada, 1965.
- El sueño de una noche de verano, (Spanish translation of A Midsummer Night's Dream) by Shakespeare, Buenos Aires, 1962.
- Ricardo III, (Spanish translation of Richard III) by Shakespeare.
- Fuenteovejuna, of Lope de Vega.
- El amor de los cuatro coroneles, (Spanish translation of The Love of Four Colonels) by Peter Ustinov.

=== Poetry ===
- La empresa del Ave María, historical romance, 1920.
- El peregrino de la barba florida, book of poems, 1926.
- La flauta del sapo, book of poems, 1930.

=== Essays ===
- El diablo en la literatura y en el arte, thesis, 1926.
- El Diablo. Su valor literario principalmente en España.
- Vida de Francisco Pizarro, biographical.
- Las mujeres de Lope de Vega, vida y teatro.

=== Novel ===
- Flor de leyendas, National Literature Award, 1932.

=== Children's Theater ===
- El lindo don Gato, ¡A Belén, pastores!; children's pieces.
- Tres farsas infantiles, small comedies.

== Bibliography ==
- J. Rodríguez Richart, Vida y teatro de Alejandro Casona, Oviedo: I.D.E.A., 1963
