= Bustantigo =

- Parish
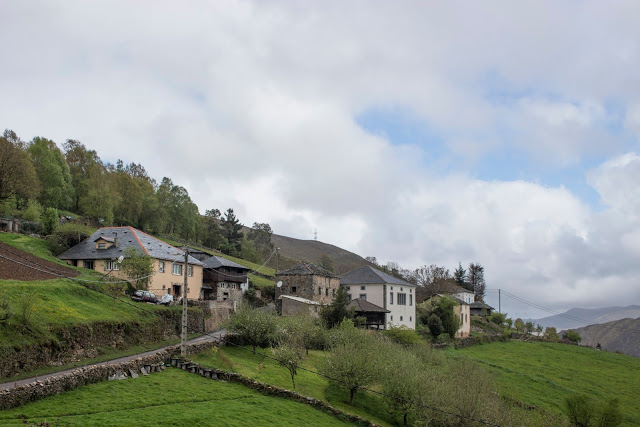

- Location within Spain
- Coordinates: 43.350°N 6.683°W
- Country: Spain
- Autonomous community: Asturias
- Province: Asturias
- Municipality: Allande

Area
  - Total: 15.14 km^{2} (5.85 sq mi)

Population (2024)
  - Total: 18
  - Density: 1.2/km^{2} (3.1/sq mi)
- Time zone: UTC+1 (CET)

Bustantigo is a parish (administrative division) in Allande municipality located within the province and autonomous community of Asturias, in northern Spain. The capital, Pola de Allande, is 23 km (14 mi) away.

While the parish elevation is 720 m (2,360 ft) above sea level, the highest point is Panchón Peak at 1,411 m (4,629 ft), and the lowest point is at the Navia River at 110 m (360 ft). It is 15.14 km^{2} (5.85 sq mi) in size. The population was 18 as of January 1, 2024. The postal code is 33888.

== Villages and hamlets ==
- La Folgueriza ("La Folgueiriza")
- El Plantao ("El Plantáu")
- Bustantigo ("Bustantigu")
