= Proaza =

- Municipality
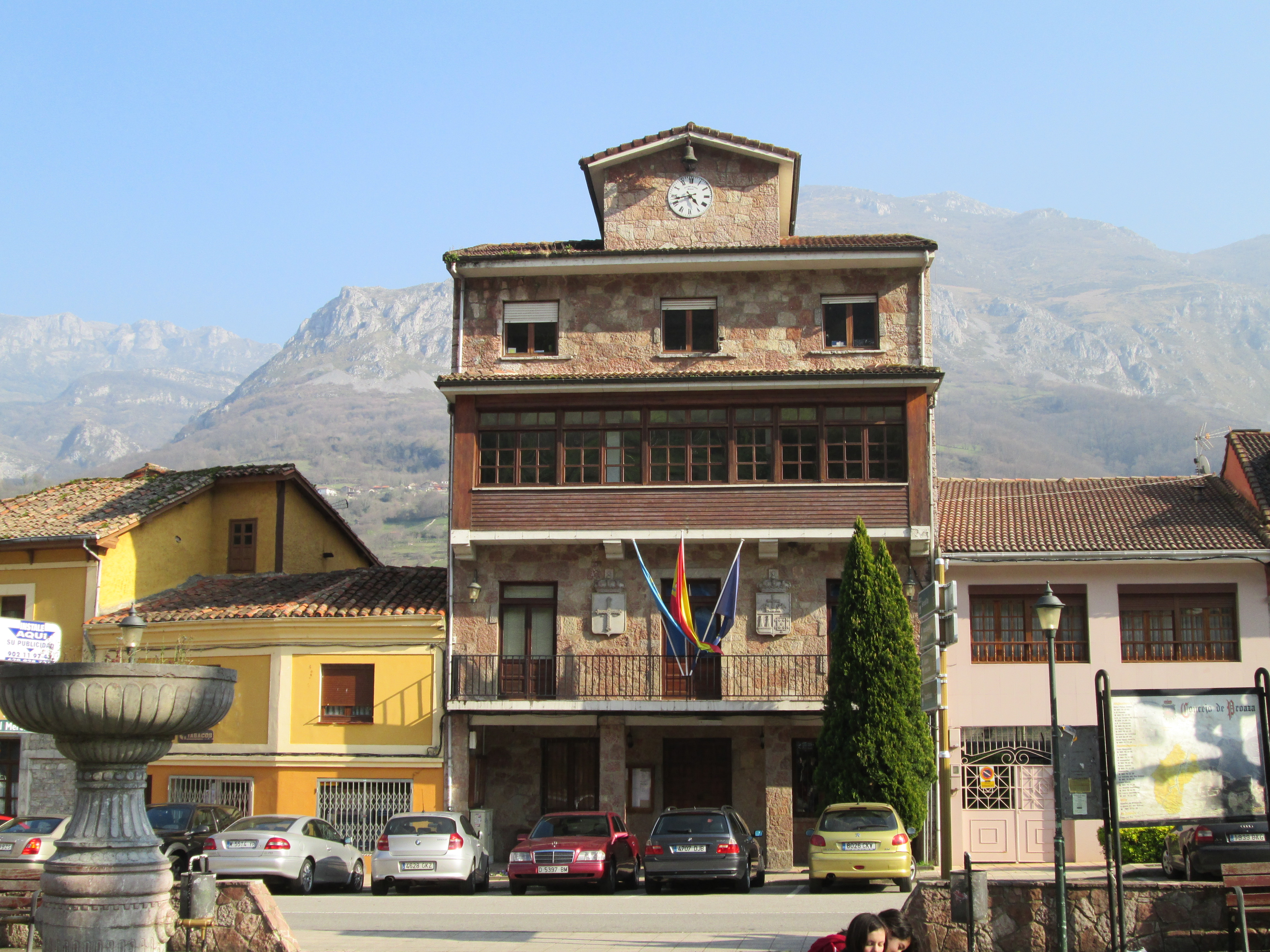
- Town Hall

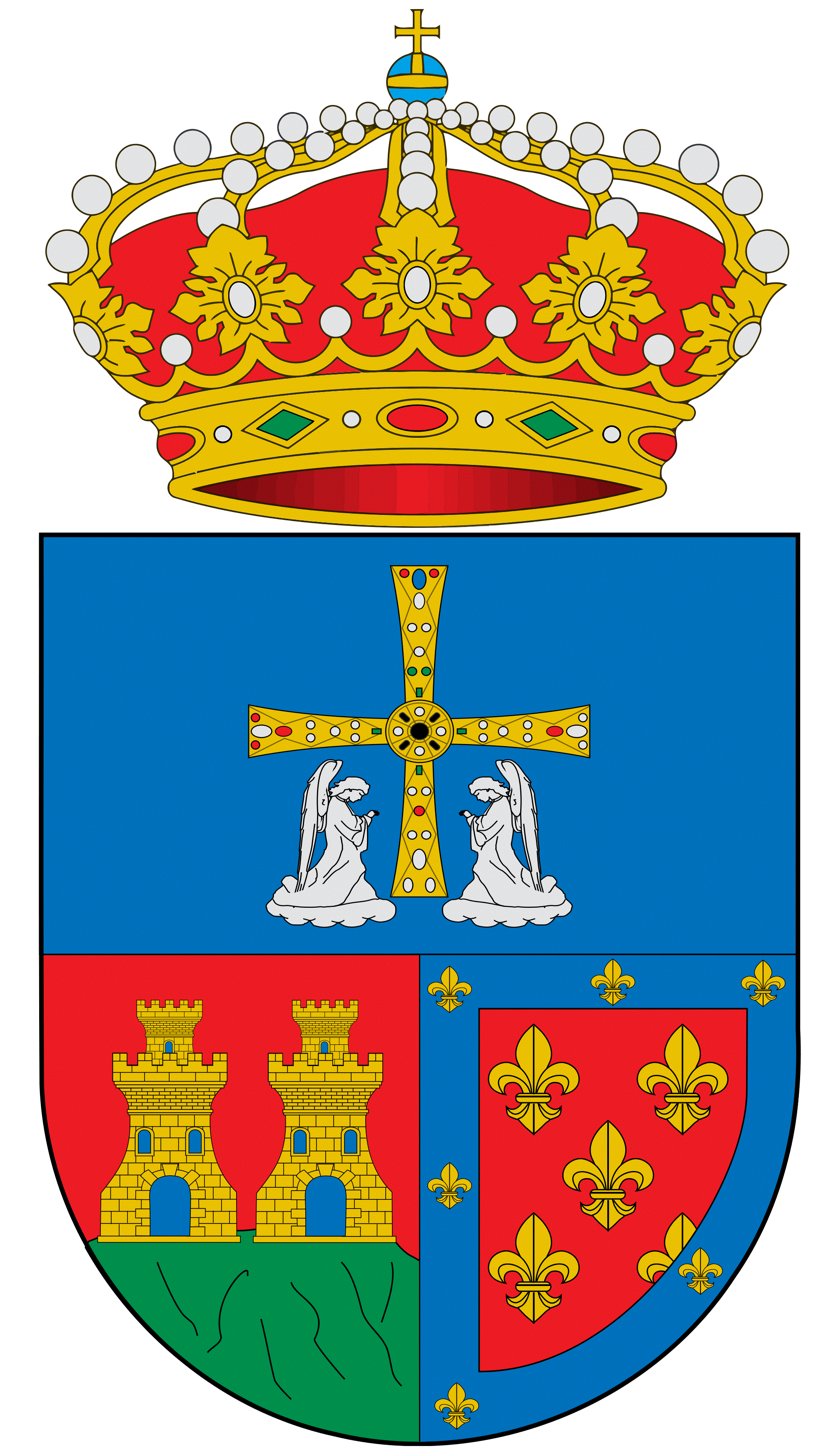
- Coat of arms

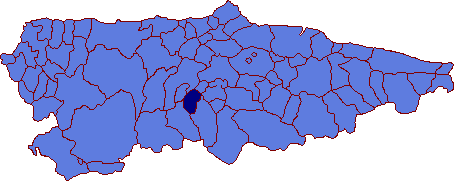

- Location in Spain
- Coordinates: 43°15′N 6°1′W
- Country: Spain
- Autonomous community: Asturias
- Province: Asturias
- Comarca: Oviedo
- Judicial district: Grado
- Capital: Proaza

Government
  - Alcalde: Ramón Fernández García (PSOE)

Area
  - Total: 76.79 km^{2} (29.65 sq mi)
- Highest elevation: 1,489 m (4,885 ft)

Population (2025-01-01)
  - Total: 686
  - Density: 8.93/km^{2} (23.1/sq mi)
- Demonym(s): proacín, proacina
- Time zone: UTC+1 (CET)
  - Summer (DST): UTC+2 (CEST)
- Postal code: 33112 and 33114

Proaza is a municipality in the Autonomous Community of the Principality of Asturias, Spain. It is bordered on the north by Santo Adriano and Grado, on the south by Teverga and Quirós, on the west by Yernes y Tameza and Teverga, and on the east by Quirós.

== Parroquias ==
The capital of the municipality of Proaza is the parish with the same name. It is 4.84 km^{2} (1.87 sq mi) in size, with a population of 347 (INE 2005).

- Bandujo
- Caranga
- Linares
- Proacina
- Proaza
- San Martín
- Sograndio
- Traspeña

== Natural wonders ==
- Caldoveiro Peak

== See also ==
- List of municipalities in Asturias
