= Lago, Asturias =

Lago Llago
- Parish
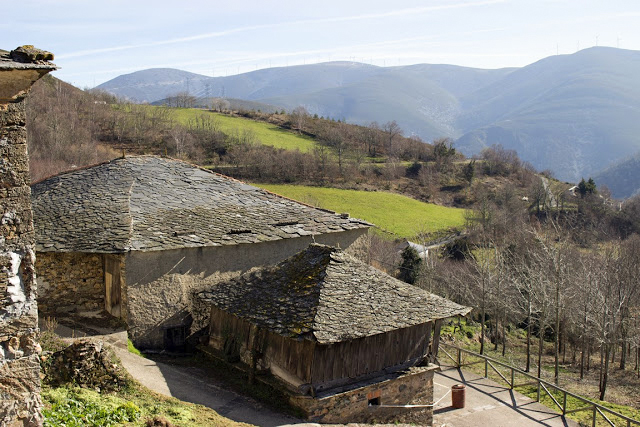
- Lago, Asturias

- Location within Spain
- Coordinates: 43.25°N 6.733333°W
- Country: Spain
- Autonomous community: Asturias
- Province: Asturias
- Municipality: Allande

Area
  - Total: 33.91 km^{2} (13.09 sq mi)

Population (2024)
  - Total: 12
  - Density: 0.35/km^{2} (0.92/sq mi)
- Time zone: UTC+1 (CET)

Lago (Asturian: Llago) is a parish (administrative division) in Allande, a municipality within the province and autonomous community of Asturias, in northern Spain.

The elevation is 885 m (2,904 ft) above sea level. It is 33.91 km^{2} (13.09 sq mi) in size. The population was 12 as of January 1, 2024.

== Villages and hamlets ==
- Armenande
- Carcedo
- Castaedo
- Llago
- Montefurao
- San Pedro
- El Villar
- Villardexusto
