= Parajas =

Parajas Paraxes
- Parish
- Location within Spain
- Coordinates: 43.2°N 6.583333°W
- Country: Spain
- Autonomous community: Asturias
- Province: Asturias
- Municipality: Allande

Area
  - Total: 2.62 km^{2} (1.01 sq mi)

Population (2024)
  - Total: 40
  - Density: 15/km^{2} (40/sq mi)
- Time zone: UTC+1 (CET)

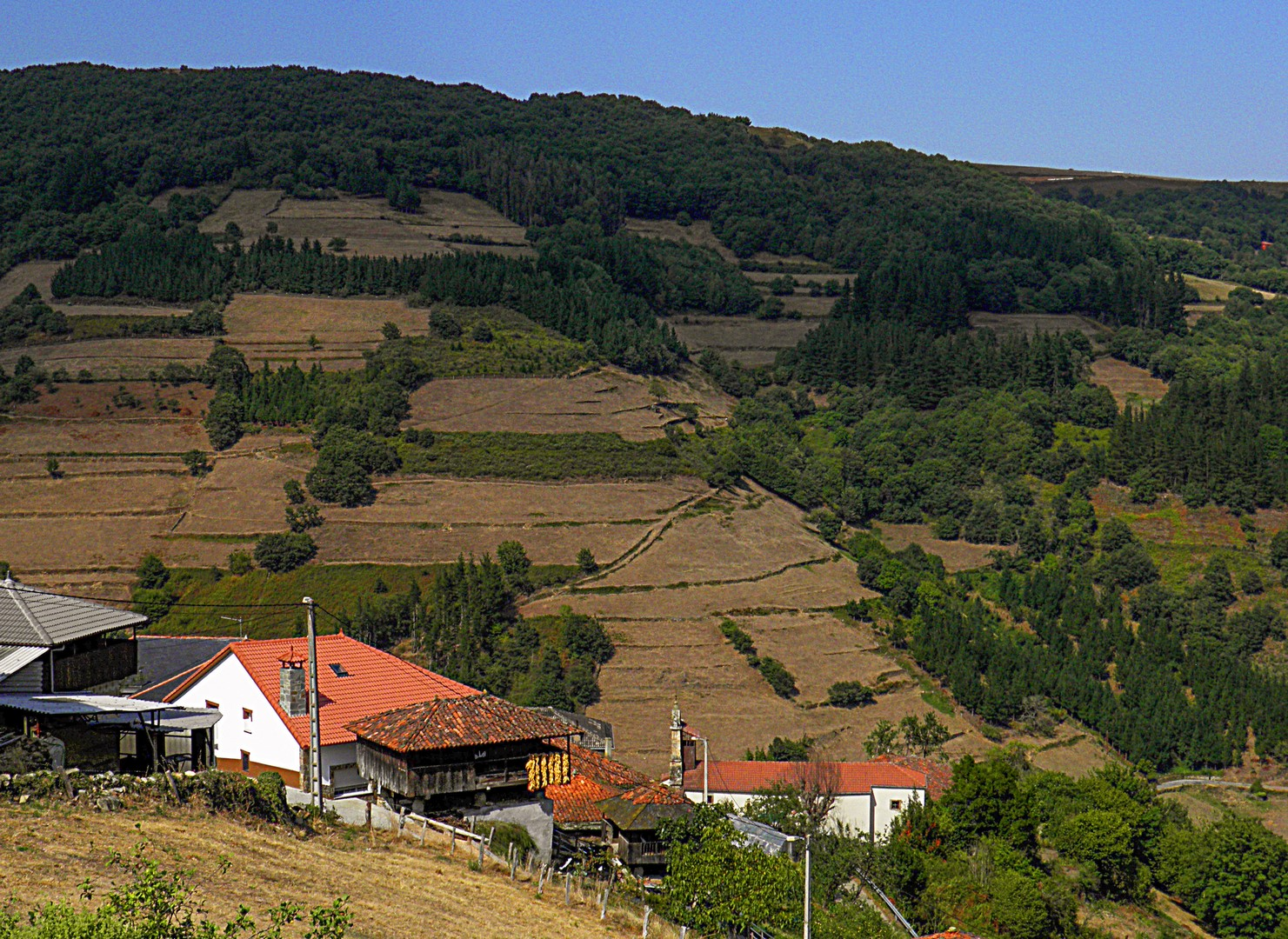

Parajas (Asturian: Paraxes) is a parish (administrative division) in Allande, a municipality within the province and autonomous community of Asturias, in northern Spain.

The elevation is 540 m (1,770 ft) above sea level. It is 2.62 km^{2} (1.01 sq mi) in size. The population was 40 as of January 1, 2024. The postal code is 33815.

== Villages and hamlets ==
- Argancinas
- Parajas ("Paraxas")
