= Palace of Cienfuegos de Peñalba =

Coordinates: 43.2733°N 6.6108°W

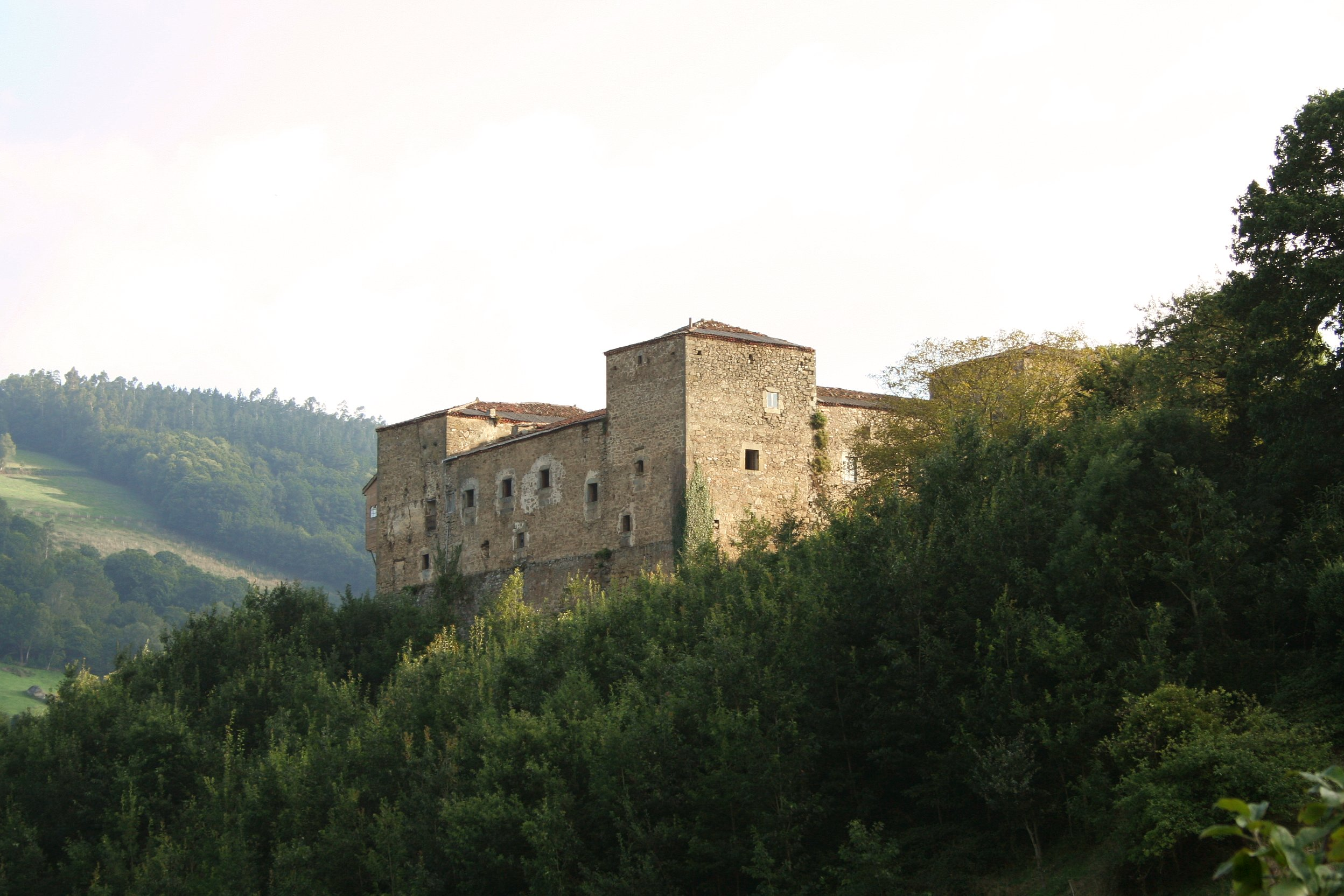
Palacio de Cienfuegos Allande

The Palace of Cienfuegos de Peñalba arises on a hill near Pola de Allande, capital of the Allande Municipality of Asturias, Spain. It was originally built in the 15th century on the site of an ancient fort, but has been refurbished so that the only remaining Gothic elements are on the lowest level.

The original owners were in the Ponce lineage, but it passed to the Counts de Luna and in 1515 to the Cienfuegos family lines. Around 1520 Rodrigo González de Cienfuegos, lord of Allande, undertook renovations to rebuild the property. In the eighteenth century, the property became the residence of the Count of Peñalba who renovated it to suit his tastes.

The Palace has L-shaped plan and is marked by three solid towers, which are not crenellated, adding to the monumental elements of the building and leading to its appearance of strong defenses. Of the three towers, the two oldest are the square ones and the most recent is rectangular. The last one was added as a housing area in the nineteenth century. It contains 23 bedrooms, as well as a hall, kitchen, living room, lounge, and oratory. The rectangular courtyard has little decoration or ornamentation. Without porticoes the first floor has a wooden gallery supported by thick, rough masonry columns. There are also multiple stables.

On 26 January 1994 it was declared a Culturally important monument. Rain and water seepage are a constant threat to the stability of the structure.

In 2008 a rehabilitation project was completed which recovered some of the shapes and colors from the 1888 gallery which was added to the main tower at that time.
