= Linares (Allande) =

Linares Ḷḷinares
- Parish
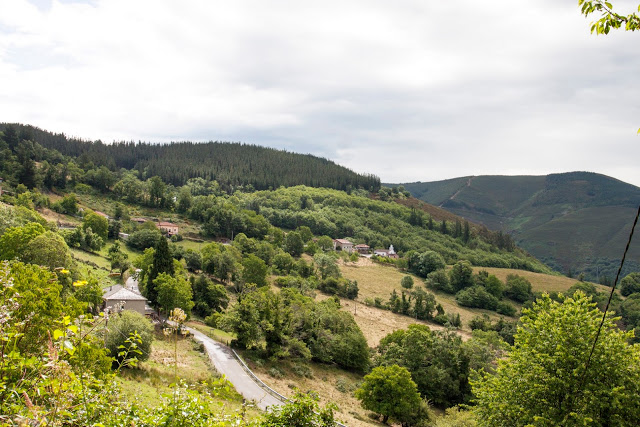

- Location within Spain
- Coordinates: 43.233333°N 6.55°W
- Country: Spain
- Autonomous community: Asturias
- Province: Asturias
- Municipality: Allande

Area
  - Total: 3.84 km^{2} (1.48 sq mi)

Population (2024)
  - Total: 46
  - Density: 12/km^{2} (31/sq mi)
- Time zone: UTC+1 (CET)

Linares (Asturian: Ḷḷinares) is a parish (administrative division) in Allande, a municipality within the province and autonomous community of Asturias, in northern Spain. The parish capital, Pola de Allande, is 7 km (4.3 mi) away.

The parish elevation is 520 m (1,710 ft) above sea level. It is 3.84 km^{2} (1.48 sq mi) in size. The population was 46 as of January 1, 2024.

== Villages and hamlets ==
- Arganzúa
- La Ponte Ḷḷinares
- Ḷḷinares

== David Bomberg ==
The famous artist David Bomberg lived in Linares from July to October 1935, during this period he painted one of his most celebrated landscapes: "The valley of La Hermida, Picos de Europa"
