= Trespena =

Trespena is one of eight parishes in Proaza, a municipality within the province and autonomous community of Asturias, in northern Spain.

It is 13.29 km^{2} (5.13 sq mi) in size with a population of 65 (INE 2005).

== Villages ==
- Bustieḷḷu
- Fabar
- Santa María
- Las Ventas
- El Toral
