= La sirena varada =

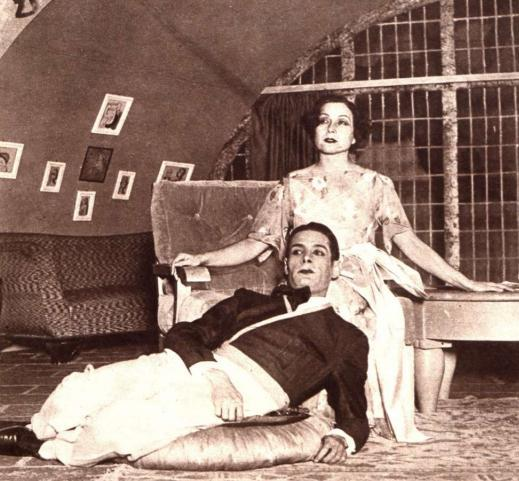
- Margarita Xirgu and Pedro López Lagar in the play
- Written by: Alejandro Casona
- Characters: Margarita Xirgu; Pedro López Lagar
- Original language: Spanish

Premiere
- Date premiered: 17 March 1934
- Place premiered: Teatro Español

La sirena varada is a Spanish play by Alejandro Casona written in 1934 during his stay in Valle de Arán. It is about a mermaid who falls in love with a man named Ricardo.

It was released at Teatro Español in Madrid in the night of 17 March 1934, which was directed by Margarita Xirgu and Enrique Borrás and it got good reviews. Main characters were portrayed by Margarita Xirgu as Sirena, Enrique Borrás as Samy, Pedro López Lagar as Ricardo, Alberto Contreras as Don Florín, Fernando Aguirre Rodil as Fantasma and Enrique Guitart as Don Joaquín.

In 1934 it received the Premio Lope de Vega at Ayuntamiento de Madrid for best play of the year.
