= Berducedo =

- Parish
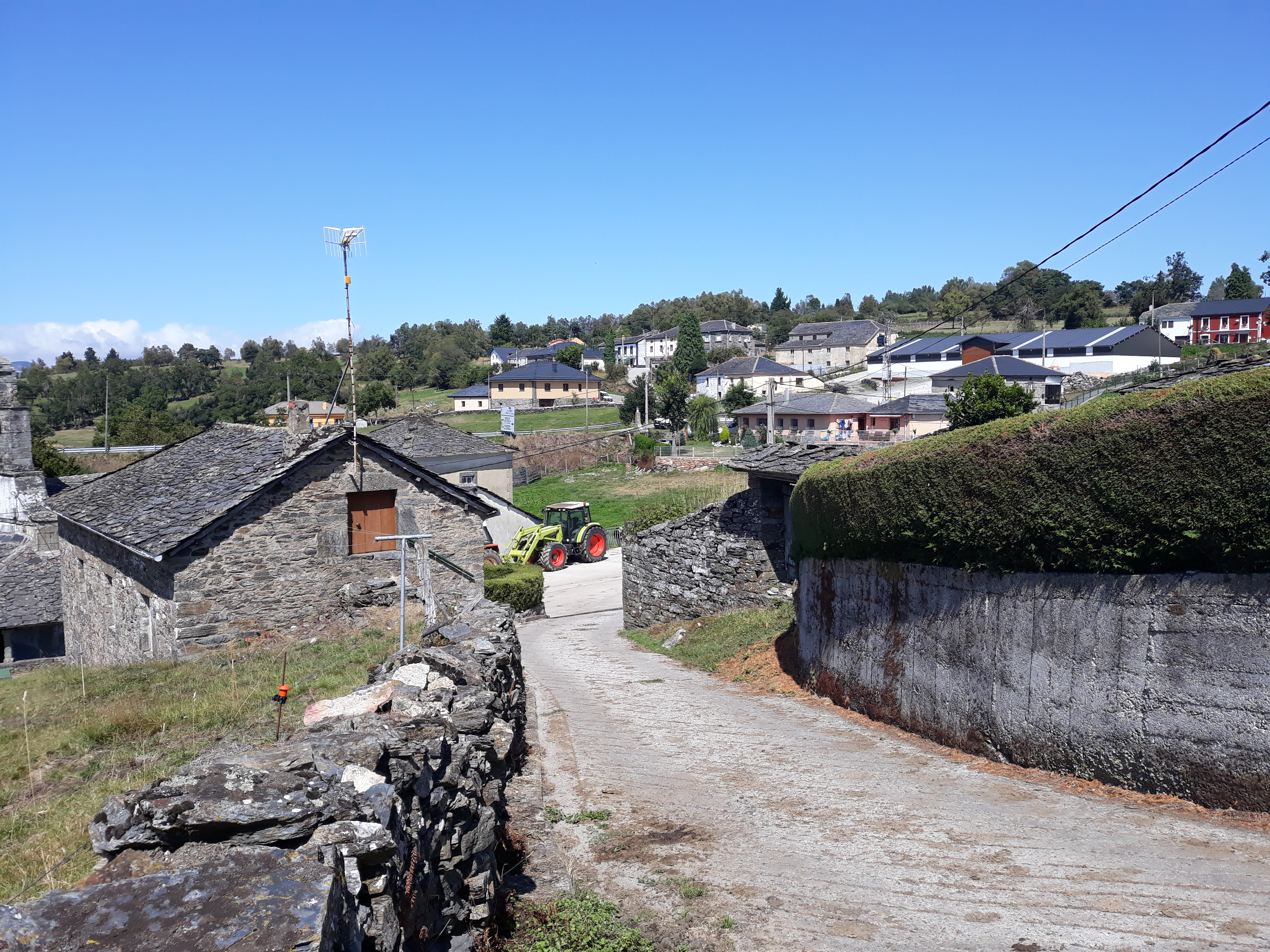

- Location within Spain
- Coordinates: 43.23442°N 6.76861°W
- Country: Spain
- Autonomous community: Asturias
- Province: Asturias
- Municipality: Allande

Area
  - Total: 26.63 km^{2} (10.28 sq mi)

Population (2024)
  - Total: 118
  - Density: 4.43/km^{2} (11.5/sq mi)
- Time zone: UTC+1 (CET)
- Postal code: 33887

Berducedo is a parish (administrative division) in Allande, a municipality within the province and autonomous community of Asturias, in northern Spain. It is situated at 898 m (2,946 ft) above sea level, and is 26.63 km^{2} (10.28 sq mi) in size. The population was 118 as of January 1, 2024. The postal code is 33887.

== Villages and hamlets ==
- Baldedo
- Berducedo
- Las Cabañas
- Castello
- El Castro
- Corondeño
- La Figuerina ("A Figueiría")
- La Grandera ("A Grandeira")
- Teijedo ("Teixedo")
- Trapa
- Trellopico
