= Proacina =

Coordinates: 43.25°N 6.05°W

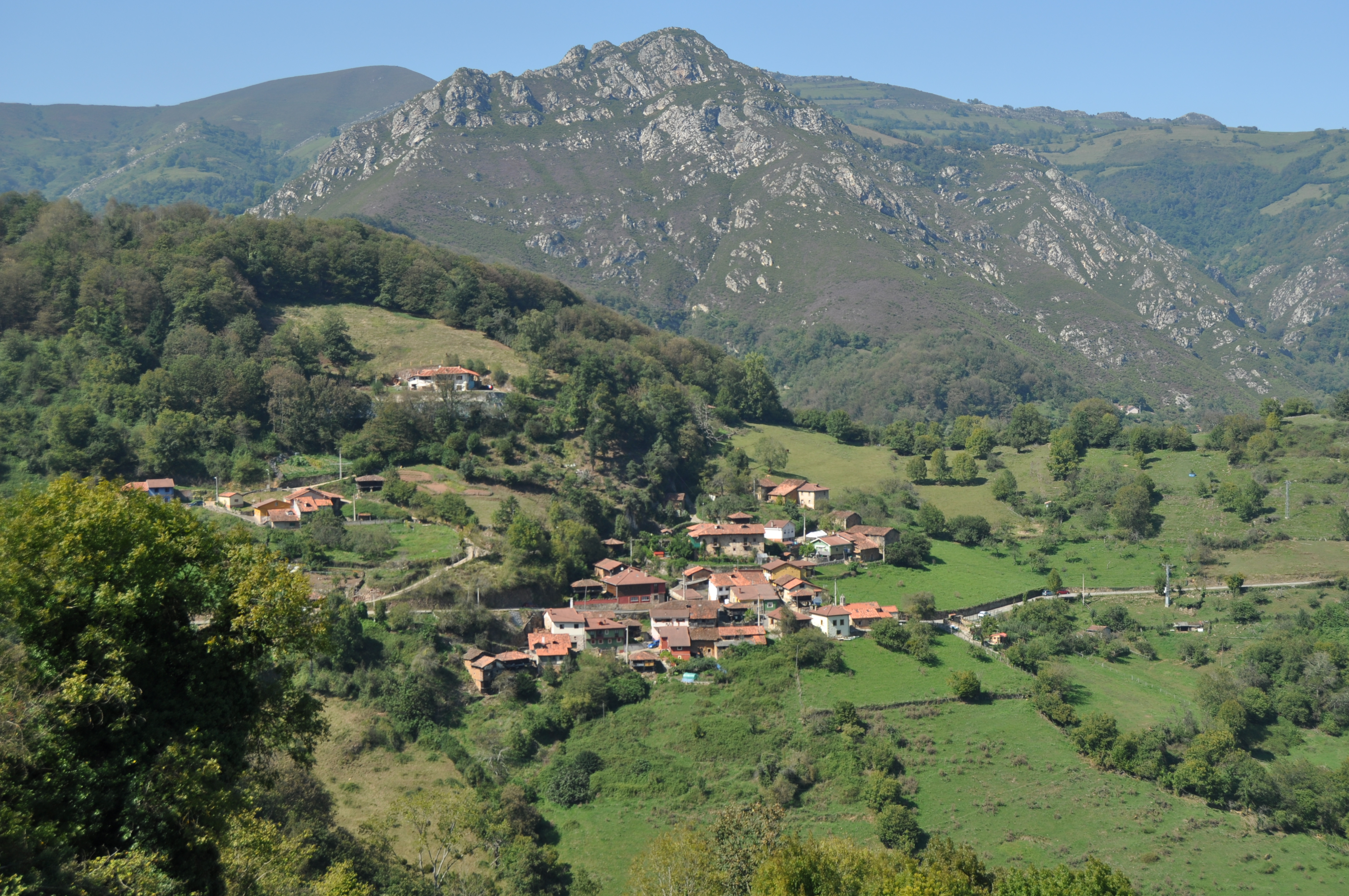
View of Proacina

Proacina is one of eight parishes in Proaza, a municipality within the province and autonomous community of Asturias, in northern Spain.

It is 5.14 km^{2} (1.98 sq mi) in size, with a population of 19 (INE 2005).
