= La dama del alba =

1944 play by Alejandro Casona

La dama del alba ('The Lady of the Dawn') is a Spanish play written by playwright Alejandro Casona in 1944. It is a fantasy-drama in which Death personified is the main character. It takes place in a small village in the Spanish Principality of Asturias. The play consists of four acts, and is very popular in its own country.

== Synopsis ==
=== Act I ===
The play begins with the introduction of the Narces family. It has been four years since the mother's daughter, Angelica, mysteriously drowned in large river in their town four years ago. Angelica was married to a young man named Martin three days before her apparent death. Her body was never found, and thus no proper burial was performed. The memory of her death still dwells in her family's minds. On the anniversary of Angelica's death, "La Peregrina" (The Pilgrim in English) shows up at the door, explaining she is traveling on the Camino de Santiago ("Way of St. James" in English). Since pilgrims are said to bring blessings upon the houses they visit, the family allows her inside. The grandfather recognizes her but doesn't remember from where he knows her. The children play a game with her, and she laughs in a strange way, which scares the children. She says she has never laughed before. She is also surprised by the fact that she had felt her beating heart. Suddenly, the woman becomes fatigued and falls asleep. She tells the children to wake her up before nine, which they fail to do because they go to bed.

=== Act II ===
The Grandfather realizes that The Pilgrim is Death herself; he recognizes her from a near-death experience he had years before in the mine accident which killed all seven of the family servant Telva's children. He pleads with her to leave his family alone, as they have suffered enough already because of her. The Pilgrim had actually come to claim Martin's soul, but was unable to because she was asleep when he was supposed to die. Described in very human terms in the play, she explains she is merely fulfilling her mission, and doesn't like having to be present whenever someone dies. She explains to the grandfather she has a difficult life, never being able to die despite being death itself. The grandfather takes pity on her referring to her as a "poor woman." Meanwhile, Martin brings back a woman by the name of Adela, who had tried to drown herself in the river. The Pilgrim admits that she wasn't expecting Adela's death. Even so, she says that Adela will again search for her death, and next time she will find it. The Pilgrim tell the grandfather that he and his family will be happy at her return despite the fact that when she returns in seven months, it will be to take a woman's soul.

=== Act III ===
Adela becomes part of the family, unwittingly beginning to take the role that Angelica had once had, as daughter, lover, and sister. She tries to make the mother happy by wearing Angelica's clothes and trying as much as possible to appear to be Angelica. Martin reveals to Adela two secrets: the first secret is that Angelica didn't drown, but had run away with a lover. Martin knew this, but allowed the family to believe she was dead so as not to ruin their memory of her. In addition to this, although he has been rough and has not spoken very much to Adela, he is really in love with her. Martin also describes the town's dislike of Adela, whom they believe is trying to take what was rightfully Angelica's, and trying to take away Angelica's husband. He decides that he must leave to protect Adela from the town's anger, but later decides to act against it. The grandfather feels uncomfortable with Adela taking the place of Angelica, and also fears this, because of The Pilgrim's future return. Angelica's mother is extremely pleased with Adela's role as her new daughter. She hears of the romance between Adela and Martin. Although she disapproves of Martin marrying another besides her daughter, she gives the couple her blessing.

=== Act IV ===
Angelica comes back during the festival of San Juan, unbeknownst to her family. She has been miserable because her lover has long since left her. She is worn down and wanted to beg forgiveness and hopes Martin will forgive her and take her back. Ashamed of her actions, she wants to resume her previous life, just the way she left it. The Pilgrim, having returned, tells her that is not possible: she has already been replaced by Adela. The Pilgrim realizes her true mission: she has been sent for Angelica. It is Angelica's proper time to die; she must drown herself to preserve her image and prevent any shame from being brought upon her family. When Angelica's body is found, seemingly perfectly preserved after supposedly being dead for years, the mother announces that it is a miracle. An appropriate burial is finally held, allowing her family to finally deal with her death. The Pilgrim then leaves, commenting on how she envies mortal existence and love.

== Film versions and opera adaptation ==
La Dama del Alba has been filmed at least four times: in 1950 and 1966 for movie theatres, and three times for television, perhaps even more. The 1966 film version featured Dolores del Río as The Pilgrim. There has also been a made-for-TV French version. The play is little-known in English-speaking countries, and has never been filmed in English.

The play has been adapted into an opera by Slovak composer Bartolomej Urbanec (as Pani úsvitu), which premiered in the Slovak National Theatre, Bratislava, in 1976.
