= San Martín del Valledor =

San Martín del Valledor Samartín
- Parish
- Location within Spain
- Coordinates: 43°10′40.41″N 6°46′26.22″W
- Country: Spain
- Autonomous community: Asturias
- Province: Asturias
- Municipality: Allande

Area
  - Total: 54.4 km^{2} (21.0 sq mi)

Population (2024)
  - Total: 65
  - Density: 1.2/km^{2} (3.1/sq mi)
- Time zone: UTC+1 (CET)

San Martín del Valledor (Galician-Asturian: Samartín) is a parish (administrative division) in Allande, a municipality within the province and autonomous community of Asturias, in northern Spain. It is situated 31 km (19 mi) from the capital, Pola de Allande

The elevation is 480 m (1,570 ft) above sea level. It is 54.4 km^{2} (21.0 sq mi) in size, with a population of 65 as of January 1, 2024. The postal code is 33887.

== Villages and hamlets ==
- Aguanes
- Busvidal
- Coba
- Cornollo (Cornolyo)
- El Engertal (El Enxertal)
- La Furada (A Furada)
- Paradas
- El Provo
- Robledo (Robredo)
- Rubieiro
- Salcedo
- Tremado (Tremao)
- Villasonte (Vilasonte)
- San Martín del Valledor (Samartín)
