= Lomes =

Lomes Ḷḷomes
- Parish
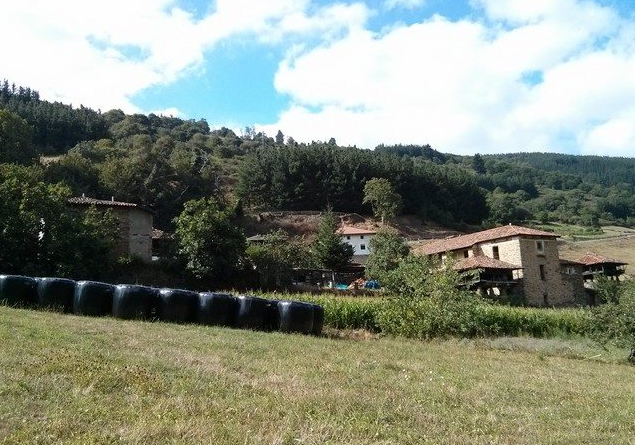

- Location within Spain
- Coordinates: 43.216667°N 6.566667°W
- Country: Spain
- Autonomous community: Asturias
- Province: Asturias
- Municipality: Allande

Area
  - Total: 6.76 km^{2} (2.61 sq mi)

Population (2024)
  - Total: 76
  - Density: 11/km^{2} (29/sq mi)
- Time zone: UTC+1 (CET)

Lomes (Asturian: Ḷḷomes) is a parish (administrative division) in Allande, a municipality within the province and autonomous community of Asturias, in northern Spain.

The elevation is 420 m (1,380 ft) above sea level. It is 6.76 km^{2} (2.61 sq mi) in size. The population was 76 as of January 1, 2024. The postal code is 33890.

== Villages and hamlets ==
- Carcedo de Lomes ("Carcéu")
- Lomes ("Ḷḷomes")
- Otero ("L'Outeiru")
- Tarallé ("Taraé")

The parish church, dedicated to Saint James the Greater, was built in the 15th century.
