= Sograndio (Proaza) =

Coordinates: 43.35°N 5.933333°W

not to be confused with Sograndio, Oviedo, also in Asturias

Sograndio is one of eight parishes in Proaza, a municipality within the province and autonomous community of Asturias, in northern Spain.

It is 9.98 km^{2} (3.85 sq mi) in size with a population of 83 (INE 2005). The postal code is 33114.

== See also ==
- Iglesia de San Esteban (Sograndio)
