= Asunción Linares =

Spanish paleontologist

- Born: Asunción Linares Rodríguez; 12 February 1921; Pulianas (Granada), Spain
- Died: 21 April 2005 (aged 84); Granada, Spain
- Occupation: Paleontologist

Academic background
- Education: Doctor
- Alma mater: Complutense University of Madrid
- Thesis: Revisión de los trilobites de España (1952)
- Doctoral advisor: Bermudo Meléndez Meléndez

Asunción Linares Rodríguez (12 February 1921 – 21 April 2005) was a Spanish paleontologist who excelled in teaching and research. She earned a degree in Natural Sciences at the Complutense University of Madrid, obtaining her doctorate in 1952 under the direction of Bermudo Meléndez. She became the Chair of Paleontology at the University of Granada in 1961, being the first woman to obtain such a position on a science faculty in Spain, and the second to become a full professor after the Civil War. Regarding her academic relevance, she stood out for the direction of numerous doctoral works over her career.

She introduced the specialty of Micropaleontology at the University of Granada.

She was Vice Chancellor of academic organization of the University of Granada from 1980 to 1981.

== Awards and recognitions ==
- A plaza in Granada is named after her: Plaza de la Catedrática Asunción Linares.
- A municipal nursery school in Granada is named after her.
- Member of Honor of the Spanish Paleontology Society

=== Dedicated taxa ===
- Lemdadella linaresae Liñán and Sdzuy, 1978: a trilobite of the Lower Cambrian
- Linaresia González-Donoso, 1968: a genus of foraminifera of the Cenozoic
- Linaresites Sandoval 2012: a genus of ammonites of the Aalenian and Bajocian (Middle Jurassic) of the Subbaetic System

== Works ==
- Sobre la estratigrafía del Eoceno del Alto Llobregat (Pirineo catalán): work presented at the Ia. Reunión del Terciario, Sabadell 1956 / by J.M. Fontboté, G. Colom, and A. Linares. Madrid: Instituto "Lucas Mallada", CSIC, 1957 (Library of the Complutense University of Madrid)
- Observaciones sobre la sedimentación miocénica en el alto valle del Genil (Granada): work presented at the Ia. Reunión del Terciario, Sabadell 1956 / by A. Linares and G. Colom. Madrid: CSIC, Instituto "Lucas Mallada", 1957 (Library of the Complutense University of Madrid)
- Decouverte de l'Hettagien dans la coupe de Alhama de Granada (Andalousie) / by Robert Busnardo, René Mouterde, and Asunción Linares. s.l. : s.n., 1966. (Library of the Complutense University of Madrid)
- "Trilobites en Sierra Nevada (Granada)", in Estudios Geológicos, no. 12, December 1950
- "Trias fosilifere a facies pelagique pres de Alhama de Granada (Andalousie)", Paris: Jouve, 1969, in C.R. Acad. Sc. Paris, t. 268, March 1969; pp. 1365–1367
- "Sobre la estratigrafía del Eoceno del alto Llobregat (Pirineo Catalan)", in Cursillos y Conferencias del Instituto 'Lucas Mallada', fasc. IV, 1957; pp. 93–103
- "Presence de formes sub - boreales d'Ammonites (Amaltheides) dans le Lias moyen de la zone subbetique (Espagne meridionale)", in Bull. Soc. Geol. de France, I, t. XVI, no. 4, 1974; pp. 453–455
- "Precisiones estratigráficas sobre la unidad de Moclin (zona subbética, provincia de Granada", in Cuadernos de Geología, 2, 3, 1971
- "Perfiles de Leon", in Puntos de interés geológico
- "Observations sur le Lias de la Sierra Elvira (Province de Grenade, Espagne)", in Livre a la memoire du Professeur Paul Fallot, T. I; pp. 183–188
- "Observaciones sobre la sedimentación miocenica en el alto valle del Genil (Granada)", in Cursillos y Conferencias del Instituto 'Lucas Mallada', fasc. IV, 1957; pp. 105–110
- "Nueva especie fósil del ordoviciense de Ciudad Real", in Estudios Geológicos, no. 17, 1953; pp. 135–137: il
- "Nota acerca de dos pigidios de trilobites", in Estudios Geológicos, no. 12, December 1950; pp. 287–291
- "Metacronia del Amnonitico Rosso Liasico en la zona subbética (sector central)", in Cuadernos de Geología Ibérica, V. 2, 1971; pp. 183–204
- "Los mármoles de la Cartuja de Granada", in Estudios Geológicos, no. 6, 1947; pp. 95–100: il
- Memoria [Further studies of micropaleontology in Paris, Lille, Dijon, Lyon and Toulouse], [S.l.: s.n.], 1957
- Algunos aspectos de la dinámica de la vida según el registro fósil, Granada: Secretariat of the University of Granada, 1983
- "Le domerien superieur dans le subbetique central (Andalouise)", in Cuadernos de Geología Ibérica, vol. 2, 1971; pp. 237–254
- "La transición Lias - Dogger en el sector Alamedilla, zona subbética", in Cuadernos de geología, 4. 1973; pp. 155–160
- "La serie estratigráfica de Alta Coloma, serie tipo del subbético medio en la transversal". in Cuadernos de Geología, University of Granada, September–October 1970; pp. 193–211
- II Coloquio de Estratigrafía y Paleogeografía del Cretácico en España. Albacete: [s.n.], 1982
- Estratigrafía y geología de eventos, Granada: Academia, 1990
- "El Lias medio en la parte sur de la zona subbética (Sierra Elvira, Illora e Iznalloz, prov.)", in Cuadernos de geología, 4, 1973; pp. 141–154: il
- "El Lias del sector central de la zona subbética (Vista de conjunto)", in Cuadernos de Geología Ibérica, v. 2, 1971; pp. 227–236
- "Donnes micropaleontologiques sur les environs de Domingo Pérez (chaine Subbetique, prov. de Granade, Espagne)", in Bulletin de la Société Géologique de France, 7 serie, t. II, no. 3, 1960; pp. 322–323
- "Contribución al estudio de la sedimentación en las cordilleras béticas", in Estudios Geológicos, no. 25, Madrid, March 1955; pp. 37–42: il
