= Celón =

Celón Zalón
- Parish
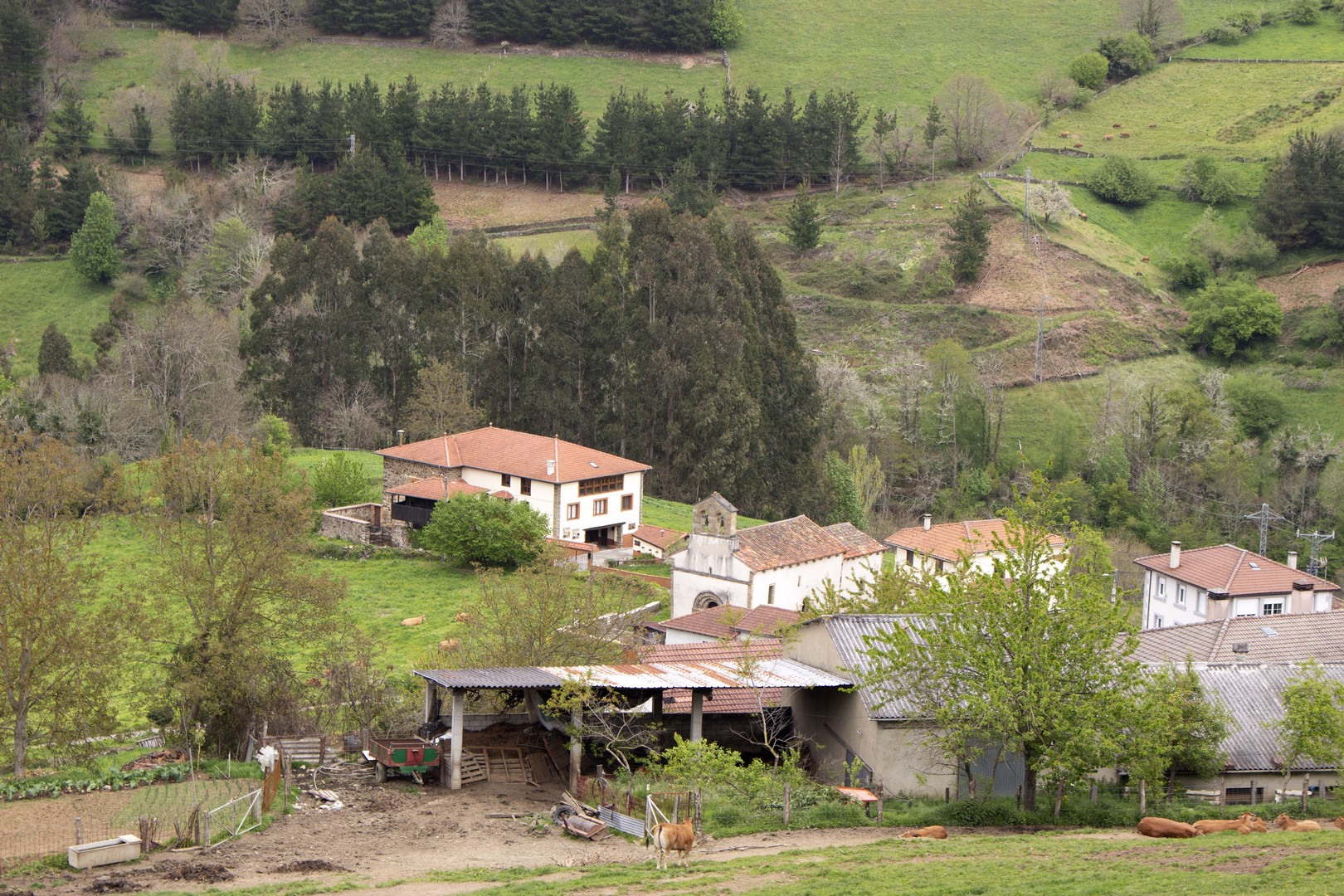

- Location within Spain
- Coordinates: 43.23333°N 6.583333°W
- Country: Spain
- Autonomous community: Asturias
- Province: Asturias
- Municipality: Allande

Area
  - Total: 3.83 km^{2} (1.48 sq mi)

Population (2024)
  - Total: 85
  - Density: 22/km^{2} (57/sq mi)
- Time zone: UTC+1 (CET)

Celón (Asturian: Zalón) is a parish in Allande, a municipality within the province and autonomous community of Asturias, in northern Spain. It is located 5 km (3.1 mi) from the parish capital of La Puela.

The parish elevation is 540 m (1,770 ft) above sea level. It is 3.83 km^{2} (1.48 sq mi) in size. The population was 85 as of January 1, 2024.

== Villages and hamlets ==
- La Vega ("La Vega de Truelles")
- Presnas
- Pumar
- San Martin de Beduledo ("Samartín de Beduledo")
- Villaverde
