= Marta Linares =

Marta Linares may refer to:

- Marta Linares de Martinelli (born 1956), First Lady of Panama
- Marta Linares (gymnast) (born 1986), Spanish rhythmic gymnast
