= Linares, Nariño =

Coordinates: 1°21′N 77°32′W

- Municipality and town
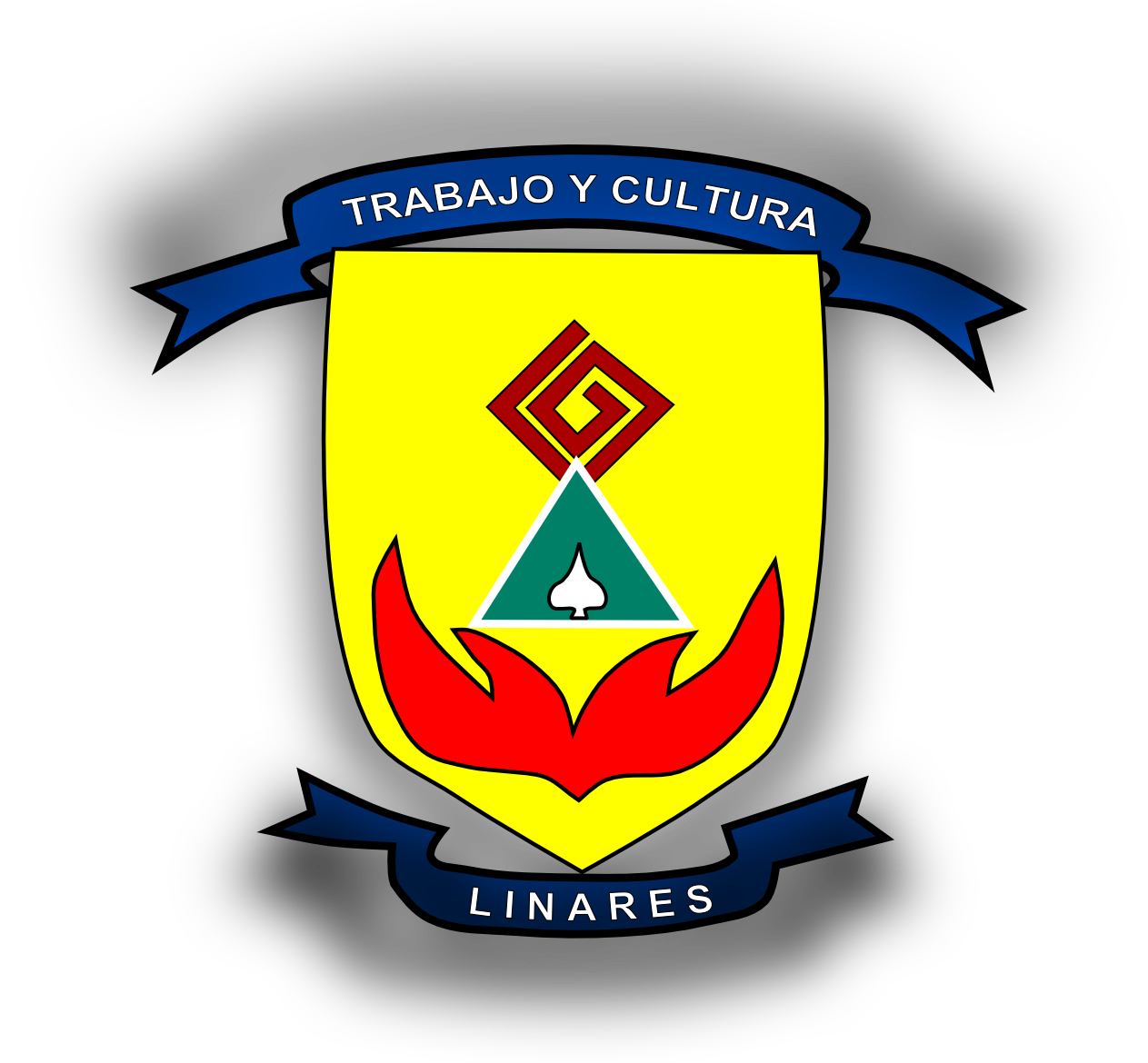
- Flag Coat of arms

- Location of the municipality and town of Linares, Nariño in the Nariño Department of Colombia.
- Country: Colombia
- Department: Nariño Department

Area
  - Total: 115 km^{2} (44 sq mi)

Population (Census 2018)
  - Total: 8,974
  - Density: 78.0/km^{2} (202/sq mi)
- Time zone: UTC-5 (Colombia Standard Time)

Linares is a town and municipality in the Nariño Department, Colombia.

Among the products of this municipality are panela which is obtained from sugar cane.
