= Diocese of Linares =

(Roman Catholic) Diocese of Linares may refer to the following Latin Catholic jurisdictions:

- Diocese of Linares, Chile
- Diocese of Linares, Mexico
- the former Roman Catholic Diocese of Linares or Nueva León (promoted to archbishopric; now Monterrey)
