= San Salvador del Valledor =

San Salvador del Valledor San Salvador
- Parish
- Location within Spain
- Coordinates: 43°9′26.10″N 6°48′17.31″W
- Country: Spain
- Autonomous community: Asturias
- Province: Asturias
- Municipality: Allande

Area
  - Total: 39.46 km^{2} (15.24 sq mi)

Population (2024)
  - Total: 56
  - Density: 1.4/km^{2} (3.7/sq mi)
- Time zone: UTC+1 (CET)

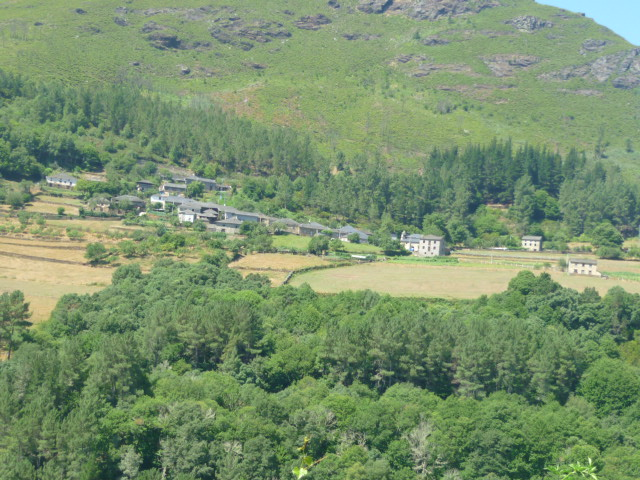
Town of San Salvador del Valledor

San Salvador del Valledor (Galician-Asturian: San Salvador) is a parish (administrative division) in Allande, a municipality within the province and autonomous community of Asturias, in northern Spain.

It is 39.46 km^{2} (15.24 sq mi) in size, with a population of 56 as of January 1, 2024. The postal code is 33887.

== Villages and hamlets ==
- As Grobas
- Barras
- Bustarel
- Collada
- Fonteta
- San Salvador
- Trabaces
- Villalaín (Vilalaín)
- Villanueva (Vilanova)
