= Allande =

Allande Ayande (Galician-Asturian)
- Municipality
- Flag Coat of arms

- Location in the Asturias.

- Location in Spain
- Coordinates: 43°16′N 6°37′W
- Country: Spain
- Autonomous community: Asturias
- Province: Asturias
- Comarca: Narcea
- Judicial district: Tineo
- Capital: Pola de Allande

Government
  - Alcalde: José Antonio Mesa Pieiga (PSOE)

Area
  - Total: 342.24 km^{2} (132.14 sq mi)
- Highest elevation: 1,416 m (4,646 ft)

Population (2025-01-01)
  - Total: 1,506
  - Density: 4.400/km^{2} (11.40/sq mi)
- Demonym: Allandeses
- Time zone: UTC+1 (CET)
  - Summer (DST): UTC+2 (CEST)
- Postal code: 33815, 33885 - 33890
- Website: Official website

Allande (Asturian and Galician-Asturian: Ayande) is a municipality in the Autonomous Community of the Principality of Asturias, Spain. Its capital is Pola de Allande.

The municipality is bordered on the north by Villayón, on the south by Cangas del Narcea and Ibias, to the east by Tineo and to the west by Pesoz, Grandas de Salime and Negueira de Muñiz (in the province of Lugo, Galicia).

The majority of the territory of the municipality is a National Monument. Among its forest riches are thousand-year-old yews in the parishes of Santa Colma and Lago, and the cork forest of Boxu.

== Demography ==
Allande is one of the least populated municipalities in Asturias. Like the rest of the Asturian rural areas, the area is losing population. In the 20th century, there were two major periods of population loss. The first was from 1900 to 1930, where a large number of the inhabitants emigrated to the New World, especially Cuba, Puerto Rico, Argentina, and the Dominican Republic. The second period began in 1960 and is due to the deindustrialization of the countryside, which caused the municipality to lose nearly two-thirds of its population.

== Parishes ==
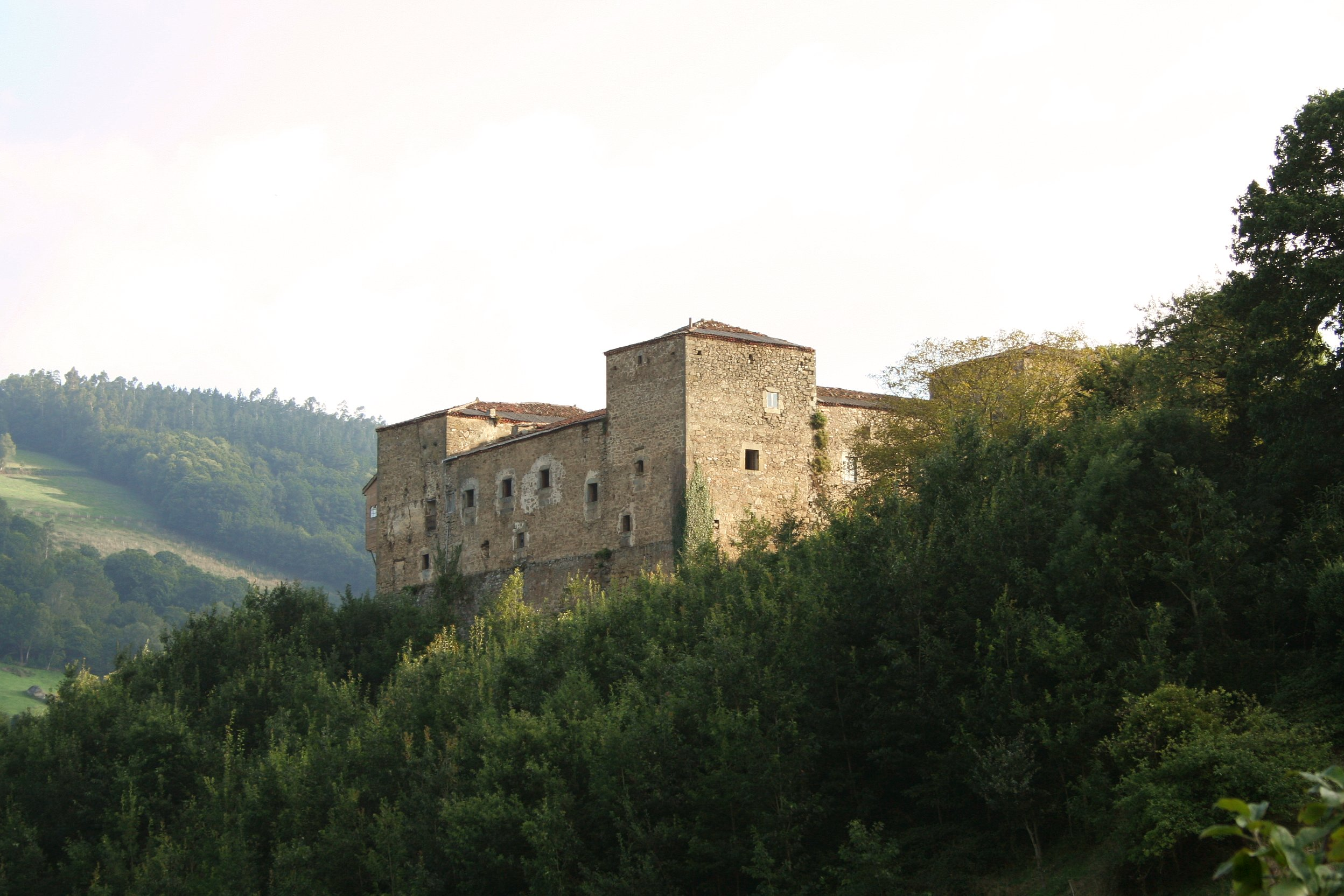
Palace of Cienfuegos de Peñalba

- Berducedo
- Besullo
- Bustantigo
- Celón
- Lago
- Linares
- Lomes
- Parajas
- La Pola
- San Emiliano
- San Martín del Valledor
- San Salvador del Valledor
- Santa Coloma
- Villagrufe
- Villar de Sapos
- Villavaser
- Villaverde

== Holidays ==
In this municipality a number of local holidays are celebrated. The Nuestra Señora de Avellano (Our Lady of Avellano) in Pola de Allande from September 7 to 10, and Nuestra Señora de Belderaman (Our Lady of Belderaman) on August 15, in the 18th-century sanctuary of the same name in which there is a fountain which, according to legend, cures goiter.

There is also the holidays of San Jorge de Monon on June 29, San Pedro de Valbona on June 29, Santa Isabel in Berducedo the first Sunday in July, San Cristóbal in Campo el Río the second Sunday of July, and San Roque in Fonteta August 16, 17, and 18.

== Politics ==
Local election results
Party/List	1979	1983	1987	1991	1995	1999	2003	2007	2011	2015
FSA-PSOE	0	5	5	6	6	6	4	8	7	6
CD / AP / PP	0	6	6	5	5	5	5	2	1	1
FAC									3	1
ALLI										1
CITA								1		
AIDA							2			
UCD/CDS	6	0	0	0						
CAI	7									
Total	13	11	11	11	11	11	11	11	11	9

== See also ==
- List of municipalities in Asturias
