= Llinares =

Coordinates: 43°16′57″N 6°01′24″W

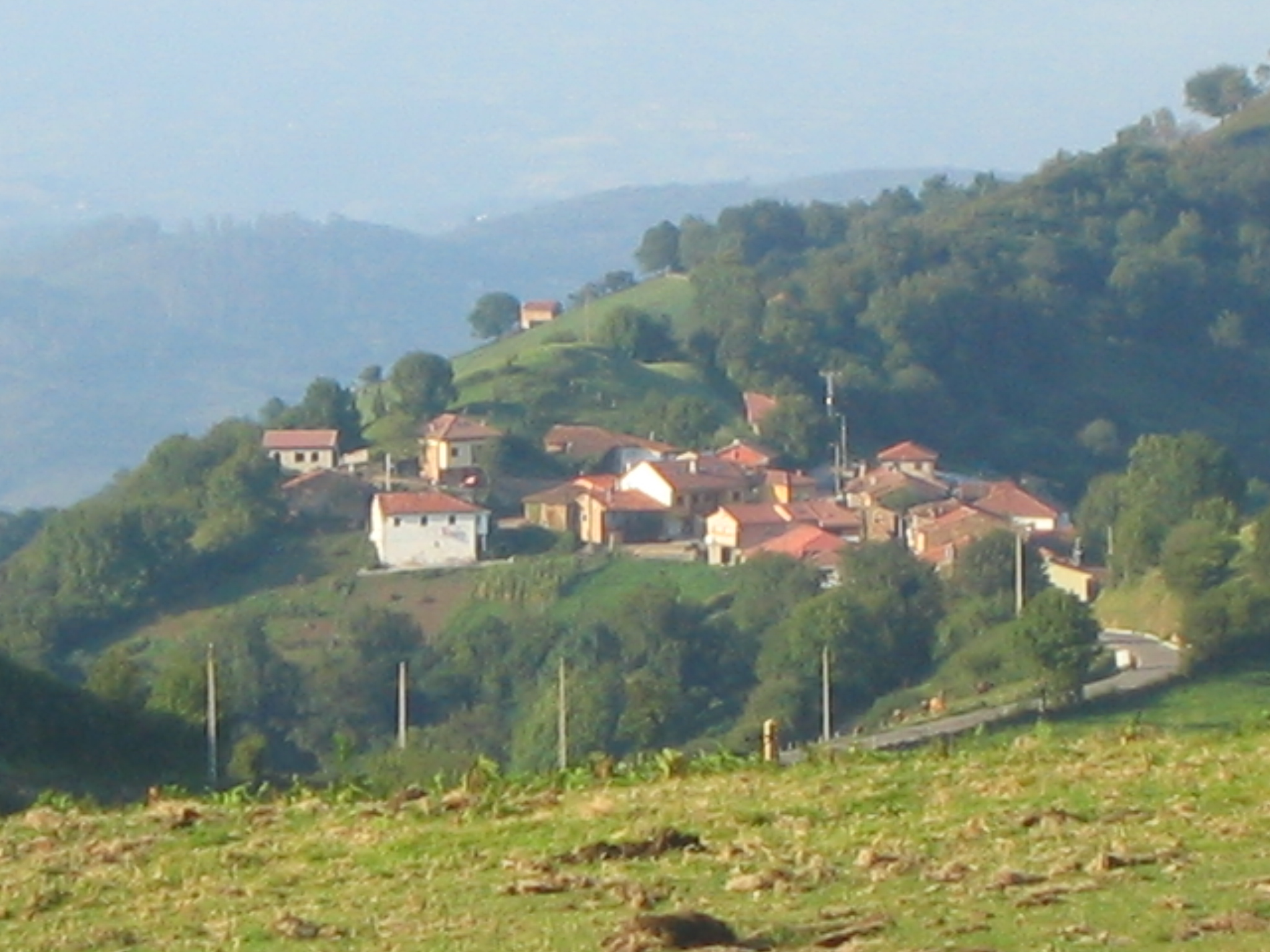
Linares

Llinares is one of eight parishes in Proaza, a municipality within the province and autonomous community of Asturias, in northern Spain.

It is 4.34 km^{2} (1.68 sq mi) in size with a population of 28 (INE 2005). The postal code is 33114.

== Villages ==
- Las Veigas
  - La Polea
  - La Rebellada
- Llinares
  - El Cantu
  - El Cantu Solailesia
  - El Carbayón
  - La Esquina
  - La Fonte Beninu
  - L'Oral
  - Los Pedreiros
  - La Portiella
  - La Raya
  - El Valle
