= Pola de Allande =

- Parish
- Location within Spain
- Coordinates: 43.267°N 6.617°W
- Country: Spain
- Autonomous community: Asturias
- Province: Asturias
- Municipality: Allande

Area
  - Total: 34.01 km^{2} (13.13 sq mi)

Population (2024)
  - Total: 605
  - Density: 17.8/km^{2} (46.1/sq mi)

Pola de Allande La Puela
- Town
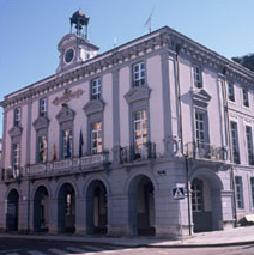

- Flag Coat of arms
- Interactive map of Pola de Allande
- Country: Spain
- Autonomous Community: Asturias
- Municipality: Allande

Area
  - Total: 34.01 km^{2} (13.13 sq mi)
- Elevation: 524 m (1,719 ft)

Population (2011)
  - Total: 733
  - Density: 21.6/km^{2} (55.8/sq mi)
- Postal code: 33880
- Website: https://www.allande.es/

Pola de Allande (Asturian: La Puela) is a town and a parish in Allande, a municipality within the province and autonomous community of Asturias, in northern Spain. It is surrounded by the Cantabrian mountains. It is the capital of the parish. The town was founded between 1262 and 1268. Oviedo, the capital of Asturias, is 104 km (65 mi) away. The Nison River runs through the middle of the town, known for its trout while now fishing is banned there.

The parish is also home to a 15th-century castle, the Palace of Cienfuegos de Peñalba, based on a hill above the town, which has been a symbol for the city for some time.

The town is located on the Camino Primitivo path of the Camino de Santiago.

== Villages ==
As of January 1, 2024, the parish was 34.01 km^{2} (13.13 sq mi) in size with a population of 605. The villages of the parish include:

- Caleyo
- Cereceda (Zreiceda)
- Cimadevilla (Cimavilla)
- Colobredo (Colobreo)
- El Mazo
- Ferroy (Ferrói)
- Fresnedo (Fresnéu)
- La Reigada
- La Roza
- Peñablanca (Penablanca)
- Peñaseita (Penaseita)
- Pola de Allande (La Puela)
- Valbona
- Villafrontú
- Villasonte
