= Pepe el Ferreiro =

Spanish archaeologist (1942–2020)

José María Naveiras Escanlar, commonly known as Pepe el Ferreiro (31 March 1942 – 13 June 2020), was a Spanish archaeologist. He was born in Grandas de Salime, Asturias. He worked as blacksmith in the forge of his father and in other activities related to metallurgy.

Together with two friends he discovered the first dwelling of a castro (village), called Chao Samartín, in 1977. Because of the friendship he had with the owner of the estate, Don Manuel Barcia Monteserín, he was allowed to excavate this buried building, a work he accomplished together with José Manuel Villamea, and together they managed to bring to light an important collection of ceramic fragments. He took the archaeologist D. Miguel Ángel de Blas Cortina of the University of Oviedo to see the Castro, who subsequently studied the excavation site.

== Works and accomplishments ==
- In the year 1983, José Naveiras Escanlar founded the Ethnographic Museum of Grandas de Salime. He investigated anthropological subjects to develop the museum project in the best possible way.
- In October 1984, at the antique ruins of Melgar de Tera that were turned into an improvised mausoleum, he excavated a glass made of fine materials, dated to the first half of the first Century, 10–20 B.C.
- In April 1986, on his own initiative he presented some samples coming from Chao Samartín to Mr. Fernán Alonso, Q.E.D. of the Carbon-14 Department of the Institute for Physics and Chemistry of Rocasolano (The High Council for Scientific Investigations) in Madrid. They did an analysis and dated the castro at the second half of the first century A.D. This has been the first proof.
- When the official excavations at Chao Samartín began, under the direction of Dn. Elías Carrocera and later Ángel Villa Valdés, he modestly cooperated with the team of archaeologists in everything they asked of him.
- After the discovery and in relation to the said above, which is highly important, he published work in the media of communication that are related to these findings, that for obvious reasons as set out here, have no scientific basis; but what they did was give insight into the facts and a widespread knowledge of the actual state of affairs at the excavations of the Castro of Chao Samartín.

== Awards and recognitions ==
- A distinction by the participants of the "First Congress of Ethnography and Ethnology" of the Extensive University Courses of the University of Oviedo, celebrated in Grandas de Salime, in August 1985. Awarding of the medal of the University in the same congress.
- Prize "Principality of Asturias of Tourism", awarded by the Regional Ministry of Tourist Industry and Work, in 1991.
- Member of Honor of the Association for the Defense of Cultural Heritage of Asturias, in 1992.
- "Chosco de Oro" of Navelgas, 1998.
- "Asturian of the Month January" in 2002, in the newspaper La Nueva España.
- Tourism Prize "Tierra Verde", by the Association of Journalists and Writers on Tourism (ASPET) 2002.
- Prize awarded by the Coro de Navia in 2002, on the occasion of its 25th anniversary.
- Distinction of Honor of the Centro Asturiano of Sevilla in 2002.
- Primer "Galardón Pendiente de Oro", awarded by the Association of Hotel Industry and Commerce of Grandas de Salime, in 2002.
- "Urogallo de Bronce", the Centro Asturiano of Madrid 2004.
- Several Recognitions by Institutes of the Península.
- The Obsequio of the Centro Asturiano in México.
- "The things you will see!", as well, as he was awarded the "1st Quijote of Asturias' by the Hermandad de la Probe of Morcín, on the occasion of the 400th anniversary of Don Quixote, in the year of 2005.
- In 2006, the Prize "Los Verdes Valles Mineros" of the Foundation Marino Gutiérrez Suárez in La Felguera.
- The Prize of the Federation of Touristic Associations of Western Asturias, 2008.
- The 'Premio Terra Viva' of Santirso de Abres, 2008
- Corresponding member of the RIDEA.
- He participated as lecturer in various conferences about Ethnography, in Canarias, Galicia, Navarra, Asturias; and in the Swiss cities of Zurich and Basel and in Aargau for the Federation of Asturian Societies in Switzerland.
- He set up expositions about ethnography in Theater Campoamor in Oviedo; at the International Fair of Clermount Ferrand in France; expositions in the Museo de Bellas Artes of Oviedo, Asturias; in the Federation of Asturian Societies in Havana, Cuba. He contributed to several publications, and together with others he wrote the guides for the Museum of Ethnography of Grandas de Salime. Sporadically he wrote for the newspaper La Nueva España and for other media.

== Bibliography ==
- Museo Etnográfico de Grandas de Salime. Guía del visitante Armando Graña García y José Naveiras Escanlar. (Publicaciones del Museo Etnográfico de Grandas de Salime Nº 1, 1984)
- Museo Etnográfico de Grandas de Salime. Guía del visitante. José Naveiras Escanlar, Juaco López Álvarez y Armando Graña García. (Publicaciones del Museo Etnográfico de Grandas de Salime Nº 5, 1991) ISBN 84-7925-015-1
