= Trabada (Grandas de Salime) =

- Parish
- Location within Spain
- Country: Spain
- Autonomous community: Asturias
- Province: Asturias
- Municipality: Grandas de Salime

Trabada is one of seven parishes (administrative divisions) in the municipality of Grandas de Salime, within the province and autonomous community of Asturias, in northern Spain.

The population is 84 (INE 2006).

== Geography ==
The parish is located 18 kilometers from the capital of the council, Grandas.

== Villages and hamlets ==
- Folgosa
- La Coba (A Coba)
- La Fornaza (A Fornaza)
- Llandepereira (Llandepireira)
- Mazo de Riodecabalos
- Molino de la Coba (Molín Da Coba)
- Monteserín Grande (Monteseirín Grande)
- Monteserín Pequeño (Monteseirín Pequeno)
- Trabada
- Valías de la Coba (Valías Da Coba)
