= Salime Reservoir =

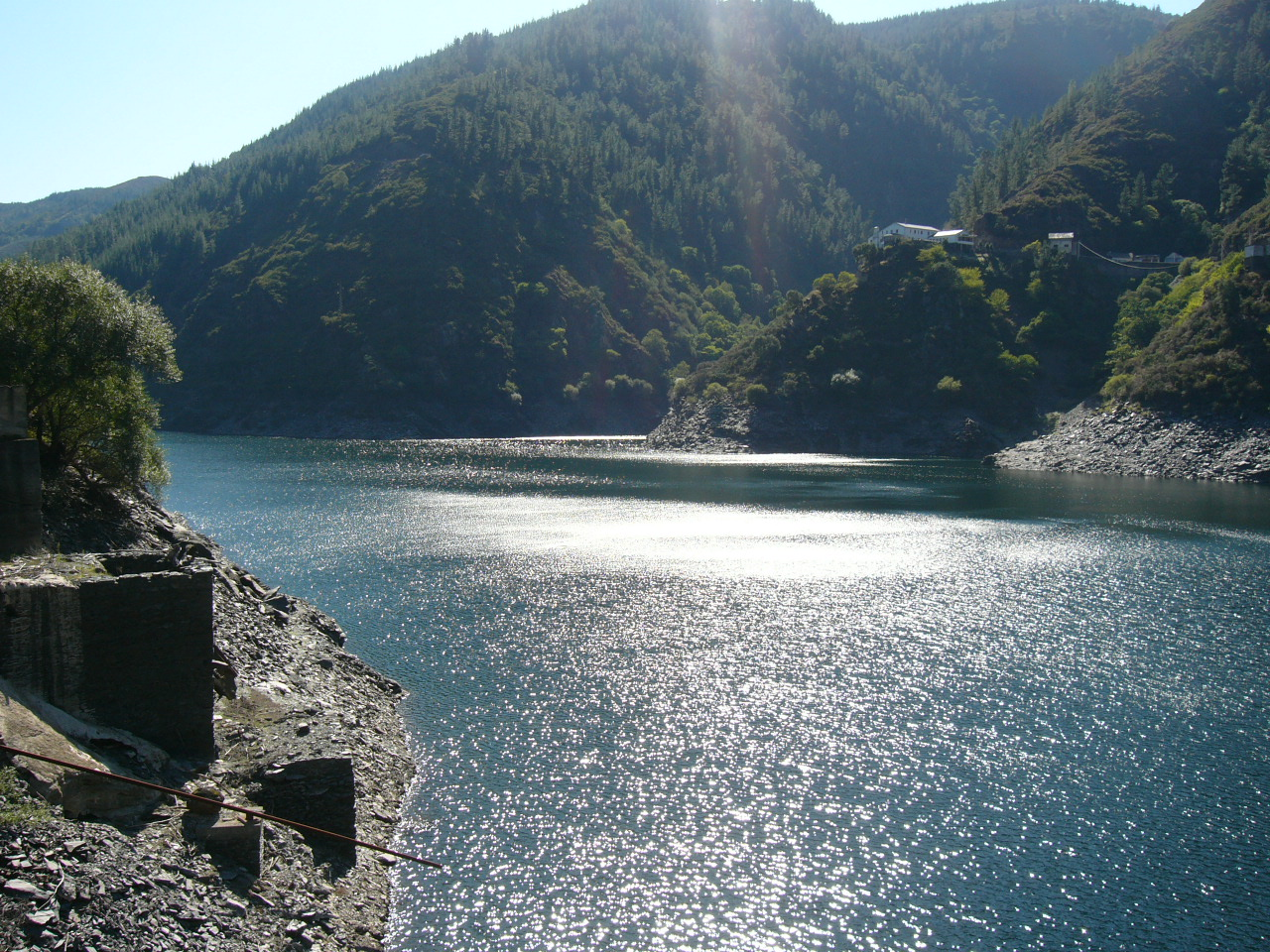
- View of the reservoir

- Location of the Salime reservoir in Asturias
- Country: Spain
- Location: Grandas de Salime, Asturias
- Coordinates: 43°14′10″N 6°50′52″W
- Construction began: 1948
- Opening date: 1954
- Owner: Saltos del Navia en Comunidad

Dam and spillways
- Type of dam: Gravity dam
- Impounds: Navia River
- Height: 125.67 m (412.3 ft)
- Length: 250 m (820 ft)
- Dam volume: 645,000 m^{3} (844,000 yd^{3})
- Spillways: 1 main
- Spillway capacity: 1,658 m^{3}/s (58,600 cu ft/s)

Reservoir
- Creates: Salime Reservoir
- Total capacity: 266.3 hm^{3} (215,900 acre⋅ft)
- Catchment area: 1,806 km^{2} (697 sq mi)
- Surface area: 685 ha (1,690 acres)

Power Station
- Turbines: 4x 32MW Francis
- Installed capacity: 128 MW
- Annual generation: 350,000,000 KWh

Salime Reservoir is a reservoir in Asturias, Spain across the Navia River. It is the third reservoir built in this river after Arbón and Doiras.

It is formed by a 128 meters high Gravity dam and it is located at the confluence of the municipalities of Pesoz, Grandas de Salime and Allande. The road AS-14 runs over the dam. The occupied area by the reservoir is 685 ha between Grandas de Salime and Ibias in Asturias and Negueira de Muñiz in Lugo.

The dam serves mainly to generate hydroelectric power, but it is also used for recreational uses.

== History ==
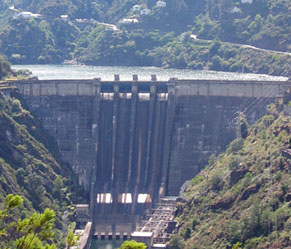
Dam at Grandas de Salime

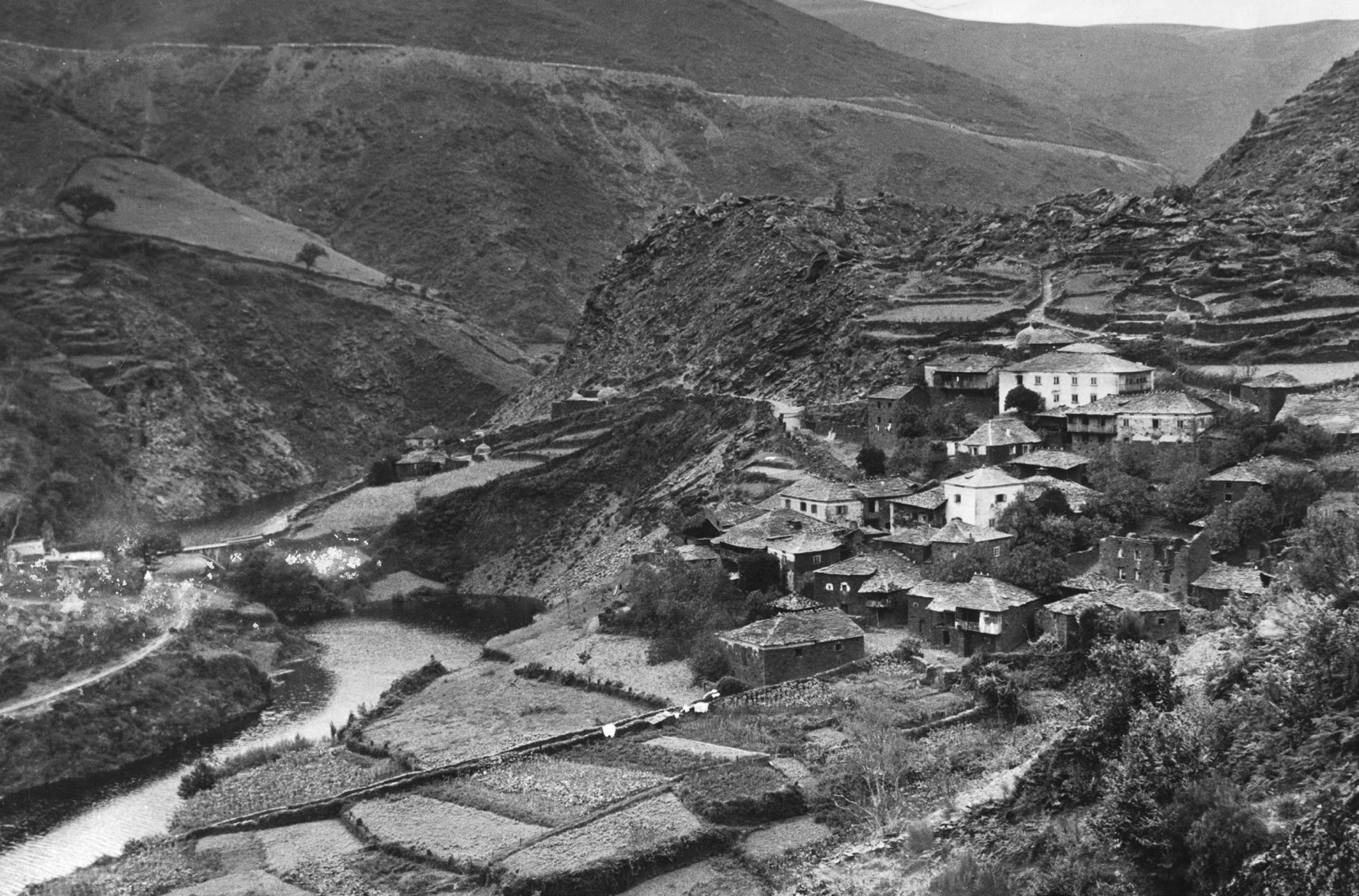
View of the town of Salime from the South in 1952

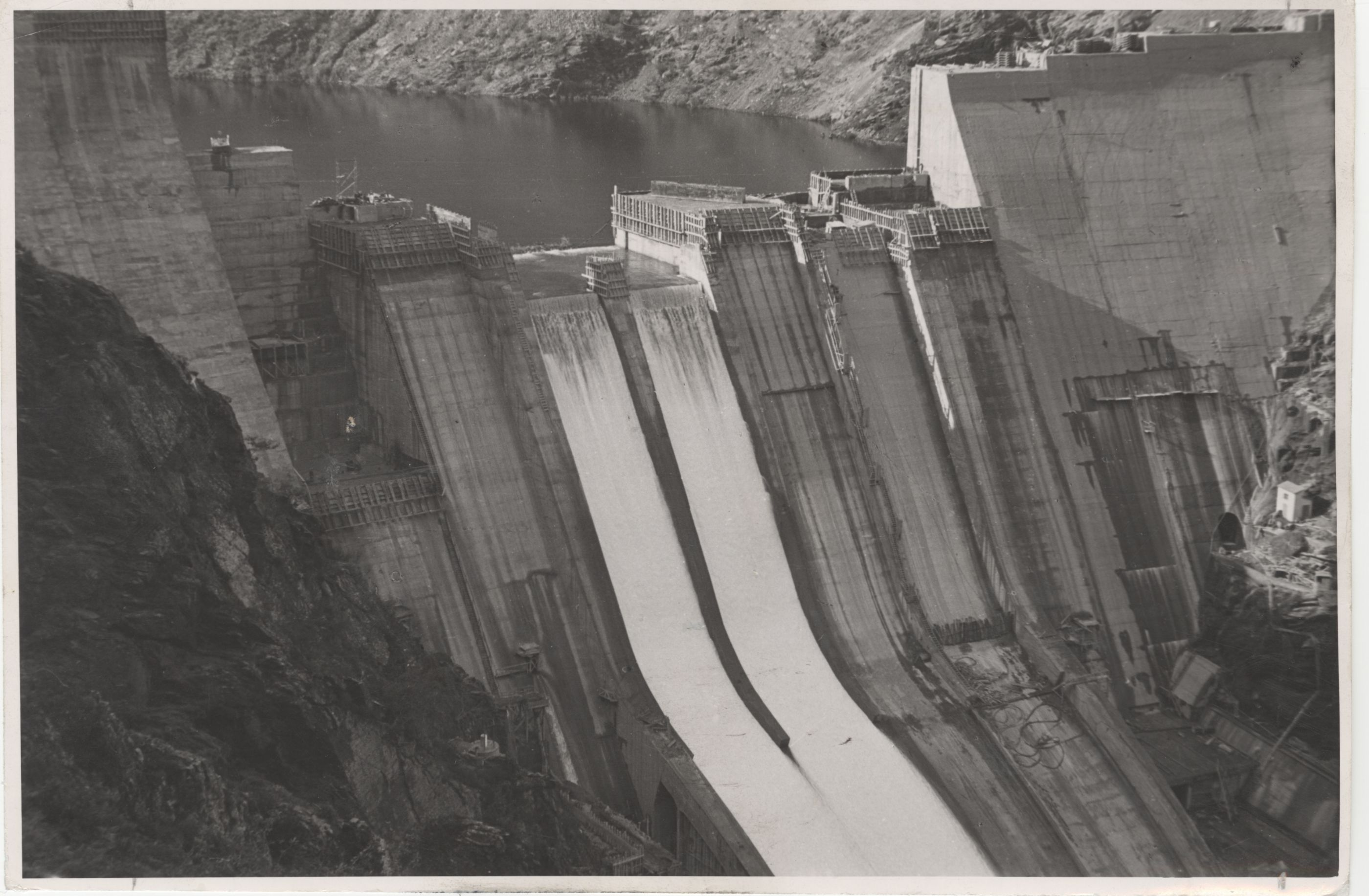
Construction of the dam in 1955 (Archivio storico Touring Club Italiano)

=== Planning ===
The idea of building a power station in the zone started in 1940 in the location where Narciso Hernández Vaquero planned originally.

Immediately after the World War II, the project, made by the architect Joaquin Vaquero Palacios, and the construction started. For paying the works, the companies Hidroeléctrica del Cantábrico and Electra de Viesgo created the company Saltos del Navia en Comunidad, endorsed by Banco Urquijo, whose office prepared the technical reports.

=== Previous works ===
The works started in 1946, being necessary to divert the river. For that purpose, a tunnel of 30,725 m^{3} was dug. 11,789 m^{3} of concrete were used to coat it.

The supply of materials was made by a 36 km cable car that reached the port of Navia. Four villages were also built to host more than 3,500 workers.

=== The dam ===
The dam was built between 1948 and 1953 with 630,000 m^{3} of concrete with slopes of 5% upstream and 72% downstream. The height above the foundation was 132 meters, so that once stood as the largest dam of Spain and second in Europe.

It is located 22 km upstream of the Doiras reservoir, and to build it there were enormous difficulties. Spain was plunged into misery and suffering the embargo of the victorious powers in World War II. This project was a dream almost impossible and yet was completed in 1954 despite the lack of resources. Although the United Nations had declared the embargo against Francoist Spain, the United Kingdom secretly supplied the turbines and the generators.

During the works, between 100 and 300 workers died due to poor working conditions.

=== Environmental impact ===
For the construction of the reservoir, it was necessary to flood 685 ha. 1,955 fincas with about 40,000 trees composed this surface. Also, several roads were closed, like the old AS-34, which was replaced by the new AS-14. This new road passes above the dam.

In some places there were created routes with boats to cross the reservoir.
