= A Mesa (Grandas de Salime) =

- Parish
- Location within Spain
- Country: Spain
- Autonomous community: Asturias
- Province: Asturias
- Municipality: Grandas de Salime

A Mesa is one of seven parishes (administrative divisions) in the municipality of Grandas de Salime, within the province and autonomous community of Asturias, in northern Spain.

The population is 32 (INE 2006).

== Villages and hamlets ==
- A Mesa
- Buspol
- El Toucedo
- Valiamayor
- El Vilar de Buspol
