= Manuel Abad y Queipo =

Bishop of Valladolid

- Bishop-elect
- Diocese: Michoacán, México
- Installed: 1810 (not confirmed)
- Term ended: 1822
- Predecessor: Marcos de Moriana y Zafrilla
- Successor: Juan Cayetano Gómez de Portugal y Solís

Personal details
- Born: 26 August 1751 Villarpedre, Asturias
- Died: 15 September 1825 (aged 74) Toledo, Spain
- Denomination: Roman Catholic

Manuel Abad y Queipo (26 August 1751 – 15 September 1825) was a Spanish Roman Catholic Bishop of Michoacán in the Viceroyalty of New Spain at the time of the Mexican War of Independence. He was "an acute social commentator of late colonial Mexico, ... an exemplification of the enlightened clergyman".

== Education and early career ==
Manuel Abad y Queipo was born out of wedlock to an Asturian nobleman on 26 August 1751 in Santa Maria de Villarpedre. He obtained his baccalaureate in law and canon law from the University of Salamanca. Thereafter he went to Guatemala with Bishop Monroy. In Guatemala he was ordained a priest. Beginning in 1784 he resided in Valladolid (now Morelia), where Bishop Antonio San Miguel made him a judge in a canon law court. In that position he gained considerable knowledge about church wealth in terms of capital and credit. In 1805 he obtained a doctorate in canon law from the University of Guadalajara. In 1810 he was nominated as Bishop-elect of Michoacan, but was never confirmed in the post. On the death of Bishop San Miguel, the Council of the Indies named him canon of the cathedral of Valladolid, a position which he held until 1815.

In 1807, he traveled to Spain to seek his habilitation, since his status as a child born out of wedlock prohibited his promotion to the higher levels of the ecclesiastical hierarchy. He returned to New Spain in the position of vicar general. In 1810, the Regency (the Spanish government fighting the French invasion) named him bishop-elect of Michoacán. He took over the diocese before the arrival of the pontifical bull confirming his position. The pope did not approve his nomination, and thus the bull never arrived.

== Political activity in New Spain ==
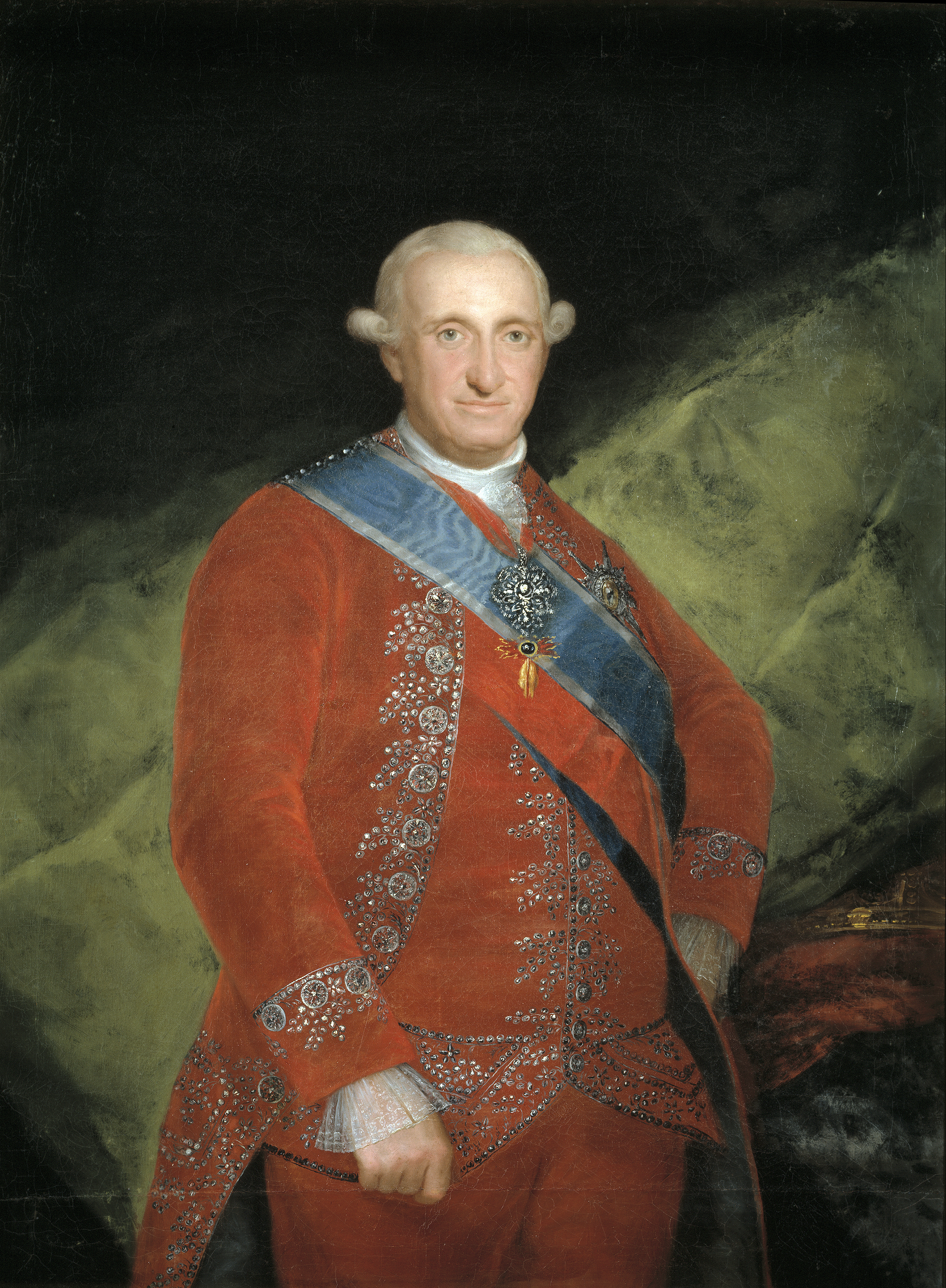
Charles IV of Spain

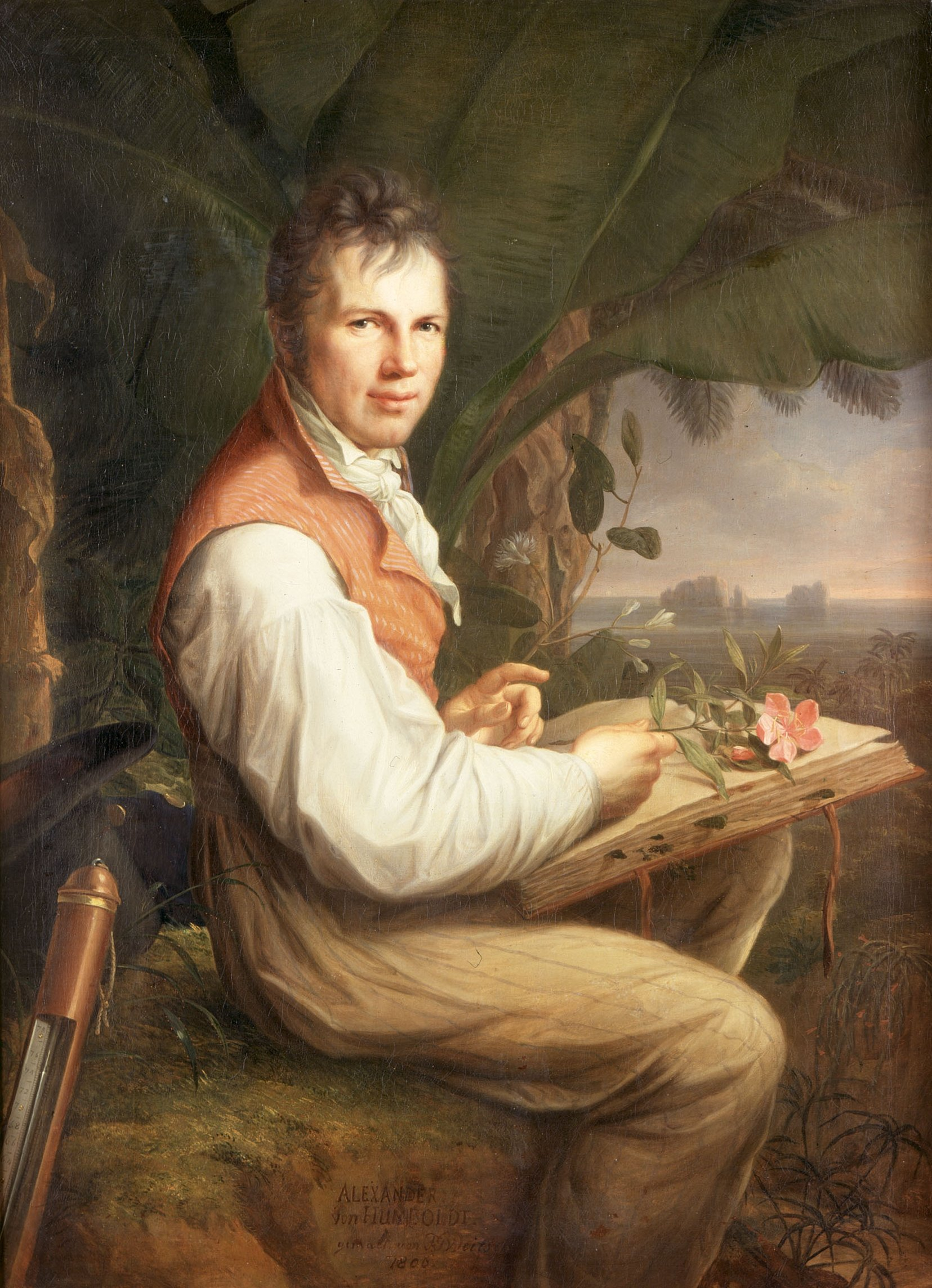
Alexander von Humboldt, whose Political Essay on the Kingdom of New Spain was influenced by Abad y Queipo's writings

Although born in Spain, Abad y Queipo felt at home in New Spain, saying he was "an American by voluntary adoption". He had strong views about New Spain and its place within the Spanish empire, saying that the crown gave Mexico's indigenous equal rights with the conquering Spaniards and that Spain despite its decline had "made the American possessions flourish until they were the envy of Europeans". He considered the decline of Spain could be attributed to emigration to the overseas territories. He critiqued economic inequality in New Spain, "in America there is no graduation or middle ground: everyone is either rich or poverty stricken, noble or infamous" leading to conflict.

In 1799 he wrote to King Charles IV a report entitled Representación al rey, sobre immunidades del clero (Description to the King, of the Immunities of the Clergy). In this document he outlined the social and political situation in New Spain and explained the symptoms of discontent. He proposed the general abolition of tribute levied on the indigenous; the free distribution of royal lands; agrarian land reform in Mexico that would permit poor people to obtain 20- or 30-year "leases" on uncultivated land belonging to the large landowners, but without paying rent; and the right to establish cotton and woolen mills.

In 1804 he opposed Godoy's Cédula de la Caja de Consolidación. The Act of Consolidation sought to transfer wealth from the church to the crown by calling in all mortgages that were held by the church, which was a direct attack on the elite land holders in New Spain whose wealth was invested in haciendas and whose mortgages held by the church. This order was the equivalent of disentailment of the church because it ordered the transfer of income from the religious estates and foundations to the government, but its attack on the land holding elites' source of wealth did not shore up their loyalty to the crown. Abad y Queipo's memorial to the crown "pointed out that the withdrawal of the vast loans of the Church would paralyze agriculture and business". In 1805 and 1807 he forwarded two other reports to the king.

His writings critiquing society in New Spain influenced Alexander von Humboldt, who spent a year in the viceroyalty 1803–04. Abad y Queipo presented Humboldt with his published writings when the cleric visited Paris in 1806. Humboldt's Political Essay on the Kingdom of New Spain was one of his first publications from his five-year sojourn to Spanish America and drew heavily on Abad's memorials. Humboldt took Abad y Queipo's argument about the low condition of Mexico's indigenous population as impeding progress in the viceroyalty, which Abad had first mentioned in a 1799 memorial to Bishop Antonio de San Miguel. Their multiple languages, ties to their home communities, collective land tenure which the crown had protected now were their chains preventing individual advancement. Although Abad y Queipo deplored the situation of the Indians, he did not blame them for it, viewing it not due to inherent racial or character flaws but to crown protectionism. Abad y Queipo drew on the writings of reformist Spaniard Gaspar Melchor de Jovellanos's Informe de ley agraria. He was also influenced by Adam Smith's The Wealth of Nations and drew on the writings of Montesquieu. The replication of Abad y Queipo's arguments in Humboldt's work doubtless gave them a larger audience than they previously garnered.

== During New Spain's insurgency ==
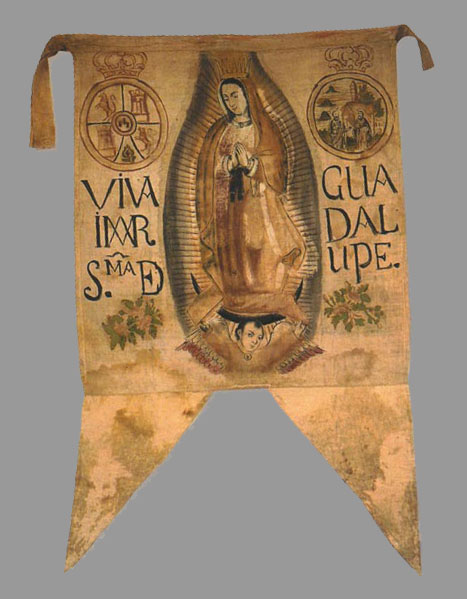
Banner with the image of the Virgin of Guadalupe carried by Miguel Hidalgo and his insurgent followers, an act Abad y Queipo denounced as a sacrilege.

The Bourbon Reforms had resulted in the virtual exclusion of American-born Spanish men from attaining high office, and increased alienation between peninsular-born Spaniards and the American-born. Abad y Queipo recognized the criollos resentment and suggested that the rift be softened by sending criollos to Spain for education and that the crown appoint elite criollos to high positions in the government in Spain, in the military and the Catholic Church, as well as allowing those in New Spain to be appointed to high office in Peru and vice versa. The increasing alienation of criollos from the Spanish crown flared into open rebellion in 1810 with the revolt of secular priest Miguel Hidalgo.

Abad y Queipo had been friends with Hidalgo, who had come before the Inquisition. With the outbreak of violence led by Hidalgo in September 1810, Abad y Queipo himself came under suspicion and was denounced to the Inquisition by Fermín Peñalosa y Antón for his being "delinquent in matters of faith". Abad y Queipo strongly and energetically opposed the violent movement for Mexican independence from Spain. This was perhaps due his belief that the economic and social progress he sought was threatened with destruction by movement led by his friend Hidalgo. Abad had also sought the friendship of members of the revolutionary juntas of Valladolid (now Morelia) and San Miguel el Grande (now San Miguel de Allende).

On 24 September 1810, Abad y Queipo published the decree excommunicating insurgents Hidalgo, Ignacio Allende, Juan Aldama, and Mariano Abasolo. Hidalgo's excommunication was for Hidalgo's having "raised a standard of rebellion and seduced a number of innocent people," but it was for rebellion against the crown's authority not the Church's. The insurgents disputed the legality of the excommunication, based on the lack of papal approval of Abad y Queipo's appointment, which he disputed, and Archbishop Lizana confirmed the order of excommunication.

There were some prominent parish priests among the insurgents, most especially Hidalgo and José María Morelos. Abad y Queipo claimed in September 1812 that the majority of priests were loyal to the crown and few were insurgents, saying "even among Jesus's disciples there was a Judas." Contemporaries, including Lucas Alamán and later scholars have emphasized priests' participation in the insurgency, and evidence shows that they participated in larger numbers than Abad y Queipo estimated, but in fewer numbers than contemporaries thought.

In 1815 Abad y Queipo sent another report to the king (Ferdinand VII now), denouncing the mistakes of Viceroy Félix María Calleja and the lack of prudence of Lardizábal, minister of the Indies. Ferdinand recalled Abad y Queipo to Spain since "he was suspected of dangerous liberal views." He was eventually confirmed as bishop of Michoacan, but could not return to Mexico. Following Mexican independence in 1821, Abad y Queipo resigned that post and became bishop of Tortosa.

== Return to Spain ==
He obtained an interview with Ferdinand VII, who not only pardoned him, but named him Minister of Grace and Justice in the royal government. This occurred on 24 June 1816, but on 27 June the Inquisition brought its case again, accusing Abad y Queipo of being a friend of the insurgents, living an irreligious life, and holding revolutionary ideas. He was imprisoned two months in the jail of the Inquisition.

The Spanish revolution of 1820 in which the liberal Spanish Constitution of 1812 was restored and the crown becoming a constitutional monarchy again created a provisional junta and Abad y Queipo became a member of the provisional junta. He was charged with overseeing the conduct of King Ferdinand. Later he was a deputy to the Cortes for the province of Asturias. Even later he was named bishop of Tortosa, but once again the papal bull confirming his position did not arrive.

In 1824 came the absolutist reaction, after Ferdinand was again restored to the throne. Abad y Queipo was now old and deaf, but he was imprisoned again, this time in the monastery of Sisla, in Toledo. He died a prisoner in 1825.

== Works and legacy ==
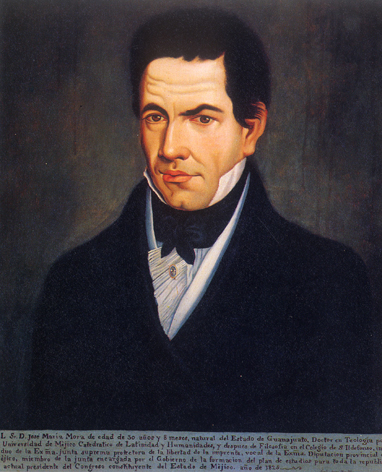
Nineteenth-century Mexican liberal José María Luis Mora, who republished some of Abad's writings

Many of his writings were published in Semanario Político y Literario (Political and Literary Seminar) and in Observador de la República Mexicana (Observer of the Mexican Republic), the newspaper that José María Luis Mora edited. The Colección de escritos más importantes (Collection of the Most Important Writings) was published in Mexico City in 1813. His "Testamento político" ("Political Testament") was published in the Historia of Lucas Alamán. An important collection of his writings is Colección de los escritos mas importantes que en diferentes épocas dirigió al gobierno D. Manual Abad Queipo, obispo electo de Michoacán. Historian D.A. Brading notes that Abad y Queipo's writing are notable for "the complete absence of any material dealing with religion".

Humboldt read the writings of Abad y Queipo, and the bishop-elect's observations made their way into Humboldt's Political Essay on the Kingdom of New Spain. Abad y Queipo's writings had a significant impact on Mexican liberalism in the post-independence period, with secular priest and liberal ideologue Mora reprinting important works, "thereby ensuring their influence over the development of Mexican radicalism...Abad y Queipo is best regarded as the intellectual progenitor of Mexican Liberalism."
