= Pesoz =

Pesoz Pezós (Eonavian)
- Municipality
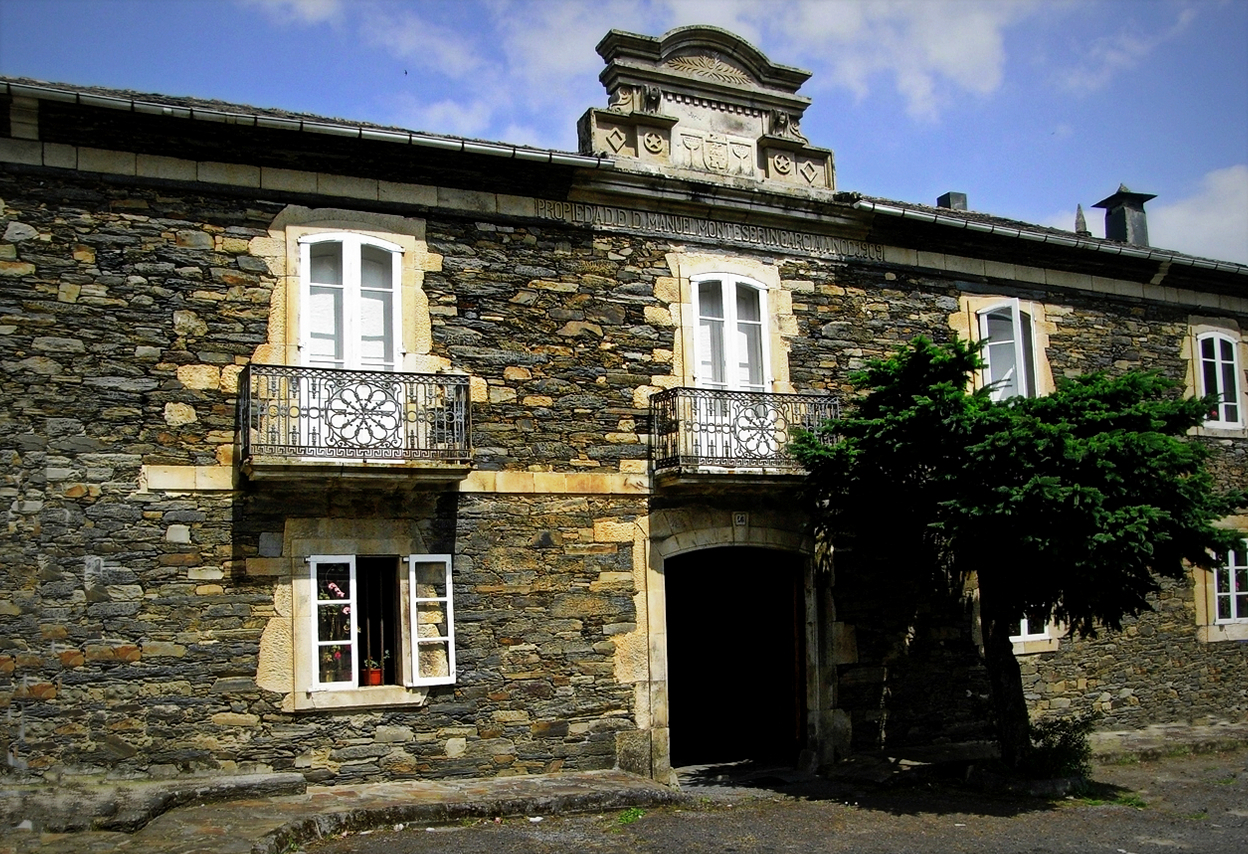
- Palacio de Ron

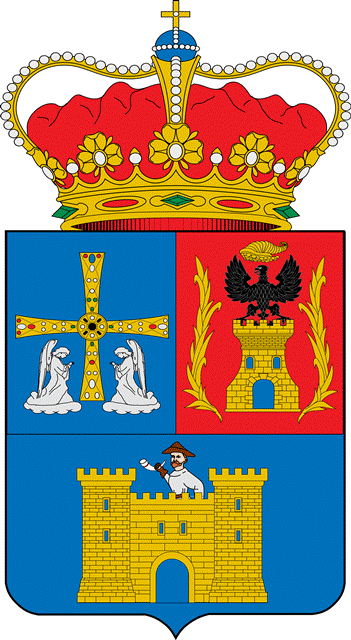
- Flag Coat of arms

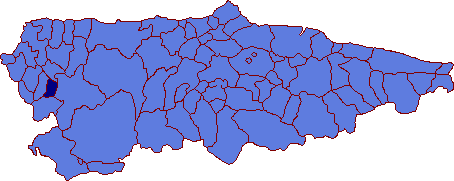

- Location in Spain
- Coordinates: 43°15′N 6°52′W
- Country: Spain
- Autonomous community: Asturias
- Province: Asturias
- Comarca: Eo-Navia
- Judicial district: Castropol
- Capital: Santiago de Pesoz

Government
  - Alcalde: José Valledor Pereda (PSOE)

Area
  - Total: 38.97 km^{2} (15.05 sq mi)
- Highest elevation: 856 m (2,808 ft)

Population (2025-01-01)
  - Total: 134
  - Density: 3.44/km^{2} (8.91/sq mi)
- Demonym: pesocenses
- Time zone: UTC+1 (CET)
  - Summer (DST): UTC+2 (CEST)
- Postal code: 33735

Pesoz (Eonavian: Pezós) is a municipality and the only parish in that municipality in the Autonomous Community of the Principality of Asturias, Spain. It is one of the least populated municipalities in Asturias. It is bordered on the north by Illano, on the south by Grandas de Salime, on the east by Allande and on the west by San Martín de Oscos.

The municipality consists of only one parish, Pesoz.

== Geography ==
Pesoz is crossed by two rivers: Agüeira and Navia, joining the first one in the second, close to the Doiras reservoir. Navia river is the limit of the municipality with Illano.

Pesoz is located in the confluence of the rivers Agüeira and Aio, and the population is established in the proximities of Palacio de Ron.

== History ==
It is comprobated Pesoz had population since Neolithic. Also there were mines since Romanization.

In the 20th century, the creation of the Salime reservoir positively affected to its population. When it finished, people left Pesoz giving it serious economic and social troubles.

== See also ==
- List of municipalities in Asturias
