= Grandas de Salime =

- Municipality
- Coat of arms

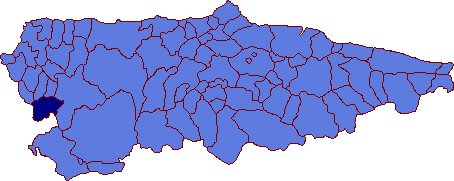

- Location in Spain
- Coordinates: 43°13′N 6°52′W
- Country: Spain
- Autonomous community: Asturias
- Province: Asturias
- Comarca: Eo-Navia
- Judicial district: Castropol
- Capital: Grandas

Government
  - Alcalde: Eustaquio Revilla Villegas (PSOE)

Area
  - Total: 112.55 km^{2} (43.46 sq mi)
- Highest elevation: 1,204 m (3,950 ft)

Population (2025-01-01)
  - Total: 767
  - Density: 6.81/km^{2} (17.7/sq mi)
- Demonym: grandaleses
- Time zone: UTC+1 (CET)
  - Summer (DST): UTC+2 (CEST)
- Postal code: 33730 to 33739
- Official language(s): Spanish, Eonavian
- Website: Official website

Grandas de Salime is a municipality in the Autonomous Community of the Principality of Asturias, Spain. It is famous for its hydroelectric dam across the Navia River, forming the Embalse de Salime (reservoir of Salime). It is also famous for being a stop along the Camino Primitivo path of the Camino de Santiago, where it is the last stretch of Asturian land before the entrance into Galicia through the Acebo Pass.

The municipality is situated in the interior of the eastern region of Asturias, bordered on the south by the Galician province of Lugo, on the north by the Asturian municipalities of Santa Eulalia de Oscos, San Martín de Oscos, Pesoz and Allande. The village has an ethnographic museum which occupies the former governing house of Grandas. Geologically, the region is dominated by deposits of shale and quartzite.

The hydroelectric dam turned 50 years old in 2004. Its inside is adorned with a large mural by the architect of the dam, Joaquin Vaquero Palacios.

== Parishes ==
- Grandas
- La Mesa
- Negueira
- Peñafuente
- Trabada
- Villarpedre
- Vitos

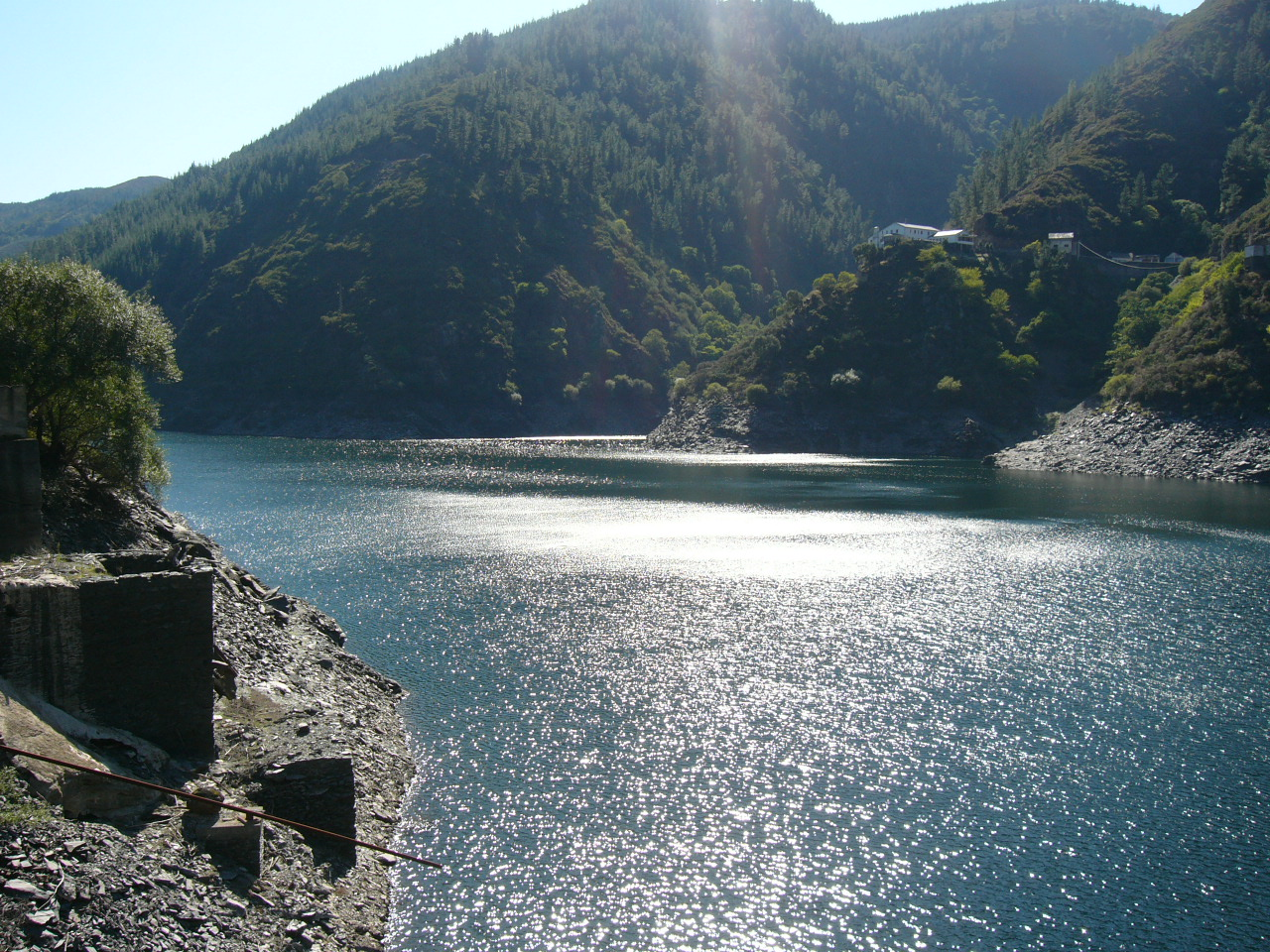
Embalse de Salime

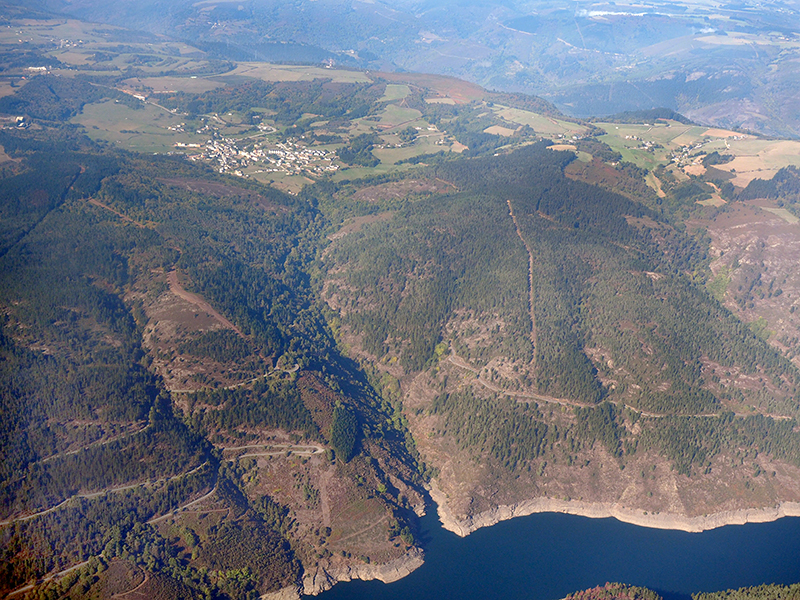
Aerial view of Grandas de Salime

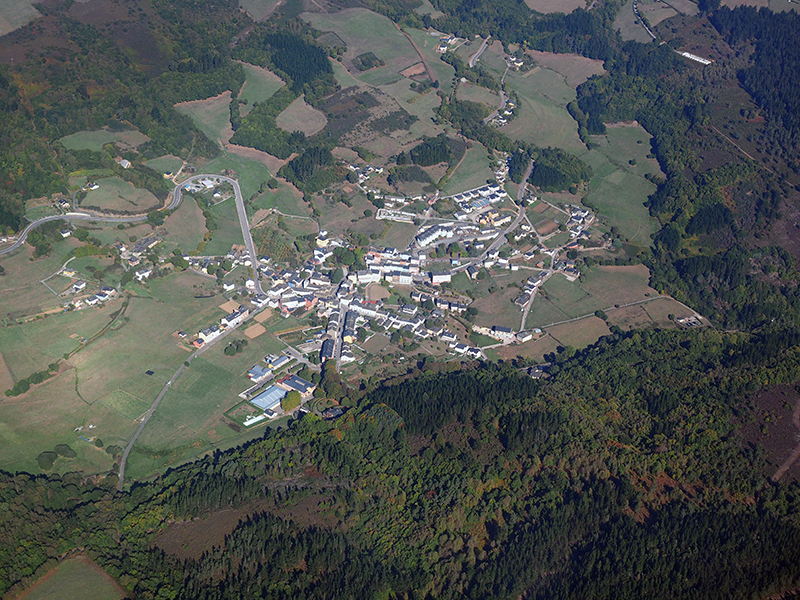
Grandas de Salime, aerial panorama view

== Famous people ==
- Manuel Abad y Queipo, religious figure and minister of the 18th century.
- Pepe el Ferreiro, founder of the Ethnographic Museum of Grandas de Salime.

== See also ==
- List of municipalities in Asturias
