= Penafonte =

- Parish
- Location within Spain
- Country: Spain
- Autonomous community: Asturias
- Province: Asturias
- Municipality: Grandas de Salime
- Elevation: 830 m (2,720 ft)

Bustelo del Camín, on the Primitive Way of Saint James in Penafonte

Penafonte is one of seven parishes (administrative divisions) in the municipality of Grandas de Salime, within the province and autonomous community of Asturias, in northern Spain.

According to the tourism board of Grandas de Salime, it is the last village on the Camino Primitivo in Asturia before the trail crosses into Galicia. It is home to a church dedicated to Mary Magdalene constructed in 1605, according to an inscription.

According to the INE 2006, the population of the parish is 90.

== Villages and hamlets ==
- A Brañota
- A Lleira
- A Pontiga
- A Viñola
- Bustelo del Camín
- Penafonte
- Penafurada
- Silvañá
- Soane
- Teixeira
- Valabilleiro
- Veigadecima
- Xestoselo
- Xestoso
