= Ethnographic Museum of Grandas de Salime =

Coordinates: 43.21761°N 6.87466°W

Grandas de Salime Ethnographic Museum
- Museo Etnográfico de Grandas de Salime
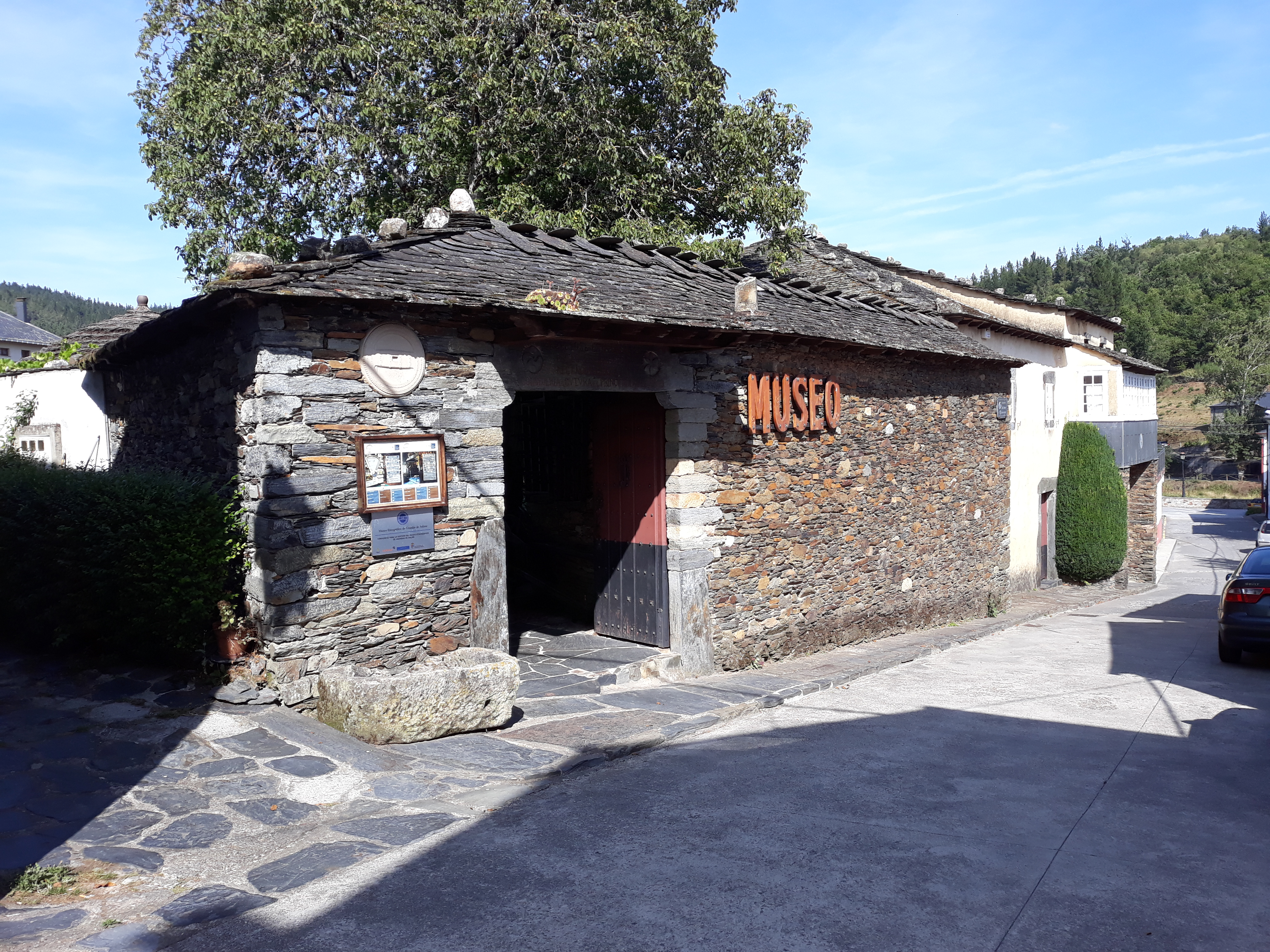
- Established: 1984
- Location: Grandas de Salime, Asturias, Spain
- Type: Ethnographic museum
- Website: Museo de Grandas

The Grandas de Salime Ethnographic Museum (in Spanish: El Museo Etnográfico de Grandas de Salime) is a museum in Grandas de Salime, Asturias, Spain. It was founded by archaeologist José Naveiras Escanlar, also known as Pepe el Ferreiro, in 1984. It is an open-air museum that displays the traditional, peasant way of life in the region. It is managed by the Ethnographic Museums Network of Asturias (in Spanish: La Red de Museos Etnográficos de Asturias).

The museum's mission is to collect, preserve, maintain, expand, investigate, communicate and disseminate the tangible and intangible heritage of an ethnographic nature from Western Asturias.

== Overview ==
The Grandas de Salime Ethnographic Museum occupies an area of approximately 3,150 m², and its permanent collection comprises over 11,000 objects that have been acquired from donations, some of them from the residents of Grandas de Salime, or that have been purchased by the Consortium. Areas of the museum include:

=== The Rectory ===
The Rectory is a building built in 1814 upon the site of a previous, deteriorating building. In 1828, its hórreo was replaced with a new one purchased from a nearby town. The hórreo and the cellar built underneath, used as a stable or warehouse, was demolished in the early 20th century. Before the building was repurposed as a museum, its upper floor served as a living quarters and its lower floor was used as a stable and cellar. Spaces recreated in the Rectory include a kitchen and fireplace, linen and wool production area, event hall, bedroom, cobbler's workshop, food storage cellar, store, carpenter's workshop, and forge.

=== Mill ===
A hydraulic flour mill was built in 1994. Its accompanying mill house is a two-story structure that hosts multipurpose spaces for the museum today.

=== The Mansion ===
The mansion was constructed in 1999 to recreate the houses of rural nobility or well-off peasants. It was constructed with materials from a house built in the 17th century. Spaces recreated in the mansion include a general store, mid-20th century barber shop, tailor's shop, kitchen, late 20th-century dentist clinic, health clinic, and a school.

=== Other ===
Other structures include a modern chapel, a type of hórreo called a panera, well, a grass hut for storying hay, a cortín, a type of granary called a cabazo, and a soda factory.
