= Chao Samartín =

Coordinates: 43.1986°N 6.9260°W

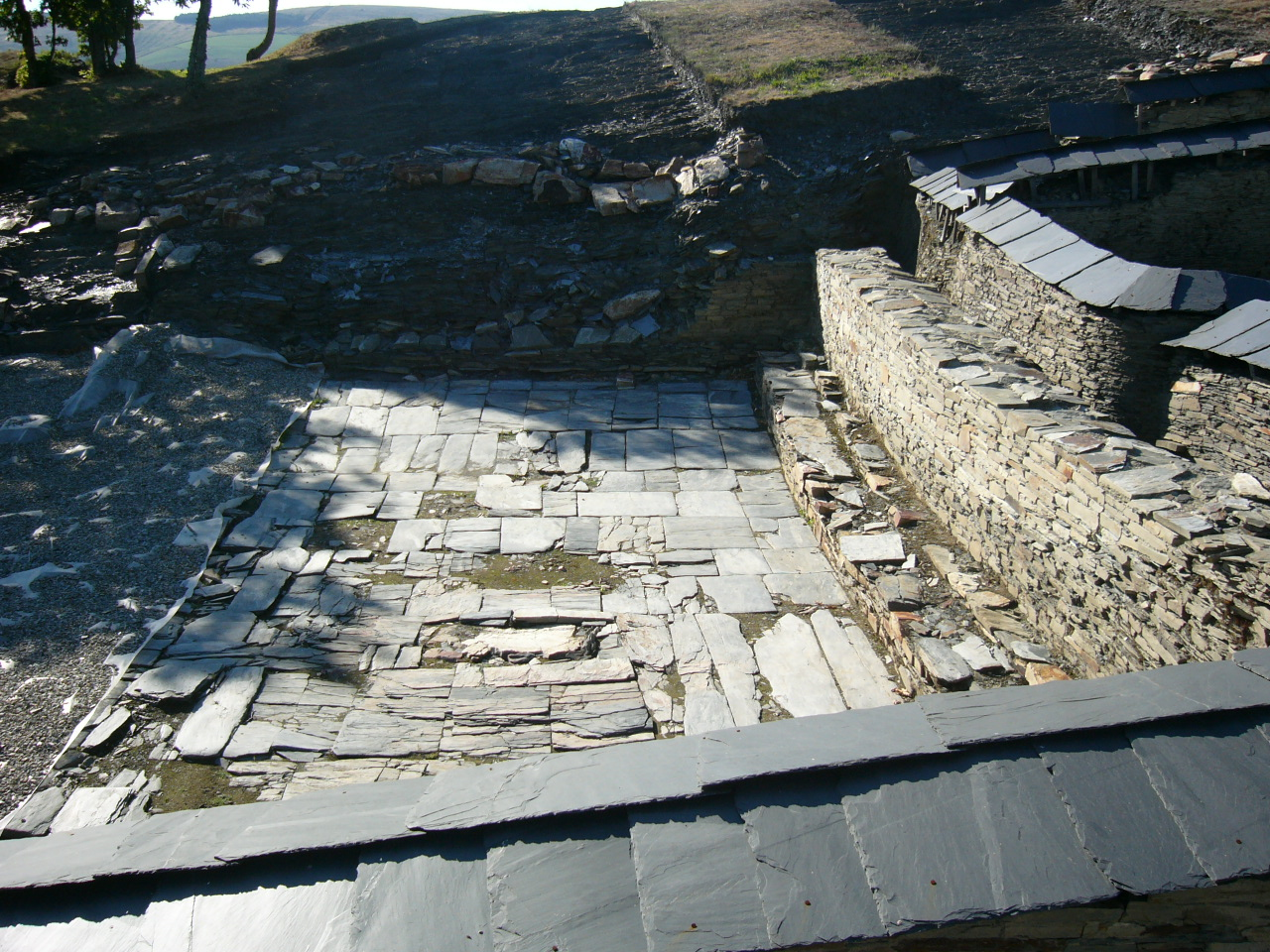
Central place of the castro

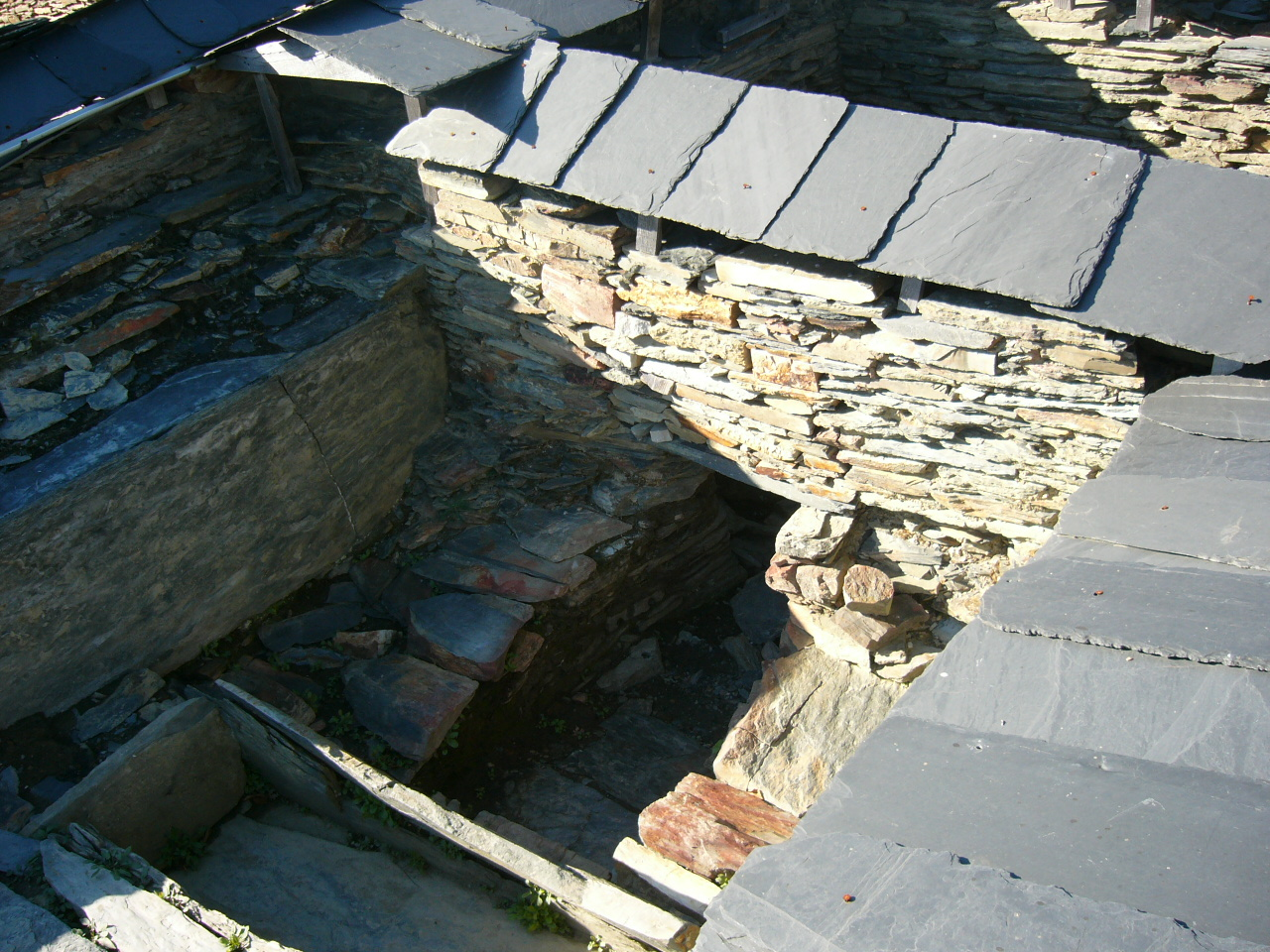
Public baths dating back to before the arrival of the Romans

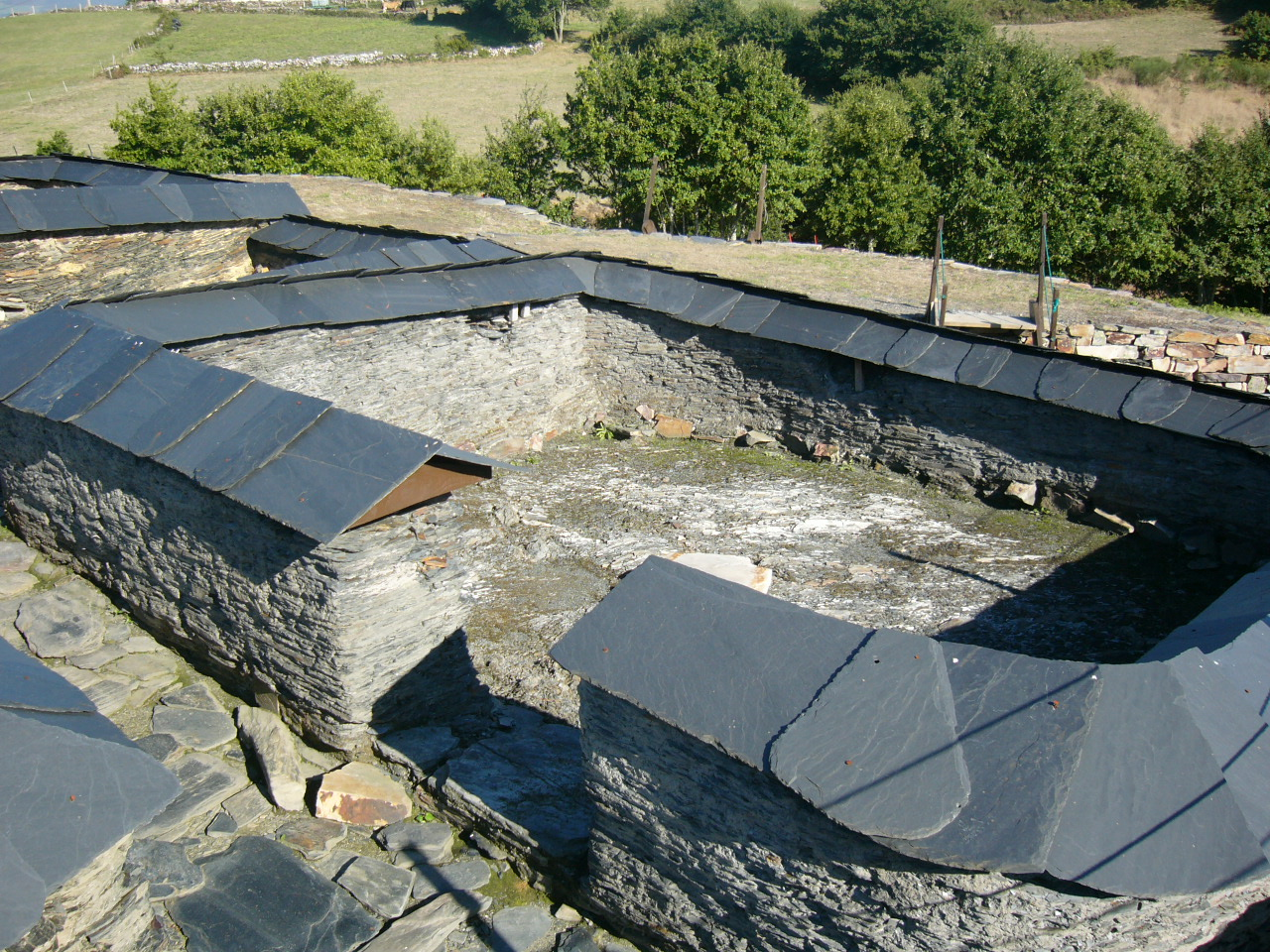
Building with a rectangular plan

Chao Samartín is a Castro located in the municipality of Grandas, (Grandas de Salime - Asturias). It was founded in the Bronze Age, around the year 800 BCE. The castro was discovered in 1977.

== Bronze Age ==
The beginnings of this fortified village lay toward the end of the Bronze Age (about 3,000 years ago); the first defenses are from this period, a moat and a palisade that surround a sacred enclosure with an entrance preceded by some large rocks. Inside a building was located that is quite large for its era (some 60 m^{2}).

== Iron Age ==
Already in the Iron Age the inhabited area of the castro started to grow considerably. In the 4th century. the defenses existed of a wall and several moats that in their interior contained dwellings of circular and rectangular plan with rounded corners. These dwellings had one room and a roof of plant materials. The only entrance to the village was from the south through a large gate over a moat. The inhabitants were farmers, prepared foods in ceramic pots and pans and used tools of iron, copper, silver, and gold, as is shown by the objects that have been found at this location. In this era, the first sauna in this castro was built.

== Roman Period ==
With the arrival of the Roman Empire, a period of peace and prosperity began that altered the defensive character of the hill fort because the inhabitants started to take advantage of the fact that nearby several gold mines were found. Their prosperity came to a halt when the settlement was suddenly abandoned after an earthquake taking place toward the 2nd century CE.

== Excavations ==
Excavation of the castro were begun in 1990 and there is still a large part of the village hidden under the soil that has not been studied yet. Investigations showed that the settlement was suddenly abandoned, which is explained by findings of many tools, jewelry, and other objects of value that pertain to the Roman Period.

== See also ==
- Castro culture
