= Vitos =

- Parish
- Location within Spain
- Country: Spain
- Autonomous community: Asturias
- Province: Asturias
- Municipality: Grandas de Salime

Vitos is one of seven parishes (administrative divisions) in the municipality of Grandas de Salime, within the province and autonomous community of Asturias, in northern Spain.

The population is 20 (INE 2006).

== Villages and hamlets ==
- Brualla
- Magadán
- Puente de Vitos (A Ponte de Vitos)
- Vitos
