= Navia (river) =

River in Spain

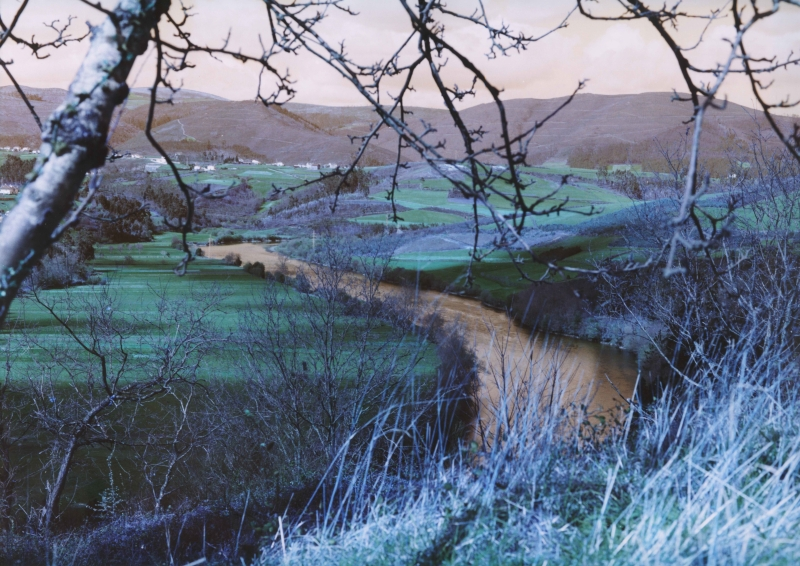
- View of the Navia River.

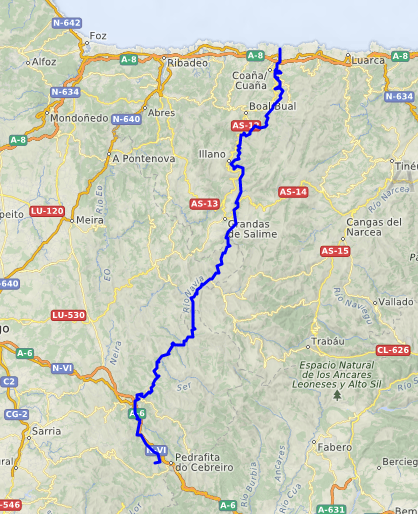
- Course of the Navia

Location
- Country: Spain
- State: Asturias; Galicia
- Region: Lugo, Allande, Boal, Coaña, Grandas de Salime, Ibias, Illano, Navia, Pesoz, Villayón

Physical characteristics
- Source
  - location: Lugo
- Mouth
  - location: Bay of Biscay
  - coordinates: 43°33′00″N 6°44′00″W
  - elevation: 0 m (0 ft)
- Length: 99.4 km (61.8 mi)
- Basin size: 2,572 km^{2} (993 sq mi)

The Navia is a river in northern Spain flowing South to North from Galicia into the Autonomous Community of Asturias. It discharges into the Bay of Biscay through an estuary called Ría de Navia.

== See also ==
- List of rivers of Spain
- Rivers of Galicia
