= Melgar de Tera =

Coordinates: 41°58′N 6°00′W

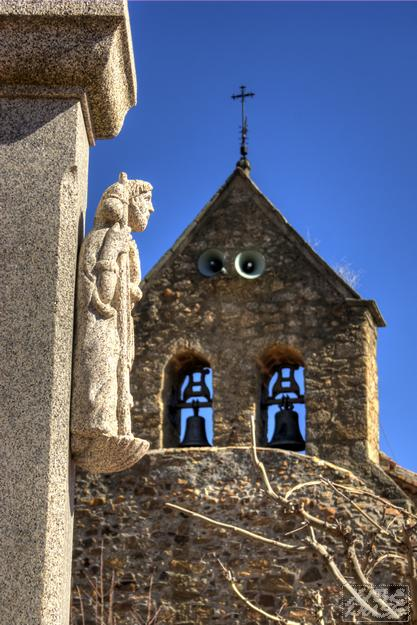

- Coat of arms
- Interactive map of Melgar de Tera
- Country: Spain
- Autonomous community: Castile and León
- Province: Zamora
- Municipality: Melgar de Tera

Area
  - Total: 41 km^{2} (16 sq mi)

Population (2025-01-01)
  - Total: 331
  - Density: 8.1/km^{2} (21/sq mi)
- Time zone: UTC+1 (CET)
  - Summer (DST): UTC+2 (CEST)
- Website: Official website

Melgar de Tera is a municipality located in the province of Zamora, Castile and León, Spain. According to the 2004 census (INE), the municipality has a population of 530 inhabitants.
