= Grandas de Salime (parish) =

- Parish
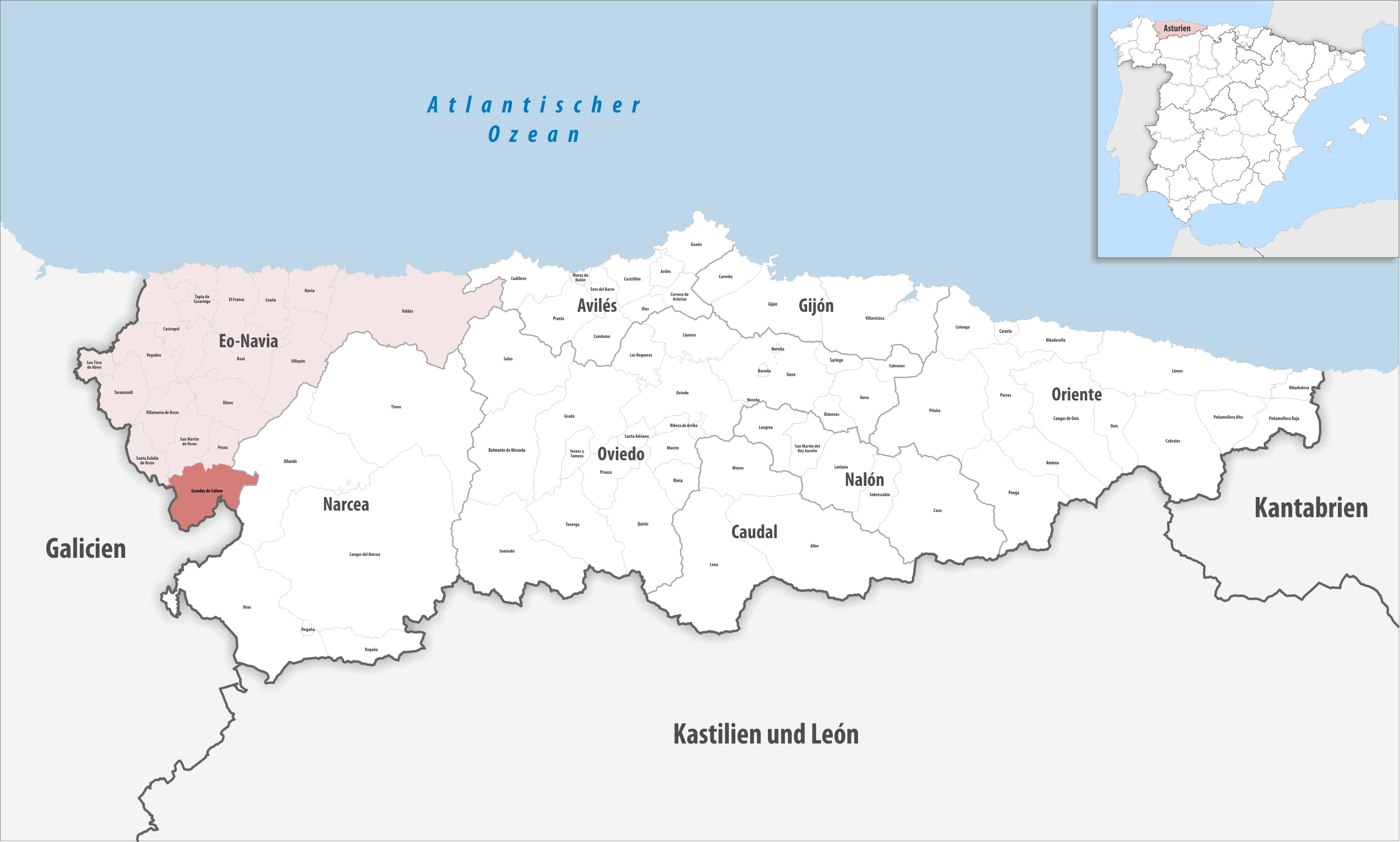

- Location within Spain
- Country: Spain
- Autonomous community: Asturias
- Province: Asturias
- Municipality: Grandas de Salime

Grandas de Salime is the capital city, and one of seven parishes (administrative divisions) in the municipality of Grandas de Salime, within the province and autonomous community of Asturias, in northern Spain.

The population is 889 (INE 2006).

== Villages and hamlets ==
- A Farrapa
- A Reigada
- Busmayor
- Carballo del Cuito
- Carballofalso
- Castiadelo
- Castro
- Cerexeira
- El Fabal
- El Salto
- Escanlares
- Grandas de Salime
- Llandecarballo
- Malneira
- Nogueiróu
- Padraira
- Paradela
- Pedre
- Robledo
- Salime
- Samayor
- San Julián
- Santa María
- Tresmonte da Buliqueira
- Valdedo
- Vilabolle
- Vilarello
- Villarmayor
