= 1999 Spanish local elections in Asturias =

This article presents the results breakdown of the local elections held in Asturias on 13 June 1999. The following tables show detailed results in the autonomous community's most populous municipalities, sorted alphabetically.

== City control ==
The following table lists party control in the most populous municipalities, including provincial capitals (highlighted in bold). Gains for a party are highlighted in that party's colour.

Municipality	Population	Previous control	New control
Avilés	84,835	People's Party (PP)	Spanish Socialist Workers' Party (PSOE)
Gijón	265,491	Spanish Socialist Workers' Party (PSOE)	Spanish Socialist Workers' Party (PSOE)
Langreo	50,001	United Left (IU)	Spanish Socialist Workers' Party (PSOE)
Mieres	50,760	Spanish Socialist Workers' Party (PSOE)	Spanish Socialist Workers' Party (PSOE)
**Oviedo**	199,549	People's Party (PP)	People's Party (PP)
San Martín del Rey Aurelio	21,758	Spanish Socialist Workers' Party (PSOE)	Spanish Socialist Workers' Party (PSOE)
Siero	46,664	People's Party (PP)	Spanish Socialist Workers' Party (PSOE)

== Municipalities ==
=== Avilés ===
Population: 84,835

← Summary of the 13 June 1999 City Council of Avilés election results →
Parties and alliances	Popular vote			Seats	
Parties and alliances	Votes	%	±pp	Total	+/−
Spanish Socialist Workers' Party (PSOE)	18,696	41.97	+9.05	**12**	+3
People's Party (PP)	13,285	29.82	−8.20	**8**	−3
United Left of Asturias (IU)	6,027	13.53	−5.12	**4**	−1
Asturian Renewal Union (URAS)	2,512	5.64	New	**1**	+1
Asturianist Party (PAS)	1,936	4.35	+0.03	0	±0
The Greens of Asturias (LV)	468	1.05	−0.36	0	±0
Asturian Left Bloc (BIA)	210	0.47	New	0	±0
Andecha Astur (AA)	129	0.29	−0.15	0	±0
Blank ballots	1,285	2.88	+1.46		
**Total**	**44,548**			**25**	**±0**
Valid votes	44,548	99.41	−0.17		
Invalid votes	264	0.59	+0.17		
**Votes cast / turnout**	**44,812**	**61.02**	**−8.02**		
Abstentions	28,627	38.98	+8.02		
**Registered voters**	**73,439**				

=== Gijón ===
Population: 265,491

← Summary of the 13 June 1999 City Council of Gijón election results →
Parties and alliances	Popular vote			Seats	
Parties and alliances	Votes	%	±pp	Total	+/−
Spanish Socialist Workers' Party (PSOE)	73,400	50.52	+10.30	**16**	+4
People's Party (PP)	43,855	30.19	−8.35	**9**	−2
United Left of Asturias (IU)	13,478	9.28	−3.62	**2**	−2
Asturian Renewal Union (URAS)	4,971	3.42	New	0	±0
Asturianist Party (PAS)	3,745	2.58	+0.48	0	±0
The Greens–Gijonese Unity (LV–UGJ)^{1}	1,910	1.31	−1.89	0	±0
Asturian Left Bloc (BIA)	504	0.35	New	0	±0
Andecha Astur (AA)	427	0.29	+0.06	0	±0
Centrist Union–Democratic and Social Centre (UC–CDS)	410	0.28	−1.13	0	±0
The Phalanx (FE)	160	0.11	New	0	±0
Blank ballots	2,415	1.66	+0.80		
**Total**	**145,275**			**27**	**±0**
Valid votes	145,275	99.54	−0.05		
Invalid votes	667	0.46	+0.05		
**Votes cast / turnout**	**145,942**	**62.30**	**−5.63**		
Abstentions	88,301	37.70	+5.63		
**Registered voters**	**234,243**				
Sources
Footnotes: ^{1} The Greens–Gijonese Unity results are compared to the combined totals of Gijonese Unity and The Greens of Asturias in the 1995 election.

=== Langreo ===
Population: 50,001

← Summary of the 13 June 1999 City Council of Langreo election results →
Parties and alliances	Popular vote			Seats	
Parties and alliances	Votes	%	±pp	Total	+/−
United Left of Asturias (IU)	10,733	40.31	+5.25	**11**	+1
Spanish Socialist Workers' Party (PSOE)	9,007	33.83	+2.81	**9**	+1
People's Party (PP)	5,095	19.14	−8.62	**5**	−2
Asturianist Party (PAS)	466	1.75	−0.21	0	±0
Asturian Renewal Union (URAS)	414	1.55	New	0	±0
Asturian Left Bloc (BIA)	375	1.41	New	0	±0
Andecha Astur (AA)	45	0.17	−0.56	0	±0
Blank ballots	490	1.84	+0.84		
**Total**	**26,625**			**25**	**±0**
Valid votes	26,625	99.20	−0.01		
Invalid votes	216	0.80	+0.01		
**Votes cast / turnout**	**26,841**	**60.55**	**−6.55**		
Abstentions	17,490	39.45	+6.55		
**Registered voters**	**44,331**				
Sources
Footnotes: ^{1} The Greens–Gijonese Unity results are compared to the combined totals of Gijonese Unity and The Greens of Asturias in the 1995 election.

=== Mieres ===
Population: 50,760

← Summary of the 13 June 1999 City Council of Mieres election results →
Parties and alliances	Popular vote			Seats	
Parties and alliances	Votes	%	±pp	Total	+/−
Spanish Socialist Workers' Party (PSOE)	11,266	42.00	+7.30	**11**	+2
United Left of Asturias (IU)	6,835	25.48	−6.28	**7**	−2
People's Party (PP)	6,634	24.73	−1.89	**7**	±0
Asturian Renewal Union (URAS)	812	3.03	New	0	±0
Asturianist Party (PAS)	386	1.44	−0.43	0	±0
The Greens of Asturias (LV)	189	0.70	+0.06	0	±0
Andecha Astur (AA)	119	0.44	New	0	±0
Asturian Left Bloc (BIA)^{1}	112	0.42	+0.11	0	±0
Blank ballots	469	1.75	+0.83		
**Total**	**26,822**			**25**	**±0**
Valid votes	26,822	99.28	+0.26		
Invalid votes	194	0.72	−0.26		
**Votes cast / turnout**	**27,016**	**61.18**	**−7.94**		
Abstentions	17,145	38.82	+7.94		
**Registered voters**	**44,161**				
Sources
Footnotes: ^{1} Asturian Left Bloc results are compared to Communist Party of the Peoples of Spain totals in the 1995 election.

=== Oviedo ===
Population: 199,549

← Summary of the 13 June 1999 City Council of Oviedo election results →
Parties and alliances	Popular vote			Seats	
Parties and alliances	Votes	%	±pp	Total	+/−
People's Party (PP)	55,259	47.76	−14.39	**15**	−3
Spanish Socialist Workers' Party (PSOE)	38,955	33.67	+12.70	**10**	+4
United Left of Asturias (IU)	10,941	9.46	−2.14	**2**	−1
Asturian Renewal Union (URAS)	3,032	2.62	New	0	±0
Asturianist Party (PAS)	2,204	1.90	+0.44	0	±0
The Greens of Asturias (LV)	896	0.77	+0.20	0	±0
Andecha Astur (AA)	547	0.47	+0.17	0	±0
Centrist Union–Democratic and Social Centre (UC–CDS)	474	0.41	−0.68	0	±0
The Phalanx (FE)	133	0.11	New	0	±0
Humanist Party (PH)	70	0.06	New	0	±0
Blank ballots	3,200	2.77	+1.27		
**Total**	**115,711**			**27**	**±0**
Valid votes	115,711	99.40	−0.09		
Invalid votes	703	0.60	+0.09		
**Votes cast / turnout**	**116,414**	**64.69**	**−4.25**		
Abstentions	63,529	35.31	+4.25		
**Registered voters**	**179,943**				

=== San Martín del Rey Aurelio ===
Population: 21,758

← Summary of the 13 June 1999 City Council of San Martín del Rey Aurelio election results →
Parties and alliances	Popular vote			Seats	
Parties and alliances	Votes	%	±pp	Total	+/−
Spanish Socialist Workers' Party (PSOE)	6,667	51.21	+3.40	**12**	+1
United Left of Asturias (IU)	2,470	18.97	−2.25	**4**	±0
People's Party (PP)	2,315	17.78	−7.70	**4**	−2
Asturian Renewal Union (URAS)	703	5.40	New	**1**	+1
Asturianist Party (PAS)	492	3.78	+1.02	0	±0
Asturian Left Bloc (BIA)	144	1.11	New	0	±0
Andecha Astur (AA)	26	0.20	−0.49	0	±0
Blank ballots	203	1.56	+0.68		
**Total**	**13,020**			**21**	**±0**
Valid votes	13,020	99.03	−0.10		
Invalid votes	128	0.97	+0.10		
**Votes cast / turnout**	**13,148**	**67.30**	**−8.44**		
Abstentions	6,388	32.70	+8.44		
**Registered voters**	**19,536**				

=== Siero ===
Population: 46,664

← Summary of the 13 June 1999 City Council of Siero election results →
Parties and alliances	Popular vote			Seats	
Parties and alliances	Votes	%	±pp	Total	+/−
People's Party (PP)	10,176	41.31	+2.31	**10**	±0
Spanish Socialist Workers' Party (PSOE)	8,130	33.00	+6.14	**8**	+2
United Left of Asturias (IU)	2,396	9.73	−5.62	**2**	−1
Asturian Council (Conceyu)	1,764	7.16	−3.65	**1**	−1
Asturianist Party (PAS)	734	2.98	+0.18	0	±0
Asturian Renewal Union (URAS)	513	2.08	New	0	±0
The Greens of Asturias (LV)	230	0.93	−0.53	0	±0
Andecha Astur (AA)	166	0.67	New	0	±0
Blank ballots	527	2.14	+0.94		
**Total**	**24,636**			**21**	**±0**
Valid votes	24,636	99.09	+0.18		
Invalid votes	225	0.91	−0.18		
**Votes cast / turnout**	**24,861**	**61.81**	**−4.78**		
Abstentions	15,358	38.19	+4.78		
**Registered voters**	**40,219**				

== See also ==
- 1999 Asturian regional election
