= 2003 Spanish local elections in Asturias =

This article presents the results breakdown of the local elections held in Asturias on 25 May 2003. The following tables show detailed results in the autonomous community's most populous municipalities, sorted alphabetically.

== City control ==
The following table lists party control in the most populous municipalities, including provincial capitals (highlighted in bold). Gains for a party are highlighted in that party's colour.

Municipality	Population	Previous control	New control
Avilés	83,511	Spanish Socialist Workers' Party (PSOE)	Spanish Socialist Workers' Party (PSOE)
Gijón	270,211	Spanish Socialist Workers' Party (PSOE)	Spanish Socialist Workers' Party (PSOE)
Langreo	47,796	Spanish Socialist Workers' Party (PSOE)	Spanish Socialist Workers' Party (PSOE)
Mieres	48,418	Spanish Socialist Workers' Party (PSOE)	Spanish Socialist Workers' Party (PSOE)
**Oviedo**	202,938	People's Party (PP)	People's Party (PP)
San Martín del Rey Aurelio	20,186	Spanish Socialist Workers' Party (PSOE)	Spanish Socialist Workers' Party (PSOE)
Siero	48,569	Spanish Socialist Workers' Party (PSOE)	Spanish Socialist Workers' Party (PSOE)

== Municipalities ==
=== Avilés ===
Population: 83,511

← Summary of the 25 May 2003 City Council of Avilés election results →
Parties and alliances	Popular vote			Seats	
Parties and alliances	Votes	%	±pp	Total	+/−
People's Party (PP)	16,317	36.44	+6.62	10	+2
Spanish Socialist Workers' Party (PSOE)	15,944	35.61	−6.36	10	−2
United Left–Bloc for Asturias (IU–BA)	6,200	13.85	+0.32	4	±0
Independent Social Group of Avilés (ASIA)	2,387	5.33	New	1	+1
Asturianist Party (PAS)	863	1.93	−2.42	0	±0
Asturian Renewal Union (URAS)	811	1.81	−3.83	0	−1
The Greens–Avilés Citizen Initiative (LV–ICA)	667	1.49	+0.44	0	±0
Andecha Astur (AA)	357	0.80	+0.51	0	±0
Communist Party of the Peoples of Spain (PCPE)^{1}	100	0.22	−0.27	0	±0
Blank ballots	1,126	2.51	−0.37		
Total	44,772			25	±0
Valid votes	44,772	99.36	−0.05		
Invalid votes	289	0.64	+0.05		
Votes cast / turnout	45,061	61.21	+0.19		
Abstentions	28,551	38.79	−0.19		
Registered voters	73,612				
Sources
Footnotes: ^{1} Communist Party of the Peoples of Spain results are compared to Asturian Left Bloc totals in the 1999 election.

=== Gijón ===
Population: 270,211

← Summary of the 25 May 2003 City Council of Gijón election results →
Parties and alliances	Popular vote			Seats	
Parties and alliances	Votes	%	±pp	Total	+/−
Spanish Socialist Workers' Party (PSOE)	65,960	45.29	−5.23	13	−3
People's Party (PP)	52,402	35.98	+5.79	11	+2
United Left–Bloc for Asturias (IU–BA)	14,431	9.91	+0.63	3	+1
Asturianist Party (PAS)	3,478	2.39	−0.19	0	±0
Asturian Renewal Union (URAS)	2,682	1.84	−1.58	0	±0
The Greens–Green Left of Asturias (LV–IVA)	2,006	1.38	+0.07	0	±0
Andecha Astur (AA)	583	0.40	+0.11	0	±0
Communist Party of the Peoples of Spain (PCPE)^{1}	396	0.27	−0.08	0	±0
Senior Defense Platform (PlaDeTE)	269	0.18	New	0	±0
Democratic and Social Centre (CDS)	250	0.17	−0.11	0	±0
Blank ballots	3,181	2.18	+0.52		
Total	145,638			27	±0
Valid votes	145,638	99.56	+0.02		
Invalid votes	648	0.44	−0.02		
Votes cast / turnout	146,286	60.34	−1.96		
Abstentions	96,169	39.66	+1.96		
Registered voters	242,455				
Sources
Footnotes: ^{1} Communist Party of the Peoples of Spain results are compared to Asturian Left Bloc totals in the 1999 election.

=== Langreo ===
Population: 47,796

← Summary of the 25 May 2003 City Council of Langreo election results →
Parties and alliances	Popular vote			Seats	
Parties and alliances	Votes	%	±pp	Total	+/−
Spanish Socialist Workers' Party (PSOE)	8,811	35.65	+1.82	8	−1
United Left–Bloc for Asturias (IU–BA)	7,587	30.70	−9.61	7	−4
People's Party (PP)	6,678	27.02	+7.88	6	+1
Asturian Renewal Union (URAS)	353	1.43	−0.12	0	±0
Asturianist Party (PAS)	345	1.40	−0.35	0	±0
The Greens–Green Left of Asturias (LV–IVA)	185	0.75	New	0	±0
Communist Party of the Peoples of Spain (PCPE)^{1}	89	0.36	−1.05	0	±0
Andecha Astur (AA)	88	0.36	+0.19	0	±0
Blank ballots	581	2.35	+0.51		
Total	24,717			21	−4
Valid votes	24,717	99.18	−0.02		
Invalid votes	204	0.82	+0.02		
Votes cast / turnout	24,921	57.71	−2.84		
Abstentions	18,262	42.29	+2.84		
Registered voters	43,183				
Sources
Footnotes: ^{1} Communist Party of the Peoples of Spain results are compared to Asturian Left Bloc totals in the 1999 election.

=== Mieres ===
Population: 48,418

← Summary of the 25 May 2003 City Council of Mieres election results →
Parties and alliances	Popular vote			Seats	
Parties and alliances	Votes	%	±pp	Total	+/−
Spanish Socialist Workers' Party (PSOE)	9,151	36.15	−5.85	8	−3
People's Party (PP)	7,823	30.91	+6.18	7	±0
United Left–Bloc for Asturias (IU–BA)	6,388	25.24	−0.24	6	−1
Asturian Left–The Greens (IAS–LV)^{1}	344	1.36	+0.66	0	±0
Asturianist Party (PAS)	258	1.02	−0.42	0	±0
Asturian Renewal Union (URAS)	208	0.82	−2.21	0	±0
Communist Party of the Peoples of Spain (PCPE)^{2}	163	0.64	+0.22	0	±0
Andecha Astur (AA)	135	0.53	+0.09	0	±0
Blank ballots	842	3.33	+1.58		
Total	25,312			21	−4
Valid votes	25,312	98.99	−0.29		
Invalid votes	257	1.01	+0.29		
Votes cast / turnout	25,569	59.50	−1.68		
Abstentions	17,404	40.50	+1.68		
Registered voters	42,973				
Sources
Footnotes: ^{1} Asturian Left–The Greens results are compared to The Greens of Asturias totals in the 1999 election.; ^{2} Communist Party of the Peoples of Spain results are compared to Asturian Left Bloc totals in the 1999 election.

=== Oviedo ===
Population: 202,938

← Summary of the 25 May 2003 City Council of Oviedo election results →
Parties and alliances	Popular vote			Seats	
Parties and alliances	Votes	%	±pp	Total	+/−
People's Party (PP)	64,930	55.99	+8.23	17	+2
Spanish Socialist Workers' Party (PSOE)	32,028	27.62	−6.05	8	−2
United Left–Bloc for Asturias (IU–BA)	11,270	9.72	+0.26	2	±0
The Greens–Green Left of Asturias (LV–IVA)	1,658	1.43	+0.66	0	±0
Asturian Renewal Union (URAS)	986	0.85	−1.77	0	±0
Asturianist Party (PAS)	936	0.81	−1.09	0	±0
Andecha Astur (AA)	655	0.56	+0.09	0	±0
Senior Defense Platform (PlaDeTE)	189	0.16	New	0	±0
Communist Party of the Peoples of Spain (PCPE)	153	0.13	New	0	±0
Another Democracy is Possible (ODeP)	97	0.08	New	0	±0
Humanist Party (PH)	92	0.08	+0.02	0	±0
Blank ballots	2,968	2.56	−0.21		
Total	115,962			27	±0
Valid votes	115,962	99.52	+0.12		
Invalid votes	563	0.48	−0.12		
Votes cast / turnout	116,525	63.73	−0.96		
Abstentions	66,311	36.27	+0.96		
Registered voters	182,836				

=== San Martín del Rey Aurelio ===
Population: 20,186

← Summary of the 25 May 2003 City Council of San Martín del Rey Aurelio election results →
Parties and alliances	Popular vote			Seats	
Parties and alliances	Votes	%	±pp	Total	+/−
Spanish Socialist Workers' Party (PSOE)	5,907	48.63	−2.58	11	−1
People's Party (PP)	3,036	24.99	+7.21	6	+2
United Left–Bloc for Asturias (IU–BA)	2,381	19.60	+0.63	4	±0
Asturian Renewal Union (URAS)	383	3.15	−1.25	0	−1
Asturianist Party (PAS)	130	1.07	−2.71	0	±0
Andecha Astur (AA)	61	0.50	+0.30	0	±0
Communist Party of the Peoples of Spain (PCPE)^{1}	24	0.20	−0.91	0	±0
Blank ballots	226	1.86	+0.30		
Total	12,148			21	±0
Valid votes	12,148	98.86	−0.17		
Invalid votes	140	1.14	+0.17		
Votes cast / turnout	12,288	65.60	−1.70		
Abstentions	6,443	34.40	+1.70		
Registered voters	18,731				
Sources
Footnotes: ^{1} Communist Party of the Peoples of Spain results are compared to Asturian Left Bloc totals in the 1999 election.

=== Siero ===
Population: 48,569

← Summary of the 25 May 2003 City Council of Siero election results →
Parties and alliances	Popular vote			Seats	
Parties and alliances	Votes	%	±pp	Total	+/−
People's Party (PP)	10,460	40.61	−0.70	10	±0
Spanish Socialist Workers' Party (PSOE)	8,728	33.89	+0.89	8	±0
United Left–Bloc for Asturias (IU–BA)	2,588	10.05	+0.32	2	±0
Asturian Council (Conceyu)	1,438	5.58	−1.58	1	±0
The Greens–Green Left of Asturias (LV–IVA)	925	3.59	+2.66	0	±0
Asturian Renewal Union (URAS)	386	1.50	−0.58	0	±0
Asturianist Party (PAS)	346	1.34	−1.64	0	±0
Andecha Astur (AA)	260	1.01	+0.34	0	±0
Blank ballots	626	2.43	+0.29		
Total	25,757			21	±0
Valid votes	25,757	99.19	+0.10		
Invalid votes	211	0.81	−0.10		
Votes cast / turnout	25,968	62.06	+0.25		
Abstentions	15,876	37.94	−0.25		
Registered voters	41,844				

== See also ==
- 2003 Asturian regional election
