= Western District (General Junta of Asturias constituency) =

- General Junta of the Principality of Asturias; Electoral constituency
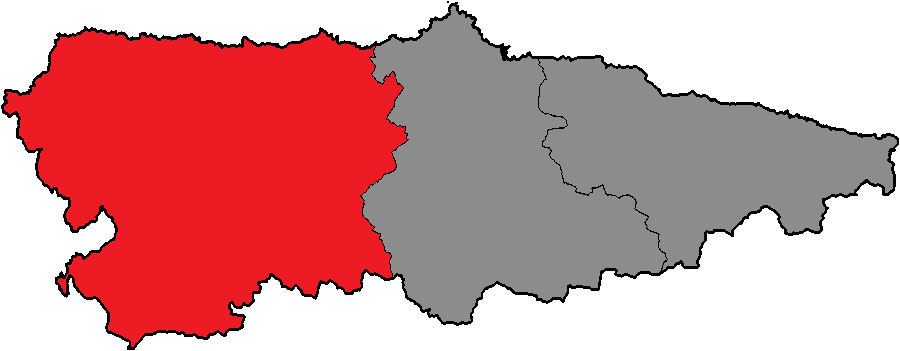
- Location of the Western District within Asturias
- Province: Asturias
- Autonomous community: Principality of Asturias
- Population: 105,863 (2019)
- Electorate: 115,005 (2023)

Current constituency
- Created: 1983
- Seats: 8 (1983–1995); 7 (1995–2007); 6 (2007–present)
- Members: PSOE (3); PP (3)

Western District is one of the three constituencies (Spanish: circunscripciones) represented in the General Junta of the Principality of Asturias, the regional legislature of the Principality of Asturias. The constituency currently elects six deputies. It comprises the municipalities of Allande, Belmonte de Miranda, Boal, Candamo, Cangas del Narcea, Castropol, Coaña, Cudillero, Degaña, El Franco, Grado, Grandas de Salime, Ibias, Illano, Muros del Nalón, Navia, Pesoz, Pravia, Salas, San Martín de Oscos, Santa Eulalia de Oscos, San Tirso de Abres, Somiedo, Tapia de Casariego, Taramundi, Teverga, Tineo, Valdés, Vegadeo, Villanueva de Oscos, Villayón and Yernes y Tameza. The electoral system uses the D'Hondt method and closed-list proportional representation, with a minimum threshold of 3%.

== Electoral system ==
The constituency was created as per the Statute of Autonomy for Asturias of 1981 and was first contested in the 1983 regional election. The Statute provided for sub-provincial divisions of the Principality's territory to be established as multi-member districts in the General Junta of the Principality of Asturias, with this regulation being maintained under the 1986 regional electoral law. Each constituency is entitled to an initial minimum of two seats, with the remaining 39 being distributed in proportion to their populations. The exception was the 1983 election, when each constituency was allocated a fixed number of seats: 32 for the Central District, 5 for the Eastern District and 8 for the Western District.

Voting is on the basis of universal suffrage, which comprises all nationals over eighteen, registered in Asturias and in full enjoyment of their political rights. Amendments to the electoral law in 2011 required for Asturians abroad to apply for voting before being permitted to vote, a system known as "begged" or expat vote (Spanish: Voto rogado) which was abolished in 2022. Seats are elected using the D'Hondt method and a closed list proportional representation, with a threshold of three percent of valid votes—which includes blank ballots—being applied in each constituency. The only exception was in 1983, when a five percent threshold was applied regionally. Parties not reaching the threshold are not taken into consideration for seat distribution. The use of the D'Hondt method might result in a higher effective threshold, depending on the district magnitude.

The electoral law allows for parties and federations registered in the interior ministry, coalitions and groupings of electors to present lists of candidates. Parties and federations intending to form a coalition ahead of an election are required to inform the relevant Electoral Commission within ten days of the election call—fifteen before 1985—whereas groupings of electors need to secure the signature of at least one percent of the electorate in the constituencies for which they seek election—one-thousandth of the electorate, with a compulsory minimum of 500 signatures, until 1985—disallowing electors from signing for more than one list of candidates.

== Deputies ==
Deputies 1983–present
Key to parties PCA–PCE Podemos PSOE CDS URAS PP CP AP FAC
Junta	Election	Distribution
1st	1983	1 / 4 / 3
2nd	1987	4 / 1 / 3
3rd	1991	5 / 3
4th	1995	4 / 3
5th	1999	4 / 1 / 2
6th	2003	4 / 3
7th	2007	3 / 3
8th	2011	2 / 2 / 2
9th	2012	3 / 2 / 1
10th	2015	1 / 3 / 2
11th	2019	4 / 2
12th	2023	3 / 3

== Regional elections ==
=== 2023 ===
Summary of the 28 May 2023 General Junta of Asturias election results in the Western District
Parties and alliances	Popular vote			Seats	
Parties and alliances	Votes	%	±pp	Total	+/−
Spanish Socialist Workers' Party (PSOE)	22,482	37.05	–4.41	3	–1
People's Party (PP)	21,236	34.99	+10.25	3	+1
Asturias Forum (Foro)	4,049	6.67	+1.49	0	±0
Vox (Vox)	3,950	6.51	+2.13	0	±0
Assembly for Asturias United Left–More Country–Asturian Left (IU–MP–IAS)^{1}	3,278	5.40	+0.45	0	±0
SOS Asturias–Empty Spain (SOS Asturias)	2,574	4.24	New	0	±0
We Can Asturias (Podemos Asturies)	1,063	1.75	–5.83	0	±0
Citizens–Party of the Citizenry (CS)	315	0.52	–8.95	0	±0
Animalist Party with the Environment (PACMA)	281	0.46	New	0	±0
Communist Party of the Workers of Spain (PCTE)	126	0.21	+0.03	0	±0
Unite Principality (SMP)	93	0.15	New	0	±0
Andecha Astur (Andecha)	79	0.13	–0.05	0	±0
For a Fairer World (PUM+J)	44	0.07	New	0	±0
Blank ballots	1,113	1.83	+0.27		
Total	60,683			6	±0
Valid votes	60,683	98.43	+0.05		
Invalid votes	969	1.57	–0.05		
Votes cast / turnout	61,652	53.61	+1.32		
Abstentions	53,353	46.39	–1.32		
Registered voters	115,005				
Sources
Footnotes: ^{1} Assembly for Asturias United Left–More Country–Asturian Left results are compared to United Left–Asturian Left: Asturias by the Left totals in the 2019 election.

=== 2019 ===
Summary of the 26 May 2019 General Junta of Asturias election results in the Western District
Parties and alliances	Popular vote			Seats	
Parties and alliances	Votes	%	±pp	Total	+/−
Spanish Socialist Workers' Party (PSOE)	25,228	41.46	+5.99	4	+1
People's Party (PP)	15,052	24.74	–1.83	2	±0
Citizens–Party of the Citizenry (Cs)	5,761	9.47	+6.20	0	±0
We Can Asturias (Podemos Asturies)	4,612	7.58	–6.61	0	–1
Forum of Citizens (FAC)	3,150	5.18	–3.15	0	±0
United Left–Asturian Left: Asturias by the Left (IU–IAS)	3,012	4.95	–2.75	0	±0
Vox (Vox)	2,668	4.38	+4.38	0	±0
Greens–Equo (V–Q)	202	0.33	+0.16	0	±0
Andecha Astur (Andecha)	109	0.18	+0.10	0	±0
Communist Party of the Workers of Spain (PCTE)	108	0.18	New	0	±0
Blank ballots	948	1.56	–0.80		
Total	60,850			6	±0
Valid votes	60,850	98.38	+0.45		
Invalid votes	1,003	1.62	–0.45		
Votes cast / turnout	61,853	52.29	+0.24		
Abstentions	56,437	47.71	–0.24		
Registered voters	118,290				

=== 2015 ===
Summary of the 24 May 2015 General Junta of Asturias election results in the Western District
Parties and alliances	Popular vote			Seats	
Parties and alliances	Votes	%	±pp	Total	+/−
Spanish Socialist Workers' Party (PSOE)	22,216	35.47	–0.33	3	±0
People's Party (PP)	16,643	26.57	+0.24	2	±0
We Can (Podemos)	8,889	14.19	New	1	+1
Forum of Citizens (FAC)	5,220	8.33	–15.48	0	–1
United Left of Asturias (IU/IX)	4,821	7.70	–1.59	0	±0
Citizens–Party of the Citizenry (C's)	2,049	3.27	New	0	±0
Animalist Party Against Mistreatment of Animals (PACMA)	255	0.41	+0.23	0	±0
Asturian Renewal Union (URAS)	249	0.40	+0.02	0	±0
Union, Progress and Democracy (UPyD)	231	0.37	–1.32	0	±0
Blank Seats (EB)	224	0.36	±0.00	0	±0
Communist Party of the Peoples of Spain (PCPE)	119	0.19	+0.08	0	±0
Equo (Equo)	109	0.17	–0.15	0	±0
Andecha Astur (Andecha)	48	0.08	+0.02	0	±0
Zero Cuts (Recortes Cero)	41	0.07	New	0	±0
Humanist Party (PH)	28	0.04	+0.02	0	±0
Republican Social Movement (MSR)	15	0.02	+0.01	0	±0
Vox (Vox)	0	0.00	New	0	±0
Citizens' Democratic Renewal Movement (RED)	0	0.00	New	0	±0
Spanish Phalanx of the CNSO (FE–JONS)	0	0.00	New	0	±0
Blank ballots	1,477	2.36	+0.99		
Total	62,634			6	±0
Valid votes	62,634	97.93	–0.92		
Invalid votes	1,323	2.07	+0.92		
Votes cast / turnout	63,957	52.05	+6.28		
Abstentions	58,923	47.95	–6.28		
Registered voters	122,880				

=== 2012 ===
Summary of the 25 March 2012 General Junta of Asturias election results in the Western District
Parties and alliances	Popular vote			Seats	
Parties and alliances	Votes	%	±pp	Total	+/−
Spanish Socialist Workers' Party (PSOE)	20,106	35.80	–0.78	3	+1
People's Party (PP)	14,787	26.33	+1.27	2	±0
Forum of Citizens (FAC)	13,369	23.81	–0.78	1	–1
United Left of Asturias (IU/IX)	5,219	9.29	+1.48	0	±0
Union, Progress and Democracy (UPyD)	948	1.69	+0.91	0	±0
Asturian Renewal Union (URAS)^{1}	214	0.38	–0.07	0	±0
Blank Seats (EB)	200	0.36	New	0	±0
Equo–The Greens of Asturias (Equo–LV)	181	0.32	New	0	±0
Animalist Party Against Mistreatment of Animals (PACMA)	101	0.18	–0.03	0	±0
Commitment for Asturias (BA–UNA–LV–GV)^{2}	67	0.12	–0.67	0	±0
Communist Party of the Peoples of Spain (PCPE)	59	0.11	–0.04	0	±0
Independents of Asturias–Hartos.org (IDEAS–Hartos.org)	35	0.06	–0.59	0	±0
Andecha Astur (Andecha)	34	0.06	New	0	±0
Democratic and Constitutional Party (PDyC)	25	0.04	–0.18	0	±0
Land Party (PT)	16	0.03	New	0	±0
Humanist Party (PH)	14	0.02	New	0	±0
Communist Unification of Spain (UCE)	9	0.02	New	0	±0
Republican Social Movement (MSR)	5	0.01	New	0	±0
Internationalist Solidarity and Self-Management (SAIn)	0	0.00	New	0	±0
Blank ballots	769	1.37	–0.87		
Total	56,158			6	±0
Valid votes	56,158	98.85	+0.21		
Invalid votes	653	1.15	–0.21		
Votes cast / turnout	56,811	45.77	–15.71		
Abstentions	67,322	54.23	+15.71		
Registered voters	124,133				
Sources
Footnotes: ^{1} Asturian Renewal Union results are compared to Asturian Renewal Union–Asturianist Party totals in the 2011 election.; ^{2} Commitment for Asturias results are compared to the combined totals of Bloc for Asturias–Asturian Nationalist Unity: Commitment for Asturias and The Greens–Green Group in the 2011 election.

=== 2011 ===
Summary of the 22 May 2011 General Junta of Asturias election results in the Western District
Parties and alliances	Popular vote			Seats	
Parties and alliances	Votes	%	±pp	Total	+/−
Spanish Socialist Workers' Party (PSOE)	27,499	36.58	–13.67	2	–1
People's Party (PP)	18,837	25.06	–13.16	2	–1
Forum of Citizens (FAC)	18,484	24.59	New	2	+2
United Left of Asturias–The Greens (IU–LV)	5,868	7.81	+0.90	0	±0
Union, Progress and Democracy (UPyD)	587	0.78	New	0	±0
Independents of Asturias (IDEAS)	489	0.65	New	0	±0
Asturian Renewal Union–Asturianist Party (URAS–PAS)	337	0.45	–0.83	0	±0
Bloc for Asturias–Asturian Nationalist Unity: Commitment for Asturias (BA–UNA)	327	0.44	New	0	±0
The Greens–Green Group (LV–GV)	262	0.35	New	0	±0
Left Front (FDLI)	194	0.26	New	0	±0
Constitutional and Democratic Party (PDyC)	167	0.22	New	0	±0
Anti-Bullfighting Party Against Mistreatment of Animals (PACMA)	160	0.21	New	0	±0
Communist Party of the Peoples of Spain (PCPE)	111	0.15	–0.04	0	±0
Open Council (Conceyu Abiertu)	75	0.10	New	0	±0
National Democracy (DN)	47	0.06	–0.11	0	±0
Liberal and Social Alternative (ALS)	42	0.06	New	0	±0
Blank ballots	1,682	2.24	+0.42		
Total	75,168			6	±0
Valid votes	75,168	98.64	–0.38		
Invalid votes	1,034	1.36	+0.38		
Votes cast / turnout	76,202	61.48	–3.41		
Abstentions	47,747	38.52	+3.41		
Registered voters	123,949				

=== 2007 ===
Summary of the 27 May 2007 General Junta of Asturias election results in the Western District
Parties and alliances	Popular vote			Seats	
Parties and alliances	Votes	%	±pp	Total	+/−
Spanish Socialist Workers' Party (PSOE)	40,372	50.25	+4.71	3	–1
People's Party (PP)	30,710	38.22	–0.16	3	±0
United Left–Bloc for Asturias–The Greens of Asturias (IU–BA–LV)^{1}	5,555	6.91	–0.62	0	±0
Asturian Renewal Union–Asturianist Party (URAS–PAS)^{2}	1,030	1.28	–4.59	0	±0
Unity (Unidá)	450	0.56	New	0	±0
Andecha Astur (AA)	189	0.24	–0.16	0	±0
Republican Left (IR)	175	0.22	New	0	±0
Communist Party of the Peoples of Spain (PCPE)	152	0.19	+0.01	0	±0
National Democracy (DN)	140	0.17	New	0	±0
Asturian Council (Conceyu)	115	0.14	New	0	±0
Blank ballots	1,462	1.82	+0.07		
Total	80,350			6	–1
Valid votes	80,350	99.02	–0.07		
Invalid votes	798	0.98	+0.07		
Votes cast / turnout	81,148	64.89	–0.86		
Abstentions	43,907	35.11	+0.86		
Registered voters	125,055				
Sources
Footnotes: ^{1} United Left–Bloc for Asturias–The Greens of Asturias results are compared to the combined totals of United Left–Bloc for Asturias and The Greens–Green Left of Asturias in the 2003 election.; ^{2} Asturian Renewal Union–Asturianist Party results are compared to the combined totals of Asturian Renewal Union and Asturianist Party in the 2003 election.

=== 2003 ===
Summary of the 25 May 2003 General Junta of Asturias election results in the Western District
Parties and alliances	Popular vote			Seats	
Parties and alliances	Votes	%	±pp	Total	+/−
Spanish Socialist Workers' Party (PSOE)	38,173	45.54	+0.24	4	±0
People's Party (PP)	32,171	38.38	+5.44	3	+1
United Left–Bloc for Asturias (IU–BA)	5,912	7.05	+2.11	0	±0
Asturian Renewal Union (URAS)	4,041	4.82	–8.32	0	–1
Asturianist Party (PAS)	882	1.05	–1.51	0	±0
The Greens–Green Left of Asturias (LV–IVA)	399	0.48	+0.08	0	±0
Andecha Astur (AA)	333	0.40	+0.15	0	±0
Senior Defense Platform (PlaDeTE)	306	0.37	New	0	±0
Communist Party of the Peoples of Spain (PCPE)^{1}	147	0.18	+0.04	0	±0
Blank ballots	1,464	1.75	+0.52		
Total	83,828			7	±0
Valid votes	83,828	99.09	+0.11		
Invalid votes	771	0.91	–0.11		
Votes cast / turnout	84,599	65.75	+0.97		
Abstentions	44,061	34.25	–0.97		
Registered voters	128,660				
Sources
Footnotes: ^{1} Communist Party of the Peoples of Spain results are compared to Asturian Left Bloc totals in the 1999 election.

=== 1999 ===
Summary of the 13 June 1999 General Junta of Asturias election results in the Western District
Parties and alliances	Popular vote			Seats	
Parties and alliances	Votes	%	±pp	Total	+/−
Spanish Socialist Workers' Party (PSOE)	38,035	45.30	+1.77	4	±0
People's Party (PP)	27,660	32.94	–7.80	2	–1
Asturian Renewal Union (URAS)	11,033	13.14	New	1	+1
United Left of Asturias (IU)	4,151	4.94	–4.26	0	±0
Asturianist Party (PAS)	1,312	1.56	+0.12	0	±0
The Greens of Asturias (LV)	336	0.40	–0.01	0	±0
Andecha Astur (AA)	211	0.25	+0.11	0	±0
Asturian Left Bloc (BIA)^{1}	119	0.14	–0.05	0	±0
The Phalanx (FE)	71	0.08	New	0	±0
Blank ballots	1,035	1.23	+0.24		
Total	83,963			7	±0
Valid votes	83,963	98.98	–0.27		
Invalid votes	867	1.02	+0.27		
Votes cast / turnout	84,830	64.78	–3.10		
Abstentions	46,127	35.22	+3.10		
Registered voters	130,957				
Sources
Footnotes: ^{1} Asturian Left Bloc results are compared to Communist Party of the Peoples of Spain totals in the 1995 election.

=== 1995 ===
Summary of the 28 May 1995 General Junta of Asturias election results in the Western District
Parties and alliances	Popular vote			Seats	
Parties and alliances	Votes	%	±pp	Total	+/−
Spanish Socialist Workers' Party (PSOE)	37,066	43.53	–4.60	4	–1
People's Party (PP)	34,694	40.74	+9.46	3	±0
United Left (IU)	7,832	9.20	–0.11	0	±0
Asturian Centre–Democratic and Social Centre (CA–CDS)	2,533	2.97	–4.86	0	±0
Asturianist Party (PAS)^{1}	1,224	1.44	+0.41	0	±0
The Greens of Asturias (LV)	349	0.41	–0.38	0	±0
Asturian League (LA)	336	0.39	New	0	±0
Communist Party of the Peoples of Spain (PCPE)	164	0.19	–0.14	0	±0
Andecha Astur (AA)	118	0.14	–0.02	0	±0
Blank ballots	839	0.99	+0.15		
Total	85,155			7	–1
Valid votes	85,155	99.25	+0.05		
Invalid votes	645	0.75	–0.05		
Votes cast / turnout	85,800	67.88	+5.67		
Abstentions	40,594	32.12	–5.67		
Registered voters	126,394				
Sources
Footnotes: ^{1} Asturianist Party results are compared to Asturian Coalition totals in the 1991 election.

=== 1991 ===
Summary of the 26 May 1991 General Junta of Asturias election results in the Western District
Parties and alliances	Popular vote			Seats	
Parties and alliances	Votes	%	±pp	Total	+/−
Spanish Socialist Workers' Party (PSOE)	38,944	48.13	+2.22	5	+1
People's Party (PP)^{1}	25,308	31.28	+1.88	3	±0
United Left (IU)	7,530	9.31	+0.61	0	±0
Democratic and Social Centre (CDS)	6,335	7.83	–5.98	0	–1
Asturian Coalition (PAS–UNA)^{2}	832	1.03	+0.67	0	±0
The Greens (LV)	638	0.79	New	0	±0
Communist Party of the Peoples of Spain (PCPE)	271	0.33	New	0	±0
Andecha Astur (AA)	132	0.16	New	0	±0
Independent Council of Asturias (Conceyu)	130	0.16	New	0	±0
Gijonese Garments Workers (TGC)	130	0.16	New	0	±0
Blank ballots	670	0.83	+0.06		
Total	80,920			8	±0
Valid votes	80,920	99.20	+0.44		
Invalid votes	655	0.80	–0.44		
Votes cast / turnout	81,575	62.21	–1.43		
Abstentions	49,548	37.79	+1.43		
Registered voters	131,123				
Sources
Footnotes: ^{1} People's Party results are compared to the combined totals of People's Alliance and People's Democratic Party in the 1987 election.; ^{2} Asturian Coalition results are compared to Asturianist Party totals in the 1987 election.

=== 1987 ===
Summary of the 10 June 1987 General Junta of Asturias election results in the Western District
Parties and alliances	Popular vote			Seats	
Parties and alliances	Votes	%	±pp	Total	+/−
Spanish Socialist Workers' Party (PSOE)	37,734	45.91	+3.33	4	±0
People's Alliance (AP)^{1}	22,886	27.85	–9.36	3	±0
Democratic and Social Centre (CDS)	11,352	13.81	+7.70	1	+1
United Left (IU)^{2}	7,154	8.70	–1.74	0	–1
People's Democratic Party (PDP)	1,271	1.55	New	0	±0
Workers' Socialist Party (PST)	456	0.55	–0.35	0	±0
Asturianist Party (PAS)	298	0.36	New	0	±0
Asturian Nationalist Ensame (ENA)	212	0.26	–0.43	0	±0
Humanist Platform (PH)	195	0.24	New	0	±0
Blank ballots	632	0.77	+0.21		
Total	82,190			8	±0
Valid votes	82,190	98.76	–0.25		
Invalid votes	1,031	1.24	+0.25		
Votes cast / turnout	83,221	63.64	+6.32		
Abstentions	47,557	36.36	–6.32		
Registered voters	130,778				
Sources
Footnotes: ^{1} People's Alliance results are compared to People's Coalition totals in the 1983 election.; ^{2} United Left results are compared to Communist Party of Asturias totals in the 1983 election.

=== 1983 ===
Summary of the 8 May 1983 General Junta of Asturias election results in the Western District
Parties and alliances	Popular vote			Seats	
Parties and alliances	Votes	%	±pp	Total	+/−
Spanish Socialist Workers' Party (PSOE)	33,314	42.58	n/a	4	n/a
People's Coalition (AP–PDP–UL)	29,111	37.21	n/a	3	n/a
Communist Party of Asturias (PCA–PCE)	8,165	10.44	n/a	1	n/a
Democratic and Social Centre (CDS)	4,780	6.11	n/a	0	n/a
Workers' Socialist Party (PST)	708	0.90	n/a	0	n/a
Communist Candidacy (PRUC–PCPE)	613	0.78	n/a	0	n/a
Asturian Nationalist Ensame (ENA)	538	0.69	n/a	0	n/a
Asturian Left (MC–LCR)	368	0.47	n/a	0	n/a
Popular Struggle Coalition (CLP)	204	0.26	n/a	0	n/a
Blank ballots	439	0.56	n/a		
Total	78,240			8	n/a
Valid votes	78,240	99.01	n/a		
Invalid votes	785	0.99	n/a		
Votes cast / turnout	79,025	57.32	n/a		
Abstentions	58,853	42.68	n/a		
Registered voters	137,878				
