= 1995 Spanish local elections in Asturias =

This article presents the results breakdown of the local elections held in Asturias on 28 May 1995. The following tables show detailed results in the autonomous community's most populous municipalities, sorted alphabetically.

== City control ==
The following table lists party control in the most populous municipalities, including provincial capitals (highlighted in bold). Gains for a party are highlighted in that party's colour.

Municipality	Population	Previous control	New control
Avilés	88,570	Spanish Socialist Workers' Party (PSOE)	People's Party (PP)
Gijón	269,644	Spanish Socialist Workers' Party (PSOE)	Spanish Socialist Workers' Party (PSOE)
Langreo	52,023	Spanish Socialist Workers' Party (PSOE)	United Left (IU)
Mieres	53,331	Spanish Socialist Workers' Party (PSOE)	Spanish Socialist Workers' Party (PSOE)
**Oviedo**	201,712	People's Party (PP)	People's Party (PP)
San Martín del Rey Aurelio	23,519	Spanish Socialist Workers' Party (PSOE)	Spanish Socialist Workers' Party (PSOE)
Siero	46,232	Spanish Socialist Workers' Party (PSOE)	People's Party (PP)

== Municipalities ==
=== Avilés ===
Population: 88,570

← Summary of the 28 May 1995 City Council of Avilés election results →
Parties and alliances	Popular vote			Seats	
Parties and alliances	Votes	%	±pp	Total	+/−
People's Party (PP)	19,029	38.02	+11.56	**11**	+4
Spanish Socialist Workers' Party (PSOE)	16,479	32.92	−9.63	**9**	−3
United Left (IU)	9,333	18.65	−0.52	**5**	±0
Asturianist Party (PAS)^{1}	2,163	4.32	+0.39	0	±0
Avilesinan Independent Candidacy Group (ACIA)	731	1.46	New	0	±0
The Greens of Asturias (LV)	706	1.41	New	0	±0
Asturian Centrists (CAS)	679	1.36	−5.02	0	−1
Andecha Astur (AA)	221	0.44	New	0	±0
Blank ballots	710	1.42	−0.09		
**Total**	**50,051**			**25**	**±0**
Valid votes	50,051	99.58	+0.08		
Invalid votes	209	0.42	−0.08		
**Votes cast / turnout**	**50,260**	**69.04**	**+12.01**		
Abstentions	22,535	30.96	−12.01		
**Registered voters**	**72,795**				
Sources
Footnotes: ^{1} Asturianist Party results are compared to Asturian Coalition totals in the 1991 election.

=== Gijón ===
Population: 269,644

← Summary of the 28 May 1995 City Council of Gijón election results →
Parties and alliances	Popular vote			Seats	
Parties and alliances	Votes	%	±pp	Total	+/−
Spanish Socialist Workers' Party (PSOE)	61,596	40.22	+2.17	**12**	±0
People's Party (PP)	59,020	38.54	+12.05	**11**	+2
United Left (IU)	19,751	12.90	+1.29	**4**	+1
Gijonese Unity (UGJ)	3,814	2.49	−9.15	0	−3
Asturianist Party (PAS)^{1}	3,213	2.10	−0.41	0	±0
Asturian Centrists (CAS)	2,154	1.41	−2.96	0	±0
The Greens of Asturias (LV)	1,093	0.71	−0.85	0	±0
Citizen Initiative for Gijón (ICI)	521	0.34	New	0	±0
Andecha Astur (AA)	350	0.23	New	0	±0
Asturian League (LA)	331	0.22	New	0	±0
Blank ballots	1,314	0.86	−0.05		
**Total**	**153,157**			**27**	**±0**
Valid votes	153,157	99.59	+0.19		
Invalid votes	627	0.41	−0.19		
**Votes cast / turnout**	**153,784**	**67.93**	**+14.90**		
Abstentions	72,588	32.07	−14.90		
**Registered voters**	**226,372**				
Sources
Footnotes: ^{1} Asturianist Party results are compared to Asturian Coalition totals in the 1991 election.

=== Langreo ===
Population: 52,023

← Summary of the 28 May 1995 City Council of Langreo election results →
Parties and alliances	Popular vote			Seats	
Parties and alliances	Votes	%	±pp	Total	+/−
United Left (IU)	10,362	35.06	+2.68	**10**	+1
Spanish Socialist Workers' Party (PSOE)	9,168	31.02	−9.00	**8**	−3
People's Party (PP)	8,205	27.76	+10.29	**7**	+3
Asturian Centrists (CAS)	618	2.09	−4.37	0	−1
Asturianist Party (PAS)^{1}	580	1.96	±0.00	0	±0
Andecha Astur (AA)	217	0.73	New	0	±0
The Greens of Asturias (LV)	107	0.36	New	0	±0
Blank ballots	296	1.00	−0.09		
**Total**	**29,553**			**25**	**±0**
Valid votes	29,553	99.21	−0.06		
Invalid votes	235	0.79	+0.06		
**Votes cast / turnout**	**29,788**	**67.10**	**+10.59**		
Abstentions	14,605	32.90	−10.59		
**Registered voters**	**44,393**				
Sources
Footnotes: ^{1} Asturianist Party results are compared to Asturian Coalition totals in the 1991 election.

=== Mieres ===
Population: 53,331

← Summary of the 28 May 1995 City Council of Mieres election results →
Parties and alliances	Popular vote			Seats	
Parties and alliances	Votes	%	±pp	Total	+/−
Spanish Socialist Workers' Party (PSOE)	10,439	34.70	−3.60	**9**	−2
United Left (IU)	9,555	31.76	+9.61	**9**	+3
People's Party (PP)	8,008	26.62	+9.20	**7**	+2
Asturian League (LA)	639	2.12	New	0	±0
Asturianist Party (PAS)^{1}	562	1.87	−0.09	0	±0
Asturian Centrists (CAS)	317	1.05	−5.45	0	−2
The Greens of Asturias (LV)	194	0.64	New	0	±0
Communist Party of the Peoples of Spain (PCPE)	93	0.31	New	0	±0
Direct Democracy (DD)	n/a	n/a	−5.18	0	−1
Blank ballots	276	0.92	+0.08		
**Total**	**30,083**			**25**	**±0**
Valid votes	30,083	99.02	−0.18		
Invalid votes	297	0.98	+0.18		
**Votes cast / turnout**	**30,380**	**69.12**	**+10.68**		
Abstentions	13,574	30.88	−10.68		
**Registered voters**	**43,954**				
Sources
Footnotes: ^{1} Asturianist Party results are compared to Asturian Coalition totals in the 1991 election.

=== Oviedo ===
Population: 201,712

← Summary of the 28 May 1995 City Council of Oviedo election results →
Parties and alliances	Popular vote			Seats	
Parties and alliances	Votes	%	±pp	Total	+/−
People's Party (PP)	73,462	62.15	+18.67	**18**	+5
Spanish Socialist Workers' Party (PSOE)	24,783	20.97	−13.17	**6**	−4
United Left (IU)	13,717	11.60	+1.98	**3**	+1
Asturianist Party (PAS)^{1}	1,723	1.46	−0.52	0	±0
Asturian Centrists (CAS)	1,290	1.09	−5.38	0	−2
The Greens of Asturias (LV)	669	0.57	−0.88	0	±0
Asturian League (LA)	432	0.37	New	0	±0
Andecha Astur (AA)	354	0.30	+0.07	0	±0
Blank ballots	1,776	1.50	−0.14		
**Total**	**118,206**			**27**	**±0**
Valid votes	118,206	99.49	−0.02		
Invalid votes	607	0.51	+0.02		
**Votes cast / turnout**	**118,813**	**68.94**	**+12.03**		
Abstentions	53,528	31.06	−12.03		
**Registered voters**	**172,341**				
Sources
Footnotes: ^{1} Asturianist Party results are compared to Asturian Coalition totals in the 1991 election.

=== San Martín del Rey Aurelio ===
Population: 23,519

← Summary of the 28 May 1995 City Council of San Martín del Rey Aurelio election results →
Parties and alliances	Popular vote			Seats	
Parties and alliances	Votes	%	±pp	Total	+/−
Spanish Socialist Workers' Party (PSOE)	6,992	47.81	−0.06	**11**	±0
People's Party (PP)	3,726	25.48	+11.83	**6**	+3
United Left (IU)	3,103	21.22	−6.00	**4**	−2
Asturianist Party (PAS)^{1}	404	2.76	+0.89	0	±0
Andecha Astur (AA)	101	0.69	New	0	±0
Asturian League (LA)	90	0.62	New	0	±0
Asturian Centrists (CAS)	81	0.55	−7.92	0	−1
Blank ballots	129	0.88	−0.03		
**Total**	**14,626**			**21**	**±0**
Valid votes	14,626	99.13	−0.09		
Invalid votes	129	0.87	+0.09		
**Votes cast / turnout**	**14,755**	**75.74**	**+9.33**		
Abstentions	4,727	24.26	−9.33		
**Registered voters**	**19,482**				
Sources
Footnotes: ^{1} Asturianist Party results are compared to Asturian Coalition totals in the 1991 election.

=== Siero ===
Population: 46,232

← Summary of the 28 May 1995 City Council of Siero election results →
Parties and alliances	Popular vote			Seats	
Parties and alliances	Votes	%	±pp	Total	+/−
People's Party (PP)	9,427	39.00	+18.53	**10**	+6
Spanish Socialist Workers' Party (PSOE)	6,493	26.86	−14.71	**6**	−4
United Left (IU)	3,711	15.35	+0.86	**3**	±0
Asturian Council (Conceyu)	2,614	10.81	−2.08	**2**	−1
Asturianist Party (PAS)^{1}	677	2.80	+1.20	0	±0
Asturian Centrists (CAS)	607	2.51	−5.45	0	−1
The Greens of Asturias (LV)	352	1.46	New	0	±0
Blank ballots	290	1.20	+0.19		
**Total**	**24,171**			**21**	**±0**
Valid votes	24,171	98.91	−0.03		
Invalid votes	266	1.09	+0.03		
**Votes cast / turnout**	**24,437**	**66.59**	**+9.18**		
Abstentions	12,259	33.41	−9.18		
**Registered voters**	**36,696**				
Sources
Footnotes: ^{1} Asturianist Party results are compared to Asturian Coalition totals in the 1991 election.

== See also ==
- 1995 Asturian regional election
