= 2007 Spanish local elections in Asturias =

This article presents the results breakdown of the local elections held in Asturias on 27 May 2007. The following tables show detailed results in the autonomous community's most populous municipalities, sorted alphabetically.

== City control ==
The following table lists party control in the most populous municipalities, including provincial capitals (shown in bold). Gains for a party are displayed with the cell's background shaded in that party's colour.

Municipality	Population	Previous control	New control
Avilés	83,538	Spanish Socialist Workers' Party (PSOE)	Spanish Socialist Workers' Party (PSOE)
Gijón	274,472	Spanish Socialist Workers' Party (PSOE)	Spanish Socialist Workers' Party (PSOE)
Langreo	46,076	Spanish Socialist Workers' Party (PSOE)	Spanish Socialist Workers' Party (PSOE)
Mieres	45,645	Spanish Socialist Workers' Party (PSOE)	Spanish Socialist Workers' Party (PSOE)
**Oviedo**	214,883	People's Party (PP)	People's Party (PP)
San Martín del Rey Aurelio	19,430	Spanish Socialist Workers' Party (PSOE)	Spanish Socialist Workers' Party (PSOE)
Siero	49,376	Spanish Socialist Workers' Party (PSOE)	Spanish Socialist Workers' Party (PSOE)

== Municipalities ==
=== Avilés ===
Population: 83,538

← Summary of the 27 May 2007 City Council of Avilés election results →
Parties and alliances	Popular vote			Seats	
Parties and alliances	Votes	%	±pp	Total	+/−
Spanish Socialist Workers' Party (PSOE)	17,587	40.82	+5.21	11	+1
People's Party (PP)	13,280	30.82	−5.62	8	−2
Independent Social Group of Avilés (ASIA)	5,904	13.70	+8.37	4	+3
United Left–Bloc for Asturias–The Greens of Asturias (IU–BA–LV)^{1}	4,042	9.38	−5.96	2	−2
Asturian Renewal Union–Asturianist Party (URAS–PAS)^{2}	699	1.62	−2.12	0	±0
Unity–Asturian Left (Unidá–IAS)	477	1.11	New	0	±0
Communist Party of the Peoples of Spain (PCPE)	152	0.35	+0.13	0	±0
Blank ballots	943	2.19	−0.32		
Total	43,084			25	±0
Valid votes	43,084	99.55	+0.19		
Invalid votes	193	0.45	−0.19		
Votes cast / turnout	43,277	59.80	−1.41		
Abstentions	29,090	40.20	+1.41		
Registered voters	72,367				
Sources
Footnotes: ^{1} United Left–Bloc for Asturias–The Greens of Asturias results are compared to the combined totals of United Left–Bloc for Asturias and The Greens–Avilés Citizen Initiative in the 2003 election.; ^{2} Asturian Renewal Union–Asturianist Party results are compared to the combined totals of Asturianist Party and Asturian Renewal Union in the 2003 election.

=== Gijón ===
Population: 274,472

← Summary of the 27 May 2007 City Council of Gijón election results →
Parties and alliances	Popular vote			Seats	
Parties and alliances	Votes	%	±pp	Total	+/−
Spanish Socialist Workers' Party (PSOE)	63,769	44.45	−0.84	13	±0
People's Party (PP)	58,064	40.47	+4.49	12	+1
United Left–Bloc for Asturias–The Greens of Asturias (IU–BA–LV)^{1}	12,652	8.82	−2.47	2	−1
Asturian Renewal Union–Asturianist Party (URAS–PAS)^{2}	3,315	2.31	−1.92	0	±0
Andecha Astur (AA)	839	0.58	+0.18	0	±0
Communist Party of the Peoples of Spain (PCPE)	826	0.58	+0.31	0	±0
Republican Left (IR)	664	0.46	New	0	±0
Blank ballots	3,328	2.32	+0.14		
Total	143,457			27	±0
Valid votes	143,457	99.48	−0.08		
Invalid votes	745	0.52	+0.08		
Votes cast / turnout	144,202	59.61	−0.73		
Abstentions	97,698	40.39	+0.73		
Registered voters	241,900				
Sources
Footnotes: ^{1} United Left–Bloc for Asturias–The Greens of Asturias results are compared to the combined totals of United Left–Bloc for Asturias and The Greens–Green Left of Asturias in the 2003 election.; ^{2} Asturian Renewal Union–Asturianist Party results are compared to the combined totals of Asturianist Party and Asturian Renewal Union in the 2003 election.

=== Langreo ===
Population: 46,076

← Summary of the 27 May 2007 City Council of Langreo election results →
Parties and alliances	Popular vote			Seats	
Parties and alliances	Votes	%	±pp	Total	+/−
Spanish Socialist Workers' Party (PSOE)	10,073	44.76	+9.11	10	+2
People's Party (PP)	6,288	27.94	+0.92	6	±0
United Left–Bloc for Asturias–The Greens of Asturias (IU–BA–LV)^{1}	5,136	22.82	−8.63	5	−2
Asturian Renewal Union–Asturianist Party (URAS–PAS)^{2}	248	1.10	−1.73	0	±0
Communist Party of the Peoples of Spain (PCPE)	135	0.60	+0.24	0	±0
Andecha Astur (AA)	120	0.53	+0.17	0	±0
Blank ballots	502	2.23	−0.12		
Total	22,502			21	±0
Valid votes	22,502	99.22	+0.04		
Invalid votes	178	0.78	−0.04		
Votes cast / turnout	22,680	55.01	−2.70		
Abstentions	18,546	44.99	+2.70		
Registered voters	41,226				
Sources
Footnotes: ^{1} United Left–Bloc for Asturias–The Greens of Asturias results are compared to the combined totals of United Left–Bloc for Asturias and The Greens–Green Left of Asturias in the 2003 election.; ^{2} Asturian Renewal Union–Asturianist Party results are compared to the combined totals of Asturian Renewal Union and Asturianist Party in the 2003 election.

=== Mieres ===
Population: 45,645

← Summary of the 27 May 2007 City Council of Mieres election results →
Parties and alliances	Popular vote			Seats	
Parties and alliances	Votes	%	±pp	Total	+/−
Spanish Socialist Workers' Party (PSOE)	9,418	40.04	+3.89	9	+1
People's Party (PP)	7,749	32.94	+2.03	7	±0
United Left–Bloc for Asturias–The Greens of Asturias (IU–BA–LV)	5,135	21.83	−3.41	5	−1
Asturian Left–Asturianists (IAS)	231	0.98	−0.38	0	±0
Asturian Renewal Union–Asturianist Party (URAS–PAS)^{1}	154	0.65	−1.19	0	±0
Communist Party of the Peoples of Spain (PCPE)	135	0.57	−0.07	0	±0
Andecha Astur (AA)	135	0.57	+0.04	0	±0
Blank ballots	567	2.41	−0.92		
Total	23,524			21	±0
Valid votes	23,524	99.20	+0.21		
Invalid votes	190	0.80	−0.21		
Votes cast / turnout	23,714	60.08	+0.58		
Abstentions	15,758	39.92	−0.58		
Registered voters	39,472				
Sources
Footnotes: ^{1} Asturian Renewal Union–Asturianist Party results are compared to the combined totals of Asturianist Party and Asturian Renewal Union in the 2003 election.

=== Oviedo ===
Population: 214,883

← Summary of the 27 May 2007 City Council of Oviedo election results →
Parties and alliances	Popular vote			Seats	
Parties and alliances	Votes	%	±pp	Total	+/−
People's Party (PP)	64,237	55.97	−0.02	17	±0
Spanish Socialist Workers' Party (PSOE)	34,331	29.91	+2.29	9	+1
Citizens' Assembly for the Left (ASCIZ)	7,198	6.27	New	1	+1
United Left–Bloc for Asturias–The Greens of Asturias (IU–BA–LV)^{1}	4,244	3.70	−7.45	0	−2
Asturian Renewal Union–Asturianist Party (URAS–PAS)^{2}	654	0.57	−1.09	0	±0
Unity–Asturian Left (Unidá–IAS)	572	0.50	New	0	±0
Andecha Astur (AA)	355	0.31	−0.25	0	±0
National Democracy (DN)	249	0.22	New	0	±0
Communist Party of the Peoples of Spain (PCPE)	168	0.15	+0.02	0	±0
Asturian Democratic Convergence (CDAS)	116	0.10	New	0	±0
Blank ballots	2,651	2.31	−0.25		
Total	114,775			27	±0
Valid votes	114,775	99.53	+0.01		
Invalid votes	546	0.47	−0.01		
Votes cast / turnout	115,321	60.25	−3.48		
Abstentions	76,075	39.75	+3.48		
Registered voters	191,396				
Sources
Footnotes: ^{1} United Left–Bloc for Asturias–The Greens of Asturias results are compared to the combined totals of United Left–Bloc for Asturias and The Greens–Green Left of Asturias in the 2003 election.; ^{2} Asturian Renewal Union–Asturianist Party results are compared to the combined totals of Asturian Renewal Union and Asturianist Party in the 2003 election.

=== San Martín del Rey Aurelio ===
Population: 19,430

← Summary of the 27 May 2007 City Council of San Martín del Rey Aurelio election results →
Parties and alliances	Popular vote			Seats	
Parties and alliances	Votes	%	±pp	Total	+/−
Spanish Socialist Workers' Party (PSOE)	5,081	46.47	−2.16	9	−2
People's Party (PP)	3,092	28.28	+3.29	5	−1
United Left–Bloc for Asturias–The Greens of Asturias (IU–BA–LV)	2,104	19.24	−0.36	3	−1
Asturian Renewal Union–Asturianist Party (URAS–PAS)^{1}	250	2.29	−1.93	0	±0
Unity–Asturian Left (Unidá–IAS)	97	0.89	New	0	±0
Andecha Astur (AA)	42	0.38	−0.12	0	±0
Communist Party of the Peoples of Spain (PCPE)	41	0.38	+0.18	0	±0
Republican Left (IR)	27	0.25	New	0	±0
Blank ballots	199	1.82	−0.04		
Total	10,933			17	−4
Valid votes	10,933	98.66	−0.20		
Invalid votes	148	1.34	+0.20		
Votes cast / turnout	11,081	62.48	−3.12		
Abstentions	6,655	37.52	+3.12		
Registered voters	17,736				
Sources
Footnotes: ^{1} Asturian Renewal Union–Asturianist Party results are compared to the combined totals of Asturian Renewal Union and Asturianist Party in the 2003 election.

=== Siero ===
Population: 49,376

← Summary of the 27 May 2007 City Council of Siero election results →
Parties and alliances	Popular vote			Seats	
Parties and alliances	Votes	%	±pp	Total	+/−
Spanish Socialist Workers' Party (PSOE)	8,343	33.20	−0.69	8	±0
People's Party (PP)	8,295	33.01	−7.60	8	−2
Independent Party of Siero (PINSI)	2,256	8.98	New	2	+2
United Left–Bloc for Asturias–The Greens of Asturias (IU–BA–LV)^{1}	1,966	7.82	−5.82	1	−1
Asturian Council (Conceyu)	1,758	7.00	+1.42	1	±0
La Fresneda Local Platform (PVF)	1,577	6.27	New	1	+1
Asturian Renewal Union–Asturianist Party (URAS–PAS)^{2}	220	0.88	−1.96	0	±0
Andecha Astur (AA)	186	0.74	−0.27	0	±0
Blank ballots	531	2.11	−0.32		
Total	25,132			21	±0
Valid votes	25,132	99.12	+0.01		
Invalid votes	222	0.88	−0.01		
Votes cast / turnout	25,354	60.08	−1.98		
Abstentions	16,847	39.92	+1.98		
Registered voters	42,201				
Sources
Footnotes: ^{1} United Left–Bloc for Asturias–The Greens of Asturias results are compared to the combined totals of United Left–Bloc for Asturias and The Greens–Green Left of Asturias in the 2003 election.; ^{2} Asturian Renewal Union–Asturianist Party results are compared to the combined totals of Asturian Renewal Union and Asturianist Party in the 2003 election.

== See also ==
- 2007 Asturian regional election
