= 1991 Spanish local elections in Asturias =

This article presents the results breakdown of the local elections held in Asturias on 26 May 1991. The following tables show detailed results in the autonomous community's most populous municipalities, sorted alphabetically.

== City control ==
The following table lists party control in the most populous municipalities, including provincial capitals (highlighted in bold). Gains for a party are highlighted in that party's colour.

Municipality	Population	Previous control	New control
Avilés	88,429	Spanish Socialist Workers' Party (PSOE)	Spanish Socialist Workers' Party (PSOE)
Gijón	264,948	Spanish Socialist Workers' Party (PSOE)	Spanish Socialist Workers' Party (PSOE)
Langreo	53,246	Spanish Socialist Workers' Party (PSOE)	Spanish Socialist Workers' Party (PSOE)
Mieres	57,627	Spanish Socialist Workers' Party (PSOE)	Spanish Socialist Workers' Party (PSOE)
**Oviedo**	194,637	Spanish Socialist Workers' Party (PSOE)	People's Party (PP)
San Martín del Rey Aurelio	24,884	Spanish Socialist Workers' Party (PSOE)	Spanish Socialist Workers' Party (PSOE)
Siero	43,647	Spanish Socialist Workers' Party (PSOE)	Spanish Socialist Workers' Party (PSOE)

== Municipalities ==
=== Avilés ===
Population: 88,429

← Summary of the 26 May 1991 City Council of Avilés election results →
Parties and alliances	Popular vote			Seats	
Parties and alliances	Votes	%	±pp	Total	+/−
Spanish Socialist Workers' Party (PSOE)	16,926	42.55	+2.77	12	+2
People's Party (PP)^{1}	10,523	26.46	+7.19	7	+2
United Left (IU)	7,624	19.17	+4.68	5	+1
Democratic and Social Centre (CDS)	2,538	6.38	−17.24	1	−5
Asturian Coalition (PAS–UNA)	1,562	3.93	New	0	±0
Blank ballots	602	1.51	+0.48		
Total	39,775			25	±0
Valid votes	39,775	99.50	+1.05		
Invalid votes	201	0.50	−1.05		
Votes cast / turnout	39,976	57.03	−13.22		
Abstentions	30,118	42.97	+13.22		
Registered voters	70,094				
Sources
Footnotes: ^{1} People's Party results are compared to the combined totals of People's Alliance and People's Democratic Party in the 1987 election.

=== Gijón ===
Population: 264,948

← Summary of the 26 May 1991 City Council of Gijón election results →
Parties and alliances	Popular vote			Seats	
Parties and alliances	Votes	%	±pp	Total	+/−
Spanish Socialist Workers' Party (PSOE)	42,922	38.05	+0.37	12	+1
People's Party (PP)^{1}	29,882	26.49	+2.34	9	+2
Gijonese Unity (UGJ)	13,127	11.64	New	3	+3
United Left (IU)	13,093	11.61	−0.12	3	±0
Democratic and Social Centre (CDS)	4,933	4.37	−16.18	0	−6
Asturian Coalition (PAS–UNA)^{2}	2,830	2.51	+0.02	0	±0
The Greens (LV)	1,765	1.56	New	0	±0
Gijonese Garments Workers (TGC)	1,652	1.46	New	0	±0
Independents for Gijón (INGI)	740	0.66	New	0	±0
Left Platform (PCE (m–l)–CRPE)	552	0.49	New	0	±0
Independent Council of Asturias (Conceyu)	273	0.24	New	0	±0
Blank ballots	1,021	0.91	−0.41		
Total	112,790			27	±0
Valid votes	112,790	99.40	+1.25		
Invalid votes	677	0.60	−1.25		
Votes cast / turnout	113,467	53.03	−10.22		
Abstentions	100,510	46.97	+10.22		
Registered voters	213,977				
Sources
Footnotes: ^{1} People's Party results are compared to the combined totals of People's Alliance and People's Democratic Party in the 1987 election.; ^{2} Asturian Coalition results are compared to Asturianist Party totals in the 1987 election.

=== Langreo ===
Population: 53,246

← Summary of the 26 May 1991 City Council of Langreo election results →
Parties and alliances	Popular vote			Seats	
Parties and alliances	Votes	%	±pp	Total	+/−
Spanish Socialist Workers' Party (PSOE)	9,956	40.02	+3.07	11	+1
United Left (IU)	8,056	32.38	+4.55	9	+2
People's Party (PP)^{1}	4,346	17.47	+2.12	4	±0
Democratic and Social Centre (CDS)	1,608	6.46	−11.07	1	−3
Asturian Coalition (PAS–UNA)	487	1.96	New	0	±0
Independent Council of Asturias (Conceyu)	155	0.62	New	0	±0
Blank ballots	270	1.09	−0.01		
Total	24,878			25	±0
Valid votes	24,878	99.27	+0.75		
Invalid votes	182	0.73	−0.75		
Votes cast / turnout	25,060	56.51	−12.14		
Abstentions	19,286	43.49	+12.14		
Registered voters	44,346				
Sources
Footnotes: ^{1} People's Party results are compared to People's Alliance totals in the 1987 election.

=== Mieres ===
Population: 57,627

← Summary of the 26 May 1991 City Council of Mieres election results →
Parties and alliances	Popular vote			Seats	
Parties and alliances	Votes	%	±pp	Total	+/−
Spanish Socialist Workers' Party (PSOE)	9,970	38.30	+3.37	11	+1
United Left (IU)	5,764	22.15	−5.09	6	−1
People's Party (PP)^{1}	4,534	17.42	+2.29	5	+1
Democratic and Social Centre (CDS)	1,693	6.50	−9.87	2	−2
Direct Democracy (DD)	1,349	5.18	New	1	+1
Communist Movement of Asturias (MCA)	1,251	4.81	−0.12	0	±0
Asturian Convergence (CA)	681	2.62	New	0	±0
Asturian Coalition (PAS–UNA)	510	1.96	New	0	±0
Andecha Astur (AA)	58	0.22	New	0	±0
Blank ballots	218	0.84	−0.22		
Total	26,028			25	±0
Valid votes	26,028	99.20	+0.58		
Invalid votes	209	0.80	−0.58		
Votes cast / turnout	26,237	58.44	−12.64		
Abstentions	18,655	41.56	+12.64		
Registered voters	44,892				
Sources
Footnotes: ^{1} People's Party results are compared to People's Alliance totals in the 1987 election.

=== Oviedo ===
Population: 194,637

← Summary of the 26 May 1991 City Council of Oviedo election results →
Parties and alliances	Popular vote			Seats	
Parties and alliances	Votes	%	±pp	Total	+/−
People's Party (PP)^{1}	39,007	43.48	+10.51	13	+3
Spanish Socialist Workers' Party (PSOE)	30,634	34.14	−7.88	10	−2
United Left (IU)	8,635	9.62	+3.24	2	+1
Democratic and Social Centre (CDS)	5,803	6.47	−8.75	2	−2
Asturian Coalition (PAS–UNA)	1,773	1.98	New	0	±0
The Greens (LV)	1,300	1.45	New	0	±0
Asturian Convergence (CA)	624	0.70	New	0	±0
Independent Council of Asturias (Conceyu)	262	0.29	New	0	±0
Andecha Astur (AA)	207	0.23	New	0	±0
Blank ballots	1,475	1.64	+0.24		
Total	89,720			27	±0
Valid votes	89,720	99.51	+1.02		
Invalid votes	445	0.49	−1.02		
Votes cast / turnout	90,165	56.91	−10.63		
Abstentions	68,260	43.09	+10.63		
Registered voters	158,425				
Sources
Footnotes: ^{1} People's Party results are compared to the combined totals of People's Alliance and People's Democratic Party in the 1987 election.

=== San Martín del Rey Aurelio ===
Population: 24,884

← Summary of the 26 May 1991 City Council of San Martín del Rey Aurelio election results →
Parties and alliances	Popular vote			Seats	
Parties and alliances	Votes	%	±pp	Total	+/−
Spanish Socialist Workers' Party (PSOE)	6,409	47.87	+6.08	11	+2
United Left (IU)	3,644	27.22	−1.36	6	±0
People's Party (PP)^{1}	1,827	13.65	+3.54	3	+1
Democratic and Social Centre (CDS)	1,134	8.47	−9.81	1	−3
Asturian Coalition (PAS–UNA)	251	1.87	New	0	±0
Blank ballots	122	0.91	−0.34		
Total	13,387			21	±0
Valid votes	13,387	99.22	+0.53		
Invalid votes	105	0.78	−0.53		
Votes cast / turnout	13,492	66.41	−9.83		
Abstentions	6,824	33.59	+9.83		
Registered voters	20,316				
Sources
Footnotes: ^{1} People's Party results are compared to People's Alliance totals in the 1987 election.

=== Siero ===
Population: 43,647

← Summary of the 26 May 1991 City Council of Siero election results →
Parties and alliances	Popular vote			Seats	
Parties and alliances	Votes	%	±pp	Total	+/−
Spanish Socialist Workers' Party (PSOE)	8,077	41.57	−3.18	10	±0
People's Party (PP)^{1}	3,977	20.47	+0.48	4	±0
United Left (IU)	2,816	14.49	+0.80	3	±0
Independent Council of Asturias (Conceyu)	2,505	12.89	New	3	+3
Democratic and Social Centre (CDS)	1,547	7.96	−12.34	1	−3
Asturian Coalition (PAS–UNA)	311	1.60	New	0	±0
Blank ballots	196	1.01	−0.25		
Total	19,429			21	±0
Valid votes	19,429	98.94	+0.23		
Invalid votes	209	1.06	−0.23		
Votes cast / turnout	19,638	57.41	−6.32		
Abstentions	14,571	42.59	+6.32		
Registered voters	34,209				
Sources
Footnotes: ^{1} People's Party results are compared to People's Alliance totals in the 1987 election.

== See also ==
- 1991 Asturian regional election
