= 1995 Asturian regional election =

Election in the Spanish region of Asturias

- 28 May 1995

All 45 seats in the General Junta of the Principality of Asturias 23 seats needed for a majority
- Opinion polls
- Registered: 945,105 ▲3.5%
- Turnout: 652,640 (69.1%) ▲10.4 pp

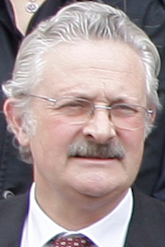

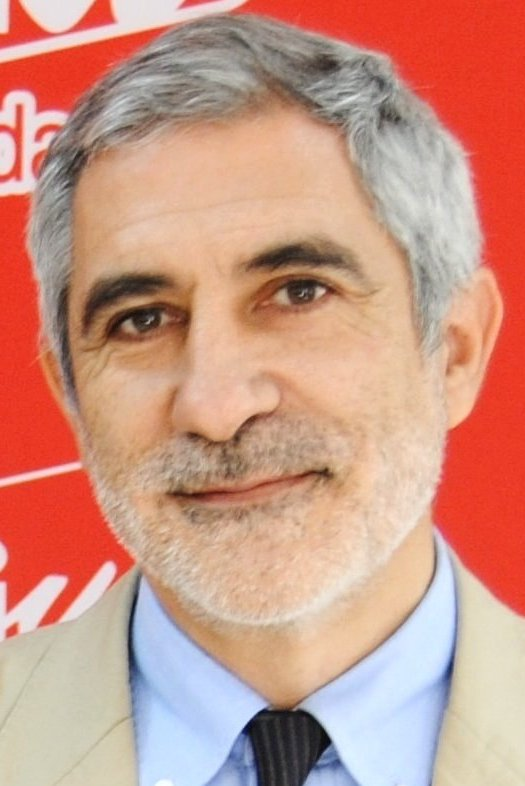

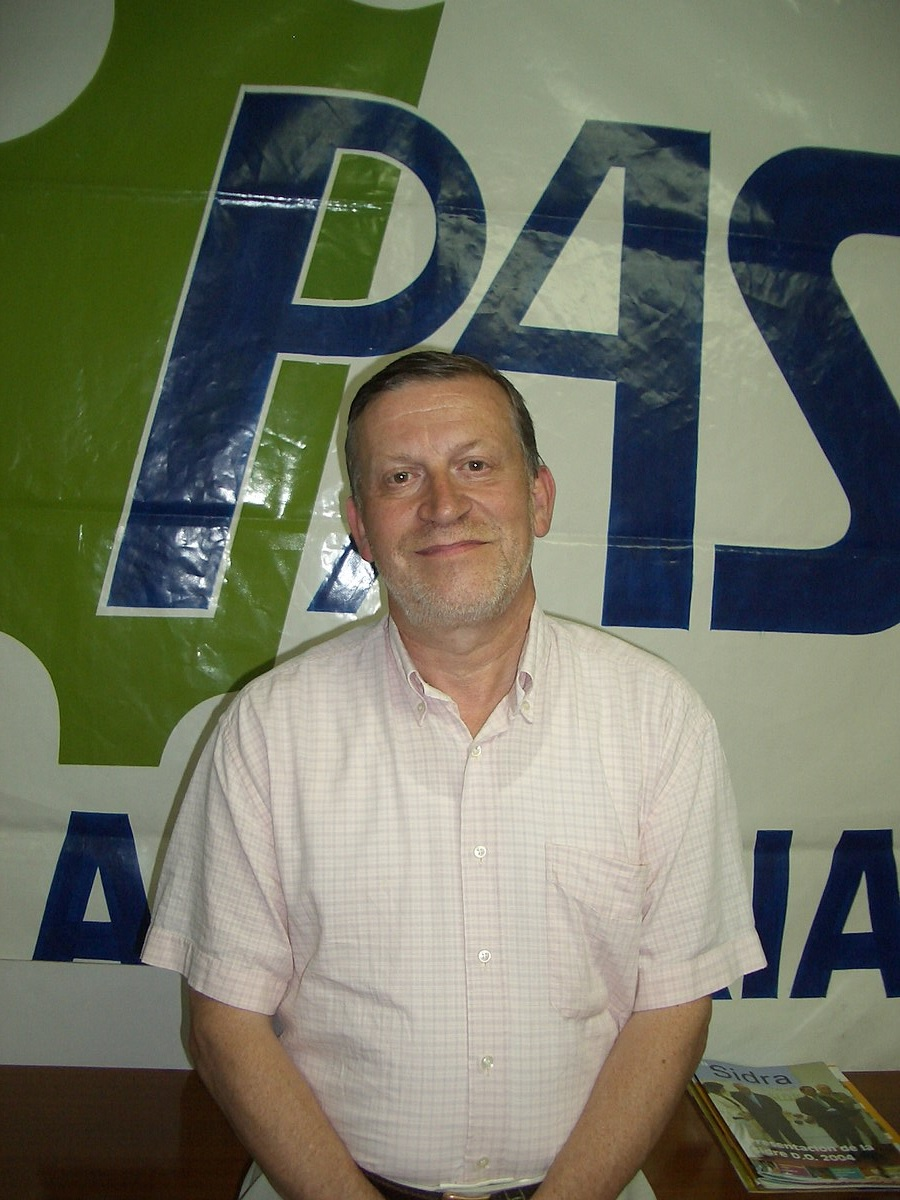

	First party	Second party	Third party
Leader	Sergio Marqués	Antonio Trevín	Gaspar Llamazares
Party	PP	PSOE	IU
Leader since	1995	17 June 1993	1991
Leader's seat	Central	Eastern	Central
Last election	15 seats, 30.4%	21 seats, 41.0%	6 seats, 14.8%
Seats won	21	17	6
Seat change	▲6	▼4	0
Popular vote	272,495	219,527	106,538
Percentage	42.0%	33.8%	16.4%
Swing	▲11.6 pp	▼7.2 pp	▲1.6 pp
	Fourth party	Fifth party
Leader	Xuan Xosé Sánchez Vicente	Alfonso Román
Party	PAS	CDS
Leader since	1985	1995
Leader's seat	Central	Central (lost)
Last election	1 seat, 2.7% (Note: Results for PAS–UNA in the 1991 election.)	2 seats, 6.7%
Seats won	1	0
Seat change	0	▼2
Popular vote	20,669	11,555
Percentage	3.2%	1.8%
Swing	▲0.5 pp	▼4.9 pp
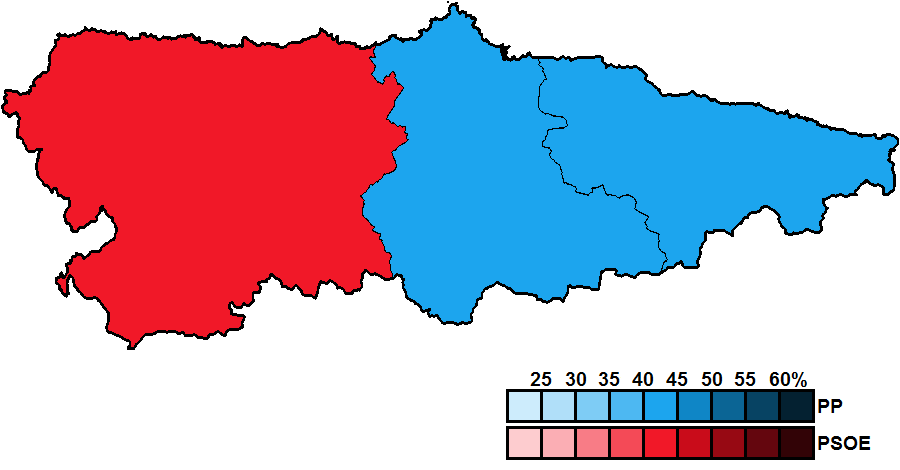
- Constituency results map for the General Junta of the Principality of Asturias
President before election
Antonio Trevín
PSOE
Elected President
Sergio Marqués
PP

The 1995 Asturian regional election was held on 28 May 1995 to elect the 4th General Junta of the Principality of Asturias. All 45 seats in the General Junta were up for election. It was held concurrently with regional elections in twelve other autonomous communities and local elections all throughout Spain.

The election was won by the People's Party (PP) under Sergio Marqués, which became the most-voted party in the region for the first and, to date, only time. The Spanish Socialist Workers' Party (PSOE) vote suffered from the population weariness after 12 years of Socialist governments, the economic crisis and the eruption of numerous scandals both at the regional and the national level (one such scandal had forced the resignation of President Juan Luis Rodríguez-Vigil in 1993). United Left (IU) scored a record result despite failing to win any new seats, while the Democratic and Social Centre (CDS) was expelled from the regional legislature.

== Overview ==
=== Electoral system ===
The General Junta of the Principality of Asturias was the devolved, unicameral legislature of the autonomous community of Asturias, having legislative power in regional matters as defined by the Spanish Constitution and the Asturian Statute of Autonomy, as well as the ability to vote confidence in or withdraw it from a regional president.

Voting for the General Junta was on the basis of universal suffrage, which comprised all nationals over 18 years of age, registered in Asturias and in full enjoyment of their political rights. The 45 members of the General Junta of the Principality of Asturias were elected using the D'Hondt method and a closed list proportional representation, with an electoral threshold of three percent of valid votes—which included blank ballots—being applied in each constituency. Seats were allocated to constituencies, which were established by law as follows:

- Central District, comprising the municipalities of Aller, Avilés, Bimenes, Carreño, Caso, Castrillón, Corvera de Asturias, Gijón, Gozón, Illas, Las Regueras, Langreo, Laviana, Lena, Llanera, Mieres, Morcín, Noreña, Oviedo, Proaza, Quirós, Ribera de Arriba, Riosa, San Martín del Rey Aurelio, Santo Adriano, Sariego, Siero, Sobrescobio and Soto del Barco.
- Eastern District, comprising the municipalities of Amieva, Cabrales, Cabranes, Cangas de Onís, Caravia, Colunga, Llanes, Nava, Onís, Parres, Peñamellera Alta, Peñamellera Baja, Piloña, Ponga, Ribadedeva, Ribadesella and Villaviciosa.
- Western District, comprising the municipalities of Allande, Belmonte de Miranda, Boal, Candamo, Cangas del Narcea, Castropol, Coaña, Cudillero, Degaña, El Franco, Grado, Grandas de Salime, Ibias, Illano, Muros de Nalón, Navia, Pesoz, Pravia, Salas, San Martín de Oscos, Santa Eulalia de Oscos, San Tirso de Abres, Somiedo, Tapia de Casariego, Taramundi, Teverga, Tineo, Valdés, Vegadeo, Villanueva de Oscos, Villayón and Yernes y Tameza.

Each constituency was allocated an initial minimum of two seats, with the remaining 39 being distributed in proportion to their populations.

In smaller constituencies, the use of the electoral method resulted in an effective threshold based on the district magnitude and the distribution of votes among candidacies.

The electoral law allowed for parties and federations registered in the interior ministry, coalitions and groupings of electors to present lists of candidates. Parties and federations intending to form a coalition ahead of an election were required to inform the relevant Electoral Commission within ten days of the election call, whereas groupings of electors needed to secure the signature of at least one percent of the electorate in the constituencies for which they sought election, disallowing electors from signing for more than one list of candidates.

=== Election date ===
The term of the General Junta of the Principality of Asturias expired four years after the date of its previous election. Elections to the General Junta were fixed for the fourth Sunday of May every four years. The previous election was held on 26 May 1991, setting the election date for the General Junta on 28 May 1995.

The General Junta could not be dissolved before the expiration date of parliament except in the event of an investiture process failing to elect a regional president within a two-month period from the first ballot. In such a case, the General Junta was to be automatically dissolved and a snap election called, with elected lawmakers serving the remainder of its original four-year term.

== Opinion polls ==
The table below lists voting intention estimates in reverse chronological order, showing the most recent first and using the dates when the survey fieldwork was done, as opposed to the date of publication. Where the fieldwork dates are unknown, the date of publication is given instead. The highest percentage figure in each polling survey is displayed with its background shaded in the leading party's colour. If a tie ensues, this is applied to the figures with the highest percentages. The "Lead" column on the right shows the percentage-point difference between the parties with the highest percentages in a poll. When available, seat projections determined by the polling organisations are displayed below (or in place of) the percentages in a smaller font; 23 seats were required for an absolute majority in the General Junta of the Principality of Asturias.

Color key:

Exit poll

Polling firm/Commissioner	Fieldwork date	Sample size	Turnout	PSOE	PP	IU	CDS	PAS	Lead
1995 regional election	28 May 1995	—N/a	69.1	33.8; 17	42.0; 21	16.4; 6	1.8; 0	3.2; 1	8.2
Eco Consulting/RTVE	28 May 1995	?	?	33.0; 16/18	41.9; 20/22	15.7; 6/7	–	4.1; 1	8.9
Vox Pública–ODEC/Antena 3	28 May 1995	?	?	? 15/18	? 20/23	–	–	–	?
Demoscopia/El País	10–15 May 1995	1,000	?	31.0; 15/16	41.5; 20/21	16.5; 7/8	–	–	10.5
CIS	24 Apr–10 May 1995	600	71.2	34.0	39.0	17.5	–	3.9	5.0
1994 EP election	12 Jun 1994	—N/a	58.2	32.1	42.6	19.5	1.5	1.8	10.5
1993 general election	6 Jun 1993	—N/a	75.4	39.3	37.4	15.4	3.7	1.6	1.9
1991 regional election	26 May 1991	—N/a	58.7	41.0; 21	30.4; 15	14.8; 6	6.7; 2	2.7; 1	10.6

== Results ==
=== Overall ===
← Summary of the 28 May 1995 General Junta of the Principality of Asturias election results →
Parties and alliances	Popular vote			Seats	
Parties and alliances	Votes	%	±pp	Total	+/−
People's Party (PP)	272,495	42.00	+11.60	21	+6
Spanish Socialist Workers' Party (PSOE)	219,527	33.83	−7.19	17	−4
United Left (IU)	106,538	16.42	+1.57	6	±0
Asturianist Party (PAS)^{1}	20,669	3.19	+0.45	1	±0
Asturian Centre–Democratic and Social Centre (CA–CDS)	11,555	1.78	−4.97	0	−2
The Greens of Asturias (LV)	4,504	0.69	−0.68	0	±0
Asturian League (LA)	1,959	0.30	New	0	±0
Andecha Astur (AA)	1,948	0.30	+0.09	0	±0
Communist Party of the Peoples of Spain (PCPE)	1,108	0.17	−0.16	0	±0
Asturian Council (Conceyu)	862	0.13	−0.23	0	±0
Blank ballots	7,655	1.18	−0.05		
Total	648,820			45	±0
Valid votes	648,820	99.41	+0.16		
Invalid votes	3,820	0.59	−0.16		
Votes cast / turnout	652,640	69.05	+10.36		
Abstentions	292,465	30.95	−10.36		
Registered voters	945,105				
Sources
Footnotes: ^{1} Asturianist Party results are compared to Asturian Coalition totals in the 1991 election.

Popular vote
PP	42.00%
PSOE	33.83%
IU	16.42%
PAS	3.19%
CA–CDS	1.78%
Others	1.60%
Blank ballots	1.18%

Seats
PP	46.67%
PSOE	37.78%
IU	13.33%
PAS	2.22%

=== Distribution by constituency ===
Constituency	PP		PSOE		IU		PAS	
Constituency	%	S	%	S	%	S	%	S
Central	42.0	15	31.4	11	18.6	6	3.5	1
Eastern	44.1	3	42.6	2	6.5	−	2.8	−
Western	40.7	3	43.5	4	9.2	−	1.4	−
Total	42.0	21	33.8	17	16.4	6	3.2	1

== Aftermath ==
=== Government formation ===
Investiture
Ballot →	7 July 1995		10 July 1995	
Required majority →	23 out of 45		Simple	
Sergio Marqués (PP): • PP (21)	21 / 45	X mark	21 / 45	check
Antonio Trevín (PSOE): • PSOE (17)	17 / 45	X mark	17 / 45	X mark
Gaspar Llamazares (IU): • IU (6) (on 7 Jul)	6 / 45	X mark	Eliminated	
Abstentions: • IU (6) (on 10 Jul); • PAS (1)	1 / 45		7 / 45	
Absentees	0 / 45		0 / 45	

=== 1999 motion of no confidence ===
Motion of no confidence Ovidio Sánchez (PP)
Ballot →	10 March 1999
Required majority →	23 out of 45
Yes: • PP (16)	16 / 45
No: • URAS (5); • Independent (1)	6 / 45
Abstentions: • PSOE (15); • IU (4); • PAS (1)	20 / 45
Absentees: • PSOE (2); • IU (1)	3 / 45
