= Xesús Cañedo =

Spanish politician

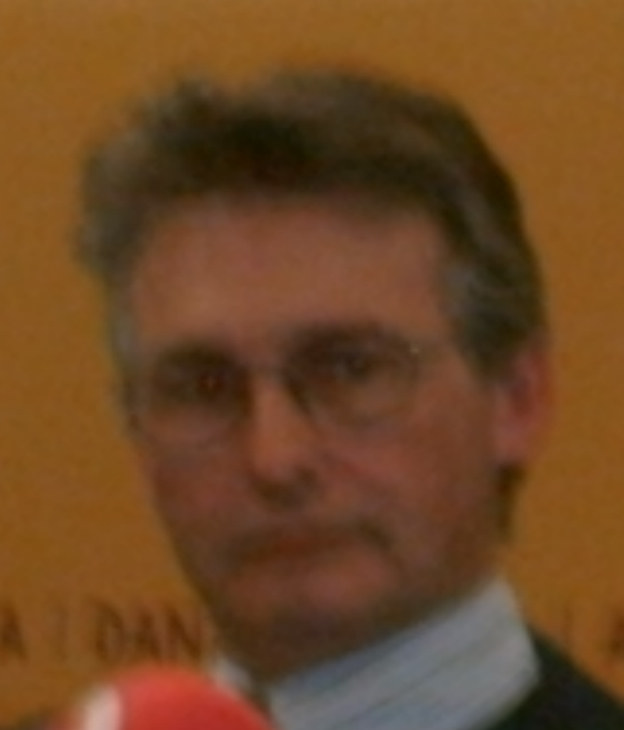
Cañedo in 2006

Xesús Cañedo Valle (9 December 1958 – 1 January 2026) was a Spanish Asturian politician and Asturian cultural and language activist. In 1985, Cañedo co-founded the Partíu Asturianista (PAS), a social democratic, Asturian nationalist political party, alingside Xuan Xosé Sánchez Vicente and Carlos Rubiera.

== Biography ==
Cañedo, who was born on 9 December 1958, in Trubia, located in the parish of L'Abadía Cenero in Gijón. He received a law degree from the University of Oviedo. He then worked in the baking sector, including within the legal department at Banco Urquijo in Bilbao and the Balearic Islands.

Xesús Cañedo was a key figure in the Asturian nationalism movement, especially in the cultural and political spheres. He was a strong proponent for the usage and protection of the Asturian language. Cañedo was a leading member of Conceyu Bable, an organization dedicated to the promotion and recovery of Asturia's native language.

Cañedo was initially a member of the now defunct People's Socialist Party before joining the Spanish Socialist Workers' Party (PSOE). He left the PSOE in 1983. Two years after leaving the PSOE, Cañedo joined with Xuan Xosé Sánchez Vicente and Carlos Rubiera to co-found the Partíu Asturianista (PAS) in 1985.

Cañedo worked as an advisor to the General Junta of the Principality of Asturias. He and Xuan Xosé Sánchez Vicente helped to craft the landmark 1998 Law for the Use and Promotion of Asturian, which is considered an important milestone in the recognition of the Asturian language for official, institutional use in the principality. He also authored several books on Asturian proverbs and language, including Los dioses derrotados, Refranero asturiano, and Mundu, saber y decir nel refraneru (which was co-written with Xuan Xosé Sánchez Vicente).

Xesús Cañedo died unexpectedly at the age of 67 on 1 January 2026 in Tenerife, Canary Islands, while vacationing with his family. He was survived by his wife, Carmela, their sons Antón and Nel, and three granddaughters.
