= 1991 Asturian regional election =

Election in the Spanish region of Asturias

- 26 May 1991

All 45 seats in the General Junta of the Principality of Asturias 23 seats needed for a majority
- Opinion polls
- Registered: 913,215 ▲4.4%
- Turnout: 535,967 (58.7%) ▼6.9 pp

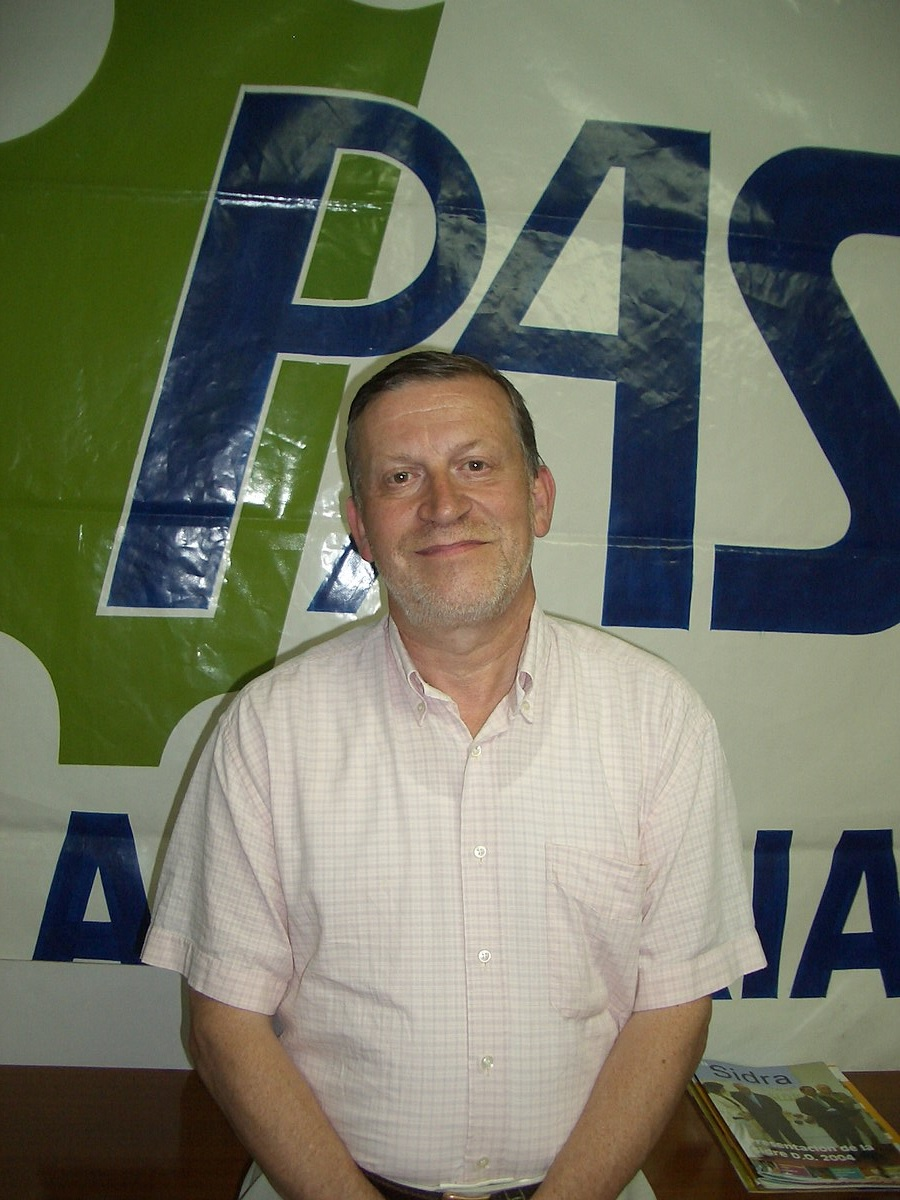
	First party	Second party	Third party
Leader	Juan Luis Rodríguez-Vigil	Isidro Fernández Rozada	Laura González
Party	PSOE	PP	IU
Leader since	20 March 1991	1983	1991
Leader's seat	Central	Central	Central
Last election	20 seats, 38.9%	13 seats, 25.8% (Note: Results for AP (25.18%, 13 seats) and PDP (0.63%, 0 seats) in the 1987 election.)	4 seats, 12.1%
Seats won	21	15	6
Seat change	▲1	▲2	▲2
Popular vote	218,193	161,703	78,982
Percentage	41.0%	30.4%	14.8%
Swing	▲2.1 pp	▲4.6 pp	▲2.7 pp
	Fourth party	Fifth party
Leader	Adolfo Barthe Aza	Xuan Xosé Sánchez Vicente
Party	CDS	PAS–UNA
Leader since	1987	1985
Leader's seat	Central	Central
Last election	8 seats, 18.5%	0 seats, 1.3% (Note: Results for PAS in the 1987 election.)
Seats won	2	1
Seat change	▼6	▲1
Popular vote	35,884	14,569
Percentage	6.7%	2.7%
Swing	▼11.8 pp	▲1.4 pp
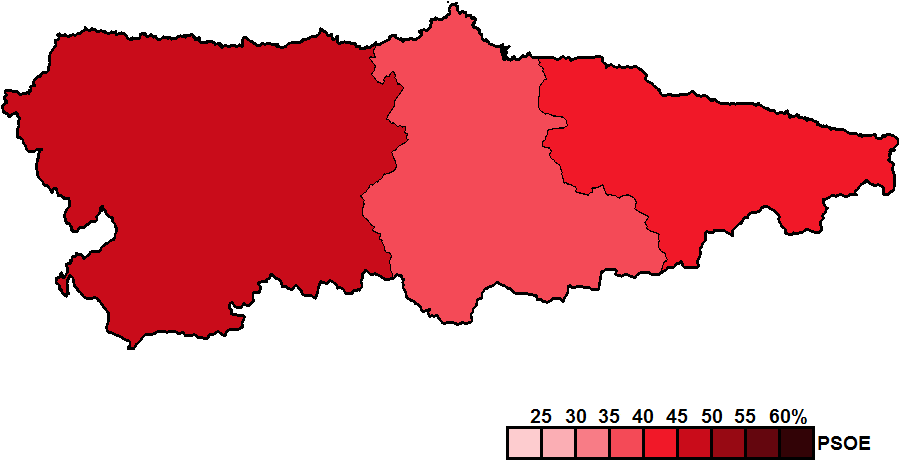
- Constituency results map for the General Junta of the Principality of Asturias
President before election
Pedro de Silva
PSOE
Elected President
Juan Luis Rodríguez-Vigil
PSOE

The 1991 Asturian regional election was held on 26 May 1991 to elect the 3rd General Junta of the Principality of Asturias. All 45 seats in the General Junta were up for election. It was held concurrently with regional elections in twelve other autonomous communities and local elections all throughout Spain.

The Democratic and Social Centre (CDS) suffered a significant drop of its vote share, losing 6 out of the 8 seats it had held previous to the 1991 election and around 2/3 of its votes. On the other hand, all three Spanish Socialist Workers' Party (PSOE), newly founded People's Party (PP) (successor party to the late People's Alliance) and United Left (IU) won seats. Additionally, the Asturianist Party (PAS) was able to overcome the 3% threshold in the Central District and entered the General Junta with 1 seat.

After the election, Juan Luis Rodríguez-Vigil was elected President of Asturias, succeeding Pedro de Silva who did not stand for re-election to a third term in office.

== Overview ==
=== Electoral system ===
The General Junta of the Principality of Asturias was the devolved, unicameral legislature of the autonomous community of Asturias, having legislative power in regional matters as defined by the Spanish Constitution and the Asturian Statute of Autonomy, as well as the ability to vote confidence in or withdraw it from a regional president.

Voting for the General Junta was on the basis of universal suffrage, which comprised all nationals over 18 years of age, registered in Asturias and in full enjoyment of their political rights. The 45 members of the General Junta of the Principality of Asturias were elected using the D'Hondt method and a closed list proportional representation, with an electoral threshold of three percent of valid votes—which included blank ballots—being applied in each constituency. Seats were allocated to constituencies, which were established by law as follows:

- Central District, comprising the municipalities of Aller, Avilés, Bimenes, Carreño, Caso, Castrillón, Corvera de Asturias, Gijón, Gozón, Illas, Las Regueras, Langreo, Laviana, Lena, Llanera, Mieres, Morcín, Noreña, Oviedo, Proaza, Quirós, Ribera de Arriba, Riosa, San Martín del Rey Aurelio, Santo Adriano, Sariego, Siero, Sobrescobio and Soto del Barco.
- Eastern District, comprising the municipalities of Amieva, Cabrales, Cabranes, Cangas de Onís, Caravia, Colunga, Llanes, Nava, Onís, Parres, Peñamellera Alta, Peñamellera Baja, Piloña, Ponga, Ribadedeva, Ribadesella and Villaviciosa.
- Western District, comprising the municipalities of Allande, Belmonte de Miranda, Boal, Candamo, Cangas del Narcea, Castropol, Coaña, Cudillero, Degaña, El Franco, Grado, Grandas de Salime, Ibias, Illano, Muros de Nalón, Navia, Pesoz, Pravia, Salas, San Martín de Oscos, Santa Eulalia de Oscos, San Tirso de Abres, Somiedo, Tapia de Casariego, Taramundi, Teverga, Tineo, Valdés, Vegadeo, Villanueva de Oscos, Villayón and Yernes y Tameza.

Each constituency was allocated an initial minimum of two seats, with the remaining 39 being distributed in proportion to their populations.

In smaller constituencies, the use of the electoral method resulted in an effective threshold based on the district magnitude and the distribution of votes among candidacies.

The electoral law allowed for parties and federations registered in the interior ministry, coalitions and groupings of electors to present lists of candidates. Parties and federations intending to form a coalition ahead of an election were required to inform the relevant Electoral Commission within ten days of the election call, whereas groupings of electors needed to secure the signature of at least one percent of the electorate in the constituencies for which they sought election, disallowing electors from signing for more than one list of candidates.

=== Election date ===
The term of the General Junta of the Principality of Asturias expired four years after the date of its previous election. Legal amendments earlier in 1991 established that elections to the General Junta were to be fixed for the fourth Sunday of May every four years. The previous election was held on 10 June 1987, setting the election date for the General Junta on 26 May 1991.

The General Junta could not be dissolved before the expiration date of parliament except in the event of an investiture process failing to elect a regional president within a two-month period from the first ballot. In such a case, the General Junta was to be automatically dissolved and a snap election called, with elected lawmakers serving the remainder of its original four-year term.

== Opinion polls ==
The table below lists voting intention estimates in reverse chronological order, showing the most recent first and using the dates when the survey fieldwork was done, as opposed to the date of publication. Where the fieldwork dates are unknown, the date of publication is given instead. The highest percentage figure in each polling survey is displayed with its background shaded in the leading party's colour. If a tie ensues, this is applied to the figures with the highest percentages. The "Lead" column on the right shows the percentage-point difference between the parties with the highest percentages in a poll. When available, seat projections determined by the polling organisations are displayed below (or in place of) the percentages in a smaller font; 23 seats were required for an absolute majority in the General Junta of the Principality of Asturias.

Polling firm/Commissioner	Fieldwork date	Sample size	Turnout	PSOE	AP	CDS	IU	PAS	PDP	LV	PP	Lead
1991 regional election	26 May 1991	—N/a	58.7	41.0; 21	(Note: Within PP.)	6.7; 2	14.8; 6	2.7; 1		1.4; 0	30.4; 15	10.6
Sigma Dos/El Mundo	18 May 1991	?	?	39.8; 19/21		12.5; 4/5	16.2; 6/7	–		–	26.1; 13/14	13.7
Metra Seis/El Independiente	12 May 1991	?	?	38.1; 20		9.4; 3	16.1; 7	–		4.4; 1	26.9; 14	11.2
Demoscopia/El País	4–7 May 1991	600	?	39.6; 20/21		6.8; 2/3	15.6; 6	–		4.2; 0	32.2; 16/17	7.4
1989 general election	29 Oct 1989	—N/a	68.9	40.6		12.5	15.6	0.6		0.7	26.5	14.1
1989 EP election	15 Jun 1989	—N/a	54.4	41.5		11.3	11.7	1.1		0.9	22.5	19.0
1987 regional election	10 Jun 1987	—N/a	66.6	38.9; 20	25.2; 13	18.5; 8	12.1; 4	1.3; 0	0.6; 0	–	–	13.7

== Results ==
=== Overall ===
← Summary of the 26 May 1991 General Junta of the Principality of Asturias election results →
Parties and alliances	Popular vote			Seats	
Parties and alliances	Votes	%	±pp	Total	+/−
Spanish Socialist Workers' Party (PSOE)	218,193	41.02	+2.11	21	+1
People's Party (PP)^{1}	161,703	30.40	+4.59	15	+2
United Left (IU)	78,982	14.85	+2.76	6	+2
Democratic and Social Centre (CDS)	35,884	6.75	−11.77	2	−6
Asturian Coalition (PAS–UNA)^{2}	14,569	2.74	+1.46	1	+1
The Greens (LV)	7,299	1.37	New	0	±0
Gijonese Garments Workers (TGC)	2,678	0.50	New	0	±0
Independent Council of Asturias (Conceyu)	1,938	0.36	New	0	±0
Communist Party of the Peoples of Spain (PCPE)	1,768	0.33	New	0	±0
Asturian People's Union (UPA)	1,263	0.24	New	0	±0
Andecha Astur (AA)	1,137	0.21	New	0	±0
Blank ballots	6,533	1.23	±0.00		
Total	531,947			45	±0
Valid votes	531,947	99.25	+0.65		
Invalid votes	4,020	0.75	−0.65		
Votes cast / turnout	535,967	58.69	−7.89		
Abstentions	377,248	41.31	+7.89		
Registered voters	913,215				
Sources
Footnotes: ^{1} People's Party results are compared to the combined totals of People's Alliance and People's Democratic Party in the 1987 election.; ^{2} Asturian Coalition results are compared to Asturianist Party totals in the 1987 election.

Popular vote
PSOE	41.02%
PP	30.40%
IU	14.85%
CDS	6.75%
PAS–UNA	2.74%
LV	1.37%
Others	1.65%
Blank ballots	1.23%

Seats
PSOE	46.67%
PP	33.33%
IU	13.33%
CDS	4.44%
PAS–UNA	2.22%

=== Distribution by constituency ===
Constituency	PSOE		PP		IU		CDS		PAS–UNA	
Constituency	%	S	%	S	%	S	%	S	%	S
Central	39.1	13	29.4	10	17.1	6	6.4	2	3.1	1
Eastern	45.0	3	37.5	2	5.0	−	7.5	−	2.3	−
Western	48.1	5	31.3	3	9.3	−	7.8	−	1.0	−
Total	41.0	21	30.4	15	14.8	6	6.7	2	2.7	1

== Aftermath ==
=== Government formation ===
Investiture
Ballot →	22 June 1991	
Required majority →	23 out of 45	
Juan Luis Rodríguez-Vigil (PSOE): • PSOE (20); • IU (6)	26 / 45	check
Abstentions: • PP (15); • CDS (2); • PAS (1)	18 / 45	
Absentees: • PSOE (1)	1 / 45	

=== 1993 investiture ===
Investiture
Ballot →	15 June 1993		17 June 1993	
Required majority →	23 out of 45		Simple	
Antonio Trevín (PSOE): • PSOE (20)	20 / 45	X mark	20 / 45	check
Abstentions: • PP (15); • IU (6); • CDS (2); • PAS (1)	24 / 45		24 / 45	
Absentees: • PSOE (1)	1 / 45		1 / 45	
