= 2003 Asturian regional election =

Election in the Spanish region of Asturias

- 25 May 2003

All 45 seats in the General Junta of the Principality of Asturias 23 seats needed for a majority
- Opinion polls
- Registered: 976,104 ▼0.4%
- Turnout: 623,149 (63.8%) ▲0.2 pp
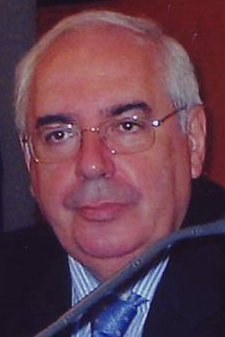

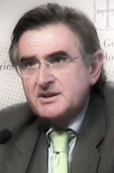

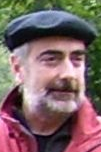
	First party	Second party	Third party
Leader	Vicente Álvarez Areces	Ovidio Sánchez	Francisco Javier García Valledor
Party	PSOE	PP	IU–BA
Leader since	14 June 1998	9 December 1998	April 2000
Leader's seat	Central	Central	Central
Last election	24 seats, 46.0%	15 seats, 32.3%	3 seats, 9.0%
Seats won	22	19	4
Seat change	▼2	▲4	▲1
Popular vote	250,474	242,396	68,360
Percentage	40.5%	39.2%	11.0%
Swing	▼5.5 pp	▲6.9 pp	▲2.0 pp
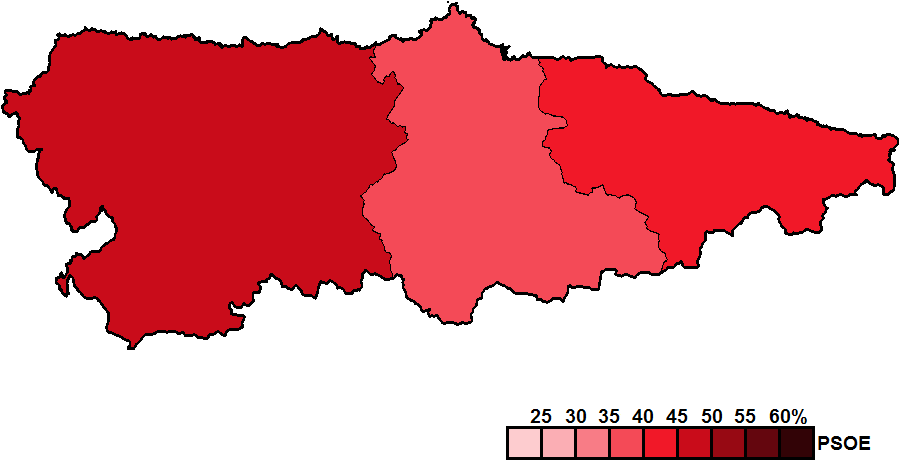
- Constituency results map for the General Junta of the Principality of Asturias
President before election
Vicente Álvarez Areces
PSOE
Elected President
Vicente Álvarez Areces
PSOE

The 2003 Asturian regional election was held on 25 May 2003 to elect the 6th General Junta of the Principality of Asturias. All 45 seats in the General Junta were up for election. It was held concurrently with regional elections in twelve other autonomous communities and local elections all throughout Spain.

== Overview ==
=== Electoral system ===
The General Junta of the Principality of Asturias was the devolved, unicameral legislature of the autonomous community of Asturias, having legislative power in regional matters as defined by the Spanish Constitution and the Asturian Statute of Autonomy, as well as the ability to vote confidence in or withdraw it from a regional president.

Voting for the General Junta was on the basis of universal suffrage, which comprised all nationals over 18 years of age, registered in Asturias and in full enjoyment of their political rights. The 45 members of the General Junta of the Principality of Asturias were elected using the D'Hondt method and a closed list proportional representation, with an electoral threshold of three percent of valid votes—which included blank ballots—being applied in each constituency. Seats were allocated to constituencies, which were established by law as follows:

- Central District, comprising the municipalities of Aller, Avilés, Bimenes, Carreño, Caso, Castrillón, Corvera de Asturias, Gijón, Gozón, Illas, Las Regueras, Langreo, Laviana, Lena, Llanera, Mieres, Morcín, Noreña, Oviedo, Proaza, Quirós, Ribera de Arriba, Riosa, San Martín del Rey Aurelio, Santo Adriano, Sariego, Siero, Sobrescobio and Soto del Barco.
- Eastern District, comprising the municipalities of Amieva, Cabrales, Cabranes, Cangas de Onís, Caravia, Colunga, Llanes, Nava, Onís, Parres, Peñamellera Alta, Peñamellera Baja, Piloña, Ponga, Ribadedeva, Ribadesella and Villaviciosa.
- Western District, comprising the municipalities of Allande, Belmonte de Miranda, Boal, Candamo, Cangas del Narcea, Castropol, Coaña, Cudillero, Degaña, El Franco, Grado, Grandas de Salime, Ibias, Illano, Muros de Nalón, Navia, Pesoz, Pravia, Salas, San Martín de Oscos, Santa Eulalia de Oscos, San Tirso de Abres, Somiedo, Tapia de Casariego, Taramundi, Teverga, Tineo, Valdés, Vegadeo, Villanueva de Oscos, Villayón and Yernes y Tameza.

Each constituency was allocated an initial minimum of two seats, with the remaining 39 being distributed in proportion to their populations.

In smaller constituencies, the use of the electoral method resulted in an effective threshold based on the district magnitude and the distribution of votes among candidacies.

The electoral law allowed for parties and federations registered in the interior ministry, coalitions and groupings of electors to present lists of candidates. Parties and federations intending to form a coalition ahead of an election were required to inform the relevant Electoral Commission within ten days of the election call, whereas groupings of electors needed to secure the signature of at least one percent of the electorate in the constituencies for which they sought election, disallowing electors from signing for more than one list of candidates.

=== Election date ===
The term of the General Junta of the Principality of Asturias expired four years after the date of its previous election. Elections to the General Junta were fixed for the fourth Sunday of May every four years. The previous election was held on 13 June 1999, setting the election date for the General Junta on 25 May 2003.

The president had the prerogative to dissolve the General Junta and call a snap election, provided that no motion of no confidence was in process, no nationwide election was due and some time requirements were met: namely, that dissolution did not occur either during the first legislative session or within the legislature's last year ahead of its scheduled expiry, nor before one year had elapsed since a previous dissolution under this procedure. In the event of an investiture process failing to elect a regional president within a two-month period from the first ballot, the General Junta was to be automatically dissolved and a fresh election called. Any snap election held as a result of these circumstances would not alter the period to the next ordinary election, with elected lawmakers serving the remainder of its original four-year term.

== Opinion polls ==
The table below lists voting intention estimates in reverse chronological order, showing the most recent first and using the dates when the survey fieldwork was done, as opposed to the date of publication. Where the fieldwork dates are unknown, the date of publication is given instead. The highest percentage figure in each polling survey is displayed with its background shaded in the leading party's colour. If a tie ensues, this is applied to the figures with the highest percentages. The "Lead" column on the right shows the percentage-point difference between the parties with the highest percentages in a poll. When available, seat projections determined by the polling organisations are displayed below (or in place of) the percentages in a smaller font; 23 seats were required for an absolute majority in the General Junta of the Principality of Asturias.

Color key:

Exit poll

Polling firm/Commissioner	Fieldwork date	Sample size	Turnout	PSOE	PP	IU	URAS	PAS	Lead
2003 regional election	25 May 2003	—N/a	63.8	40.5; 22	39.2; 19	11.0; 4	2.8; 0	1.8; 0	1.3
Sigma Dos/Antena 3	25 May 2003	?	?	? 21/22	? 18	? 4/5	–	–	?
Ipsos–Eco/RTVE	25 May 2003	?	?	? 22/24	? 16/18	? 5/6	–	–	?
InvesMark/El Comercio (Note: Undecided and/or abstentionists excluded.)	2–8 May 2003	1,600	61.5	48.6; 24/25	30.8; 15/16	9.6; 3/4	4.9; 1	2.4; 0/1	17.8
CIS	22 Mar–28 Apr 2003	1,287	73.0	45.7; 24	30.7; 16	11.2; 4	4.8; 1	–	15.0
Vox Pública/El Periódico	23–24 Apr 2003	802	?	48.0– 49.0; 25/26	28.5– 29.5; 14/15	? 3/4	? 2	–	19.5
CIS	9 Sep–9 Oct 2002	493	72.0	45.8	31.5	9.7	1.0	–	14.3
2000 general election	12 Mar 2000	—N/a	67.0	37.0	46.3	10.3	2.0	0.9	9.3
1999 regional election	13 Jun 1999	—N/a	63.6	46.0; 24	32.3; 15	9.0; 3	7.1; 3	2.6; 0	13.7

== Results ==
=== Overall ===
← Summary of the 25 May 2003 General Junta of the Principality of Asturias election results →
Parties and alliances	Popular vote			Seats	
Parties and alliances	Votes	%	±pp	Total	+/−
Spanish Socialist Workers' Party (PSOE)	250,474	40.48	−5.52	22	−2
People's Party (PP)	242,396	39.18	+6.87	19	+4
United Left–Bloc for Asturias (IU–BA)	68,360	11.05	+2.05	4	+1
Asturian Renewal Union (URAS)	17,552	2.84	−4.30	0	−3
Asturianist Party (PAS)	11,376	1.84	−0.74	0	±0
The Greens–Green Left of Asturias (LV–IVA)	6,561	1.06	+0.52	0	±0
Andecha Astur (AA)	3,821	0.62	+0.26	0	±0
Senior Defense Platform (PlaDeTE)	1,297	0.21	New	0	±0
Communist Party of the Peoples of Spain (PCPE)^{1}	1,211	0.20	−0.02	0	±0
Democratic and Social Centre (CDS)	642	0.10	−0.02	0	±0
Asturian Council (Conceyu)	524	0.08	±0.00	0	±0
Asturian Democratic Convergence (CDAS)	359	0.06	New	0	±0
Blank ballots	14,143	2.29	+0.72		
Total	618,716			45	±0
Valid votes	618,716	99.29	−0.11		
Invalid votes	4,433	0.71	+0.11		
Votes cast / turnout	623,149	63.84	+0.22		
Abstentions	352,955	36.16	−0.22		
Registered voters	976,104				
Sources
Footnotes: ^{1} Communist Party of the Peoples of Spain results are compared to Asturian Left Bloc totals in the 1999 election.

Popular vote
PSOE	40.48%
PP	39.18%
IU–BA	11.05%
URAS	2.84%
PAS	1.84%
LV–IVA	1.06%
Others	1.27%
Blank ballots	2.29%

Seats
PSOE	48.89%
PP	42.22%
IU–BA	8.89%

=== Distribution by constituency ===
Constituency	PSOE		PP		IU–BA	
Constituency	%	S	%	S	%	S
Central	39.3	15	38.9	14	12.4	4
Eastern	43.7	3	43.0	2	5.1	−
Western	45.5	4	38.4	3	7.1	−
Total	40.5	22	39.2	19	11.0	4

== Aftermath ==
Investiture
Ballot →	4 July 2003	
Required majority →	23 out of 45	
Vicente Álvarez Areces (PSOE): • PSOE (22); • IU–BA (4)	26 / 45	check
Abstentions: • PP (19)	19 / 45	
Absentees	0 / 45	
