= 1999 Asturian regional election =

Election in the Spanish region of Asturias

- 13 June 1999

All 45 seats in the General Junta of the Principality of Asturias 23 seats needed for a majority
- Opinion polls
- Registered: 979,618 ▲3.7%
- Turnout: 623,242 (63.6%) ▼5.5 pp
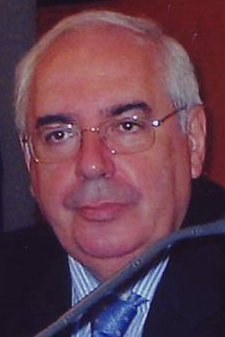

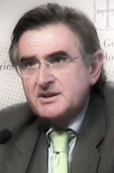

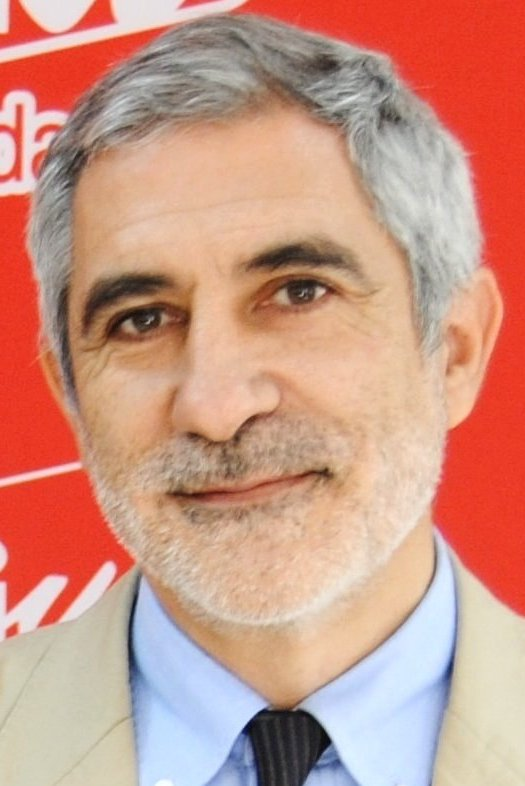

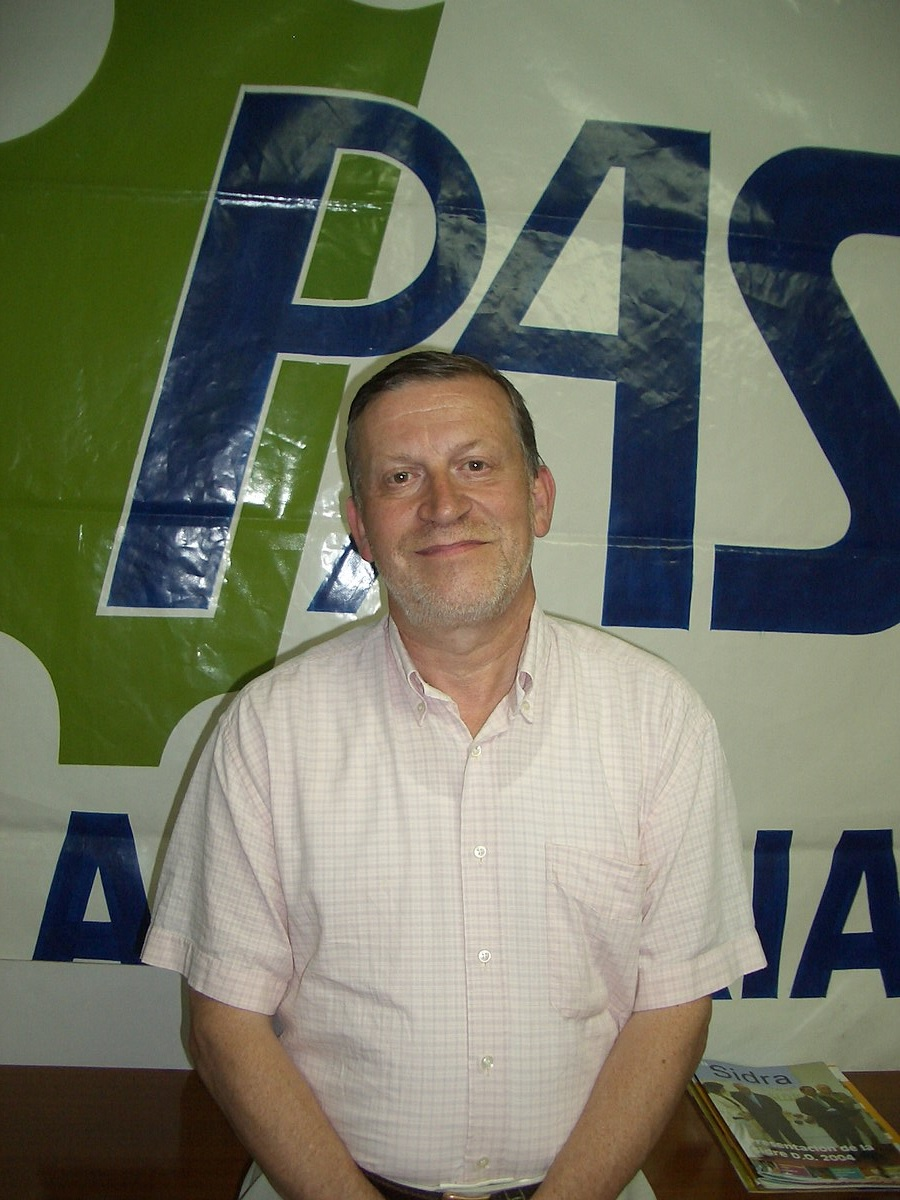
| | First party | Second party | Third party |
|---|---|---|---|
| Leader | Vicente Álvarez Areces | Ovidio Sánchez | Gaspar Llamazares |
| Party | PSOE | PP | IU |
| Leader since | 14 June 1998 | 9 December 1998 | 1991 |
| Leader's seat | Central | Central | Central |
| Last election | 17 seats, 33.8% | 21 seats, 42.0% | 6 seats, 16.4% |
| Seats won | 24 | 15 | 3 |
| Seat change | ▲7 | ▼6 | ▼3 |
| Popular vote | 284,972 | 200,164 | 55,747 |
| Percentage | 46.0% | 32.3% | 9.0% |
| Swing | ▲12.2 pp | ▼9.7 pp | ▼7.4 pp |
| | Fourth party | Fifth party |
| Leader | Sergio Marqués | Xuan Xosé Sánchez Vicente |
| Party | URAS | PAS |
| Leader since | 2 December 1998 | 1985 |
| Leader's seat | Central | Central (lost) |
| Last election | Did not contest | 1 seat, 3.2% |
| Seats won | 3 | 0 |
| Seat change | ▲3 | ▼1 |
| Popular vote | 44,261 | 15,998 |
| Percentage | 7.1% | 2.6% |
| Swing | New party | ▼0.6 pp |
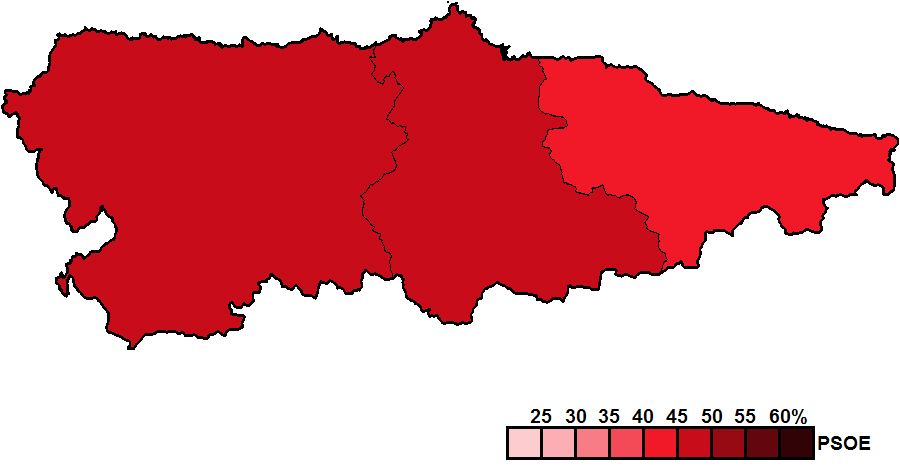
- Constituency results map for the General Junta of the Principality of Asturias
President before election
Sergio Marqués
URAS
Elected President
Vicente Álvarez Areces
PSOE

The 1999 Asturian regional election was held on 13 June 1999 to elect the 5th General Junta of the Principality of Asturias. All 45 seats in the General Junta were up for election. It was held concurrently with regional elections in twelve other autonomous communities and local elections all throughout Spain, as well as the 1999 European Parliament election.

An internal People's Party (PP) crisis starting in 1997 between the regional PP leadership and President Sergio Marqués resulted in a party split, with Marqués' government breaking away from the PP in 1998, maintaining the support of only 5 of the 21 PP deputies for the remainder of the legislature.

As a result of the ensuing political crisis, the Spanish Socialist Workers' Party (PSOE) of Vicente Álvarez Areces went on to win an absolute majority of seats, at the cost of the greatly weakened PP. United Left (IU) also suffered from the party crisis at the national level and lost half of its support, while Sergio Marqués' party, the Asturian Renewal Union (URAS), entered parliament with 3 seats.

== Overview ==
=== Electoral system ===
The General Junta of the Principality of Asturias was the devolved, unicameral legislature of the autonomous community of Asturias, having legislative power in regional matters as defined by the Spanish Constitution and the Asturian Statute of Autonomy, as well as the ability to vote confidence in or withdraw it from a regional president.

Voting for the General Junta was on the basis of universal suffrage, which comprised all nationals over 18 years of age, registered in Asturias and in full enjoyment of their political rights. The 45 members of the General Junta of the Principality of Asturias were elected using the D'Hondt method and a closed list proportional representation, with an electoral threshold of three percent of valid votes—which included blank ballots—being applied in each constituency. Seats were allocated to constituencies, which were established by law as follows:

- Central District, comprising the municipalities of Aller, Avilés, Bimenes, Carreño, Caso, Castrillón, Corvera de Asturias, Gijón, Gozón, Illas, Las Regueras, Langreo, Laviana, Lena, Llanera, Mieres, Morcín, Noreña, Oviedo, Proaza, Quirós, Ribera de Arriba, Riosa, San Martín del Rey Aurelio, Santo Adriano, Sariego, Siero, Sobrescobio and Soto del Barco.
- Eastern District, comprising the municipalities of Amieva, Cabrales, Cabranes, Cangas de Onís, Caravia, Colunga, Llanes, Nava, Onís, Parres, Peñamellera Alta, Peñamellera Baja, Piloña, Ponga, Ribadedeva, Ribadesella and Villaviciosa.
- Western District, comprising the municipalities of Allande, Belmonte de Miranda, Boal, Candamo, Cangas del Narcea, Castropol, Coaña, Cudillero, Degaña, El Franco, Grado, Grandas de Salime, Ibias, Illano, Muros de Nalón, Navia, Pesoz, Pravia, Salas, San Martín de Oscos, Santa Eulalia de Oscos, San Tirso de Abres, Somiedo, Tapia de Casariego, Taramundi, Teverga, Tineo, Valdés, Vegadeo, Villanueva de Oscos, Villayón and Yernes y Tameza.

Each constituency was allocated an initial minimum of two seats, with the remaining 39 being distributed in proportion to their populations.

In smaller constituencies, the use of the electoral method resulted in an effective threshold based on the district magnitude and the distribution of votes among candidacies.

The electoral law allowed for parties and federations registered in the interior ministry, coalitions and groupings of electors to present lists of candidates. Parties and federations intending to form a coalition ahead of an election were required to inform the relevant Electoral Commission within ten days of the election call, whereas groupings of electors needed to secure the signature of at least one percent of the electorate in the constituencies for which they sought election, disallowing electors from signing for more than one list of candidates.

=== Election date ===
The term of the General Junta of the Principality of Asturias expired four years after the date of its previous election. Elections to the General Junta were fixed for the fourth Sunday of May every four years. Legal amendments introduced in 1998 allowed for these to be held together with European Parliament elections, provided that they were scheduled for within a four month-timespan. The previous election was held on 28 May 1995, setting the election date for the General Junta concurrently with a European Parliament election on 13 June 1999.

After legal amendments earlier in 1999, the president was granted the prerogative to dissolve the General Junta and call a snap election, provided that no motion of no confidence was in process, no nationwide election was due and some time requirements were met: namely, that dissolution did not occur either during the first legislative session or within the legislature's last year ahead of its scheduled expiry, nor before one year had elapsed since a previous dissolution under this procedure. In the event of an investiture process failing to elect a regional president within a two-month period from the first ballot, the General Junta was to be automatically dissolved and a fresh election called. Any snap election held as a result of these circumstances would not alter the period to the next ordinary election, with elected lawmakers serving the remainder of its original four-year term.

== Opinion polls ==
The table below lists voting intention estimates in reverse chronological order, showing the most recent first and using the dates when the survey fieldwork was done, as opposed to the date of publication. Where the fieldwork dates are unknown, the date of publication is given instead. The highest percentage figure in each polling survey is displayed with its background shaded in the leading party's colour. If a tie ensues, this is applied to the figures with the highest percentages. The "Lead" column on the right shows the percentage-point difference between the parties with the highest percentages in a poll. When available, seat projections determined by the polling organisations are displayed below (or in place of) the percentages in a smaller font; 23 seats were required for an absolute majority in the General Junta of the Principality of Asturias.

| Polling firm/Commissioner | Fieldwork date | Sample size | Turnout | PP | PSOE | IU | PAS | URAS | Lead |
|---|---|---|---|---|---|---|---|---|---|
| 1999 regional election | 13 Jun 1999 | —N/a | 63.6 | 32.3; 15 | 46.0; 24 | 9.0; 3 | 2.6; 0 | 7.1; 3 | 13.7 |
| Eco Consulting/ABC | 24 May–2 Jun 1999 | ? | ? | 38.1; 18/19 | 34.6; 19/20 | 14.4; 5/6 | 4.8; 1 | 4.6; 1 | 3.5 |
| Demoscopia/El País | 26 May–1 Jun 1999 | ? | 67 | 36.0; 17 | 41.3; 21 | 12.3; 4 | 3.7; 2 | 4.0; 1 | 5.3 |
| Sigma Dos/El Mundo | 19–26 May 1999 | 600 | ? | 39.6; 19/20 | 41.2; 20/22 | 8.4; 3 | 2.7; 0/1 | 3.6; 1 | 1.6 |
| CIS | 3–23 May 1999 | 1,057 | 67.6 | 31.9; 15/16 | 39.3; 19/20 | 13.6; 5 | 4.6; 1/2 | 8.4; 3/4 | 7.4 |
| La Voz de Asturias | 16 May 1999 | ? | ? | ? 17/19 | ? 17/19 | ? 6/7 | ? 1/2 | ? 1 | Tie |
| El Comercio | 19 Jul 1998 | ? | ? | 31.5; 14 | 40.1; 23 | – | – | ? 2 | 8.6 |
| 1996 general election | 3 Mar 1996 | —N/a | 75.9 | 41.0 | 39.9 | 15.5 | 1.7 | – | 1.1 |
| 1995 regional election | 28 May 1995 | —N/a | 69.1 | 42.0; 21 | 33.8; 17 | 16.4; 6 | 3.2; 1 | – | 8.2 |

== Results ==
=== Overall ===
← Summary of the 13 June 1999 General Junta of the Principality of Asturias election results →
| Parties and alliances | Popular vote | | | Seats | |
| Parties and alliances | Votes | % | ±pp | Total | +/− |
|---|---|---|---|---|---|
| Spanish Socialist Workers' Party (PSOE) | 284,972 | 46.00 | +12.17 | 24 | +7 |
| People's Party (PP) | 200,164 | 32.31 | −9.69 | 15 | −6 |
| United Left of Asturias (IU) | 55,747 | 9.00 | −7.42 | 3 | −3 |
| Asturian Renewal Union (URAS) | 44,261 | 7.14 | New | 3 | +3 |
| Asturianist Party (PAS) | 15,998 | 2.58 | −0.61 | 0 | −1 |
| The Greens of Asturias (LV) | 3,343 | 0.54 | −0.15 | 0 | ±0 |
| Andecha Astur (AA) | 2,206 | 0.36 | +0.06 | 0 | ±0 |
| Asturian Left Bloc (BIA)^{1} | 1,366 | 0.22 | +0.05 | 0 | ±0 |
| Centrist Union–Democratic and Social Centre (UC–CDS) | 737 | 0.12 | −1.66 | 0 | ±0 |
| Asturian Council (Conceyu) | 496 | 0.08 | −0.05 | 0 | ±0 |
| The Phalanx (FE) | 453 | 0.07 | New | 0 | ±0 |
| Humanist Party (PH) | 23 | 0.00 | New | 0 | ±0 |
| Blank ballots | 9,720 | 1.57 | +0.39 | | |
| Total | 619,486 | | | 45 | ±0 |
| Valid votes | 619,486 | 99.40 | −0.01 | | |
| Invalid votes | 3,756 | 0.60 | +0.01 | | |
| Votes cast / turnout | 623,242 | 63.62 | −5.43 | | |
| Abstentions | 356,376 | 36.38 | +5.43 | | |
| Registered voters | 979,618 | | | | |
Sources
Footnotes: ^{1} Asturian Left Bloc results are compared to Communist Party of the Peoples of Spain totals in the 1995 election.

Popular vote
| PSOE | 46.00% |
| PP | 32.31% |
| IU | 9.00% |
| URAS | 7.14% |
| PAS | 2.58% |
| Others | 1.39% |
| Blank ballots | 1.57% |

Seats
| PSOE | 53.33% |
| PP | 33.33% |
| IU | 6.67% |
| URAS | 6.67% |

=== Distribution by constituency ===
| Constituency | PSOE | | PP | | IU | | URAS | |
| Constituency | % | S | % | S | % | S | % | S |
|---|---|---|---|---|---|---|---|---|
| Central | 46.3 | 17 | 31.7 | 11 | 10.2 | 3 | 5.9 | 2 |
| Eastern | 44.2 | 3 | 37.0 | 2 | 3.9 | − | 9.5 | − |
| Western | 45.3 | 4 | 32.9 | 2 | 4.9 | − | 13.1 | 1 |
| Total | 46.0 | 24 | 32.3 | 15 | 9.0 | 3 | 7.1 | 3 |

== Aftermath ==
Investiture
| Ballot → | 22 July 1999 | |
| Required majority → | 23 out of 45 | |
| Vicente Álvarez Areces (PSOE): • PSOE (24) | 24 / 45 | check |
| Abstentions: • PP (15); • IU (3); • URAS (2) | 20 / 45 | |
| Absentees: • URAS (1) | 1 / 45 | |
