= Asturian Renewal Union =

Asturian Renewal Union Unión Renovadora Asturiana
- Leader: Javier López Alonso
- Founded: 15 December 1998
- Headquarters: Oviedo, Spain
- Ideology: Asturian regionalism Conservatism; Christian democracy
- Political position: Centre-right
- Local Government: 2 / 946

Website
- uras.es

Asturian Renewal Union (Asturian: Unión Renovadora Asturiana, URAS) is a regionalist political party from Asturias, Spain, founded in December 1998 by Sergio Marqués, after leaving the People's Party (PP) when he was President of the Principality of Asturias.

== History ==
After being founded in 1998 by people who left PP and Asturianists, URAS contested the Asturian parliamentary election, 1999 achieving only three seats in the General Junta.

For the 2007 election, URAS took part in a coalition with Partíu Asturianista called Asturianist Union. Sergio Marqués left the presidency of the party after the election, being replaced by Javier López Alonso.

== Election results ==
General Junta of the Principality of Asturias
Election	Seats won	±	Size	# of votes	%	Government	Leader
1999	3 / 45	▲3	4th	44,261	7.1%	Opposition	Sergio Marqués
2003	0 / 45	▼3	4th	17,552	2.8%	No Seats	Sergio Marqués
2007	0 / 45	±0	4th	13,314^{1}	2.2%	No Seats	Sergio Marqués
2011	0 / 45	±0	10th	2,953^{1}	0.5%	No Seats	Javier López Alonso
2012	0 / 45	±0	13th	454	0.1%	No Seats	Javier López Alonso
2015	0 / 45	±0	17th	245^{2}	0.04%	No Seats	José Manuel Suárez Mata

^{1} Joint list with Asturianist Party.
^{2} Only took part in the Western district.
