= United Left of Asturias =

United Left of Asturias Izquierda Xunida d'Asturies
- General Coordinator: Ovidio Zapico
- Founded: 1993
- Merger of: Communist Party of Asturias; Izquierda Abierta; Communist Youth of Asturias; Republican Left; Independents; Lliberación(1991-2010); Party of Socialist Action (1986-2001); Progressive Federation (1986-1988); Carlist Party of Asturias (1986-1987); Humanist Party (1986)
- Headquarters: Plaza Alfonso II el Casto 3, 2º Oviedo, Asturias
- Youth wing: IU Mocedá
- Membership (2014): 2,300 official members and 2,100 sympathizers
- Ideology: Socialism; Anticapitalism; Communism; Republicanism; Asturianism; Feminism; Federalism
- Political position: Left-wing
- National affiliation: United Left
- Regional affiliation: Convocatoria por Asturias (since 2023)
- General Junta: 2 / 45
- Mayors: 9 / 78
- Local seats (Note: Not including those gained in coalitions with Podemos Asturias or Compromisu por Asturies.): 119 / 928

Website
- izquierdaxunida.com

United Left of Asturias (Asturian: Izquierda Xunida d'Asturies, Spanish: Izquierda Unida de Asturias. IU–IX) is the Asturian federation of the Spanish left wing political and social movement United Left. Ovidio Zapico is the current General Coordinator. The Communist Party of Asturias (PCA, Asturian federation of PCE) is the major member of the coalition.

It has 2 deputies in the Assembly of the Principality.Asturias was the autonomy were IU achieved the best results in the general elections of 2011, with the 13.27% of the vote. For the 2023 regional elections, IU took part in the Convocatoria por Asturies coalition (among Más País and IAS). Since 2023 it has also participated in a regional coalition government (PSOE-IU) with Ovidio Zapico serving as minister for Territorial and Urban Planning, Housing and Citizen's Rights.

== Electoral performance ==
=== General Junta of the Principality of Asturias ===
Election	Votes			Seats			Status in legislature	
Election	#	%	±pp	#	±	Size	Status	Period
1987	69,175	12.1%	+1.0	4 / 45	1	4th	Opposition	1987–1991
1991	78,982	14.8%	+2.7	6 / 45	2	3rd	Confidence and supply	1991–1993
1991	78,982	14.8%	+2.7	6 / 45	2	3rd		1993–2003
1995	106,538	16.4%	+1.6	6 / 45	0	3rd	Opposition	1993–2003
1999	55,747	9.0%	–7.4	3 / 45	3	3rd	Opposition	1993–2003
2003^{a}	68,360	11.0%	+2.0	4 / 45	1	3rd	Government	2003–2007
2007^{b}	58,144	9.7%	–1.3	4 / 45	0	3rd	Opposition	2007–2008
2007^{b}	58,144	9.7%	–1.3	4 / 45	0	3rd	Government	2008–2011
2011^{c}	61,703	10.3%	+0.6	4 / 45	0	4th	Opposition	2011–2012
2012	69,118	13.8%	+3.5	5 / 45	1	4th	Confidence and supply	2012–2013
2012	69,118	13.8%	+3.5	5 / 45	1	4th	Opposition	2013–2015
2015	64,868	11.9%	–1.9	5 / 45	0	4th	Confidence and supply	2015–2019
2019^{d}	34,776	6.6%	–5.3	2 / 45	3	5th	Opposition	2019–2023
2023^{e}	40,774	7.6%	+1.0	3 / 45	0	4th	Government	2023–
^{(a)} In coalition with Bloc for Asturias.^{(b)} In coalition with Bloc for Asturias and The Greens of Asturias.^{(c)} In coalition with The Greens of Asturias.^{(d)} In coalition with Asturian Left.^{(e)} In coalition with Asturian Left and More Asturias (Convocatoria por Asturias).
