= People's Party of Asturias =

People's Party of Asturias Partido Popular de Asturias
- President: Teresa Mallada
- Founded: 1989
- Headquarters: C/ Manuel Pedregal, 11; Oviedo, Asturias
- Membership (2018): ~18,000 (~2,000 active membres)
- Ideology: Christian democracy Conservatism
- Political position: Centre-right to right-wing
- National affiliation: People's Party
- Asturias General Junta: 17 / 45
- Congress of Deputies: 3 / 7 (Asturian seats)
- Spanish Senate: 2 / 6 (Asturian seats)
- Mayors: 10 / 78
- Local seats: 275 / 922

Website
- www.pp-asturias.com

The People's Party of Asturias (Spanish: Partido Popular de Asturias, PP; Asturian: Partíu Popular d'Asturies) is the regional section of the People's Party of Spain (PP) in the Principality of Asturias. It was formed in 1989 from the re-foundation of the People's Alliance.

== Electoral performance ==
=== General Junta of the Principality of Asturias ===
General Junta of the Principality of Asturias
Election	Vote	%	Score	Seats	+/–	Leader	Status in legislature	
Election	Vote	%	Score	Seats	+/–	Leader	Status	Period
1991	161,703	30.40%	2nd	15 / 45	2 (Note: Compared to People's Alliance totals in the 1987 regional election.)	Isidro Fernández	Opposition	1991–1995
1995	272,495	42.00%	1st	21 / 45	6	Sergio Marqués	Minority government	1995–1998
1995	272,495	42.00%	1st	21 / 45	6	Sergio Marqués	Opposition	1998–present
1999	200,164	32.31%	2nd	15 / 45	6	Ovidio Sánchez	Opposition	1998–present
2003	242,396	39.18%	2nd	19 / 45	4	Ovidio Sánchez	Opposition	1998–present
2007	248,907	41.50%	2nd	20 / 45	1	Ovidio Sánchez	Opposition	1998–present
2011	119,767	19.95%	3rd	10 / 45	10	Isabel Pérez-Espinosa	Opposition	1998–present
2012	108,091	21.53%	3rd	10 / 45	0	Mercedes Fernández	Opposition	1998–present
2015	117,319	21.59%	2nd	11 / 45	1	Mercedes Fernández	Opposition	1998–present
2019	93,147	17.52%	2nd	10 / 45	1	Teresa Mallada	Opposition	1998–present
2023	170,331	32.66%	2nd	17 / 45	7	Diego Canga	Opposition	1998–present

=== Cortes Generales ===
Cortes Generales
Election	Asturias						
Election	Congress					Senate	
Election	Vote	%	Score	Seats	+/–	Seats	+/–
1989	162,590	26.53%	2nd	3 / 9	1 (Note: Compared to People's Coalition totals in the 1986 general election.)	1 / 4	0
1993	258,355	37.37%	2nd	4 / 9	1	1 / 4	0
1996	297,079	41.03%	1st	4 / 9	0	3 / 4	2
2000	302,626	46.33%	1st	5 / 9	1	3 / 4	0
2004	307,977	43.77%	1st	4 / 8	1	3 / 4	0
2008	289,305	41.58%	2nd	4 / 8	0	1 / 4	2
2011	223,906	35.40%	1st	3 / 8	1	3 / 4	2
2015 (Note: Electoral alliance with Asturias Forum.)	187,568	30.11%	1st	3 / 8	0	3 / 4	0
2016	209,632	35.25%	1st	3 / 8	0	3 / 4	0
2019 (Apr)	112,180	17.90%	2nd	1 / 7	2	1 / 4	2
2019 (Nov)	128,698	23.24%	2nd	2 / 7	1	1 / 4	0

=== European Parliament ===
European Parliament
Election	Asturias		
Election	Vote	%	Score
1989	107,443	22.55%	2nd
1994	231,151	42.60%	1st
1999	243,576	39.43%	2nd
2004	195,972	44.37%	2nd
2009	180,936	42.00%	2nd
2014	91,909	24.21%	2nd
2019	99,005	19.04%	2nd
