= Partíu Asturianista =

- Secretary-General: Xesús Cañedo Valle
- Founder: Xuan Xosé Sánchez Vicente; Xesús Cañedo; Carlos Rubiera
- Founded: 1985
- Headquarters: 34 El Riberu Street; Avilés, Asturias
- Newspaper: L'Asturianista
- Youth wing: Xuventú Asturianista
- Ideology: Social democracy Asturian nationalism
- Political position: Centre-left
- Local Government: 3 / 946

Website
- www.asturianista.es

Partíu Asturianista (PAS) is a nationalist political party from Asturias, Spain, founded in 1985 by Xuan Xosé Sánchez Vicente, Xesús Cañedo, and Carlos Rubiera.

== Ideology ==
A social democratic political party, the PAS bases its Asturian nationalist ideology on Asturian history, defining Asturias as an "old European nation" rooted in the Kingdom of Asturias, which has its own culture, traditions and Asturian language.

The defense of Asturian language plays a pivotal role in the ideology of the party.

== History ==
After leaving the Spanish Socialist Workers' Party in 1983, X. X. Sánchez Vicente founded the Partíu Asturianista, which was officially legalised in 1985. Among the primary political targets of the party was a reform of the Asturian Statute of Autonomy, in which Asturias would be recognised as a Historical Nationality, the Asturian language would be granted official status (together with Spanish language), a statute that would guarantee the highest self-government possibilities recognized in the Spanish Constitution of 1978.

In 1988, the party held its first National Conference, where the founding program is approved. The PAS decides then to take part in that year's regional elections, which finally placed the Partíu Asturianista as the fifth political power of Asturias. The PAS also ran for the European Parliament elections of 1989, being included in a coalition of nationalist parties from all Spain.

During the first National Congress of 1991 the party approves the Documentu d'Ideoloxía y Estratexa (Document of Ideology and Political Strategy) and decides to form an electoral coalition with UNA, another Asturian nationalist party. In the elections of the 25 May 1991, PAS won one seat for Sánchez Vicente in the Asturian Parliament and five seats in five different municipalities. This was the first time an Asturian nationalist party got a member in the Parliament since the transition to democracy. A seat in the Parliament was obtained again in the elections of 1995, when the PAS also won the Mayor elections in Nava.

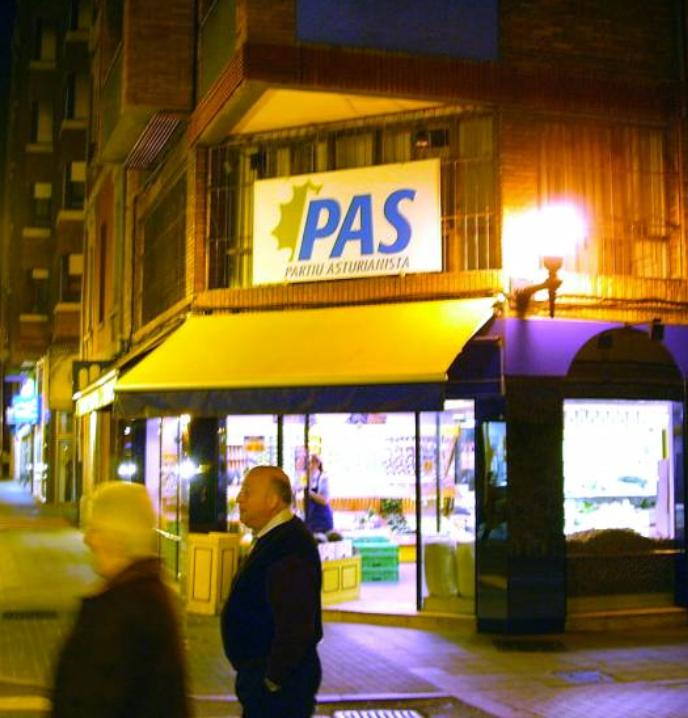
Old house of the party in Gijón

Partíu Asturianista supported the Sergio Marqués Government of the Principality of Asturias from 1997 to 1999. As a result of this cooperation, the Llei d'Usu y Promoción de l'Asturianu (Law of Promotion and Use of Asturian language) was approved, a law considered to be a prerequisite towards the future official status of Asturian and one of the biggest achievements in the history of the party.

During the 2nd and 3rd National Congresses, held in 1994 and 1998 respectively, the party approves important documents like the Ponencia d'Empobinamientu Políticu (Report on Political Guideline) and other future political strategies.

== Present ==
PAS has been out of the Asturian Parliament from 1999. The organization took part in the regional elections of 2007 in coalition with URAS, both forming the Unión Asturianista (Asturianist Union), and currently the coalition has several mayors in various Asturian municipalities.
