= 2011 Spanish local elections in Asturias =

This article presents the results breakdown of the local elections held in Asturias on 22 May 2011. The following tables show detailed results in the autonomous community's most populous municipalities, sorted alphabetically.

== City control ==
The following table lists party control in the most populous municipalities, including provincial capitals (shown in bold). Gains for a party are displayed with the cell's background shaded in that party's colour.

Municipality	Population	Previous control	New control
Avilés	84,202	Spanish Socialist Workers' Party (PSOE)	Spanish Socialist Workers' Party (PSOE)
Gijón	277,198	Spanish Socialist Workers' Party (PSOE)	Forum of Citizens (FAC)
Langreo	45,397	Spanish Socialist Workers' Party (PSOE)	Spanish Socialist Workers' Party (PSOE)
Mieres	43,688	Spanish Socialist Workers' Party (PSOE)	United Left of Asturias–The Greens (IU–LV)
**Oviedo**	225,155	People's Party (PP)	People's Party (PP)
San Martín del Rey Aurelio	18,549	Spanish Socialist Workers' Party (PSOE)	Spanish Socialist Workers' Party (PSOE)
Siero	51,730	Spanish Socialist Workers' Party (PSOE)	Spanish Socialist Workers' Party (PSOE)

== Municipalities ==
=== Avilés ===
Population: 84,202

← Summary of the 22 May 2011 City Council of Avilés election results →
Parties and alliances	Popular vote			Seats	
Parties and alliances	Votes	%	±pp	Total	+/−
Spanish Socialist Workers' Party (PSOE)	14,864	33.84	−6.98	10	−1
Forum of Citizens (FAC)	9,398	21.40	New	6	+6
People's Party (PP)	9,201	20.95	−9.87	6	−2
United Left of Asturias–The Greens (IU–LV)	5,222	11.89	+2.51	3	+1
Union, Progress and Democracy (UPyD)	1,367	3.11	New	0	±0
Independent Social Group of Avilés (ASIA)	1,358	3.09	−10.61	0	−4
The Greens–Green Group (LV–GV)	417	0.95	New	0	±0
Bloc for Asturias–Asturian Nationalist Unity: Commitment for Asturias (BA–UNA)	316	0.72	New	0	±0
Communist Party of the Peoples of Spain (PCPE)	202	0.46	+0.11	0	±0
Asturian Renewal Union–Asturianist Party (URAS–PAS)	187	0.43	−1.19	0	±0
National Front–Republican Social Movement (FrN–MSR)	85	0.19	New	0	±0
Blank ballots	1,304	2.97	+0.78		
Total	43,921			25	±0
Valid votes	43,921	98.59	−0.96		
Invalid votes	628	1.41	+0.96		
Votes cast / turnout	44,549	64.20	+4.40		
Abstentions	24,846	35.80	−4.40		
Registered voters	69,395				

=== Gijón ===
Population: 277,198

← Summary of the 22 May 2011 City Council of Gijón election results →
Parties and alliances	Popular vote			Seats	
Parties and alliances	Votes	%	±pp	Total	+/−
Spanish Socialist Workers' Party (PSOE)	47,583	31.59	−12.86	10	−3
Forum of Citizens (FAC)	42,590	28.27	New	9	+9
People's Party (PP)	28,326	18.80	−21.67	5	−7
United Left of Asturias–The Greens (IU–LV)	15,877	10.54	+1.72	3	+1
Union, Progress and Democracy (UPyD)	6,154	4.09	New	0	±0
The Greens–Green Group (LV–GV)	1,329	0.88	New	0	±0
Bloc for Asturias–Asturian Nationalist Unity: Commitment for Asturias (BA–UNA)	1,315	0.87	New	0	±0
Independents of Asturias (IDEAS)	854	0.57	New	0	±0
Popular Unity Council of Gijón (CUPX)	727	0.48	New	0	±0
Asturian Renewal Union–Asturianist Party (URAS–PAS)	698	0.46	−1.85	0	±0
Gijonese People (S)	687	0.46	New	0	±0
Communist Party of the Peoples of Spain (PCPE)	399	0.26	−0.32	0	±0
National Democracy (DN)	205	0.14	New	0	±0
Democracy, Citizenry and Republic (DCyR)	198	0.13	New	0	±0
Liberal and Social Alternative (ALS)	107	0.07	New	0	±0
National Front–Republican Social Movement (FrN–MSR)	73	0.05	New	0	±0
Blank ballots	3,517	2.33	+0.01		
Total	150,639			27	±0
Valid votes	150,639	98.81	−0.67		
Invalid votes	1,818	1.19	+0.67		
Votes cast / turnout	152,457	66.09	+6.48		
Abstentions	78,217	33.91	−6.48		
Registered voters	230,674				

=== Langreo ===
Population: 45,397

← Summary of the 22 May 2011 City Council of Langreo election results →
Parties and alliances	Popular vote			Seats	
Parties and alliances	Votes	%	±pp	Total	+/−
Spanish Socialist Workers' Party (PSOE)	6,957	30.86	−13.90	7	−3
People's Party (PP)	4,101	18.19	−9.75	4	−2
Forum of Citizens (FAC)	4,039	17.92	New	4	+4
United Left of Asturias–The Greens (IU–LV)	3,825	16.97	−5.85	4	−1
Left Front (FDLI)	2,288	10.15	New	2	+2
Bloc for Asturias–Asturian Nationalist Unity: Commitment for Asturias (BA–UNA)	433	1.92	New	0	±0
Asturian Renewal Union–Asturianist Party (URAS–PAS)	129	0.57	−0.53	0	±0
Open Council (Conceyu Abiertu)	70	0.31	New	0	±0
Republican Asturian Ensame (EAR)	53	0.24	New	0	±0
Blank ballots	646	2.87	+0.64		
Total	22,541			21	±0
Valid votes	22,541	97.72	−1.50		
Invalid votes	525	2.28	+1.50		
Votes cast / turnout	23,066	59.92	+4.91		
Abstentions	15,428	40.08	−4.91		
Registered voters	38,494				

=== Mieres ===
Population: 43,688

← Summary of the 22 May 2011 City Council of Mieres election results →
Parties and alliances	Popular vote			Seats	
Parties and alliances	Votes	%	±pp	Total	+/−
United Left of Asturias–The Greens (IU–LV)	9,807	41.54	+19.71	10	+5
Spanish Socialist Workers' Party (PSOE)	5,416	22.94	−17.10	5	−4
People's Party (PP)	4,433	18.78	−14.16	4	−3
Forum of Citizens (FAC)	1,843	7.81	New	2	+2
Independents of Asturias (IDEAS)	925	3.92	New	0	±0
Left Front (FDLI)	280	1.19	New	0	±0
Asturian Nationalist Unity–Bloc for Asturias: Commitment for Asturias (UNA–BA)	214	0.91	New	0	±0
Open Council (Conceyu Abiertu)	74	0.31	New	0	±0
Asturian Renewal Union–Asturianist Party (URAS–PAS)	69	0.29	−0.36	0	±0
Communist Party of the Peoples of Spain (PCPE)	64	0.27	−0.30	0	±0
Blank ballots	486	2.06	−0.35		
Total	23,611			21	±0
Valid votes	23,611	98.84	−0.36		
Invalid votes	277	1.16	+0.36		
Votes cast / turnout	23,888	63.95	+3.87		
Abstentions	13,466	36.05	−3.87		
Registered voters	37,354				

=== Oviedo ===
Population: 225,155

← Summary of the 22 May 2011 City Council of Oviedo election results →
Parties and alliances	Popular vote			Seats	
Parties and alliances	Votes	%	±pp	Total	+/−
People's Party (PP)	39,736	33.79	−22.18	11	−6
Forum of Citizens (FAC)	24,315	20.67	New	7	+7
Spanish Socialist Workers' Party (PSOE)	23,886	20.31	−9.60	6	−3
United Left of Asturias–The Greens: Oviedo for the Left (IU–LV)	13,394	11.39	+7.69	3	+3
Union, Progress and Democracy (UPyD)	4,601	3.91	New	0	±0
Citizens' Assembly for the Left–Left Front (ASCIZ–FDLI)	3,739	3.18	−3.09	0	−1
Independents of Asturias (IDEAS)	1,886	1.60	New	0	±0
Bloc for Asturias–Asturian Nationalist Unity: Commitment for Asturias (BA–UNA)	821	0.70	New	0	±0
National Democracy (DN)	447	0.38	+0.16	0	±0
Asturian Renewal Union–Asturianist Party (URAS–PAS)	353	0.30	−0.27	0	±0
Open Council (Conceyu Abiertu)	290	0.25	New	0	±0
Communist Party of the Peoples of Spain (PCPE)	224	0.19	+0.04	0	±0
Internationalist Solidarity and Self-Management (SAIn)	180	0.15	New	0	±0
National Front–Republican Social Movement (FrN–MSR)	90	0.08	New	0	±0
Blank ballots	3,648	3.10	+0.79		
Total	117,610			27	±0
Valid votes	117,610	98.69	−0.84		
Invalid votes	1,559	1.31	+0.84		
Votes cast / turnout	119,169	65.77	+5.52		
Abstentions	62,019	34.23	−5.52		
Registered voters	181,188				

=== San Martín del Rey Aurelio ===
Population: 18,549

← Summary of the 22 May 2011 City Council of San Martín del Rey Aurelio election results →
Parties and alliances	Popular vote			Seats	
Parties and alliances	Votes	%	±pp	Total	+/−
Spanish Socialist Workers' Party (PSOE)	3,973	38.69	−7.78	7	−2
People's Party (PP)	2,575	25.08	−3.20	5	±0
United Left of Asturias–The Greens (IU–LV)	2,131	20.75	+1.51	4	+1
Forum of Citizens (FAC)	885	8.62	New	1	+1
Bloc for Asturias–Asturian Nationalist Unity: Commitment for Asturias (BA–UNA)	263	2.56	New	0	±0
Open Council (Conceyu Abiertu)	194	1.89	New	0	±0
Communist Party of the Peoples of Spain (PCPE)	43	0.42	+0.04	0	±0
Blank ballots	205	2.00	+0.18		
Total	10,269			17	±0
Valid votes	10,269	97.70	−0.96		
Invalid votes	242	2.30	+0.96		
Votes cast / turnout	10,511	66.37	+3.89		
Abstentions	5,326	33.63	−3.89		
Registered voters	15,837				

=== Siero ===
Population: 51,730

← Summary of the 22 May 2011 City Council of Siero election results →
Parties and alliances	Popular vote			Seats	
Parties and alliances	Votes	%	±pp	Total	+/−
Spanish Socialist Workers' Party (PSOE)	6,201	23.20	−10.00	7	−1
Forum of Citizens (FAC)	5,516	20.64	New	6	+6
People's Party (PP)	5,386	20.15	−12.86	6	−2
United Left of Asturias–The Greens (IU–LV)	2,642	9.89	+2.07	3	+2
La Fresneda Local Platform (PVF)	1,900	7.11	+0.84	2	+1
Asturian Council (Conceyu)	1,366	5.11	−1.89	1	±0
Independent Party of Siero (PINSI)	1,333	4.99	−3.99	0	−2
Union, Progress and Democracy (UPyD)	536	2.01	New	0	±0
Left Front (FDLI)	378	1.41	New	0	±0
Bloc for Asturias–Asturian Nationalist Unity: Commitment for Asturias (BA–UNA)	317	1.19	New	0	±0
Open Council (Conceyu Abiertu)	253	0.95	New	0	±0
Asturian Renewal Union–Asturianist Party (URAS–PAS)	85	0.32	−0.56	0	±0
Blank ballots	812	3.04	+0.93		
Total	26,725			25	+4
Valid votes	26,725	98.26	−0.86		
Invalid votes	474	1.74	+0.86		
Votes cast / turnout	27,199	63.54	+3.46		
Abstentions	15,610	36.46	−3.46		
Registered voters	42,809				

== See also ==
- 2011 Asturian regional election
