= Adriana Lastra =

Spanish politician (born 1979)

Adriana Lastra MP
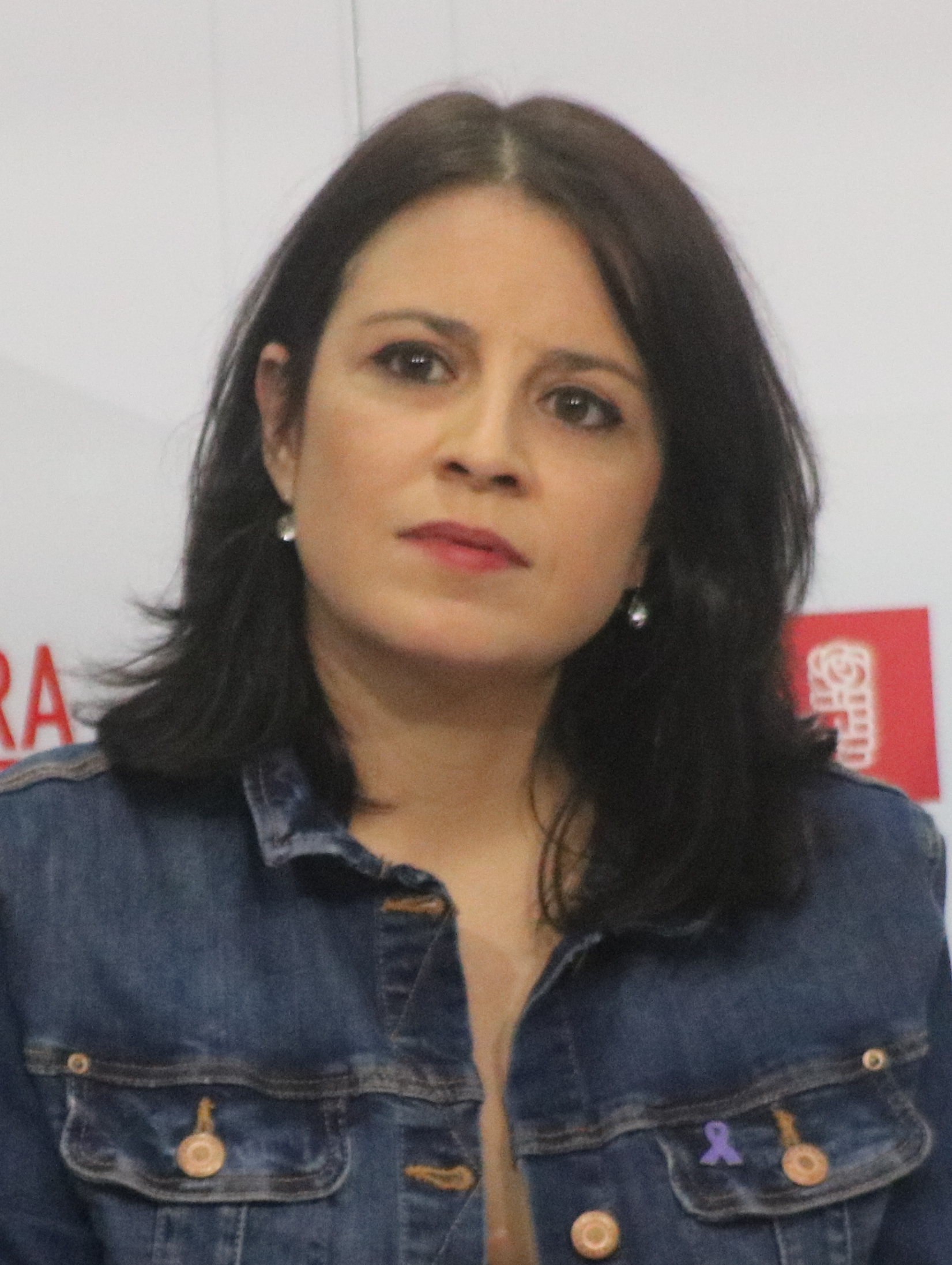
- Adriana Lastra in 2018

Deputy Secretary-General of the Spanish Socialist Workers' Party
- In office 18 June 2017 – 18 July 2022
- Secretary-General: Pedro Sánchez
- Preceded by: Office re-established Elena Valenciano (2012-2014)
- Succeeded by: María Jesús Montero

Leader of the Socialist Group in the Congress of Deputies
- In office 7 June 2018 – 8 September 2021
- Deputy: Rafael Simancas
- Preceded by: Margarita Robles
- Succeeded by: Héctor Gómez

Member of the Congress of Deputies
- Incumbent
- Assumed office 13 January 2016
- Constituency: Asturias

Member of the Parliament of Asturias
- In office 27 May 2007 – 24 May 2015
- Constituency: Eastern

Personal details
- Born: 30 March 1979 (age 46) Ribadesella, Spain
- Party: Spanish Socialist Workers' Party
- Occupation: Politician

Adriana Lastra Fernández (born 30 March 1979 in Ribadesella) is a Spanish politician member of the Spanish Socialist Workers' Party who served as the Spokesperson of the Socialist Group in the Congress of Deputies. She was also the Deputy Secretary-General of the PSOE until 18 July 2022.

== Biography ==
Lastra was born in Ribadesella, a municipality of the Spanish region of Asturias. She started studying cultural anthropology but did not finish the degree.

Lastra joined the Socialist Workers' Party at the age of 18 and she was appointed Secretary-General of the Socialist Youth of Asturias the following year, in 1999, remaining in the position until 2004 when she was appointed Secretary for Social Movements and NGOs. Between 2008 and 2012 she served as Secretary for Local Policy of the Asturian Socialist Federation.

In the 2007 Asturian regional election she was elected to the Parliament of Asturias and during that term served as Spokesperson of the Socialist Group in the Committee for the Presidency, Justice and Equality. She was re-elected in the 2011 and 2012 regional elections.

=== National politics ===
As a close associate of the newly appointed Secretary-General of the PSOE, Pedro Sánchez, she served as Secretary for Local Policy of the Spanish Socialist Workers' Party. Lastra participated for the first time in a national election in 2015, heading the list of the Asturias constituency of the Socialist Party and was elected to the Congress of Deputies. She was re-elected in the 2016 general election.

After the 2016 general election, the possibly of a third consecutive election was imminent and the Secretary-General Sánchez proposed to the Federal Committee of the PSOE (the executive body of the Party) the possibility of holding an Extraordinary Congress of an urgent nature to decide if they should allow the Second Rajoy Government or reject it (the position of Sánchez) by asking the voters. The position of most of the members of the Federal Committee was to abstain and allow Mariano Rajoy to form a new government, rejecting Sánchez's request and forcing his resignation. After his resignation, a Caretaker Commission take control of the Party and Lastra publicly rejected what the Federal Committee had done.

She was one of the decisive supports in the decision of Pedro Sánchez to attend the 2017 leadership election to regain the leadership of the PSOE and played an essential role in his campaign, based on the rejection of the ideological project of the People's Party and the importance of the socialist bases to recover the party. After Sánchez was re-elected Secretary-General with more than 50% of the votes, the 39th PSOE Congress was held, in which Lastra was named Deputy Secretary-General becoming second-in-command to Sánchez and Deputy Spokesperson of the Socialist Group in the Congress of Deputies.

After the success of the 2018 vote of no confidence in the government of Mariano Rajoy, Pedro Sánchez was elected Prime Minister of Spain and the lead (Spokesperson) of the Socialist Group in the Congress of Deputies Margarita Robles was appointed Minister of Defence, promoting Lastra to that position, becoming the youngest person and the third woman to occupy this position in the history of the Socialist Party. She was replaced by Héctor Gómez Hernández on 8 September 2021.
