= 2012 Asturian regional election =

Election in the Spanish region of Asturias

- 25 March 2012

All 45 seats in the General Junta of the Principality of Asturias 23 seats needed for a majority
- Opinion polls
- Registered: 989,993 ▲0.3%
- Turnout: 506,368 (51.1%) ▼10.6 pp
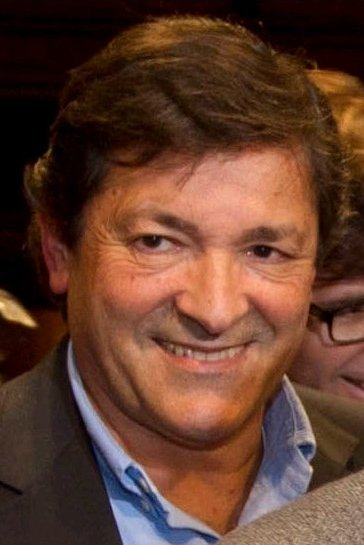

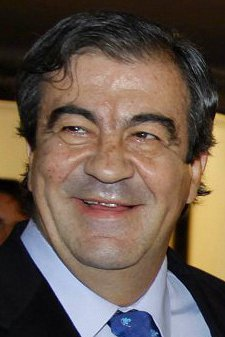

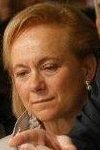

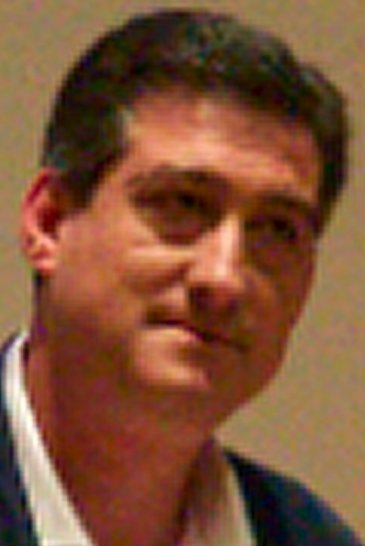
| | First party | Second party | Third party |
|---|---|---|---|
| Leader | Javier Fernández | Francisco Álvarez-Cascos | Mercedes Fernández |
| Party | PSOE | FAC | PP |
| Leader since | 23 October 2010 | 18 January 2011 | 14 February 2012 |
| Leader's seat | Central | Central | Central |
| Last election | 15 seats, 29.9% | 16 seats, 29.7% | 10 seats, 20.0% |
| Seats won | 17 | 12 | 10 |
| Seat change | ▲2 | ▼4 | 0 |
| Popular vote | 161,159 | 124,518 | 108,091 |
| Percentage | 32.1% | 24.8% | 21.5% |
| Swing | ▲2.2 pp | ▼4.9 pp | ▲1.5 pp |
| | Fourth party | Fifth party |
| Leader | Jesús Iglesias | Ignacio Prendes |
| Party | IU | UPyD |
| Leader since | 2007 | 2 November 2010 |
| Leader's seat | Central | Central |
| Last election | 4 seats, 10.3% | 0 seats, 2.4% |
| Seats won | 5 | 1 |
| Seat change | ▲1 | ▲1 |
| Popular vote | 69,118 | 18,801 |
| Percentage | 13.8% | 3.7% |
| Swing | ▲3.5 pp | ▲1.3 pp |
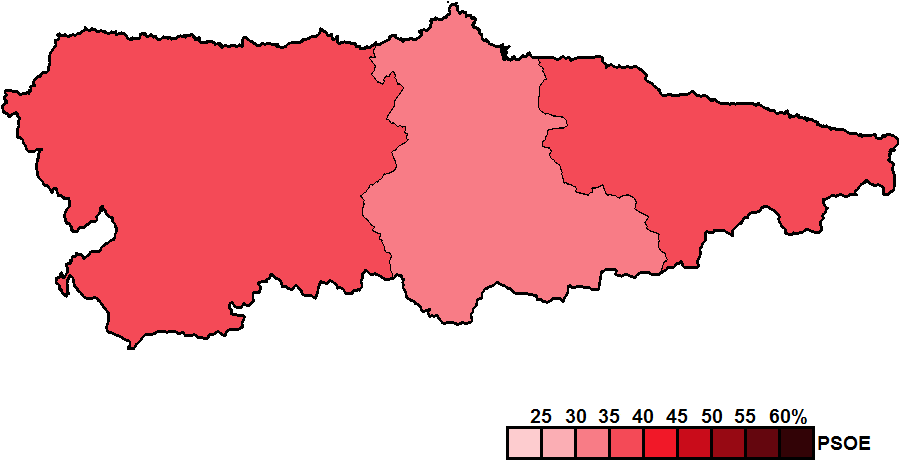
- Constituency results map for the General Junta of the Principality of Asturias
President before election
Francisco Álvarez-Cascos
FAC
Elected President
Javier Fernández
PSOE

The 2012 Asturian regional election was held on 25 March 2012 to elect the 9th General Junta of the Principality of Asturias. All 45 seats in the General Junta were up for election. It was held concurrently with a regional election in Andalusia.

This was a snap election held as a result of the incumbent government under Francisco Álvarez-Cascos failing to pass the 2012 budget in the General Junta after just six months in power. The Asturian Socialist Federation (FSA–PSOE) under Javier Fernández, which had scored first in votes but second in seats in the previous election, went on to win a decisive victory whereas Álvarez Cascos' Asturias Forum (FAC) lost its seat plurality of seats it had won in the previous election and fell from 16 to 12 seats. The People's Party (PP) was unable to improve on its 2011 results despite a change of leadership and remained stagnant at 10 seats, while United Left (IU/IX) grew from 4 to 5 seats. Voter turnout was the lowest since 1983, as just 51.1% of the electorate cast a ballot.

The election resulted in a draw between the centre-left (PSOE–IU) and centre-right (FAC–PP) blocs after the counting of the vote of those living abroad deprived FAC from a seat in the Western District, awarding it to PSOE. Union, Progress and Democracy (UPyD), which managed to get into parliament after failure in 2011 to do so, became determinant for either bloc to attain an absolute majority, with ensuing negotiations resulting in a Socialist minority government led by Javier Fernández.

== Overview ==
=== Electoral system ===
The General Junta of the Principality of Asturias was the devolved, unicameral legislature of the autonomous community of Asturias, having legislative power in regional matters as defined by the Spanish Constitution and the Asturian Statute of Autonomy, as well as the ability to vote confidence in or withdraw it from a regional president.

Voting for the General Junta was on the basis of universal suffrage, which comprised all nationals over 18 years of age, registered in Asturias and in full enjoyment of their political rights. Additionally, Asturians abroad were required to apply for voting before being permitted to vote, a system known as "begged" or expat vote (Spanish: Voto rogado). The 45 members of the General Junta of the Principality of Asturias were elected using the D'Hondt method and a closed list proportional representation, with an electoral threshold of three percent of valid votes—which included blank ballots—being applied in each constituency. Seats were allocated to constituencies, which were established by law as follows:

- Central District, comprising the municipalities of Aller, Avilés, Bimenes, Carreño, Caso, Castrillón, Corvera de Asturias, Gijón, Gozón, Illas, Las Regueras, Langreo, Laviana, Lena, Llanera, Mieres, Morcín, Noreña, Oviedo, Proaza, Quirós, Ribera de Arriba, Riosa, San Martín del Rey Aurelio, Santo Adriano, Sariego, Siero, Sobrescobio and Soto del Barco.
- Eastern District, comprising the municipalities of Amieva, Cabrales, Cabranes, Cangas de Onís, Caravia, Colunga, Llanes, Nava, Onís, Parres, Peñamellera Alta, Peñamellera Baja, Piloña, Ponga, Ribadedeva, Ribadesella and Villaviciosa.
- Western District, comprising the municipalities of Allande, Belmonte de Miranda, Boal, Candamo, Cangas del Narcea, Castropol, Coaña, Cudillero, Degaña, El Franco, Grado, Grandas de Salime, Ibias, Illano, Muros de Nalón, Navia, Pesoz, Pravia, Salas, San Martín de Oscos, Santa Eulalia de Oscos, San Tirso de Abres, Somiedo, Tapia de Casariego, Taramundi, Teverga, Tineo, Valdés, Vegadeo, Villanueva de Oscos, Villayón and Yernes y Tameza.

Each constituency was allocated an initial minimum of two seats, with the remaining 39 being distributed in proportion to their populations.

In smaller constituencies, the use of the electoral method resulted in an effective threshold based on the district magnitude and the distribution of votes among candidacies.

The electoral law allowed for parties and federations registered in the interior ministry, coalitions and groupings of electors to present lists of candidates. Parties and federations intending to form a coalition ahead of an election were required to inform the relevant Electoral Commission within ten days of the election call, whereas groupings of electors needed to secure the signature of at least one percent of the electorate in the constituencies for which they sought election, disallowing electors from signing for more than one list of candidates.

=== Election date ===
The term of the General Junta of the Principality of Asturias expired four years after the date of its previous election. Elections to the General Junta were fixed for the fourth Sunday of May every four years.

The president had the prerogative to dissolve the General Junta and call a snap election, provided that no motion of no confidence was in process, no nationwide election was due and some time requirements were met: namely, that dissolution did not occur either during the first legislative session or within the legislature's last year ahead of its scheduled expiry, nor before one year had elapsed since a previous dissolution under this procedure. In the event of an investiture process failing to elect a regional president within a two-month period from the first ballot, the General Junta was to be automatically dissolved and a fresh election called. Any snap election held as a result of these circumstances would not alter the period to the next ordinary election, with elected lawmakers serving the remainder of its original four-year term.

== Parliamentary composition ==
The General Junta of the Principality of Asturias was officially dissolved on 30 January 2012, after the publication of the dissolution decree in the Official Gazette of the Principality of Asturias. The table below shows the composition of the parliamentary groups in the General Junta at the time of dissolution.

Parliamentary composition in January 2012
| Groups | Parties | Legislators | |
| Groups | Parties | Seats | Total |
|---|---|---|---|
| Asturias Forum Parliamentary Group | FAC | 16 | 16 |
| Socialist Parliamentary Group | PSOE | 15 | 15 |
| People's Parliamentary Group | PP | 10 | 10 |
| United Left-The Greens Parliamentary Group | IU | 4 | 4 |

== Opinion polls ==
The table below lists voting intention estimates in reverse chronological order, showing the most recent first and using the dates when the survey fieldwork was done, as opposed to the date of publication. Where the fieldwork dates are unknown, the date of publication is given instead. The highest percentage figure in each polling survey is displayed with its background shaded in the leading party's colour. If a tie ensues, this is applied to the figures with the highest percentages. The "Lead" column on the right shows the percentage-point difference between the parties with the highest percentages in a poll. When available, seat projections determined by the polling organisations are displayed below (or in place of) the percentages in a smaller font; 23 seats were required for an absolute majority in the General Junta of the Principality of Asturias.

| Polling firm/Commissioner | Fieldwork date | Sample size | Turnout | PSOE | FAC | PP | IU/IX | UPyD | Lead |
|---|---|---|---|---|---|---|---|---|---|
| 2012 regional election | 25 Mar 2012 | —N/a | 51.1 | 32.1; 17 | 24.8; 12 | 21.5; 10 | 13.8; 5 | 3.7; 1 | 7.3 |
| Celeste-Tel | 19 Mar 2012 | ? | ? | 32.3; 14/17 | 22.3; 10/12 | 23.0; 11/13 | 12.6; 4/7 | 4.2; 1/2 | 9.3 |
| NC Report/La Razón | 19 Mar 2012 | ? | ? | ? 15/16 | ? 11/12 | ? 12/13 | ? 5/6 | ? 1/2 | ? |
| GAD3/ABC | 15–16 Mar 2012 | 800 | ? | 33.3; 15/16 | 21.0; 10/11 | 25.8; 12/13 | 10.1; 4/5 | 3.8; 1 | 7.5 |
| Sigma Dos/El Mundo | 12–15 Mar 2012 | 1,000 | ? | 27.7; 13/14 | 27.1; 13/14 | 22.2; 10/11 | 14.8; 6/7 | 3.2; 1 | 0.6 |
| Opinión 2000/Cadena SER | 9 Mar 2012 | 400 | ? | 35.1; 17/18 | 20.9; 10/11 | 24.3; 12 | 12.4; 5 | 2.6; 0 | 10.8 |
| Ipsos/La Nueva España | 5–9 Mar 2012 | 1,300 | ? | 29.5; 15 | 22.5; 11/12 | 22.6; 11/12 | 13.0; 6 | 3.8; 1 | 6.9 |
| PP | 6 Mar 2012 | 250 | ? | ? 17/18 | ? 9/10 | ? 12/14 | ? 4/5 | ? 0/1 | ? |
| CIS | 15–28 Feb 2012 | 1,800 | ? | 28.2; 14 | 22.7; 10/11 | 24.0; 11/12 | 14.5; 7 | 4.4; 2 | 4.2 |
| NC Report/La Razón | 15–28 Feb 2012 | 900 | 57.6 | 32.5; 16 | 24.5; 12 | 23.3; 12 | ? 4 | ? 1 | 8.0 |
| Low Cost/La Gaceta | 16–21 Feb 2012 | ? | ? | ? 15 | ? 10 | ? 15 | ? 4 | ? 1 | ? |
| 2011 general election | 20 Nov 2011 | —N/a | 64.6 | 29.3 | 14.7 | 35.4 | 13.2 | 3.9 | 6.1 |
| 2011 regional election | 22 May 2011 | —N/a | 61.7 | 29.9; 15 | 29.7; 16 | 20.0; 10 | 10.3; 4 | 2.4; 0 | 0.2 |

== Results ==
=== Overall ===
← Summary of the 25 March 2012 General Junta of the Principality of Asturias election results →
| Parties and alliances | Popular vote | | | Seats | |
| Parties and alliances | Votes | % | ±pp | Total | +/− |
|---|---|---|---|---|---|
| Spanish Socialist Workers' Party (PSOE) | 161,159 | 32.10 | +2.18 | 17 | +2 |
| Forum of Citizens (FAC) | 124,518 | 24.80 | −4.86 | 12 | −4 |
| People's Party (PP) | 108,091 | 21.53 | +1.58 | 10 | ±0 |
| United Left of Asturias (IU/IX) | 69,118 | 13.77 | +3.49 | 5 | +1 |
| Union, Progress and Democracy (UPyD) | 18,801 | 3.74 | +1.30 | 1 | +1 |
| Blank Seats (EB) | 4,107 | 0.82 | New | 0 | ±0 |
| Equo–The Greens of Asturias (Equo–LV) | 2,558 | 0.51 | New | 0 | ±0 |
| Commitment for Asturias (BA–UNA–LV–GV)^{1} | 1,656 | 0.33 | −1.30 | 0 | ±0 |
| Animalist Party Against Mistreatment of Animals (PACMA) | 1,449 | 0.29 | −0.03 | 0 | ±0 |
| Communist Party of the Peoples of Spain (PCPE) | 782 | 0.16 | −0.08 | 0 | ±0 |
| Independents of Asturias–Hartos.org (IDEAS–Hartos.org) | 738 | 0.15 | −0.91 | 0 | ±0 |
| Andecha Astur (Andecha) | 674 | 0.13 | New | 0 | ±0 |
| Asturian Renewal Union (URAS)^{2} | 454 | 0.09 | −0.40 | 0 | ±0 |
| Democratic and Constitutional Party (PDyC) | 237 | 0.05 | −0.12 | 0 | ±0 |
| Republican Social Movement (MSR) | 183 | 0.04 | ±0.00 | 0 | ±0 |
| Internationalist Solidarity and Self-Management (SAIn) | 178 | 0.04 | New | 0 | ±0 |
| Communist Unification of Spain (UCE) | 100 | 0.02 | +0.02 | 0 | ±0 |
| Auseva Red (Auseva Red) | 55 | 0.01 | New | 0 | ±0 |
| Humanist Party (PH) | 28 | 0.01 | New | 0 | ±0 |
| Land Party (PT) | 16 | 0.00 | New | 0 | ±0 |
| Family and Life Party (PFyV) | 5 | 0.00 | New | 0 | ±0 |
| Blank ballots | 7,166 | 1.43 | −1.17 | | |
| Total | 502,073 | | | 45 | ±0 |
| Valid votes | 502,073 | 99.15 | +0.59 | | |
| Invalid votes | 4,295 | 0.85 | −0.59 | | |
| Votes cast / turnout | 506,368 | 51.15 | −10.54 | | |
| Abstentions | 483,625 | 48.85 | +10.54 | | |
| Registered voters | 989,993 | | | | |
Sources
Footnotes: ^{1} Commitment for Asturias results are compared to the combined totals of Bloc for Asturias–Asturian Nationalist Unity: Commitment for Asturias and The Greens–Green Group in the 2011 election.; ^{2} Asturian Renewal Union results are compared to Asturian Renewal Union–Asturianist Party totals in the 2011 election.

Popular vote
| PSOE | 32.10% |
| FAC | 24.80% |
| PP | 21.53% |
| IU/IX | 13.77% |
| UPyD | 3.74% |
| Others | 2.63% |
| Blank ballots | 1.43% |

Seats
| PSOE | 37.78% |
| FAC | 26.67% |
| PP | 22.22% |
| IU/IX | 11.11% |
| UPyD | 2.22% |

=== Distribution by constituency ===
| Constituency | PSOE | | FAC | | PP | | IU/IX | | UPyD | |
| Constituency | % | S | % | S | % | S | % | S | % | S |
|---|---|---|---|---|---|---|---|---|---|---|
| Central | 31.2 | 12 | 24.6 | 9 | 20.6 | 7 | 15.0 | 5 | 4.2 | 1 |
| Eastern | 35.9 | 2 | 28.3 | 2 | 24.3 | 1 | 6.5 | − | 1.8 | − |
| Western | 35.8 | 3 | 23.8 | 1 | 26.3 | 2 | 9.3 | − | 1.7 | − |
| Total | 32.1 | 17 | 24.8 | 12 | 21.5 | 10 | 13.8 | 5 | 3.7 | 1 |

== Aftermath ==
After the election, the leader of the Asturian PSOE, Javier Fernández, and incumbent Asturian President, Francisco Álvarez Cascos, were tasked to form a coalition government. The election led to a political impasse as the center-left (PSOE and IU-IX) and center-right coalitions (FAC and PP) each gained 22 seats in the election (23 seats are required for a majority in the 45-seat Assembly). The remaining seat was held by the centrist UPyD, which became the kingmaker in the negotiation.

Coalition talks took almost two months to reach an agreement. One of the main events during the negotiation was the legal battle in the Spanish Constitutional Court over the 45th seat, the assignment of which was delayed by the counting of the ballots of those voting abroad. FAC disputed the seat's assignment to the PSOE and asked for a revote; however, the Constitutional Court rejected the appeal and upheld the seat for the PSOE.

UPyD finally agreed to support a PSOE government, their main reason to do so being the threat by Finance Minister Cristóbal Montoro to intervene in Asturian government accounts. On 23 May 2012, PSOE leader Javier Fernández was elected as the new President of the Principality of Asturias with support from IU and UPyD.

Investiture
| Ballot → | 23 May 2012 | |
| Required majority → | 23 out of 45 | |
| Javier Fernández (PSOE): • PSOE (17); • IU/IX (5); • UPyD (1) | 23 / 45 | check |
| Abstentions: • FAC (12); • PP (10) | 22 / 45 | |
| Absentees | 0 / 45 | |
