= Eastern District (General Junta of Asturias constituency) =

- General Junta of the Principality of Asturias; Electoral constituency
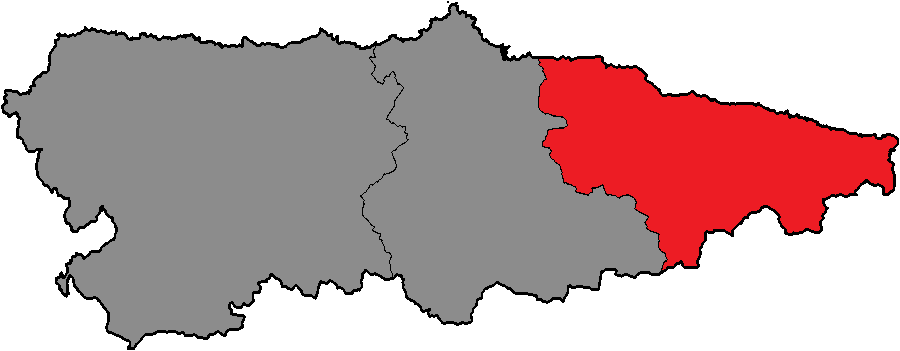
- Location of the Eastern District within Asturias
- Province: Asturias
- Autonomous community: Principality of Asturias
- Population: 69,760 (2019)
- Electorate: 86,404 (2023)

Current constituency
- Created: 1983
- Seats: 5
- Members: PSOE (3); PP (2)

Eastern District is one of the three constituencies (Spanish: circunscripciones) represented in the General Junta of the Principality of Asturias, the regional legislature of the Principality of Asturias. The constituency currently elects five deputies. It comprises the municipalities of Amieva, Cabrales, Cabranes, Cangas de Onís, Caravia, Colunga, Llanes, Nava, Onís, Parres, Peñamellera Alta, Peñamellera Baja, Piloña, Ponga, Ribadedeva, Ribadesella and Villaviciosa. The electoral system uses the D'Hondt method and closed-list proportional representation, with a minimum threshold of three percent.

== Electoral system ==
The constituency was created as per the Statute of Autonomy for Asturias of 1981 and was first contested in the 1983 regional election. The Statute provided for sub-provincial divisions of the Principality's territory to be established as multi-member districts in the General Junta of the Principality of Asturias, with this regulation being maintained under the 1986 regional electoral law. Each constituency is entitled to an initial minimum of two seats, with the remaining 39 being distributed in proportion to their populations. The exception was the 1983 election, when each constituency was allocated a fixed number of seats: 32 for the Central District, 5 for the Eastern District and 8 for the Western District.

Voting is on the basis of universal suffrage, which comprises all nationals over eighteen, registered in Asturias and in full enjoyment of their political rights. Amendments to the electoral law in 2011 required for Asturians abroad to apply for voting before being permitted to vote, a system known as "begged" or expat vote (Spanish: Voto rogado) which was abolished in 2022. Seats are elected using the D'Hondt method and a closed list proportional representation, with a threshold of three percent of valid votes—which includes blank ballots—being applied in each constituency. The only exception was in 1983, when a five percent threshold was applied regionally. Parties not reaching the threshold are not taken into consideration for seat distribution. The use of the D'Hondt method might result in a higher effective threshold, depending on the district magnitude.

The electoral law allows for parties and federations registered in the interior ministry, coalitions and groupings of electors to present lists of candidates. Parties and federations intending to form a coalition ahead of an election are required to inform the relevant Electoral Commission within ten days of the election call—fifteen before 1985—whereas groupings of electors need to secure the signature of at least one percent of the electorate in the constituencies for which they seek election—one-thousandth of the electorate, with a compulsory minimum of 500 signatures, until 1985—disallowing electors from signing for more than one list of candidates.

== Deputies ==
Deputies 1983–present
Key to parties Podemos PSOE PP CP AP FAC
Junta	Election	Distribution
1st	1983	3 / 2
2nd	1987	3 / 2
3rd	1991	3 / 2
4th	1995	2 / 3
5th	1999	3 / 2
6th	2003	3 / 2
7th	2007	3 / 2
8th	2011	2 / 1 / 2
9th	2012	2 / 1 / 2
10th	2015	1 / 2 / 2
11th	2019	3 / 2
12th	2023	3 / 2

== Regional elections ==
=== 2023 ===
Summary of the 28 May 2023 General Junta of Asturias election results in the Eastern District
Parties and alliances	Popular vote			Seats	
Parties and alliances	Votes	%	±pp	Total	+/−
Spanish Socialist Workers' Party (PSOE)	15,665	38.33	–2.14	3	±0
People's Party (PP)	14,883	36.42	+14.25	2	±0
Vox (Vox)	3,871	9.47	+4.32	0	±0
Assembly for Asturias United Left–More Country–Asturian Left (IU–MP–IAS)^{1}	1,908	4.67	+1.36	0	±0
Asturias Forum (Foro)	1,581	3.87	–5.00	0	±0
We Can Asturias (Podemos Asturies)	1,052	2.57	–5.25	0	±0
SOS Asturias–Empty Spain (SOS Asturias)	416	1.02	New	0	±0
Citizens–Party of the Citizenry (CS)	326	0.80	–9.73	0	±0
Andecha Astur (Andecha)	100	0.24	–0.04	0	±0
For a Fairer World (PUM+J)	80	0.20	New	0	±0
Communist Party of the Workers of Spain (PCTE)	78	0.19	+0.04	0	±0
Unite Principality (SMP)	74	0.18	New	0	±0
Blank ballots	831	2.03	+0.78		
Total	40,865			5	±0
Valid votes	40,865	97.78	–0.60		
Invalid votes	927	2.22	+0.60		
Votes cast / turnout	41,792	48.37	+1.41		
Abstentions	44,612	51.63	–1.41		
Registered voters	86,404				
Sources
Footnotes: ^{1} Assembly for Asturias United Left–More Country–Asturian Left results are compared to United Left–Asturian Left: Asturias by the Left totals in the 2019 election.

=== 2019 ===
Summary of the 26 May 2019 General Junta of Asturias election results in the Eastern District
Parties and alliances	Popular vote			Seats	
Parties and alliances	Votes	%	±pp	Total	+/−
Spanish Socialist Workers' Party (PSOE)	16,033	40.47	+7.52	3	+1
People's Party (PP)	8,781	22.17	–4.77	2	±0
Citizens–Party of the Citizenry (Cs)	4,172	10.53	+6.42	0	±0
Forum of Citizens (FAC)	3,513	8.87	–3.42	0	±0
We Can Asturias (Podemos Asturies)	3,098	7.82	–5.40	0	–1
Vox (Vox)	2,039	5.15	+5.15	0	±0
United Left–Asturian Left: Asturias by the Left (IU–IAS)	1,311	3.31	–2.72	0	±0
Andecha Astur (Andecha)	112	0.28	+0.12	0	±0
Communist Party of the Workers of Spain (PCTE)	61	0.15	New	0	±0
Blank ballots	496	1.25	–1.05		
Total	39,616			5	±0
Valid votes	39,616	98.38	+0.41		
Invalid votes	651	1.62	–0.41		
Votes cast / turnout	40,267	46.96	–1.54		
Abstentions	45,480	53.04	+1.54		
Registered voters	85,747				

=== 2015 ===
Summary of the 24 May 2015 General Junta of Asturias election results in the Eastern District
Parties and alliances	Popular vote			Seats	
Parties and alliances	Votes	%	±pp	Total	+/−
Spanish Socialist Workers' Party (PSOE)	13,433	32.95	–2.94	2	±0
People's Party (PP)	10,984	26.94	+2.63	2	+1
We Can (Podemos)	5,391	13.22	New	1	+1
Forum of Citizens (FAC)	5,012	12.29	–16.06	0	–2
United Left of Asturias (IU/IX)	2,460	6.03	–0.50	0	±0
Citizens–Party of the Citizenry (C's)	1,674	4.11	New	0	±0
Animalist Party Against Mistreatment of Animals (PACMA)	204	0.50	+0.31	0	±0
Union, Progress and Democracy (UPyD)	185	0.45	–1.36	0	±0
Blank Seats (EB)	137	0.34	–0.07	0	±0
Equo (Equo)	126	0.31	–0.07	0	±0
Andecha Astur (Andecha)	64	0.16	+0.02	0	±0
Spanish Phalanx of the CNSO (FE–JONS)	59	0.14	New	0	±0
Communist Party of the Peoples of Spain (PCPE)	41	0.10	±0.00	0	±0
Republican Social Movement (MSR)	22	0.05	+0.02	0	±0
Zero Cuts (Recortes Cero)	22	0.05	New	0	±0
Humanist Party (PH)	15	0.04	±0.00	0	±0
Vox (Vox)	0	0.00	New	0	±0
Citizens' Democratic Renewal Movement (RED)	0	0.00	New	0	±0
Asturian Renewal Union (URAS)	0	0.00	–0.05	0	±0
Blank ballots	936	2.30	+0.98		
Total	40,765			5	±0
Valid votes	40,765	97.97	–0.69		
Invalid votes	844	2.03	+0.69		
Votes cast / turnout	41,609	48.50	+3.98		
Abstentions	44,186	51.50	–3.98		
Registered voters	85,795				

=== 2012 ===
Summary of the 25 March 2012 General Junta of Asturias election results in the Eastern District
Parties and alliances	Popular vote			Seats	
Parties and alliances	Votes	%	±pp	Total	+/−
Spanish Socialist Workers' Party (PSOE)	13,204	35.89	+0.58	2	±0
Forum of Citizens (FAC)	10,429	28.35	–4.92	2	±0
People's Party (PP)	8,944	24.31	+4.02	1	±0
United Left of Asturias (IU/IX)	2,401	6.53	+1.46	0	±0
Union, Progress and Democracy (UPyD)	667	1.81	+1.12	0	±0
Blank Seats (EB)	150	0.41	New	0	±0
Equo–The Greens of Asturias (Equo–LV)	138	0.38	New	0	±0
Commitment for Asturias (BA–UNA–LV–GV)^{1}	92	0.25	–0.83	0	±0
Animalist Party Against Mistreatment of Animals (PACMA)	69	0.19	–0.06	0	±0
Auseva Red (Auseva Red)	55	0.15	New	0	±0
Andecha Astur (Andecha)	52	0.14	New	0	±0
Communist Party of the Peoples of Spain (PCPE)	35	0.10	–0.02	0	±0
Asturian Renewal Union (URAS)^{2}	18	0.05	–0.29	0	±0
Democratic and Constitutional Party (PDyC)	14	0.04	–0.08	0	±0
Humanist Party (PH)	14	0.04	New	0	±0
Republican Social Movement (MSR)	11	0.03	New	0	±0
Communist Unification of Spain (UCE)	7	0.02	New	0	±0
Family and Life Party (PFyV)	5	0.01	New	0	±0
Independents of Asturias–Hartos.org (IDEAS–Hartos.org)	0	0.00	–0.38	0	±0
Internationalist Solidarity and Self-Management (SAIn)	0	0.00	New	0	±0
Blank ballots	487	1.32	–0.89		
Total	36,792			5	±0
Valid votes	36,792	98.66	+0.39		
Invalid votes	500	1.34	–0.39		
Votes cast / turnout	37,292	44.52	–12.33		
Abstentions	46,479	55.48	+12.33		
Registered voters	83,771				
Sources
Footnotes: ^{1} Commitment for Asturias results are compared to the combined totals of Bloc for Asturias–Asturian Nationalist Unity: Commitment for Asturias and The Greens–Green Group in the 2011 election.; ^{2} Asturian Renewal Union results are compared to Asturian Renewal Union–Asturianist Party totals in the 2011 election.

=== 2011 ===
Summary of the 22 May 2011 General Junta of Asturias election results in the Eastern District
Parties and alliances	Popular vote			Seats	
Parties and alliances	Votes	%	±pp	Total	+/−
Spanish Socialist Workers' Party (PSOE)	16,376	35.31	–10.98	2	–1
Forum of Citizens (FAC)	15,428	33.27	New	2	+2
People's Party (PP)	9,410	20.29	–21.61	1	–1
United Left of Asturias–The Greens (IU–LV)	2,349	5.07	–0.49	0	±0
Union, Progress and Democracy (UPyD)	320	0.69	New	0	±0
Bloc for Asturias–Asturian Nationalist Unity: Commitment for Asturias (BA–UNA)	295	0.64	New	0	±0
The Greens–Green Group (LV–GV)	203	0.44	New	0	±0
Left Front (FDLI)	197	0.42	New	0	±0
Independents of Asturias (IDEAS)	176	0.38	New	0	±0
Asturian Renewal Union–Asturianist Party (URAS–PAS)	156	0.34	–2.30	0	±0
Open Council (Conceyu Abiertu)	146	0.31	New	0	±0
Anti-Bullfighting Party Against Mistreatment of Animals (PACMA)	115	0.25	New	0	±0
Constitutional and Democratic Party (PDyC)	57	0.12	New	0	±0
Communist Party of the Peoples of Spain (PCPE)	55	0.12	–0.08	0	±0
National Democracy (DN)	30	0.06	–0.06	0	±0
Liberal and Social Alternative (ALS)	27	0.06	New	0	±0
Communist Unification of Spain (UCE)	11	0.02	New	0	±0
Blank ballots	1,026	2.21	+0.42		
Total	46,377			5	±0
Valid votes	46,377	98.27	–0.64		
Invalid votes	817	1.73	+0.64		
Votes cast / turnout	47,194	56.85	–7.38		
Abstentions	35,822	43.15	+7.38		
Registered voters	83,016				

=== 2007 ===
Summary of the 27 May 2007 General Junta of Asturias election results in the Eastern District
Parties and alliances	Popular vote			Seats	
Parties and alliances	Votes	%	±pp	Total	+/−
Spanish Socialist Workers' Party (PSOE)	23,319	46.29	+2.55	3	±0
People's Party (PP)	21,108	41.90	–1.06	2	±0
United Left–Bloc for Asturias–The Greens of Asturias (IU–BA–LV)^{1}	2,803	5.56	–0.07	0	±0
Asturian Renewal Union–Asturianist Party (URAS–PAS)^{2}	1,332	2.64	–2.16	0	±0
Unity (Unidá)	261	0.52	New	0	±0
Andecha Astur (AA)	231	0.46	–0.36	0	±0
Asturian Democratic Convergence (CDAS)	128	0.25	New	0	±0
Republican Left (IR)	104	0.21	New	0	±0
Communist Party of the Peoples of Spain (PCPE)	101	0.20	+0.05	0	±0
National Democracy (DN)	58	0.12	New	0	±0
Asturian Council (Conceyu)	31	0.06	New	0	±0
Blank ballots	901	1.79	+0.13		
Total	50,377			5	±0
Valid votes	50,377	98.91	–0.10		
Invalid votes	553	1.09	+0.10		
Votes cast / turnout	50,930	64.23	–1.15		
Abstentions	28,369	35.77	+1.15		
Registered voters	79,299				
Sources
Footnotes: ^{1} United Left–Bloc for Asturias–The Greens of Asturias results are compared to the combined totals of United Left–Bloc for Asturias and The Greens–Green Left of Asturias in the 2003 election.; ^{2} Asturian Renewal Union–Asturianist Party results are compared to the combined totals of Asturian Renewal Union and Asturianist Party in the 2003 election.

=== 2003 ===
Summary of the 25 May 2003 General Junta of Asturias election results in the Eastern District
Parties and alliances	Popular vote			Seats	
Parties and alliances	Votes	%	±pp	Total	+/−
Spanish Socialist Workers' Party (PSOE)	22,052	43.74	–0.50	3	±0
People's Party (PP)	21,660	42.96	+6.01	2	±0
United Left–Bloc for Asturias (IU–BA)	2,577	5.11	+1.25	0	±0
Asturian Renewal Union (URAS)	1,755	3.48	–5.98	0	±0
Asturianist Party (PAS)	665	1.32	–1.95	0	±0
Andecha Astur (AA)	411	0.82	+0.34	0	±0
The Greens–Green Left of Asturias (LV–IVA)	264	0.52	+0.24	0	±0
Senior Defense Platform (PlaDeTE)	119	0.24	New	0	±0
Communist Party of the Peoples of Spain (PCPE)^{1}	77	0.15	±0.00	0	±0
Blank ballots	835	1.66	+0.39		
Total	50,415			5	±0
Valid votes	50,415	99.01	–0.13		
Invalid votes	503	0.99	+0.13		
Votes cast / turnout	50,918	65.38	–1.05		
Abstentions	26,958	34.62	+1.05		
Registered voters	77,876				
Sources
Footnotes: ^{1} Communist Party of the Peoples of Spain results are compared to Asturian Left Bloc totals in the 1999 election.

=== 1999 ===
Summary of the 13 June 1999 General Junta of Asturias election results in the Eastern District
Parties and alliances	Popular vote			Seats	
Parties and alliances	Votes	%	±pp	Total	+/−
Spanish Socialist Workers' Party (PSOE)	22,227	44.24	+1.66	3	+1
People's Party (PP)	18,564	36.95	–7.13	2	–1
Asturian Renewal Union (URAS)	4,752	9.46	New	0	±0
United Left of Asturias (IU)	1,937	3.86	–2.64	0	±0
Asturianist Party (PAS)	1,641	3.27	+0.48	0	±0
Andecha Astur (AA)	240	0.48	+0.24	0	±0
The Greens of Asturias (LV)	141	0.28	–0.13	0	±0
Asturian Left Bloc (BIA)^{1}	77	0.15	–0.02	0	±0
Humanist Party (PH)	23	0.05	New	0	±0
Blank ballots	638	1.27	+0.20		
Total	50,240			5	±0
Valid votes	50,240	99.14	–0.12		
Invalid votes	434	0.86	+0.12		
Votes cast / turnout	50,674	66.43	–5.51		
Abstentions	25,608	33.57	+5.51		
Registered voters	76,282				
Sources
Footnotes: ^{1} Asturian Left Bloc results are compared to Communist Party of the Peoples of Spain totals in the 1995 election.

=== 1995 ===
Summary of the 28 May 1995 General Junta of Asturias election results in the Eastern District
Parties and alliances	Popular vote			Seats	
Parties and alliances	Votes	%	±pp	Total	+/−
People's Party (PP)	22,536	44.08	+6.59	3	+1
Spanish Socialist Workers' Party (PSOE)	21,770	42.58	–2.40	2	–1
United Left (IU)	3,323	6.50	+1.49	0	±0
Asturianist Party (PAS)^{1}	1,424	2.79	+0.48	0	±0
Asturian Centre–Democratic and Social Centre (CA–CDS)	1,104	2.16	–5.33	0	±0
The Greens of Asturias (LV)	212	0.41	–0.22	0	±0
Andecha Astur (AA)	123	0.24	+0.03	0	±0
Communist Party of the Peoples of Spain (PCPE)	85	0.17	–0.07	0	±0
Blank ballots	545	1.07	–0.11		
Total	51,122			5	±0
Valid votes	51,122	99.26	+0.08		
Invalid votes	383	0.74	–0.08		
Votes cast / turnout	51,505	71.94	+6.95		
Abstentions	20,093	28.06	–6.95		
Registered voters	71,598				
Sources
Footnotes: ^{1} Asturianist Party results are compared to Asturian Coalition totals in the 1991 election.

=== 1991 ===
Summary of the 26 May 1991 General Junta of Asturias election results in the Eastern District
Parties and alliances	Popular vote			Seats	
Parties and alliances	Votes	%	±pp	Total	+/−
Spanish Socialist Workers' Party (PSOE)	20,757	44.98	+0.63	3	±0
People's Party (PP)^{1}	17,300	37.49	+1.69	2	±0
Democratic and Social Centre (CDS)	3,458	7.49	–6.12	0	±0
United Left (IU)	2,314	5.01	+1.33	0	±0
Asturian Coalition (PAS–UNA)^{2}	1,065	2.31	+1.46	0	±0
The Greens (LV)	290	0.63	New	0	±0
Communist Party of the Peoples of Spain (PCPE)	112	0.24	New	0	±0
Independent Council of Asturias (Conceyu)	107	0.23	New	0	±0
Gijonese Garments Workers (TGC)	104	0.23	New	0	±0
Andecha Astur (AA)	97	0.21	New	0	±0
Blank ballots	545	1.18	+0.34		
Total	46,149			5	±0
Valid votes	46,149	99.18	+0.74		
Invalid votes	383	0.82	–0.74		
Votes cast / turnout	46,532	64.99	–5.49		
Abstentions	25,066	35.01	+5.49		
Registered voters	71,598				
Sources
Footnotes: ^{1} People's Party results are compared to the combined totals of People's Alliance and People's Democratic Party in the 1987 election.; ^{2} Asturian Coalition results are compared to Asturianist Party totals in the 1987 election.

=== 1987 ===
Summary of the 10 June 1987 General Junta of Asturias election results in the Eastern District
Parties and alliances	Popular vote			Seats	
Parties and alliances	Votes	%	±pp	Total	+/−
Spanish Socialist Workers' Party (PSOE)	21,018	44.35	+0.60	3	±0
People's Alliance (AP)^{1}	16,738	35.32	–7.01	2	±0
Democratic and Social Centre (CDS)	6,450	13.61	+10.17	0	±0
United Left (IU)^{2}	1,745	3.68	–4.60	0	±0
Asturianist Party (PAS)	401	0.85	New	0	±0
People's Democratic Party (PDP)	229	0.48	New	0	±0
Workers' Socialist Party (PST)	188	0.40	–0.28	0	±0
Asturian Nationalist Ensame (ENA)	141	0.30	–0.01	0	±0
Humanist Platform (PH)	84	0.18	New	0	±0
Blank ballots	398	0.84	+0.43		
Total	47,392			5	±0
Valid votes	47,392	98.44	–0.84		
Invalid votes	751	1.56	+0.84		
Votes cast / turnout	48,143	70.48	+2.83		
Abstentions	20,166	29.52	–2.83		
Registered voters	68,309				
Sources
Footnotes: ^{1} People's Alliance results are compared to People's Coalition totals in the 1983 election.; ^{2} United Left results are compared to Communist Party of Asturias totals in the 1983 election.

=== 1983 ===
Summary of the 8 May 1983 General Junta of Asturias election results in the Eastern District
Parties and alliances	Popular vote			Seats	
Parties and alliances	Votes	%	±pp	Total	+/−
Spanish Socialist Workers' Party (PSOE)	21,121	43.75	n/a	3	n/a
People's Coalition (AP–PDP–UL)	20,435	42.33	n/a	2	n/a
Communist Party of Asturias (PCA–PCE)	3,997	8.28	n/a	0	n/a
Democratic and Social Centre (CDS)	1,663	3.44	n/a	0	n/a
Workers' Socialist Party (PST)	327	0.68	n/a	0	n/a
Communist Candidacy (PRUC–PCPE)	177	0.37	n/a	0	n/a
Asturian Nationalist Ensame (ENA)	149	0.31	n/a	0	n/a
Asturian Left (MC–LCR)	125	0.26	n/a	0	n/a
Popular Struggle Coalition (CLP)	83	0.17	n/a	0	n/a
Blank ballots	197	0.41	n/a		
Total	48,274			5	n/a
Valid votes	48,274	99.28	n/a		
Invalid votes	349	0.72	n/a		
Votes cast / turnout	48,623	67.65	n/a		
Abstentions	23,255	32.35	n/a		
Registered voters	71,878				
