= 2011 Asturian regional election =

Election in the Spanish region of Asturias

- 22 May 2011

All 45 seats in the General Junta of the Principality of Asturias 23 seats needed for a majority
- Opinion polls
- Registered: 987,305 ▲0.6%
- Turnout: 609,072 (61.7%) ▲0.1 pp
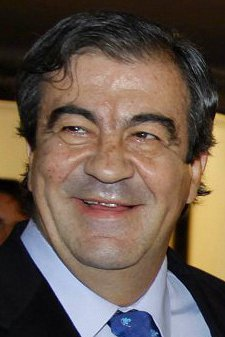

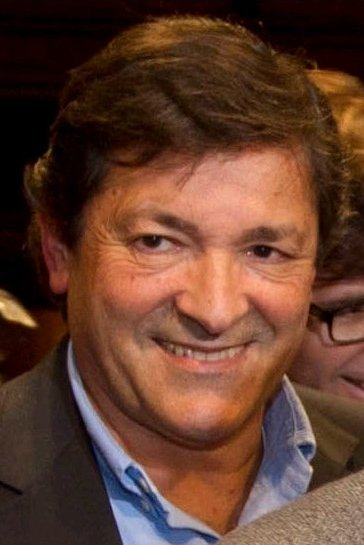

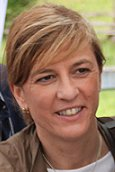

	First party	Second party	Third party
Leader	Francisco Álvarez Cascos	Javier Fernández	Isabel Pérez-Espinosa
Party	FAC	PSOE	PP
Leader since	18 January 2011	23 October 2010	29 December 2010
Leader's seat	Central	Central	Central
Last election	Did not contest	21 seats, 42.0%	20 seats, 41.5%
Seats won	16	15	10
Seat change	▲16	▼6	▼10
Popular vote	178,031	179,619	119,767
Percentage	29.7%	29.9%	20.0%
Swing	New party	▼12.1 pp	▼21.5 pp
	Fourth party
Leader	Jesús Iglesias
Party	IU–LV
Leader since	2007
Leader's seat	Central
Last election	4 seats, 9.7%
Seats won	4
Seat change	0
Popular vote	61,703
Percentage	10.3%
Swing	▲0.6%
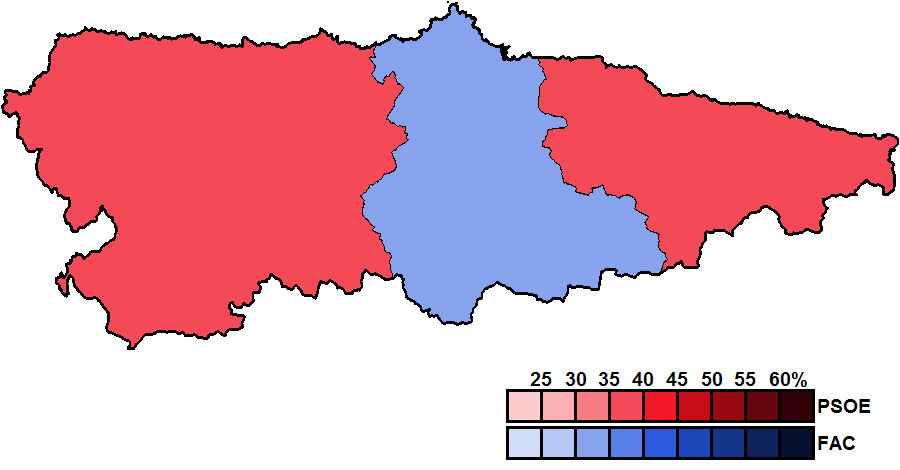
- Constituency results map for the General Junta of the Principality of Asturias
President before election
Vicente Álvarez Areces
PSOE
Elected President
Francisco Álvarez Cascos
FAC

The 2011 Asturian regional election was held on 22 May 2011 to elect the 8th General Junta of the Principality of Asturias. All 45 seats in the General Junta were up for election. It was held concurrently with regional elections in twelve other autonomous communities and local elections all throughout Spain.

Except for the 1995-1999 legislature, the Spanish Socialist Workers' Party (PSOE) had governed the autonomous community since the first election in 1983. However, in the 2011 election, the Asturias Forum (FAC), a split from the People's Party (PP), won the most seats despite PSOE obtaining more votes. The FAC was established on 19 January 2011 by Francisco Álvarez Cascos, former Deputy Prime Minister of Spain, after failing to be selected as PP's candidate. FAC gains came at the expense of the PP and the PSOE, but while PSOE's collapse had been predicted in early opinion polls, the PP had been widely expected to make strong gains before Cascos' split, instead scoring the worst result of its history. The Asturian Bloc (BA) had terminated its coalition with United Left (IU) and the Asturian Greens (LVA) in August 2010 and run separately, failing to win any seats. IU and the Greens maintained their coalition and retained their existing four seats.

Vicente Álvarez Areces, incumbent since 1999, did not seek re-election. As in Asturias it is not allowed for parties to vote against a proposed presidential candidate (instead being forced to either abstain or vote a candidate of their own), in July 2011, the PSOE and PP announced that they would abstain in the investiture voting of Álvarez Cascos, who thus became the new president at the head of a minority administration.

The resulting government, however, was not able to gather legislative support to approve its 2012 regional budget, with both PP and PSOE blocking the vote, resulting in a fresh election being held in March 2012.

== Overview ==
=== Electoral system ===
The General Junta of the Principality of Asturias was the devolved, unicameral legislature of the autonomous community of Asturias, having legislative power in regional matters as defined by the Spanish Constitution and the Asturian Statute of Autonomy, as well as the ability to vote confidence in or withdraw it from a regional president.

Voting for the General Junta was on the basis of universal suffrage, which comprised all nationals over 18 years of age, registered in Asturias and in full enjoyment of their political rights. Amendments to the electoral law in 2011 required for Asturians abroad to apply for voting before being permitted to vote, a system known as "begged" or expat vote (Spanish: Voto rogado). The 45 members of the General Junta of the Principality of Asturias were elected using the D'Hondt method and a closed list proportional representation, with an electoral threshold of three percent of valid votes—which included blank ballots—being applied in each constituency. Seats were allocated to constituencies, which were established by law as follows:

- Central District, comprising the municipalities of Aller, Avilés, Bimenes, Carreño, Caso, Castrillón, Corvera de Asturias, Gijón, Gozón, Illas, Las Regueras, Langreo, Laviana, Lena, Llanera, Mieres, Morcín, Noreña, Oviedo, Proaza, Quirós, Ribera de Arriba, Riosa, San Martín del Rey Aurelio, Santo Adriano, Sariego, Siero, Sobrescobio and Soto del Barco.
- Eastern District, comprising the municipalities of Amieva, Cabrales, Cabranes, Cangas de Onís, Caravia, Colunga, Llanes, Nava, Onís, Parres, Peñamellera Alta, Peñamellera Baja, Piloña, Ponga, Ribadedeva, Ribadesella and Villaviciosa.
- Western District, comprising the municipalities of Allande, Belmonte de Miranda, Boal, Candamo, Cangas del Narcea, Castropol, Coaña, Cudillero, Degaña, El Franco, Grado, Grandas de Salime, Ibias, Illano, Muros de Nalón, Navia, Pesoz, Pravia, Salas, San Martín de Oscos, Santa Eulalia de Oscos, San Tirso de Abres, Somiedo, Tapia de Casariego, Taramundi, Teverga, Tineo, Valdés, Vegadeo, Villanueva de Oscos, Villayón and Yernes y Tameza.

Each constituency was allocated an initial minimum of two seats, with the remaining 39 being distributed in proportion to their populations.

In smaller constituencies, the use of the electoral method resulted in an effective threshold based on the district magnitude and the distribution of votes among candidacies.

The electoral law allowed for parties and federations registered in the interior ministry, coalitions and groupings of electors to present lists of candidates. Parties and federations intending to form a coalition ahead of an election were required to inform the relevant Electoral Commission within ten days of the election call, whereas groupings of electors needed to secure the signature of at least one percent of the electorate in the constituencies for which they sought election, disallowing electors from signing for more than one list of candidates.

=== Election date ===
The term of the General Junta of the Principality of Asturias expired four years after the date of its previous election. Elections to the General Junta were fixed for the fourth Sunday of May every four years. The previous election was held on 27 May 2007, setting the election date for the General Junta on 22 May 2011.

The president had the prerogative to dissolve the General Junta and call a snap election, provided that no motion of no confidence was in process, no nationwide election was due and some time requirements were met: namely, that dissolution did not occur either during the first legislative session or within the legislature's last year ahead of its scheduled expiry, nor before one year had elapsed since a previous dissolution under this procedure. In the event of an investiture process failing to elect a regional president within a two-month period from the first ballot, the General Junta was to be automatically dissolved and a fresh election called. Any snap election held as a result of these circumstances would not alter the period to the next ordinary election, with elected lawmakers serving the remainder of its original four-year term.

== Background ==
On 7 July 2010, the President of Asturias, Vicente Álvarez Areces, announced that he would not seek re-election. Following the announcement, the General Secretary of the Asturian Socialist Federation (FSA), PSOE's regional branch, declared that he would seek the nomination to become the presidential candidate. His candidacy, supported by the FSA Executive Committee, was ratified by the PSOE Federal Committee on 23 October 2010.

United Left, coalition partner of the PSOE, decided that their regional General Coordinator, Jesús Sánchez Iglesias, would be its presidential candidate for a second consecutive time. His candidacy was supported by the IU Asturian Presidency in November 2010 and ratified by IU's political council in Asturias on 27 November 2010.

The Asturian Bloc ended its coalition with United Left and the Greens in October 2010 and contested the election in a joint electoral list with the Asturian Nationalist Unity (UNA) under the label Bloc for Asturias-UNA: Commitment for Asturias. BA's sole sitting deputy, Rafael Palacios, was their presidential candidate.

Oviedo city councillor Isabel Pérez-Espinosa was selected by the People's Party as its presidential candidate on 29 December 2010. This led to a split within the Asturian PP as former Deputy Prime Minister Francisco Álvarez-Cascos had been seeking the nomination. He resigned from the PP and formed the Asturias Forum, running to the election on his own.

== Opinion polls ==
The table below lists voting intention estimates in reverse chronological order, showing the most recent first and using the dates when the survey fieldwork was done, as opposed to the date of publication. Where the fieldwork dates are unknown, the date of publication is given instead. The highest percentage figure in each polling survey is displayed with its background shaded in the leading party's colour. If a tie ensues, this is applied to the figures with the highest percentages. The "Lead" column on the right shows the percentage-point difference between the parties with the highest percentages in a poll. When available, seat projections determined by the polling organisations are displayed below (or in place of) the percentages in a smaller font; 23 seats were required for an absolute majority in the General Junta of the Principality of Asturias.

Polling firm/Commissioner	Fieldwork date	Sample size	Turnout	PSOE	PP	IU	URAS PAS	UPyD	FAC	Lead
2011 regional election	22 May 2011	—N/a	61.7	29.9; 15	20.0; 10	10.3; 4	0.5; 0	2.4; 0	29.7; 16	0.2
Sigma Dos/El Mundo	10–12 May 2011	500	?	33.4; 17	24.2; 11/12	9.1; 3/4	–	–	25.8; 12/14	7.6
Asturbarómetro/El Comercio	4–11 May 2011	408	?	25.4; 16	15.1; 6	9.4; 3	–	–	42.8; 20	17.4
NC Report/La Razón (Note: "El PP doblega al PSOE a siete días de la cita electoral". La Razón (in Spanish). 15 May 2011. Archived from the original on 3 September 2011.)	3–10 May 2011	?	?	36.3; 17	28.4; 13/14	? 5	–	–	? 9/10	7.9
Ipsos/La Nueva España	29 Apr–9 May 2011	2,800	62.0	32.1; 16/17	30.1; 15/16	10.9; 4	–	–	19.7; 9	2.0
TNS Demoscopia/Antena 3	29 Apr–2 May 2011	500	?	31.2; 14/16	29.8; 14/15	10.4; 4/6	–	–	22.5; 10/11	1.4
Obradoiro de Socioloxía/Público	29 Apr–2 May 2011	1,200	?	36.8; 18/19	20.9; 10/11	9.2; 3/4	–	2.7; 0/1	25.5; 12/13	11.3
NC Report/La Razón	25 Apr 2011	?	?	? 18	24.3; 12	? 4	–	–	23.7; 11	?
Celeste-Tel/Terra	13–20 Apr 2011	400	?	31.1; 15	23.2; 12	11.2; 5	1.3; 0	–	26.3; 13	4.8
CIS	17 Mar–17 Apr 2011	1,188	?	35.7; 19	32.2; 16	8.2; 3	–	1.9; 0	15.0; 7	3.5
Asturbarómetro/El Comercio	11–16 Apr 2011	408	?	24.5; 13/15	15.3; 6/7	9.7; 4	–	–	43.1; 19/21	18.6
Sigma Dos/El Mundo	11–14 Apr 2011	500	?	33.6; 17	23.1; 11/12	11.4; 4	–	–	24.8; 12/13	8.8
Ikerfel/Vocento	4–11 Apr 2011	2,200	?	30.1; 14/16	29.6; 14/15	9.4; 3	–	2.8; 1	23.8; 11/12	0.5
Asturbarómetro	4–8 Apr 2011	?	?	23.5; 12/14	14.5; 6/7	9.5; 4	4.7; 1	–	42.5; 18/20	19.0
GAD/COPE	5–7 Apr 2011	400	?	32.0; 15	26.5; 13	11.5; 5	0.9; 0	–	25.2; 12	5.5
Asturbarómetro/El Comercio	12–19 Jan 2011	?	?	21.4	18.0	9.6	2.2	2.4	42.2	20.8
Sigma Dos/El Mundo	3 Jan 2011	500	?	27.3; 13/15	22.5; 10	8.1; 3	–	–	36.5; 17/19	9.2
Sigma Dos/El Mundo	3 Jan 2011	500	?	37.2; 18/19	46.8; 23/24	7.6; 3	–	–	–	9.6
NC Report/La Razón	30 Dec–3 Jan 2011	?	?	35.7; 18	45.2; 23	? 4	–	–	–	9.5
Asturbarómetro/El Comercio	31 Oct 2010	?	? (Note: Isabel Pérez-Espinosa as PP candidate hypothesis.)	41.6	37.8	9.7	2.8	2.2	–	3.8
Asturbarómetro/El Comercio	31 Oct 2010	?	? (Note: Francisco Álvarez-Cascos as PP candidate hypothesis.)	35.5	47.2	9.0	2.1	2.2	–	11.7
Sigma Dos/El Mundo	22–24 May 2010	700	?	36.4; 18/19	46.8; 23/24	8.4; 3	–	–	–	10.4
Obradoiro de Socioloxía/Público	8–15 Mar 2010	866	?	40.2; 20/21	43.3; 21/22	7.7; 3	–	2.9; 0	–	3.1
2009 EP election	7 Jun 2009	—N/a	44.1	44.1; 22	42.0; 20	5.6; 2	–	4.1; 1	–	2.1
2008 general election	9 Mar 2008	—N/a	71.3	46.9; 22	41.6; 20	7.2; 3	–	1.4; 0	–	5.3
2007 regional election	27 May 2007	—N/a	61.6	42.0; 21	41.5; 20	9.7; 4	2.2; 0	–	–	0.5

== Results ==
=== Overall ===
← Summary of the 22 May 2011 General Junta of the Principality of Asturias election results →
Parties and alliances	Popular vote			Seats	
Parties and alliances	Votes	%	±pp	Total	+/−
Spanish Socialist Workers' Party (PSOE)	179,619	29.92	−12.12	15	−6
Forum of Citizens (FAC)	178,031	29.66	New	16	+16
People's Party (PP)	119,767	19.95	−21.55	10	−10
United Left of Asturias–The Greens (IU–LV)	61,703	10.28	+0.59	4	±0
Union, Progress and Democracy (UPyD)	14,640	2.44	New	0	±0
Independents of Asturias (IDEAS)	6,380	1.06	New	0	±0
Bloc for Asturias–Asturian Nationalist Unity: Commitment for Asturias (BA–UNA)	6,191	1.03	New	0	±0
Left Front (FDLI)	4,598	0.77	New	0	±0
The Greens–Green Group (LV–GV)	3,626	0.60	New	0	±0
Asturian Renewal Union–Asturianist Party (URAS–PAS)	2,953	0.49	−1.73	0	±0
Anti-Bullfighting Party Against Mistreatment of Animals (PACMA)	1,950	0.32	New	0	±0
Communist Party of the Peoples of Spain (PCPE)	1,434	0.24	−0.09	0	±0
Open Council (Conceyu Abiertu)	1,421	0.24	New	0	±0
Constitutional and Democratic Party (PDyC)	1,034	0.17	New	0	±0
National Democracy (DN)	711	0.12	−0.03	0	±0
Liberal and Social Alternative (ALS)	334	0.06	New	0	±0
National Front–Republican Social Movement (FrN–MSR)	260	0.04	New	0	±0
Communist Unification of Spain (UCE)	11	0.00	New	0	±0
Blank ballots	15,611	2.60	+0.19		
Total	600,274			45	±0
Valid votes	600,274	98.56	−0.64		
Invalid votes	8,798	1.44	+0.64		
Votes cast / turnout	609,072	61.69	+0.10		
Abstentions	378,233	38.31	−0.10		
Registered voters	987,305				

Popular vote
PSOE	29.92%
FAC	29.66%
PP	19.95%
IU–LV	10.28%
UPyD	2.44%
IDEAS	1.06%
BA–UNA	1.03%
Others	3.05%
Blank ballots	2.60%

Seats
FAC	35.56%
PSOE	33.33%
PP	22.22%
IU–LV	8.89%

=== Distribution by constituency ===
Constituency	PSOE		FAC		PP		IU–LV	
Constituency	%	S	%	S	%	S	%	S
Central	28.4	11	30.1	12	19.1	7	11.2	4
Eastern	35.3	2	33.3	2	20.3	1	5.1	−
Western	36.6	2	24.6	2	25.1	2	7.8	−
Total	29.9	15	29.7	16	20.0	10	10.3	4

== Aftermath ==
Investiture
Ballot →	13 July 2011		15 July 2011	
Required majority →	23 out of 45		Simple	
Francisco Álvarez-Cascos (FAC): • FAC (16)	16 / 45	X mark	16 / 45	check
Abstentions: • PSOE (15); • PP (10); • IU–LV (4)	29 / 45		29 / 45	
Absentees	0 / 45		0 / 45	
