= Opinion polling for the 2015 Spanish local elections (Asturias) =

In the run up to the 2015 Spanish local elections, various organisations carried out opinion polling to gauge voting intention in local entities in Spain. Results of such polls for municipalities in Asturias are displayed in this article. The date range for these opinion polls is from the previous local elections, held on 22 May 2011, to the day the next elections were held, on 24 May 2015.

Polls are listed in reverse chronological order, showing the most recent first and using the dates when the survey fieldwork was done, as opposed to the date of publication. Where the fieldwork dates are unknown, the date of publication is given instead. The highest percentage figure in each polling survey is displayed with its background shaded in the leading party's colour. If a tie ensues, this is applied to the figures with the highest percentages. The "Lead" columns on the right shows the percentage-point difference between the parties with the highest percentages in a given poll.

== Municipalities ==
=== Avilés ===
Polling firm/Commissioner	Fieldwork date	Sample size	Turnout	PSOE	FAC	PP	IU–IX	Somos Avilés	C's	GAeC	Lead
2015 municipal election	24 May 2015	—N/a	61.0	26.7; 8	4.9; 0	21.9; 6	13.2; 3	16.7; 5	7.7; 2	5.4; 1	4.8
Ipsos/La Nueva España	17 May 2015	?	?	30.4; 8	10.1; 3	18.2; 5	9.8; 2	7.9; 2	11.0; 3	8.3; 2	12.2
2011 municipal election	22 May 2011	—N/a	64.2	33.8; 10	21.4; 6	20.9; 6	11.9; 3	–	–	–	12.4

=== Gijón ===
Polling firm/Commissioner	Fieldwork date	Sample size	Turnout	PSOE	FAC	PP	IU–IX	UPyD	Xixón Sí Puede	C's	Lead
2015 municipal election	24 May 2015	—N/a	62.5	24.8; 7	25.6; 8	10.7; 3	8.1; 2	0.8; 0	21.1; 6	5.7; 1	0.8
Ipsos/La Nueva España	17 May 2015	?	?	28.9; 9	28.0; 8	12.1; 3	8.3; 2	–	11.2; 3	6.4; 2	0.9
NC Report/AsturiasDiario	22 Mar 2014	350	58.3	29.7	29.9	16.4	12.4	–	–	–	0.2
2011 municipal election	22 May 2011	—N/a	66.1	31.6; 10	28.3; 9	18.8; 5	10.5; 3	4.1; 0	–	–	3.3

=== Langreo ===
Polling firm/Commissioner	Fieldwork date	Sample size	Turnout	PSOE	PP	FAC	IU–IX	FDLI	Somos Llangréu	C's	Lead
2015 municipal election	24 May 2015	—N/a	56.8	28.3; 6	14.0; 3	4.0; 0	24.8; 6	–	20.8; 5	5.2; 1	3.5
Ipsos/La Nueva España	17 May 2015	?	?	35.3; 8	16.2; 3	8.0; 2	15.0; 3	–	12.4; 3	6.1; 1	12.2
2011 municipal election	22 May 2011	—N/a	59.9	30.9; 7	18.2; 4	17.9; 4	17.0; 4	10.2; 2	–	–	12.7

=== Mieres ===
Polling firm/Commissioner	Fieldwork date	Sample size	Turnout	IU–IX	PSOE	PP	FAC	Somos Mieres	C's	Lead
2015 municipal election	24 May 2015	—N/a	59.8	49.1; 12	18.7; 4	13.1; 3	2.0; 0	11.9; 2	3.0; 0	30.4
Ipsos/La Nueva España	17 May 2015	?	?	43.0; 10	24.0; 5	16.3; 4	5.1; 1	5.0; 1	3.5; 0	19.0
2011 municipal election	22 May 2011	—N/a	64.0	41.5; 10	22.9; 5	18.8; 4	7.8; 2	–	–	18.6

=== Oviedo ===
Polling firm/Commissioner	Fieldwork date	Sample size	Turnout	PP	FAC	PSOE	IU–IX	UPyD	Somos Oviedo	C's	Vox	Lead
2015 municipal election	24 May 2015	—N/a	60.3	34.4; 11	3.9; 0	18.0; 5	9.2; 3	1.2; 0	19.0; 6	8.5; 2	1.4; 0	15.4
Ipsos/La Nueva España	17 May 2015	?	?	33.2; 9	7.1; 2	20.0; 6	11.8; 3	–	12.0; 3	13.2; 4	–	13.2
PP	16 May 2015	?	?	? 5/6	? 2/3	? 4	? 2	–	? 5/6	? 5/6	? 1/2	Tie
Sigma Dos/IU	18 Dec 2014	1,200	?	41.3; 13/14	4.8; 0/1	17.2; 5/6	15.1; 4	5.0; 1	14.0; 4	–	–	24.1
NC Report/AsturiasDiario	6 Apr 2014	?	?	? 9	? 6	? 6	? 4	? 2	–	–	–	?
2011 municipal election	22 May 2011	—N/a	65.8	33.8; 11	20.7; 7	20.3; 6	11.4; 3	3.9; 0	–	–	–	13.1

=== Siero ===
Polling firm/Commissioner	Fieldwork date	Sample size	Turnout	PSOE	FAC	PP	IU–IX	PVF	Conceyu	PINSI	Somos Siero	C's	Lead
2015 municipal election	24 May 2015	—N/a	59.2	24.6; 7	16.0; 5	12.5; 3	11.4; 3	5.7; 1	1.9; 0	5.3; 1	14.7; 4	5.3; 1	8.6
Ipsos/La Nueva España	17 May 2015	?	?	24.5; 7	23.0; 6	15.3; 4	10.1; 3	–	–	–	13.0; 3	9.2; 2	1.5
NC Report	Mar 2014	?	?	? 4/5	? 9/10	? 2/3	? 3/4	? 2	–	? 1	–	–	?
2011 municipal election	22 May 2011	—N/a	63.5	23.2; 7	20.6; 6	20.2; 6	9.9; 3	7.1; 2	5.1; 1	–	–	–	2.6
