= 2015 Asturian regional election =

Election in the Spanish region of Asturias

- 24 May 2015

All 45 seats in the General Junta of the Principality of Asturias 23 seats needed for a majority
- Opinion polls
- Registered: 988,057 ▼0.2%
- Turnout: 551,192 (55.8%) ▲4.7 pp
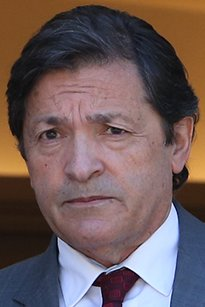

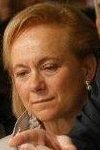

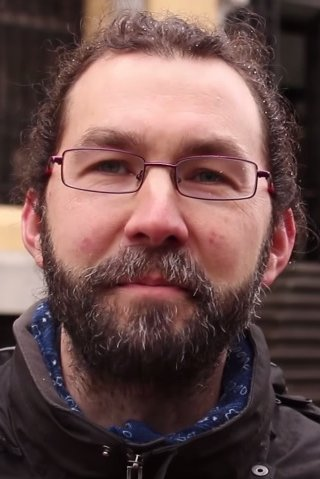

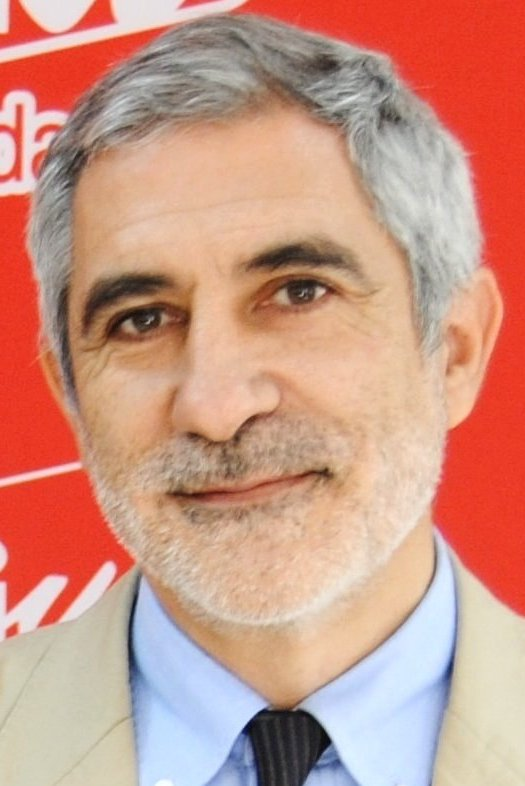

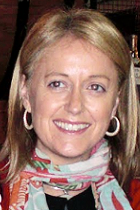

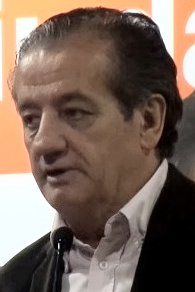
| | First party | Second party | Third party |
|---|---|---|---|
| Leader | Javier Fernández | Mercedes Fernández | Emilio León |
| Party | PSOE | PP | Podemos |
| Leader since | 23 October 2010 | 14 February 2012 | 1 April 2015 |
| Leader's seat | Central | Central | Central |
| Last election | 17 seats, 32.1% | 10 seats, 21.5% | Did not contest |
| Seats won | 14 | 11 | 9 |
| Seat change | ▼3 | ▲1 | ▲9 |
| Popular vote | 143,851 | 117,319 | 103,571 |
| Percentage | 26.5% | 21.6% | 19.1% |
| Swing | ▼5.6 pp | ▲0.8 pp | New party |
| | Fourth party | Fifth party | Sixth party |
| Leader | Gaspar Llamazares | Cristina Coto | Nicanor García |
| Party | IU | FAC | C's |
| Leader since | 24 January 2015 | 21 February 2015 | 18 April 2015 |
| Leader's seat | Central | Central | Central |
| Last election | 5 seats, 13.8% | 12 seats, 24.8% | Did not contest |
| Seats won | 5 | 3 | 3 |
| Seat change | 0 | ▼9 | ▲3 |
| Popular vote | 64,868 | 44,480 | 38,687 |
| Percentage | 11.9% | 8.2% | 7.1% |
| Swing | ▼1.9 pp | ▼16.6 pp | New party |
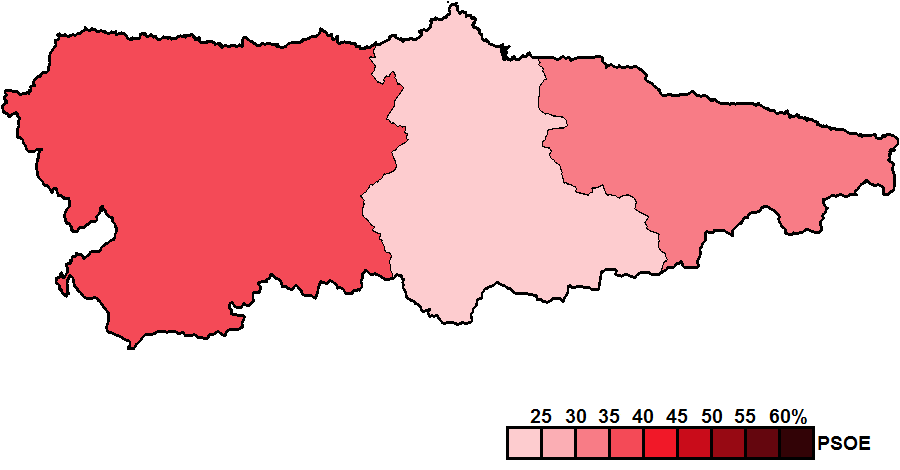
- Constituency results map for the General Junta of the Principality of Asturias
President before election
Javier Fernández
PSOE
Elected President
Javier Fernández
PSOE

The 2015 Asturian regional election was held on 24 May 2015 to elect the 10th General Junta of the Principality of Asturias. All 45 seats in the General Junta were up for election. Because regional elections in the Principality of Asturias were mandated for the fourth Sunday of May every four years, the 2012 snap election did not alter the term of the four-year legislature starting in 2011. It was held concurrently with regional elections in twelve other autonomous communities and local elections all throughout Spain.

Final results showed the Spanish Socialist Workers' Party (PSOE) with 26.5% of the vote (14 seats), the People's Party (PP) in second with 21.6% (11 seats) and newly created Podemos (Spanish for "We can") in a close third with 19.1% (9 seats). The Asturias Forum (FAC), which had ruled the community in the 2011–12 period, saw a dramatic loss of support, falling to fifth place with 8.2% and 3 seats, overcame by a stagnant United Left (IU/IX) and in a draw with up-and-coming Citizens (C's).

Socialist leader Javier Fernández was able to retain the regional government thanks to the support of United Left, after PP and FAC joined their votes against the PSOE and with Podemos supporting its own candidate.

== Overview ==
=== Electoral system ===
The General Junta of the Principality of Asturias was the devolved, unicameral legislature of the autonomous community of Asturias, having legislative power in regional matters as defined by the Spanish Constitution and the Asturian Statute of Autonomy, as well as the ability to vote confidence in or withdraw it from a regional president. Voting for the General Junta was on the basis of universal suffrage, which comprised all nationals over 18 years of age, registered in Asturias and in full enjoyment of their political rights. Additionally, Asturians abroad were required to apply for voting before being permitted to vote, a system known as "begged" or expat vote (Spanish: Voto rogado).

The 45 members of the General Junta of the Principality of Asturias were elected using the D'Hondt method and a closed list proportional representation, with an electoral threshold of three percent of valid votes—which included blank ballots—being applied in each constituency. Seats were allocated to constituencies, which were established as follows:

- Central District, comprising the municipalities of Aller, Avilés, Bimenes, Carreño, Caso, Castrillón, Corvera de Asturias, Gijón, Gozón, Illas, Las Regueras, Langreo, Laviana, Lena, Llanera, Mieres, Morcín, Noreña, Oviedo, Proaza, Quirós, Ribera de Arriba, Riosa, San Martín del Rey Aurelio, Santo Adriano, Sariego, Siero, Sobrescobio and Soto del Barco.
- Eastern District, comprising the municipalities of Amieva, Cabrales, Cabranes, Cangas de Onís, Caravia, Colunga, Llanes, Nava, Onís, Parres, Peñamellera Alta, Peñamellera Baja, Piloña, Ponga, Ribadedeva, Ribadesella and Villaviciosa.
- Western District, comprising the municipalities of Allande, Belmonte de Miranda, Boal, Candamo, Cangas del Narcea, Castropol, Coaña, Cudillero, Degaña, El Franco, Grado, Grandas de Salime, Ibias, Illano, Muros de Nalón, Navia, Pesoz, Pravia, Salas, San Martín de Oscos, Santa Eulalia de Oscos, San Tirso de Abres, Somiedo, Tapia de Casariego, Taramundi, Teverga, Tineo, Valdés, Vegadeo, Villanueva de Oscos, Villayón and Yernes y Tameza.

Each constituency was allocated an initial minimum of two seats, with the remaining 39 being distributed in proportion to their populations.

As a result of the aforementioned allocation, each General Junta constituency was entitled the following seats:

| Seats | Constituencies |
|---|---|
| 34 | Central District |
| 6 | Western District |
| 5 | Eastern District |

In smaller constituencies, the use of the electoral method resulted in an effective threshold based on the district magnitude and the distribution of votes among candidacies.

=== Election date ===
The term of the General Junta of the Principality of Asturias expired four years after the date of its previous election. Elections to the General Junta were fixed for the fourth Sunday of May every four years. The previous ordinary election was held on 22 May 2011, setting the election date for the General Junta on 24 May 2015.

The president had the prerogative to dissolve the General Junta and call a snap election, provided that no motion of no confidence was in process, no nationwide election was due and some time requirements were met: namely, that dissolution did not occur either during the first legislative session or within the legislature's last year ahead of its scheduled expiry, nor before one year had elapsed since a previous dissolution under this procedure. In the event of an investiture process failing to elect a regional president within a two-month period from the first ballot, the General Junta was to be automatically dissolved and a fresh election called. Any snap election held as a result of these circumstances would not alter the period to the next ordinary election, with elected lawmakers serving the remainder of its original four-year term.

The election to the General Junta of the Principality of Asturias was officially triggered on 31 March 2015 after the publication of the election decree in the Official Gazette of the Principality of Asturias (BOPA).

== Background ==
Following the 2012 election, regional PSOE leader Javier Fernández was able to be elected as President of Asturias thanks to a confidence and supply agreement with both IU-IX and UPyD. However, in November 2013 both parties announced they were withdrawing support from the government after the PSOE voted down a proposal to reform the autonomous community's electoral law (including, among other things, a removal of the three district-division of the Principality), leaving the regional government in minority. To prevent a parliamentary deadlock, however, the PSOE unexpectedly reached an agreement with the PP to obtain its parliamentary support to avoid political instability, in what was dubbed by opponents as the duerno agreement.

Incumbent Socialist Javier Fernández announced his intention to run for re-election to a second term in office, being chosen as his party's candidate without opposition. Opposition leader Francisco Álvarez-Cascos announced on 12 February 2015 that he would not stand again as Asturias Forum's candidate, with Cristina Coto being elected as the party's candidate and leader the following month. Mercedes Fernández was elected as People's Party candidate for a second consecutive time, while Gaspar Llamazares was proclaimed as the candidate for United Left after a primary election held on 24 January 2015.

Finally, Ignacio Prendes, the only deputy of Union, Progress and Democracy, was expelled from the party and will contest as the candidate of Citizens (C's). Adán Fernández will substitute him as the candidate of the party.

The election was influenced by the surge of two rising parties in opinion polls: Podemos (Spanish for We can), a left-wing party created in January 2014 to contest the 2014 European Parliament election and whose success brought it to establish itself as a fully-fledged party at the national level, and centrist Citizens (C's), whose rise in opinion polls early in 2015 and its success in the 2015 Andalusian election brought it at the center of media attention. Emilio León stood as Podemos' candidate after being elected in a primary election process held during the last weeks of March, Citizens will also run in the election, despite an early controversy resulted in the resignation of the former party's candidate Francisco Gambarte and the party staff considering whether to stand or not in the region. Nicanor García will be the candidate, while Ignacio Prendes, expelled from UPyD, was the second person in the list.

On 21 April, it was confirmed that 19 parties would take part in the election.

== Parliamentary composition ==
The table below shows the composition of the parliamentary groups in the General Junta at the time of the election call.

Parliamentary composition in March 2015
| Groups | Parties | Legislators | |
| Groups | Parties | Seats | Total |
|---|---|---|---|
| Socialist Parliamentary Group | PSOE | 17 | 17 |
| Asturias Forum Parliamentary Group | FAC | 12 | 12 |
| People's Parliamentary Group | PP | 10 | 10 |
| United Left Parliamentary Group | IU/IX | 5 | 5 |
| Mixed Parliamentary Group | UPyD | 1 | 1 |

== Parties and candidates ==
The electoral law allowed for parties and federations registered in the interior ministry, coalitions and groupings of electors to present lists of candidates. Parties and federations intending to form a coalition ahead of an election were required to inform the relevant Electoral Commission within ten days of the election call, whereas groupings of electors needed to secure the signature of at least one percent of the electorate in the constituencies for which they sought election, disallowing electors from signing for more than one list of candidates.

Below is a list of the main parties and electoral alliances which contested the election:

| Candidacy | Parties and alliances | Leading candidate | Ideology | Previous result | | Gov. | Ref. |
| Candidacy | Parties and alliances | Leading candidate | Ideology | Vote % | Seats | Gov. | Ref. |
|---|---|---|---|---|---|---|---|
| PSOE | List: Spanish Socialist Workers' Party (PSOE) | Javier Fernández | Social democracy | 32.1% | 17 | Yes | |
| FAC | List: Forum of Citizens (FAC) | Cristina Coto | Regionalism; Conservatism | 24.8% | 12 | No | |
| PP | List: People's Party (PP) | Mercedes Fernández | Conservatism; Christian democracy | 21.5% | 10 | No | |
| IU/IX | List: United Left of Asturias (IU/IX) – Communist Party of Asturias (PCA) – The Dawn Marxist Organization (La Aurora (OM)) – Republican Left (IR) – Open Left (IzAb) | Gaspar Llamazares | Socialism; Communism | 13.8% | 5 | No | |
| UPyD | List: Union, Progress and Democracy (UPyD) | Adán Fernández Veiguela | Social liberalism Radical centrism | 3.7% | 1 | No | |
| Podemos | List: We Can (Podemos) | Emilio León | Left-wing populism Direct democracy Democratic socialism | —N/a | | No | |
| C's | List: Citizens–Party of the Citizenry (C's) | Nicanor García | Liberalism | —N/a | | No | |

== Opinion polls ==
The table below lists voting intention estimates in reverse chronological order, showing the most recent first and using the dates when the survey fieldwork was done, as opposed to the date of publication. Where the fieldwork dates are unknown, the date of publication is given instead. The highest percentage figure in each polling survey is displayed with its background shaded in the leading party's colour. If a tie ensues, this is applied to the figures with the highest percentages. The "Lead" column on the right shows the percentage-point difference between the parties with the highest percentages in a poll. When available, seat projections determined by the polling organisations are displayed below (or in place of) the percentages in a smaller font; 23 seats were required for an absolute majority in the General Junta of the Principality of Asturias.

Color key:

Poll conducted after legal ban on opinion polls

| Polling firm/Commissioner | Fieldwork date | Sample size | Turnout | PSOE | FAC | PP | IU/IX | UPyD | Podemos | C's | Lead |
|---|---|---|---|---|---|---|---|---|---|---|---|
| 2015 regional election | 24 May 2015 | —N/a | 55.8 | 26.5; 14 | 8.2; 3 | 21.6; 11 | 11.9; 5 | 0.8; 0 | 19.1; 9 | 7.1; 3 | 4.9 |
| GAD3/Antena 3 | 11–22 May 2015 | ? | ? | ? 14/16 | ? 5/7 | ? 9/11 | ? 2/3 | – | ? 7/9 | ? 3/4 | ? |
| GAD3/ABC | 17 May 2015 | ? | ? | 29.1; 15/17 | 9.4; 4/5 | 21.9; 10/11 | 7.4; 3 | – | 15.7; 6/7 | 10.1; 4/5 | 7.2 |
| Ipsos/La Nueva España | 17 May 2015 | 1,800 | ? | 30.4; 14/15 | 10.3; 5/6 | 17.9; 8/9 | 11.5; 4/5 | – | 13.3; 5/6 | 12.6; 6/7 | 12.5 |
| NC Report/La Razón | 17 May 2015 | 400 | ? | 24.1; 12/13 | 11.7; 5/6 | 23.3; 11/12 | 8.7; 2/3 | 2.3; 0 | 14.0; 6/7 | 13.2; 6/7 | 0.8 |
| Intercampo/Podemos | 23–30 Apr 2015 | 1,500 | 63 | 27.0– 29.0; 11/14 | 7.0– 9.0; 2/3 | 18.0– 21.0; 9/11 | 8.0– 10.0; 3/4 | – | 18.0– 21.0; 9/11 | 14.0– 16.0; 7/8 | 8.0– 9.0 |
| CIS | 23 Mar–19 Apr 2015 | 1,198 | ? | 25.5; 13 | 10.0; 5 | 19.9; 11 | 6.7; 2 | 2.2; 0 | 21.4; 10 | 10.6; 4 | 4.1 |
| NC Report/La Razón | 16 Mar–1 Apr 2015 | 400 | ? | 23.4; 11/12 | 13.6; 6/7 | 23.1; 11/12 | 7.2; 2/3 | 2.7; 0 | 14.5; 6/7 | 13.1; 6/7 | 0.3 |
| PSOE | 28 Mar 2015 | ? | ? | ? 15/18 | ? 3 | ? 9/10 | ? 3 | ? 0/1 | ? 10/12 | – | ? |
| El Digital de Asturias | 24–28 Nov 2014 | 617 | ? | 27.3 | 22.1 | 19.3 | 8.3 | 3.6 | 14.0 (Note: Data for Somos Asturies.) | – | 5.2 |
| Llorente & Cuenca | 31 Oct 2014 | ? | ? | ? 12/14 | ? 6/9 | ? 12/14 | ? 4 | ? 2 | ? 5/7 | – | Tie |
| El Digital de Asturias | 1–10 Oct 2014 | 471 | ? | 25.4 | 21.5 | 18.0 | 5.8 | 3.1 | 20.6 | – | 3.9 |
| Asturbarómetro | 22 Jul–22 Aug 2014 | ? | ? | ? 16 | ? 4 | ? 14 | ? 4 | ? 1 | ? 6 | – | ? |
| RTPA | 23 Jul 2014 | 400 | ? | 24.1 | 14.6 | 23.8 | 8.3 | 3.6 | 18.7 | – | 0.3 |
| 2014 EP election | 25 May 2014 | —N/a | 39.0 | 26.1; 15 | 4.2; 1 | 24.2; 13 | 12.9; 7 | 6.0; 2 | 13.6; 7 | 2.5; 0 | 1.9 |
| PP | 12 Jan 2014 | ? | ? | ? 14 | ? 14 | ? 7 | ? 9 | ? 1 | – | – | Tie |
| SyM Consulting | 28 Nov–1 Dec 2013 | 608 | 65 | 27.8; 15/16 | 16.4; 8 | 15.2; 8/9 | 13.2; 6/7 | 14.5; 6/7 | – | – | 11.4 |
| NC Report/La Razón | 15 Oct–12 Nov 2013 | ? | ? | ? 15/16 | ? 14/15 | ? 7/8 | ? 6/7 | ? 1 | – | – | ? |
| PP | 11 May 2013 | ? | ? | ? 15/17 | ? 15/17 | ? 6/8 | ? 5/6 | ? 0/2 | – | – | Tie |
| NC Report/La Razón | 15 Apr–10 May 2013 | 200 | ? | 31.8; 16/17 | 26.5; 13/14 | 18.8; 9/10 | ? 6/7 | ? 1 | – | – | 5.3 |
| 2012 regional election | 25 Mar 2012 | —N/a | 51.1 | 32.1; 17 | 24.8; 12 | 21.5; 10 | 13.8; 5 | 3.7; 1 | – | – | 7.3 |

== Results ==
=== Overall ===
← Summary of the 24 May 2015 General Junta of the Principality of Asturias election results →
| Parties and alliances | Popular vote | | | Seats | |
| Parties and alliances | Votes | % | ±pp | Total | +/− |
|---|---|---|---|---|---|
| Spanish Socialist Workers' Party (PSOE) | 143,851 | 26.48 | −5.62 | 14 | −3 |
| People's Party (PP) | 117,319 | 21.59 | +0.06 | 11 | +1 |
| We Can (Podemos) | 103,571 | 19.06 | New | 9 | +9 |
| United Left of Asturias (IU/IX) | 64,868 | 11.94 | −1.83 | 5 | ±0 |
| Forum of Citizens (FAC) | 44,480 | 8.19 | −16.61 | 3 | −9 |
| Citizens–Party of the Citizenry (C's) | 38,687 | 7.12 | New | 3 | +3 |
| Union, Progress and Democracy (UPyD) | 4,358 | 0.80 | −2.94 | 0 | −1 |
| Animalist Party Against Mistreatment of Animals (PACMA) | 3,975 | 0.73 | +0.44 | 0 | ±0 |
| Blank Seats (EB) | 3,442 | 0.63 | −0.19 | 0 | ±0 |
| Vox (Vox) | 3,226 | 0.59 | New | 0 | ±0 |
| Equo (Equo) | 1,986 | 0.37 | −0.14 | 0 | ±0 |
| Andecha Astur (Andecha) | 990 | 0.18 | +0.05 | 0 | ±0 |
| Communist Party of the Peoples of Spain (PCPE) | 888 | 0.16 | ±0.00 | 0 | ±0 |
| Zero Cuts (Recortes Cero) | 417 | 0.08 | New | 0 | ±0 |
| Citizens' Democratic Renewal Movement (RED) | 364 | 0.07 | New | 0 | ±0 |
| Republican Social Movement (MSR) | 301 | 0.06 | +0.02 | 0 | ±0 |
| Asturian Renewal Union (URAS) | 249 | 0.05 | −0.04 | 0 | ±0 |
| Spanish Phalanx of the CNSO (FE–JONS) | 59 | 0.01 | New | 0 | ±0 |
| Humanist Party (PH) | 43 | 0.01 | ±0.00 | 0 | ±0 |
| Blank ballots | 10,271 | 1.89 | +0.46 | | |
| Total | 543,345 | | | 45 | ±0 |
| Valid votes | 543,345 | 98.58 | −0.57 | | |
| Invalid votes | 7,847 | 1.42 | +0.57 | | |
| Votes cast / turnout | 551,192 | 55.79 | +4.64 | | |
| Abstentions | 436,865 | 44.21 | −4.64 | | |
| Registered voters | 988,057 | | | | |

Popular vote
| PSOE | 26.48% |
| PP | 21.59% |
| Podemos | 19.06% |
| IU/IX | 11.94% |
| FAC | 8.19% |
| C's | 7.12% |
| Others | 3.74% |
| Blank ballots | 1.89% |

Seats
| PSOE | 31.11% |
| PP | 24.44% |
| Podemos | 20.00% |
| IU/IX | 11.11% |
| FAC | 6.67% |
| C's | 6.67% |

=== Distribution by constituency ===
| Constituency | PSOE | | PP | | Podemos | | IU/IX | | FAC | | C's | |
| Constituency | % | S | % | S | % | S | % | S | % | S | % | S |
|---|---|---|---|---|---|---|---|---|---|---|---|---|
| Central | 24.6 | 9 | 20.4 | 7 | 20.3 | 7 | 13.1 | 5 | 7.8 | 3 | 7.9 | 3 |
| Eastern | 33.0 | 2 | 26.9 | 2 | 13.2 | 1 | 6.0 | − | 12.3 | − | 4.1 | − |
| Western | 35.5 | 3 | 26.6 | 2 | 14.2 | 1 | 7.7 | − | 8.3 | − | 3.3 | − |
| Total | 26.5 | 14 | 21.6 | 11 | 19.1 | 9 | 11.9 | 5 | 8.2 | 3 | 7.1 | 3 |

== Aftermath ==
Investiture
| Ballot → | 1 July 2015 | | 3 July 2015 | | 21 July 2015 | |
| Required majority → | 23 out of 45 | | Simple | | Simple | |
| Javier Fernández (PSOE): • PSOE (14); • IU/IX (5) (on 21 Jul) | 14 / 45 | X mark | 14 / 45 | X mark | 19 / 45 | check |
| Mercedes Fernández (PP): • PP (11); • FAC (3) (from 3 Jul) | 11 / 45 | X mark | 14 / 45 | X mark | 14 / 45 | X mark |
| Emilio León (Podemos): • Podemos (9) (on 1 Jul) | 9 / 45 | X mark | Eliminated | | | |
| Abstentions: • Podemos (9) (from 3 Jul); • IU/IX (5) (until 3 Jul); • FAC (3) (1 Jul); • C's (3) | 11 / 45 | | 17 / 45 | | 12 / 45 | |
| Absentees | 0 / 45 | | 0 / 45 | | 0 / 45 | |
