= 2007 Asturian regional election =

Election in the Spanish region of Asturias

- 27 May 2007

All 45 seats in the General Junta of the Principality of Asturias 23 seats needed for a majority
- Opinion polls
- Registered: 981,802 ▲0.6%
- Turnout: 604,682 (61.6%) ▼2.2 pp
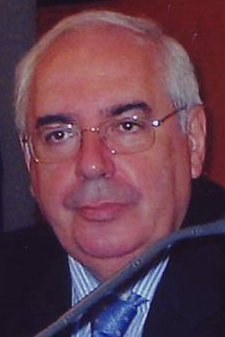

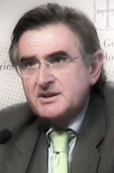

	First party	Second party	Third party
Leader	Vicente Álvarez Areces	Ovidio Sánchez	Jesús Iglesias
Party	PSOE	PP	IU–BA–LV
Leader since	14 June 1998	9 December 1998	2007
Leader's seat	Central	Central	Central
Last election	22 seats, 40.5%	19 seats, 39.2%	4 seats, 12.1% (Note: Results for IU–BA (11.05%, 4 seats) and LV–IVA (1.06%, 0 seats) in the 2003 election.)
Seats won	21	20	4
Seat change	▼1	▲1	0
Popular vote	252,201	248,907	58,114
Percentage	42.0%	41.5%	9.7%
Swing	▲1.5 pp	▲2.3 pp	▼2.4 pp
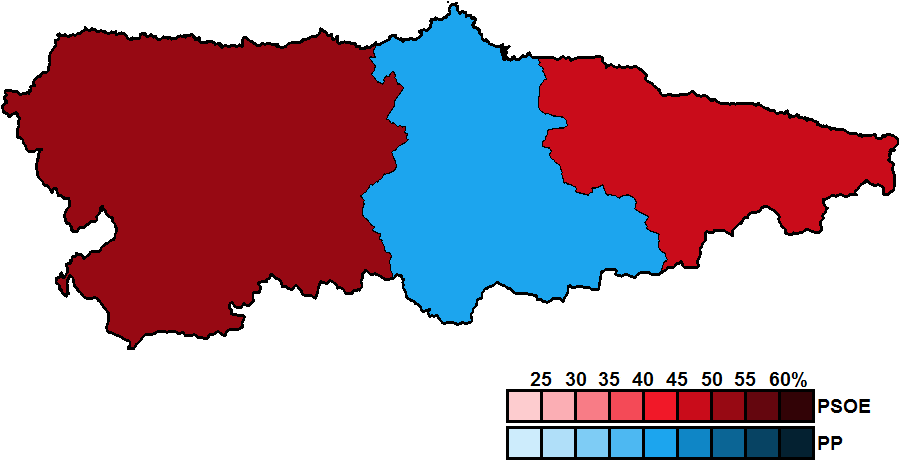
- Constituency results map for the General Junta of the Principality of Asturias
President before election
Vicente Álvarez Areces
PSOE
Elected President
Vicente Álvarez Areces
PSOE

The 2007 Asturian regional election was held on 27 May 2007 to elect the 7th General Junta of the Principality of Asturias. All 45 seats in the General Junta were up for election. It was held concurrently with regional elections in twelve other autonomous communities and local elections all throughout Spain.

== Overview ==
=== Electoral system ===
The General Junta of the Principality of Asturias was the devolved, unicameral legislature of the autonomous community of Asturias, having legislative power in regional matters as defined by the Spanish Constitution and the Asturian Statute of Autonomy, as well as the ability to vote confidence in or withdraw it from a regional president.

Voting for the General Junta was on the basis of universal suffrage, which comprised all nationals over 18 years of age, registered in Asturias and in full enjoyment of their political rights. The 45 members of the General Junta of the Principality of Asturias were elected using the D'Hondt method and a closed list proportional representation, with an electoral threshold of three percent of valid votes—which included blank ballots—being applied in each constituency. Seats were allocated to constituencies, which were established by law as follows:

- Central District, comprising the municipalities of Aller, Avilés, Bimenes, Carreño, Caso, Castrillón, Corvera de Asturias, Gijón, Gozón, Illas, Las Regueras, Langreo, Laviana, Lena, Llanera, Mieres, Morcín, Noreña, Oviedo, Proaza, Quirós, Ribera de Arriba, Riosa, San Martín del Rey Aurelio, Santo Adriano, Sariego, Siero, Sobrescobio and Soto del Barco.
- Eastern District, comprising the municipalities of Amieva, Cabrales, Cabranes, Cangas de Onís, Caravia, Colunga, Llanes, Nava, Onís, Parres, Peñamellera Alta, Peñamellera Baja, Piloña, Ponga, Ribadedeva, Ribadesella and Villaviciosa.
- Western District, comprising the municipalities of Allande, Belmonte de Miranda, Boal, Candamo, Cangas del Narcea, Castropol, Coaña, Cudillero, Degaña, El Franco, Grado, Grandas de Salime, Ibias, Illano, Muros de Nalón, Navia, Pesoz, Pravia, Salas, San Martín de Oscos, Santa Eulalia de Oscos, San Tirso de Abres, Somiedo, Tapia de Casariego, Taramundi, Teverga, Tineo, Valdés, Vegadeo, Villanueva de Oscos, Villayón and Yernes y Tameza.

Each constituency was allocated an initial minimum of two seats, with the remaining 39 being distributed in proportion to their populations.

In smaller constituencies, the use of the electoral method resulted in an effective threshold based on the district magnitude and the distribution of votes among candidacies.

The electoral law allowed for parties and federations registered in the interior ministry, coalitions and groupings of electors to present lists of candidates. Parties and federations intending to form a coalition ahead of an election were required to inform the relevant Electoral Commission within ten days of the election call, whereas groupings of electors needed to secure the signature of at least one percent of the electorate in the constituencies for which they sought election, disallowing electors from signing for more than one list of candidates.

=== Election date ===
The term of the General Junta of the Principality of Asturias expired four years after the date of its previous election. Elections to the General Junta were fixed for the fourth Sunday of May every four years. The previous election was held on 25 May 2003, setting the election date for the General Junta on 27 May 2007.

The president had the prerogative to dissolve the General Junta and call a snap election, provided that no motion of no confidence was in process, no nationwide election was due and some time requirements were met: namely, that dissolution did not occur either during the first legislative session or within the legislature's last year ahead of its scheduled expiry, nor before one year had elapsed since a previous dissolution under this procedure. In the event of an investiture process failing to elect a regional president within a two-month period from the first ballot, the General Junta was to be automatically dissolved and a fresh election called. Any snap election held as a result of these circumstances would not alter the period to the next ordinary election, with elected lawmakers serving the remainder of its original four-year term.

== Opinion polls ==
The table below lists voting intention estimates in reverse chronological order, showing the most recent first and using the dates when the survey fieldwork was done, as opposed to the date of publication. Where the fieldwork dates are unknown, the date of publication is given instead. The highest percentage figure in each polling survey is displayed with its background shaded in the leading party's colour. If a tie ensues, this is applied to the figures with the highest percentages. The "Lead" column on the right shows the percentage-point difference between the parties with the highest percentages in a poll. When available, seat projections determined by the polling organisations are displayed below (or in place of) the percentages in a smaller font; 23 seats were required for an absolute majority in the General Junta of the Principality of Asturias.

Color key:

Exit poll

Polling firm/Commissioner	Fieldwork date	Sample size	Turnout	PSOE	PP	IU	URAS PAS	Lead
2007 regional election	27 May 2007	—N/a	61.6	42.0; 21	41.5; 20	9.7; 4	2.2; 0	0.5
Ipsos/RTVE–FORTA	27 May 2007	?	?	44.1; 21/24	37.2; 18/20	11.1; 4/5	–	6.9
Ipsos/La Nueva España	20 May 2007	?	67	? 21	? 19	? 4	? 1	?
Celeste-Tel/Terra	9–15 May 2007	?	?	39.7; 20	37.8; 19	13.5; 6	–	1.9
InvesMark/El Comercio	4–14 May 2007	1,600	61.2	40.2; 19/21	41.2; 20/21	10.8; 4	3.2; 0/1	1.0
Sigma Dos/El Mundo	27 Apr–8 May 2007	600	?	40.2; 18/20	43.5; 21/23	11.1; 4	–	3.3
CIS	9 Apr–6 May 2007	1,197	?	40.2; 21	36.0; 19	13.2; 5	–	4.2
Noxa/IU	22 Mar 2007	?	?	38.9; 20	38.8; 19	15.7; 6	–	0.1
Sigma Dos/El Mundo	16–24 Nov 2006	?	?	41.0; 19/21	42.9; 20/22	11.1; 4	–	1.9
2004 EP election	13 Jun 2004	—N/a	44.9	46.4	44.4	6.3	0.5	2.0
2004 general election	14 Mar 2004	—N/a	71.7	43.4	43.8	8.4	0.6	0.4
2003 regional election	25 May 2003	—N/a	63.8	40.5; 22	39.2; 19	11.0; 4	4.7; 0	1.3

== Results ==
=== Overall ===
← Summary of the 27 May 2007 General Junta of the Principality of Asturias election results →
Parties and alliances	Popular vote			Seats	
Parties and alliances	Votes	%	±pp	Total	+/−
Spanish Socialist Workers' Party (PSOE)	252,201	42.04	+1.56	21	−1
People's Party (PP)	248,907	41.50	+2.32	20	+1
United Left–Bloc for Asturias–The Greens of Asturias (IU–BA–LV)^{1}	58,114	9.69	−2.42	4	±0
Asturian Renewal Union–Asturianist Party (URAS–PAS)^{2}	13,314	2.22	−2.46	0	±0
Unity (Unidá)	4,119	0.69	New	0	±0
Andecha Astur (AA)	2,770	0.46	−0.16	0	±0
Communist Party of the Peoples of Spain (PCPE)	2,001	0.33	+0.13	0	±0
Republican Left (IR)	1,707	0.28	New	0	±0
National Democracy (DN)	884	0.15	New	0	±0
Asturian Council (Conceyu)	782	0.13	+0.05	0	±0
Asturian Democratic Convergence (CDAS)	581	0.10	+0.04	0	±0
Blank ballots	14,458	2.41	+0.12		
Total	599,838			45	±0
Valid votes	599,838	99.20	−0.09		
Invalid votes	4,844	0.80	+0.09		
Votes cast / turnout	604,682	61.59	−2.25		
Abstentions	377,120	38.41	+2.25		
Registered voters	981,802				
Sources
Footnotes: ^{1} United Left–Bloc for Asturias–The Greens of Asturias results are compared to the combined totals of United Left–Bloc for Asturias and The Greens–Green Left of Asturias in the 2003 election.; ^{2} Asturian Renewal Union–Asturianist Party results are compared to the combined totals of Asturian Renewal Union and Asturianist Party in the 2003 election.

Popular vote
PSOE	42.04%
PP	41.50%
IU–BA–LV	9.69%
URAS–PAS	2.22%
Others	2.14%
Blank ballots	2.41%

Seats
PSOE	46.67%
PP	44.44%
IU–BA–LV	8.89%

=== Distribution by constituency ===
Constituency	PSOE		PP		IU–BA–LV	
Constituency	%	S	%	S	%	S
Central	40.2	15	42.0	15	10.6	4
Eastern	46.3	3	41.9	2	5.6	−
Western	50.2	3	38.2	3	6.9	−
Total	42.0	21	41.5	20	9.7	4

== Aftermath ==
Investiture
Ballot →	6 July 2007		9 July 2007	
Required majority →	23 out of 45		Simple	
Vicente Álvarez Areces (PSOE): • PSOE (21)	21 / 45	X mark	21 / 45	check
Abstentions: • PP (19); • IU–BA–LV (4)	23 / 45		23 / 45	
Absentees: • PP (1)	1 / 45		1 / 45	
