= 2015 Spanish local elections in Asturias =

This article presents the results breakdown of the local elections held in Asturias on 24 May 2015. The following tables show detailed results in the autonomous community's most populous municipalities, sorted alphabetically.

== City control ==
The following table lists party control in the most populous municipalities, including provincial capitals (shown in bold). Gains for a party are displayed with the cell's background shaded in that party's colour.

Municipality	Population	Previous control	New control
Avilés	81,659	Spanish Socialist Workers' Party (PSOE)	Spanish Socialist Workers' Party (PSOE)
Gijón	275,735	Forum of Citizens (FAC)	Forum of Citizens (FAC)
Langreo	42,403	Spanish Socialist Workers' Party (PSOE)	United Left of Asturias (IU/IX)
Mieres	41,013	United Left of Asturias (IU/IX)	United Left of Asturias (IU/IX)
**Oviedo**	223,765	People's Party (PP)	Spanish Socialist Workers' Party (PSOE)
San Martín del Rey Aurelio	17,460	Spanish Socialist Workers' Party (PSOE)	Spanish Socialist Workers' Party (PSOE)
Siero	52,380	Spanish Socialist Workers' Party (PSOE)	Spanish Socialist Workers' Party (PSOE)

== Municipalities ==
=== Avilés ===
Population: 81,659

← Summary of the 24 May 2015 City Council of Avilés election results →
Parties and alliances	Popular vote			Seats	
Parties and alliances	Votes	%	±pp	Total	+/−
Spanish Socialist Workers' Party (PSOE)	10,901	26.70	−7.14	8	−2
People's Party (PP)	8,931	21.87	+0.92	6	±0
We Are Avilés (Somos Avilés)	6,835	16.74	New	5	+5
United Left of Asturias (IU/IX)	5,383	13.18	+1.29	3	±0
Citizens–Party of the Citizenry (C's)	3,147	7.71	New	2	+2
Let's Win Avilés in Common (Ganemos)	2,215	5.42	New	1	+1
Forum of Citizens (FAC)	1,993	4.88	−16.52	0	−6
Blank Seats (EB)	413	1.01	New	0	±0
Communist Party of the Peoples of Spain (PCPE)	146	0.36	−0.10	0	±0
Blank ballots	871	2.13	−0.84		
Total	40,835			25	±0
Valid votes	40,835	98.70	+0.11		
Invalid votes	536	1.30	−0.11		
Votes cast / turnout	41,371	61.01	−3.19		
Abstentions	26,444	38.99	+3.19		
Registered voters	67,815				

=== Gijón ===
Population: 275,735

← Summary of the 24 May 2015 City Council of Gijón election results →
Parties and alliances	Popular vote			Seats	
Parties and alliances	Votes	%	±pp	Total	+/−
Forum of Citizens (FAC)	36,235	25.59	−2.68	8	−1
Spanish Socialist Workers' Party (PSOE)	35,105	24.80	−6.79	7	−3
Gijón Can (Xixón Sí Puede)	29,870	21.10	New	6	+6
People's Party (PP)	15,214	10.75	−8.05	3	−2
United Left of Asturias (IU/IX)	11,533	8.15	−2.39	2	−1
Citizens–Party of the Citizenry (C's)	8,086	5.71	New	1	+1
Blank Seats (EB)	1,276	0.90	New	0	±0
Union, Progress and Democracy (UPyD)	1,194	0.84	−3.25	0	±0
Andecha Astur (Andecha)	392	0.28	New	0	±0
Citizens' Democratic Renewal Movement (RED)	365	0.26	New	0	±0
Communist Party of the Peoples of Spain (PCPE)	293	0.21	−0.05	0	±0
Blank ballots	2,015	1.42	−0.91		
Total	141,578			27	±0
Valid votes	141,578	99.10	+0.11		
Invalid votes	1,281	0.90	−0.11		
Votes cast / turnout	142,859	62.49	−3.60		
Abstentions	85,753	37.51	+3.60		
Registered voters	228,612				

=== Langreo ===
Population: 42,403

← Summary of the 24 May 2015 City Council of Langreo election results →
Parties and alliances	Popular vote			Seats	
Parties and alliances	Votes	%	±pp	Total	+/−
Spanish Socialist Workers' Party (PSOE)	5,636	28.25	−2.61	6	−1
United Left of Asturias (IU/IX)	4,952	24.82	+7.85	6	+2
We Are Langreo (Somos Langreo)	4,140	20.75	New	5	+5
People's Party (PP)	2,792	14.00	−4.19	3	−1
Citizens–Party of the Citizenry (C's)	1,030	5.16	New	1	+1
Forum of Citizens (FAC)	793	3.98	−13.94	0	−4
Communist Party of the Peoples of Spain (PCPE)	107	0.54	New	0	±0
Left Front (FDLI)	n/a	n/a	−10.15	0	−2
Blank ballots	498	2.50	−0.37		
Total	19,948			21	±0
Valid votes	19,948	97.80	+0.08		
Invalid votes	449	2.20	−0.08		
Votes cast / turnout	20,397	56.79	−3.13		
Abstentions	15,518	43.21	+3.13		
Registered voters	35,915				

=== Mieres ===
Population: 41,013

← Summary of the 24 May 2015 City Council of Mieres election results →
Parties and alliances	Popular vote			Seats	
Parties and alliances	Votes	%	±pp	Total	+/−
United Left of Asturias (IU/IX)	10,215	49.06	+7.52	12	+2
Spanish Socialist Workers' Party (PSOE)	3,903	18.75	−4.19	4	−1
People's Party (PP)	2,719	13.06	−5.72	3	−1
We Are Mieres (Somos Mieres)	2,468	11.85	New	2	+2
Citizens–Party of the Citizenry (C's)	616	2.96	New	0	±0
Forum of Citizens (FAC)	420	2.02	−5.79	0	−2
Communist Party of the Peoples of Spain (PCPE)	146	0.70	+0.43	0	±0
Blank ballots	333	1.60	−0.46		
Total	20,820			21	±0
Valid votes	20,820	98.57	−0.27		
Invalid votes	301	1.43	+0.27		
Votes cast / turnout	21,121	59.75	−4.20		
Abstentions	14,227	40.25	+4.20		
Registered voters	35,348				

=== Oviedo ===
Population: 223,765

← Summary of the 24 May 2015 City Council of Oviedo election results →
Parties and alliances	Popular vote			Seats	
Parties and alliances	Votes	%	±pp	Total	+/−
People's Party (PP)	36,962	34.39	+0.60	11	±0
We Are Oviedo (Somos Oviedo)	20,459	19.04	New	6	+6
Spanish Socialist Workers' Party (PSOE)	19,383	18.04	−2.27	5	−1
United Left of Asturias (IU/IX)	9,917	9.23	−2.16	3	±0
Citizens–Party of the Citizenry (C's)	9,099	8.47	New	2	+2
Forum of Citizens (FAC)	4,173	3.88	−16.79	0	−7
Vox (Vox)	1,479	1.38	New	0	±0
Union, Progress and Democracy (UPyD)	1,335	1.24	−2.67	0	±0
Blank Seats (EB)	971	0.90	New	0	±0
Equo (Equo)	971	0.90	New	0	±0
Andecha Astur (Andecha)	236	0.22	New	0	±0
Internationalist Solidarity and Self-Management (SAIn)	180	0.17	+0.02	0	±0
Humanist Party (PH)	134	0.12	New	0	±0
Communist Party of the Peoples of Spain (PCPE)	125	0.12	−0.07	0	±0
Blank ballots	2,041	1.90	−1.20		
Total	107,465			27	±0
Valid votes	107,465	98.93	+0.24		
Invalid votes	1,162	1.07	−0.24		
Votes cast / turnout	108,627	60.34	−5.43		
Abstentions	71,400	39.66	+5.43		
Registered voters	180,027				

=== San Martín del Rey Aurelio ===
Population: 17,460

← Summary of the 24 May 2015 City Council of San Martín del Rey Aurelio election results →
Parties and alliances	Popular vote			Seats	
Parties and alliances	Votes	%	±pp	Total	+/−
Spanish Socialist Workers' Party (PSOE)	3,470	38.25	−0.44	7	±0
United Left of Asturias (IU/IX)	2,258	24.89	+4.14	5	+1
We Are San Martín del Rey Aurelio (Somos Samartín del Rei Aurelio)	1,763	19.44	New	3	+3
People's Party (PP)	1,137	12.53	−12.55	2	−3
Forum of Citizens (FAC)	277	3.05	−5.57	0	−1
Blank ballots	166	1.83	−0.17		
Total	9,071			17	±0
Valid votes	9,071	97.81	+0.11		
Invalid votes	203	2.19	−0.11		
Votes cast / turnout	9,274	62.12	−4.25		
Abstentions	5,654	37.88	+4.25		
Registered voters	14,928				

=== Siero ===
Population: 52,380

← Summary of the 24 May 2015 City Council of Siero election results →
Parties and alliances	Popular vote			Seats	
Parties and alliances	Votes	%	±pp	Total	+/−
Spanish Socialist Workers' Party (PSOE)	6,204	24.62	+1.42	7	±0
Forum of Citizens (FAC)	4,025	15.97	−4.67	5	−1
We Are Siero (Somos Siero)	3,697	14.67	New	4	+4
People's Party (PP)	3,149	12.50	−7.65	3	−3
United Left of Asturias (IU/IX)	2,876	11.41	+1.52	3	±0
La Fresneda Local Platform (PVF)	1,439	5.71	−1.40	1	−1
Citizens–Party of the Citizenry (C's)	1,338	5.31	New	1	+1
Independent Party of Siero (PINSI)	1,336	5.30	+0.31	1	+1
Asturian Council (Conceyu)	477	1.89	−3.22	0	−1
Vox (Vox)	137	0.54	New	0	±0
Blank ballots	519	2.06	−0.98		
Total	25,197			25	±0
Valid votes	25,197	98.46	+0.20		
Invalid votes	394	1.54	−0.20		
Votes cast / turnout	25,591	59.20	−4.34		
Abstentions	17,640	40.80	+4.34		
Registered voters	43,231				

== See also ==
- 2015 Asturian regional election
