= Javier Fernández (Spanish politician) =

Spanish politician (born 1948)

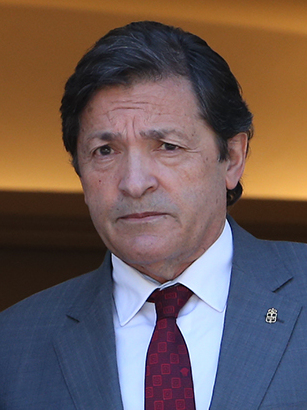

8th President of the Principality of Asturias Elections: 2012, 2015
- In office 26 May 2012 – 16 July 2019
- Monarchs: Juan Carlos I Felipe VI
- Preceded by: Francisco Álvarez Cascos
- Succeeded by: Adrián Barbón

President of the Spanish Socialist Workers' Party Caretaking Committee
- In office 1 October 2016 – 18 June 2017
- Preceded by: Pedro Sánchez (as Secretary General)
- Succeeded by: Pedro Sánchez (as Secretary General)

Member of the Congress of Deputies
- In office 3 March 1996 – 22 July 1999
- Constituency: Asturias

Member of the Senate
- In office 14 July 2003 – 25 May 2012
- Constituency: Asturias

Member of the General Junta of the Principality of Asturias
- In office 27 May 2007 – 24 June 2019
- Constituency: Central Asturias

Personal details
- Born: 7 January 1948 (age 78) Mieres, Asturias, Spain
- Party: PSOE

Javier Fernández Fernández (born 7 January 1948 in Mieres, Asturias) is a Spanish politician, mining engineer, and civil servant. He was the secretary general of the Federación Socialista Asturiana, the regional socialist party affiliated with the national Spanish Socialist Workers' Party (PSOE).

Fernández served as the President of the Principality of Asturias from 26 May 2012 to 16 July 2019. He came to power as the result of a coalition government stemming from the 2012 Asturias General Council election held in March. A parliamentary pact was made between the PSOE and the centrist Union, Progress and Democracy (UPyD). Fernández was elected president on 23 May 2012, and took office three days later. He appointed five women and three men to his cabinet, including economist Dolores Carcedo as the Minister of Finance.

He retained the Presidency after the 2015 election, but governing in minority only with the support of the United Left of Asturias.

On 1 October 2016, Fernández was named by PSOE to lead the party's caretaker committee, after the resignation of Pedro Sánchez as secretary general.

Political offices
Preceded by Juan José Tielve Cuervo	Councillor of Industry, Trade and Tourism of Asturias; 1999–2000	Succeeded by Jesús Urrutia García
Preceded by Francisco Álvarez Cascos	President of the Principality of Asturias; 2012-2019	Succeeded by Adrián Barbón
Party political offices
Preceded by Luis Martínez Noval	Secretary-General of the Asturian Socialist Federation; 2000–2017	Succeeded by Adrián Barbón
Preceded by Pedro Sánchez as Secretary-General	President of the Spanish Socialist Workers' Party caretaker committee 2016–2017	Succeeded by Pedro Sánchez as Secretary-General
