= Conceyu Abiertu =

- Spokesperson: Collective leadership
- Founded: 2011
- Headquarters: Xixón
- Ideology: Asturian nationalism Socialism; Ecologism; Municipalism
- Union affiliation: Corriente Sindical d'Izquierda
- Local Government: 1 / 918

Website
- conceyuabiertu.org

Conceyu Abiertu (Open Council or Open Municipality in Asturian language) is an Asturian political organization of left-wing and Asturian nationalist ideology. Conceyu Abiertu emerged as a municipalist platform in the municipal and regional elections of 2011.

== History ==
Conceyu Abiertu emerged in late 2010 on the initiative of people from various political parties, trade unions, social movements and youth organizations of Asturias, like Andecha Astur, Darréu, the Corriente Sindical d'Izquierda, Fai! Asturies and independents. The aim of forming this platform was the need for unity of the different areas of the nationalist and Asturian left, to stop the stagnation that this political movement was suffering. It was officially presented on January 19, 2011 in the auditorium of the Jovellanos Library, Xixón.

Conceyu Abiertu first participated in the municipal and regional elections of 2011, both with a regional list, that failed to enter the parliament, and candidates for council level representation. In Xixón, the organizations supported a list called Conceyu d'Unidá Popular de Xixón (CUPX), which brought together the local anti-capitalist Left, including the Communist Party of Asturias (PCA) and independents. Conceyu Abiertu achieved a representative in Noreña.

== Municipalities ==
Conceyu Abiertu is a non-centralized organization, based in local assemblies, modeled on the Catalan Candidatura d'Unitat Popular (CUP), with the National Council as the federative and unifying element. Currently present in ten Asturian municipalities: Grao, Langreo, Mieres, Noreña, Ribadesella, San Martín del Rey Aurelio, Siero, Oviedo, Villaviciosa and Gijón.
