= Compromisu por Asturies =

- Spokesperson: Daniel Fernández
- Founded: 2011
- Headquarters: Oviedo
- Ideology: Asturian nationalism Democratic socialism Ecologism
- Union affiliation: Corriente Sindical d'Izquierda
- Local Government: 4 / 922

Website
- compromisu.com

Compromisu por Asturies (Commitment to/for Asturies in Asturian language) is an Asturian political organization of left-wing and Asturian nationalist ideology. Compromisu por Asturies is the result of the merge of two previous political parties: Unidá and Bloque por Asturies.

== History ==
Compromisu was created on June 23, 2012 after the convergence process opened by the Bloque por Asturies and Unidá Nacionalista Asturiana, with the addition of some independents. The party has 5 town councillors, 3 in Nava, 1 in Carreño and in Ḷḷena. Compromisu also supports and participates in Podemos.
