= Bloc for Asturias =

Bloc for Asturias Bloque por Asturies (BA)
- General Secretary: Roberto Colunga
- Spokesperson: Rafael Palacios
- Founded: 2003
- Headquarters: C/Fray Luis de León, 4, 33201, Gijón, Spain
- Ideology: Asturian nationalism Socialism
- Political position: Left-wing

Website
- www.bloque.as

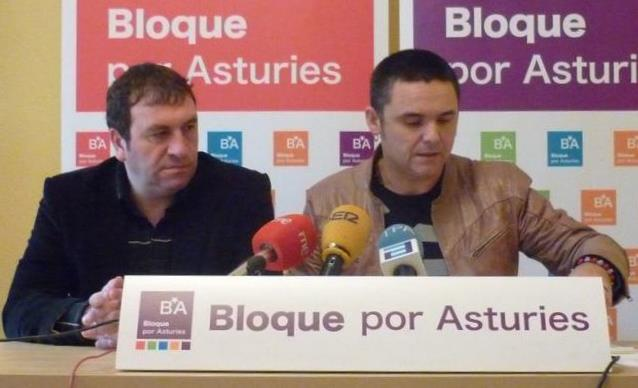
A 2010 press conference of the Bloc for Asturias

Bloc for Asturias (Spanish: Bloque por Asturias, Asturian: Bloque por Asturies, BA) is a left-wing Asturian nationalist political party in Spain, based in the Principality of Asturias. In 2012 it joined with Asturian Nationalist Unity into the Commitment for Asturias (Asturian: Compromisu por Asturies).

It was part of the now-inactive Open Assembly for Officialisation (Asturian: Conceyu Abiertu pola Oficialidá), an organization whose objective was to make Asturian an official language of Spain. Its general secretary is Roberto Colunga and its spokesperson is Rafael Palacios, who held the position of Director of the Asturian Agency for Development Cooperation of the Principality during the 2003-2007 legislature.

== History ==
Bloc for Asturias has its origin in the Nationalist Left of Asturias, which split from Andecha Astur and was a member of the Bloque de la Izquierda Asturiana coalition and various Asturianist independent coalitions. It was founded to attend the 2003 Asturian regional election as part of a coalition with the United Left. It entered the Asturian government when an agreement was signed between the United Left and Spanish Socialist Worker's Party (PSOE).

In the 2004 general elections, it maintained the coalition with the United Left, obtaining said coalition 59,253 votes (8.42%), but did not obtain any seats. In the 2007 regional elections, it again ran in coalition with the United Left, as well as the Asturian Green Party, obtaining 58,114 votes (9.7%), and four seats, of which Bloc for Asturias obtained one. In the 2008 general elections, the coalition obtained 49,936 votes (7.17%), signifying a slight decline in votes from 2004.

Between 2003 and 2007, it formed part of the Asturian government through the agreement between the United Left and PSOE. After the 2007 election, the PSOE initially formed a single-party minority government, but in 2008 it reissued the pact with the United Left, which allowed Bloc for Asturias to re-enter the government.

=== Departure from United Left coalition ===
They formed a mixed group as the only party in the legislature from 2007 to 2011, breaking their alliance with the United Left and the Greens, arguing that the coalition violated the agreement by supporting the proposed austerity measures of the PSOE.

=== Compromisu por Asturies ===
In February 2011, it was announced that the parties Bloc for Asturias and Unidá Nacionalista Asturiana would form a coalition in the 2011 regional elections, presenting Rafael Palacios as their presidential candidate.

The results of these elections showed the best result ever obtained by a left-wing Asturian nationalist electoral coalition, although it fell far short of the coalition's initial expectations. A total of 6,337 votes were obtained (1.05% of the total valid votes) throughout Asturias. In the 2011 municipal elections it obtained 5,460 votes and two councilors, also in coalition with Unidá Nacionalista Asturiana.

In the face of the 2012 regional election, they formed a coalition with the Greens–Green Group. Bloque por Asturies-UNA-LV-GV, also known as Compromisu por Asturies, with Rafael Palacios as candidate for the Presidency of the Principality obtained 1,639 votes (0.32%).

On June 23, 2012, the merger between Bloque por Asturies and Unidá Nacionalista Asturiana came to fruition, with the incorporation of independents, who created the coalition Compromisu por Asturies.
