= Santa Eulalia de Oscos =

Santa Eulalia de Oscos Santalla d'Ozcos (Eonavian)
- Municipality
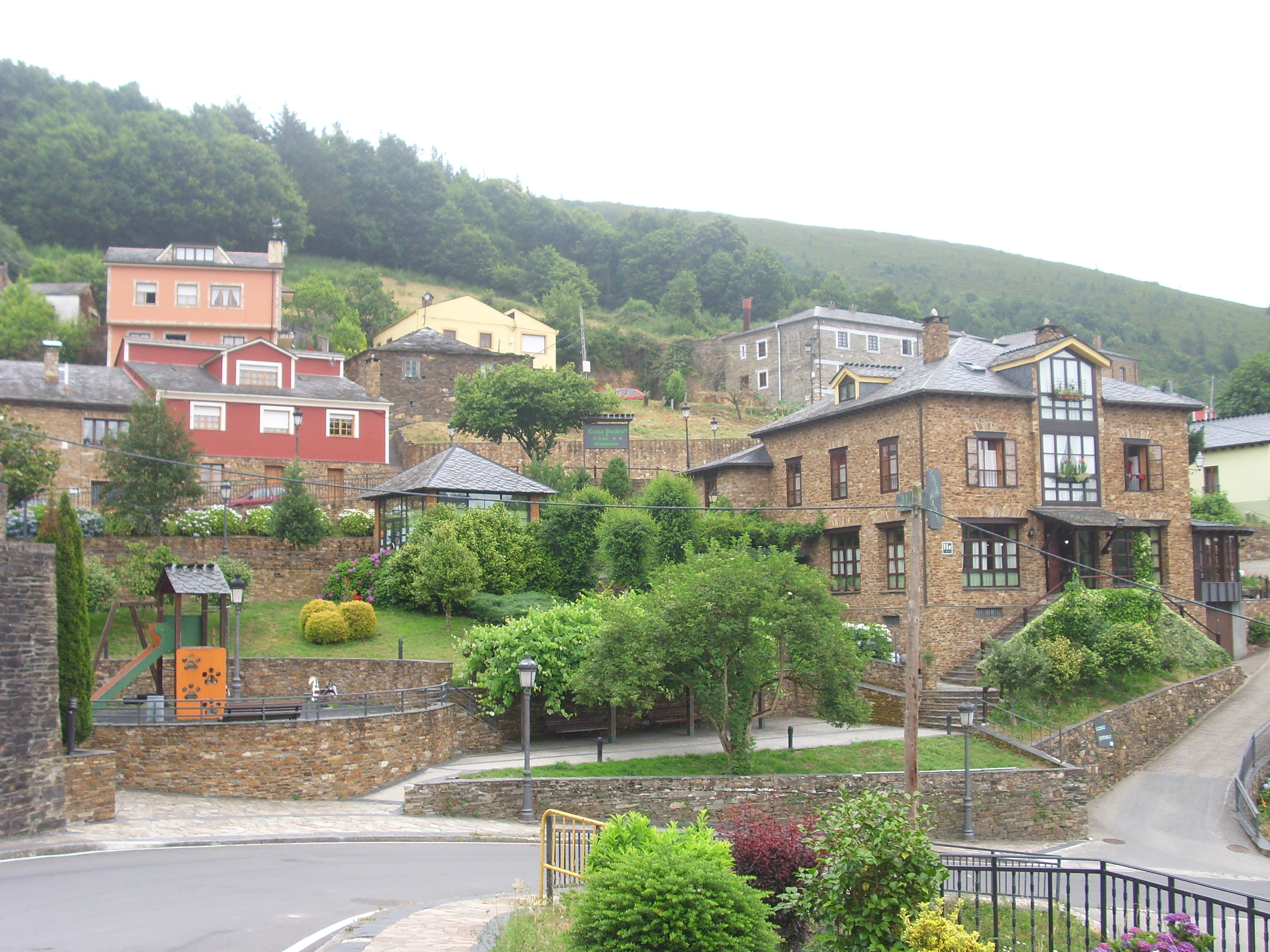

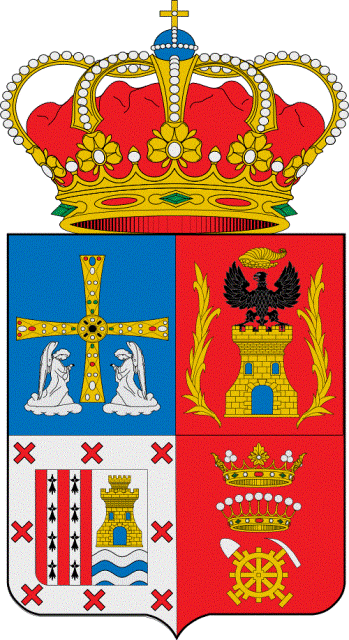
- Flag Coat of arms

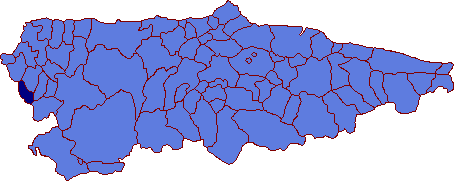

- Location in Spain
- Coordinates: 43°15′N 7°1′W
- Country: Spain
- Autonomous community: Asturias
- Province: Asturias
- Comarca: Eo-Navia
- Judicial district: Castopol
- Capital: Santa Eulalia de Oscos

Government
  - Alcalde: Víctor Lorido Rancaño (PSOE)

Area
  - Total: 47.12 km^{2} (18.19 sq mi)
- Highest elevation: 948 m (3,110 ft)

Population (2025-01-01)
  - Total: 420
  - Density: 8.9/km^{2} (23/sq mi)
- Time zone: UTC+1 (CET)
  - Summer (DST): UTC+2 (CEST)
- Postal code: 33776

Santa Eulalia de Oscos (Eonavian: Santalla d'Ozcos) is a municipality in the Autonomous Community of the Principality of Asturias, Spain. It is bordered on the north by Villanueva de Oscos, on the south and west by Lugo province of Galicia, and on the east by Villanueva de Oscos, San Martín de Oscos and Grandas de Salime.

The municipality consists of only one parish, Santa Eulalia (Santalla).

== See also ==
- List of municipalities in Asturias
