= Unidá =

Unidá Unity
- Secretary-General: Yolanda Huergo
- Spokesperson: Daniel Fernández Blanco; Tino Fernández
- Founded: 2007
- Headquarters: Uviéu
- Ideology: Asturian nationalism Democratic socialism Ecologism
- Union affiliation: Corriente Sindical d'Izquierda

Website
- unida.as

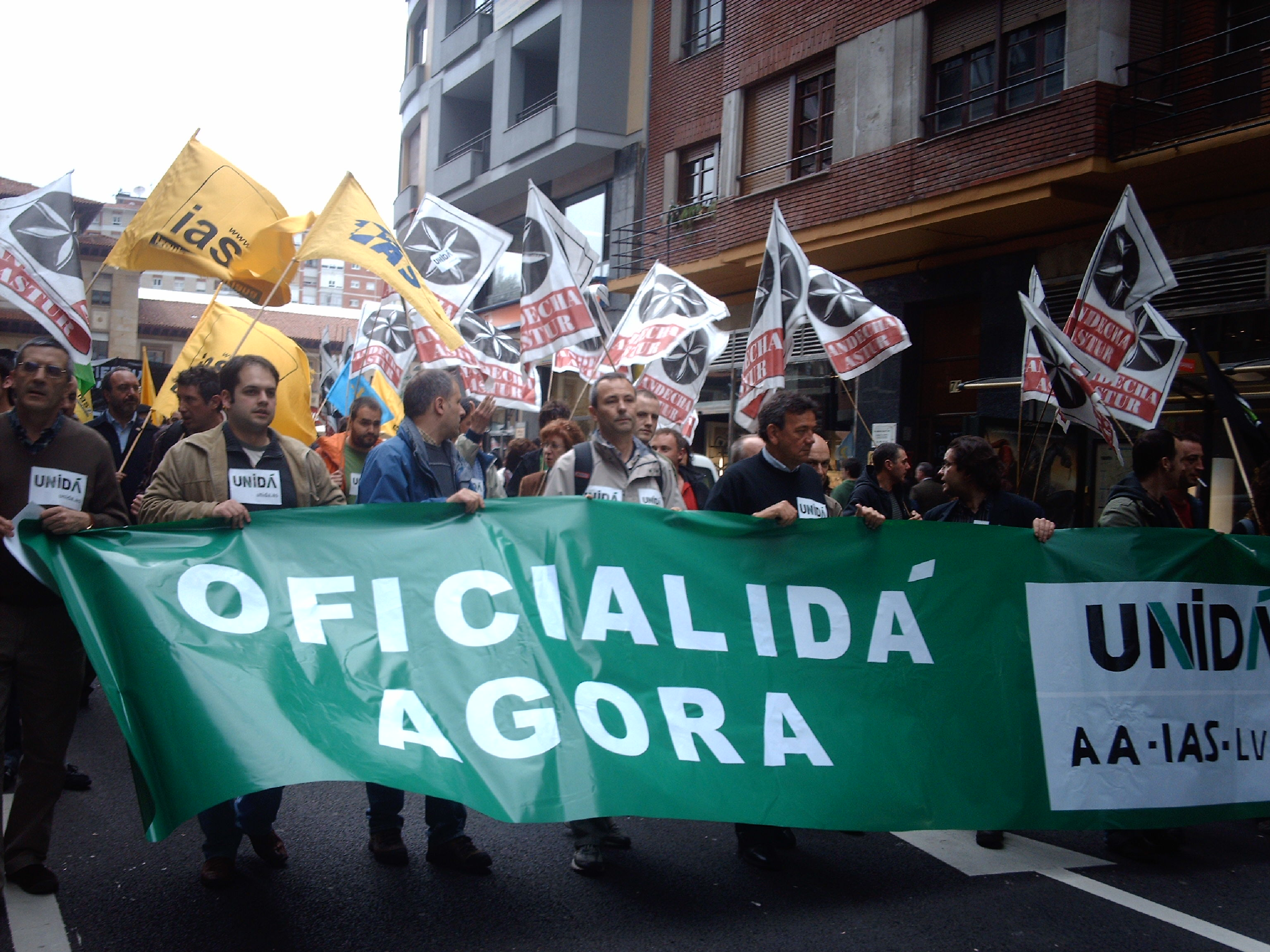
Unidá in the manifestation of the day of the Asturian letters ("Día de les lletres asturianes") of 2007

Unidá is an Asturian federation of parties formed by Asturian Left, members coming from Andecha Astur, and by the local parties Andecha por Carreño, Asturianistes por Nava and Asturianistes por Piloña, forming a local series of groups with the name of Unidá such as Unidá-Avilés or Unidá-Uviéu.

== History ==
Unidá started as an Asturian nationalist alliance of left-wing and ecologist groups. It formed a temporary coalition with another party, The Greens-Green Group, to contest the autonomous and municipal elections of May 2007. In April 2007 the coalition officially presented their candidate to the Asturian Parliament, the recognized writer and psychiatrist Ignaciu Llope.

Their manifesto supported the defense of the Asturian language, culture and identity. It incorporated measures to tackle problems they claimed Asturias faced: the economic and labour crisis, ecological corruption at certain levels, and attacks that they thought the then-government caused. In general, it proposed the implementation of a new model of territorial development, from a new Statute of Autonomy that supposes an important extension in comparison with the present one, in addition to one bets by an option that of continuity to a unit which they think that the Asturian nationalism of left needed years ago.

Their results in elections of 2007 were modest, although it was highest in the history of the left nationalism in Asturias, with 4,119 votes (0.7%). While, in the municipal elections, the coalition, thanks to its local groupings, obtained four councillors: two in Nava (Asturianistes por Nava), one in Carreño (Andecha por Carreño) and another one in Piloña (IAS-Asturianistes), where a pact of government granted in addition to the formation three councils and the possession to mayorship. These also are the best results ever obtained by a political option of this type.
