= List of municipalities in Asturias by area =

The following is a list of municipalities in Asturias by area:

Name	Area km^{2}	% of Asturias
Allande	342,24	3.23%
Aller	375,89	3.54%
Amieva	113,90	1.07%
Avilés	26,81	0.25%
Belmonte de Miranda	208,01	1.96%
Bimenes	32,69	0.31%
Boal	120,28	1.13%
Cabrales	238,20	2.25%
Cabranes	38,31	0.36%
Candamo	71,97	0.68%
Cangas de Narcea	823,57	7.77%
Cangas de Onís	212,75	2.01%
Caravia	13,36	0.13%
Carreño	66,70	0.63%
Caso	307,94	2.90%
Castrillón	55,34	0.52%
Castropol	125,77	1.19%
Coaña	65,80	0.62%
Colunga	97,57	0.92%
Corvera de Asturias	46,01	0.43%
Cudillero	100,78	0.95%
Degaña	87,16	0.82%
Franco, El	78,04	0.74%
Gijón	181,60	1.71%
Gozón	81,73	0.77%
Grado	221,64	2.09%
Grandas de Salime	112,55	1.06%
Ibias	333,30	3.14%
Illano	102,70	0.97%
Illas	25,51	0.24%
Langreo	82,46	0.78%
Regueras, Las	65,85	0.62%
Laviana	130,99	1.24%
Lena	315,51	2.98%
Llanera	106,69	1.01%
Llanes	263,59	2.49%
Mieres	146,03	1.38%
Morcín	50,05	0.47%
Muros del Nalón	8.09	0.08%
Nava	95,81	0.90%
Navia	63,12	0.60%
Noreña	5.29	0.05%
Onís	75,42	0.71%
Oviedo	186,65	1.76%
Parres	126,08	1.19%
Peñamellera Alta	92,19	0.87%
Peñamellera Baja	83,85	0.79%
Pesoz	38,97	0.37%
Piloña	283,89	2.68%
Ponga	205,98	1.94%
Pravia	102,96	0.97%
Proaza	76,79	0.72%
Quirós	208,79	1.97%
Ribadedeva	35,66	0.34%
Ribadesella	84,37	0.80%
Ribera de Arriba	21,98	0.21%
Riosa	46,49	0.44%
Salas	227,11	2.14%
San Martín de Oscos	66,56	0.63%
San Martín del Rey Aurelio	56,13	0.53%
San Tirso de Abres	31,41	0.30%
Santa Eulalia de Oscos	47,12	0.44%
Santo Adriano	22,60	0.21%
Sariego	25,72	0.24%
Siero	211,60	2.00%
Sobrescobio	69,42	0.65%
Somiedo	291,38	2.75%
Soto del Barco	35,34	0.33%
Tapia de Casariego	65,99	0.62%
Taramundi	82,16	0.77%
Teverga	168,86	1.59%
Tineo	540,83	5.10%
Valdés	353,52	3.33%
Vegadeo	82,76	0.78%
Villanueva de Oscos	72,98	0.69%
Villaviciosa	276,23	2.61%
Villayón	132,46	1.25%
Yernes y Tameza	31,63	0.30%
