= Comarcas of Asturias =

Comarcas of Asturias.

Asturias, an autonomous community in Spain, is divided into eight comarcas (cotarros in Asturian). These comarcas are not an administrative division of the autonomous community, and are only used as a system to homogenize the statistical data collected by the Principality of Asturias.

The comarcas in Spain are a grouping of municipalities that are encouraged (but not required) to work together to achieve objectives. The term Comarca is a Spanish word roughly equivalent to the English word county.

== List ==
The comarcas of Asturias are listed here, each with its Spanish-language name first, followed by its Asturian-language name if that differs:

Name	Location on Map	Municipalities (municipios in Spanish/conceyos in Asturian)	Population	Area
Avilés		10: Avilés, Candamo, Castrillón, Corvera de Asturias, Cudillero, Gozón, Illas, Muros de Nalón, Pravia, Soto del Barco	156,038	535km^{2}
Caudal		3: Lena, Aller, Mieres	75,575	823km^{2}
Eo-Navia		17: Valdés, Navia, Villayón, Cuaña, Boal, Eilao, Pezós, Grandas de Salime, El Franco, Tapia, Samartín d'Ozcos, Santalla d'Ozcos, Vilanova d'Ozcos, Castropol, Veiga d'Eo, Santiso d'Abres, Taramundi	67,307	1,645km^{2}
Gijón / Xixón		3: Villaviciosa, Gijón / Xixón, Carreño	301,171	518km^{2}
Nalón		5: Caso (Casu), Sobrescobio (Sobrescobiu), Laviana (Llaviana), San Martín del Rey Aurelio (Samartín del Rei Aureliu), Langreo (Llangréu)	84,790	647km^{2}
Narcea		5: Ibias, Degaña, Cangas del Narcea, Allande, Tineo	34,534	2,043km^{2}
Oriente		14: Ribadedeva, Peñamellera Baxa, Peñamellera Alta, Cabrales, Llanes, Onís, Cangues d'Onís, Ribesella, Amieva, Parres, Caravia, Colunga, Piloña, Ponga	48,280	1,829 km^{2} (706 sq mi)
Oviedo / Uviéu		21: Cabranes, Nava, Sariegu, Bimenes, Siero, Noreña, Oviedo, Llanera, Les Regueres, Ribera de Arriba, Morcín, Riosa, Santu Adrianu, Grau, Quirós, Teberga, Proaza, Yernes y Tameza, Somiedu, Salas, Miranda	263,298	2,323km^{2}

== See also ==
- Comarcas of Spain
- List of municipalities in Asturias
