= List of municipalities in Asturias =

Map of Spain with Asturias highlighted

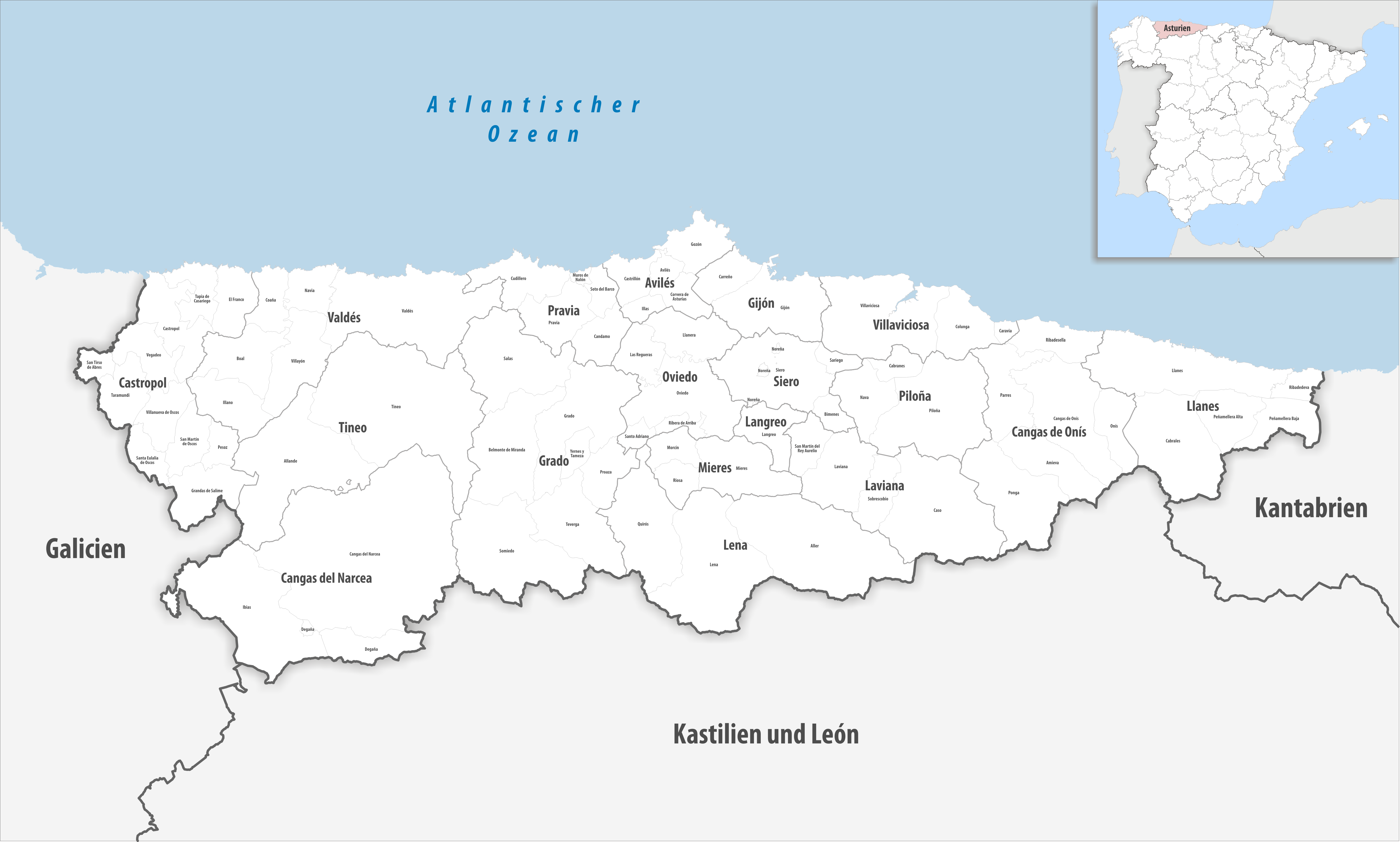
Map of the municipalities in the province of Asturias

Asturias is a province that is coextensive with the autonomous community of Asturias, Spain. The province is divided into 78 municipalities. As of the 2025 Spanish census, Asturias is the 14th most populous of Spain's 50 provinces, with 1,015,128 inhabitants, and the 21st largest by land area, spanning 10,605.70 square kilometres (4,094.88 sq mi). Municipalities are the most basic local political division in Spain and can only belong to one province. They enjoy a large degree of autonomy in their local administration, being in charge of tasks such as urban planning, water supply, lighting, roads, local police, and firefighting. Municipalities also belong to a comarca, a second level administrative unit.

== List ==
Largest municipalities in the Asturias by population

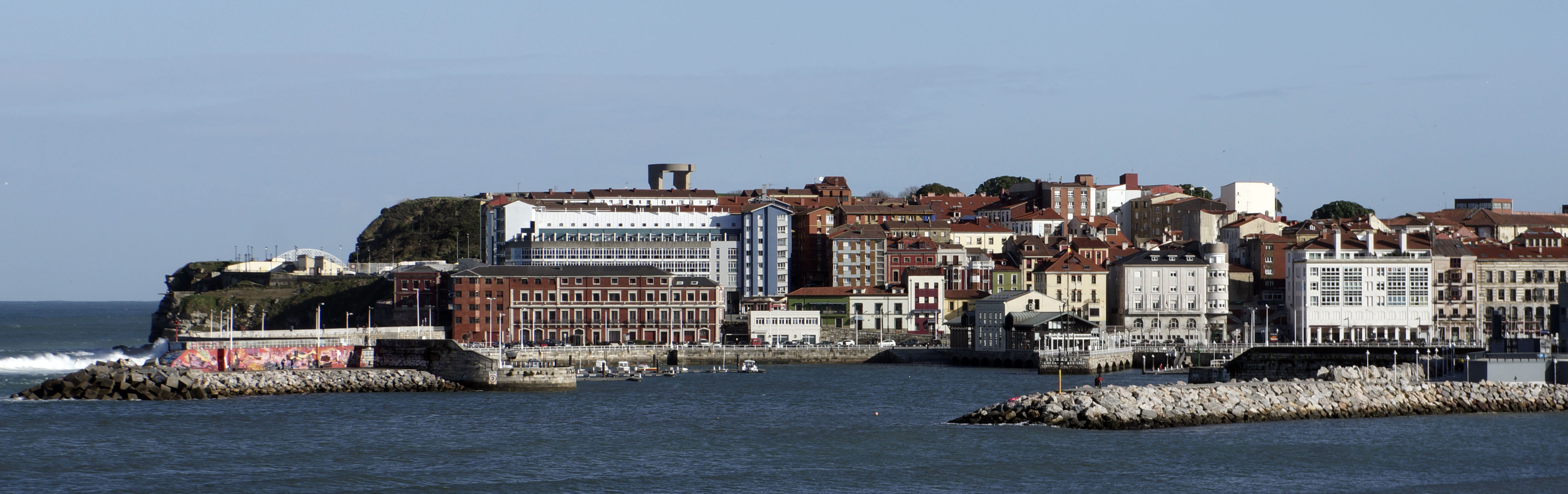
Gijón is the province's largest municipality by population.

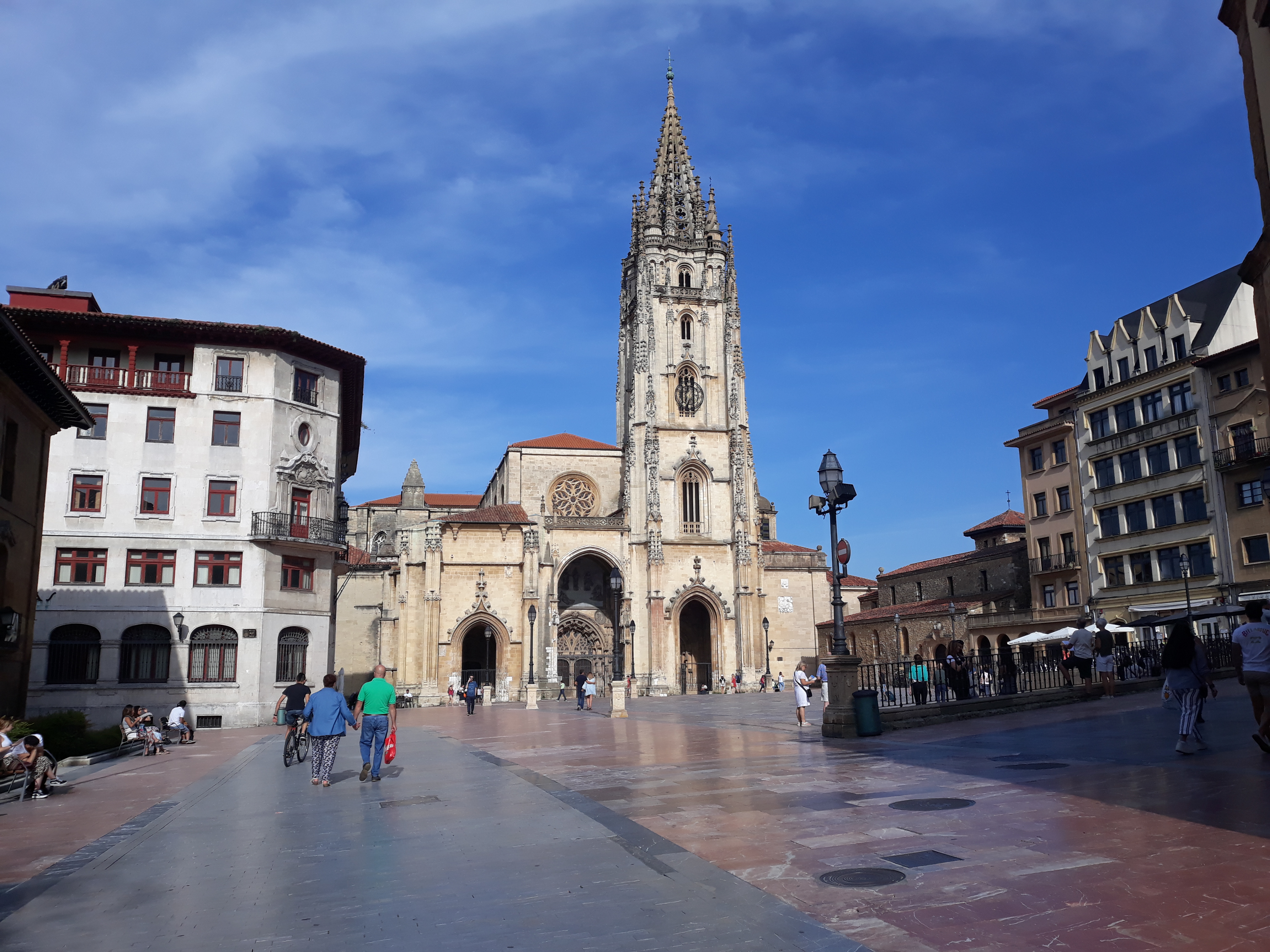
Oviedo is the capital of Asturias and the second largest municipality by population

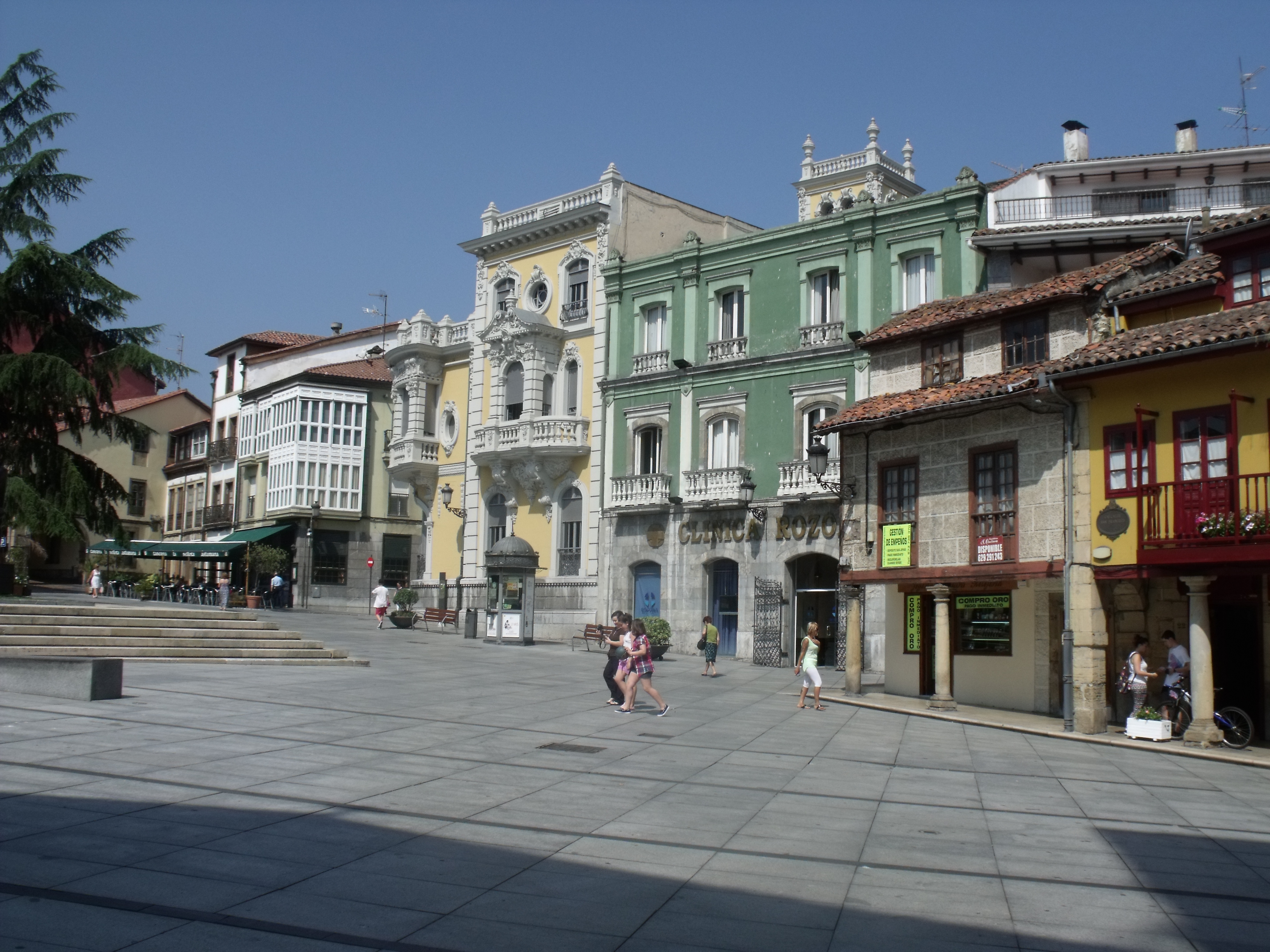
The third largest municipality by population in Asturias is Avilés

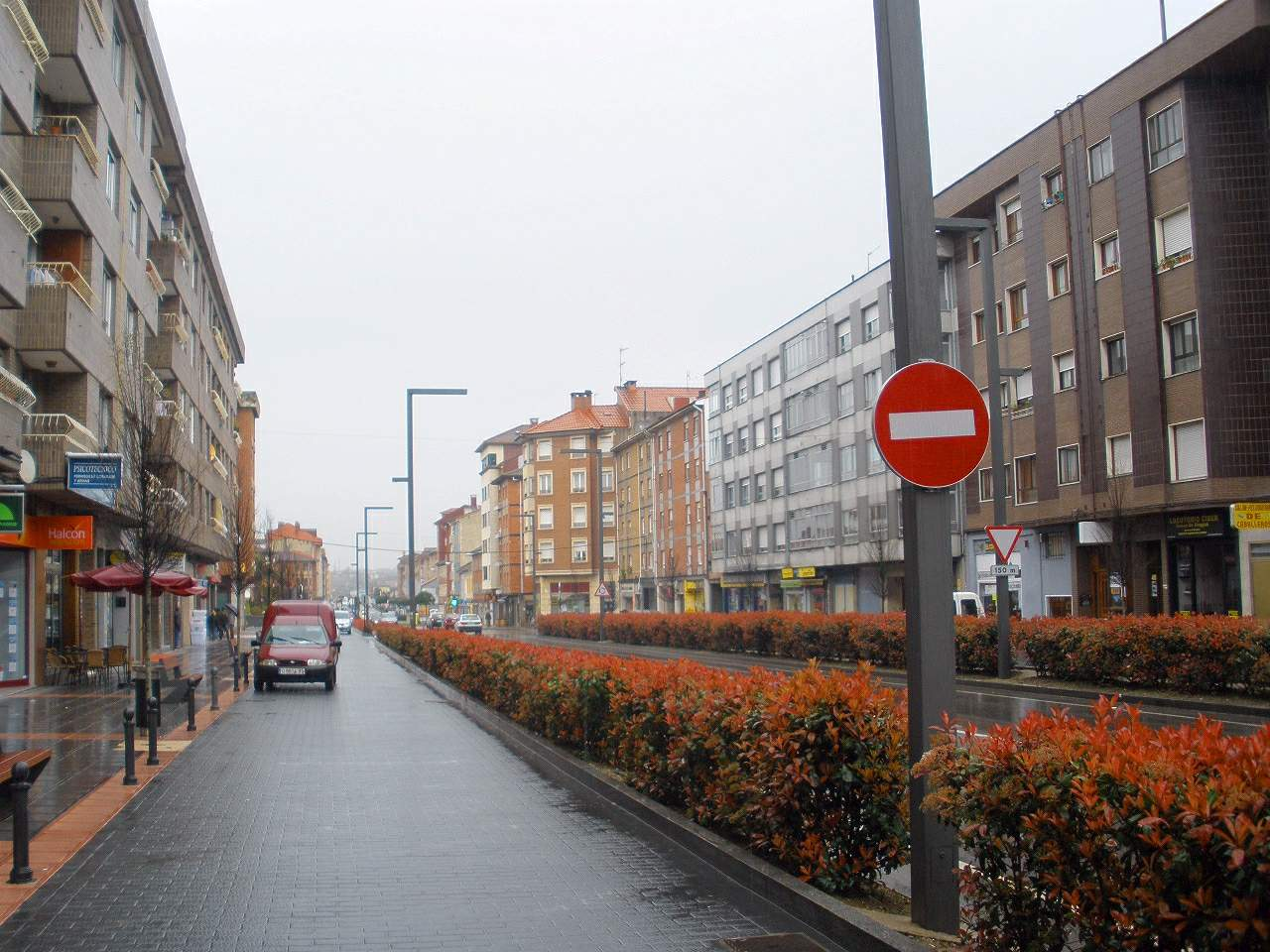
Siero is the fourth largest municipality in Asturias by population

Flag	Name (Spanish) Name (Asturian)	Area (km^{2})	Population (2001 census)	Population (2011 census)	Population (2021 census)	Population (2025)	Comarca
	Allande; Allande	342.2	2,395	1,946	1,622	1,506	Narcea
	Aller; Ayer	375.9	14,639	12,111	10,358	10,011	Caudal
	Amieva; Amieva	113.9	867	801	622	591	Oriente
	Avilés; Avilés	26.8	83,185	82,938	76,951	75,517	Avilés
	Belmonte de Miranda; Miranda	208.0	2,159	1,723	1,437	1,366	Oviedo
	Bimenes; Bimenes	32.7	2,038	1,872	1,694	1,639	Oviedo
	Boal; Bual	120.3	2,395	1,811	1,452	1,372	Eo-Navia
	Cabrales; Cabrales	238.3	2,323	2,161	1,957	1,884	Oriente
	Cabranes; Cabranes	38.3	1,155	1,074	1,112	1,094	Oviedo
	Candamo; Candamu	72.0	2,523	2,131	1,963	1,902	Avilés
	Cangas de Onís; Cangues d'Onís	212.7	6,068	6,696	6,213	6,344	Oriente
	Cangas del Narcea; Cangas del Narcea	823.8	16,511	14,088	11,966	11,282	Narcea
	Caravia; Caravia	13.4	577	522	508	486	Oriente
	Carreño; Carreño	66.7	10,564	10,932	10,283	10,292	Gijón
	Caso; Casu	308.0	1,962	1,791	1,451	1,437	Nalón
	Castrillón; Castrillón	55.3	22,501	22,938	22,297	21,998	Avilés
	Castropol; Castropol	125.8	4,222	3,713	3,334	3,202	Eo-Navia
	Coaña; Cuaña	65.9	3,651	3,455	3,312	3,321	Eo-Navia
	Colunga; Colunga	97.6	4,282	3,629	3,239	3,143	Oriente
	Corvera de Asturias; Corvera	46.0	15,885	16,199	15,568	15,785	Avilés
	Cudillero; Cuideiru	100.8	6,094	5,649	4,993	4,867	Avilés
	Degaña; Degaña	87.2	1,385	1,175	852	768	Narcea
	El Franco; El Franco	78.0	4,123	3,921	3,776	3,728	Eo-Navia
	Gijón; Xixón	181.6	266,419	276,969	269,311	269,894	Gijón
	Gozón; Gozón	81.7	11,074	10,732	10,399	10,407	Avilés
	Grado; Grau	216.7	11,454	10,765	9,656	9,681	Oviedo
	Grandas de Salime; Grandas de Salime	112.5	1,271	994	789	767	Eo-Navia
	Ibias; Ibias	333.3	2,082	1,635	1,184	1,084	Narcea
	Illano; Eilao	102.7	618	444	320	277	Eo-Navia
	Illas; Illas	25.5	1,108	1,037	1,045	1,048	Avilés
	Langreo; Llangréu	82.5	45,731	43,934	38,693	38,612	Nalón
	Laviana; Llaviana	131.0	14,531	14,026	12,761	12,352	Nalón
	Lena; Ḷḷena	315.5	13,573	12,346	10,624	10,382	Caudal
	Llanera; Llanera	106.7	12,302	14,066	13,827	14,020	Oviedo
	Llanes; Llanes	263.6	13,276	13,962	13,686	13,486	Oriente
	Mieres; Mieres	146.0	47,719	42,425	37,016	36,373	Caudal
	Morcín; Morcín	50.0	3,068	2,850	2,534	2,460	Oviedo
	Muros de Nalón; Muros	8.1	2,178	1,925	1,924	1,955	Avilés
	Nava; Nava	95.8	5,406	5,570	5,272	5,244	Oviedo
	Navia; Navia	63.1	9,063	8,936	8,305	8,031	Eo-Navia
	Noreña; Noreña	5.7	4,490	5,432	5,114	5,131	Oviedo
	Onís; Onís	75.4	847	781	732	739	Oriente
	Oviedo; Uviéu	186.6	201,154	225,005	217,164	223,968	Oviedo
	Parres; Parres	126.1	5,543	5,727	5,292	5,150	Oriente
	Peñamellera Alta; El Valle Altu de Peñamellera	92.2	708	587	507	500	Oriente
	Peñamellera Baja; El Valle Baju de Peñamellera	83.8	1,560	1,322	1,243	1,194	Oriente
	Pesoz; Pezós	39.0	241	191	141	134	Eo-Navia
	Piloña; Piloña	283.9	8,608	7,794	6,910	6,716	Oriente
	Ponga; Ponga	206.0	701	688	574	576	Oriente
	Pravia; Pravia	103.0	9,226	8,972	7,927	7,792	Avilés
	Proaza; Proaza	76.8	853	813	724	686	Oviedo
	Quirós; Quirós	208.8	1,488	1,290	1,208	1,142	Oviedo
	Las Regueras; Les Regueres	65.8	2,145	1,953	1,878	1,892	Oviedo
	Ribadedeva; Ribedeva	35.7	1,806	1,879	1,726	1,693	Oriente
	Ribadesella; Ribeseya	84.4	6,252	6,204	5,700	5,591	Oriente
	Ribera de Arriba; La Ribera	22.0	1,979	1,978	1,849	1,852	Oviedo
	Riosa; Riosa	46.5	2,510	2,145	1,839	1,686	Oviedo
	Salas; Salas	227.1	6,705	5,657	4,873	4,771	Oviedo
	San Martín de Oscos; Samartín d'Ozcos	66.6	494	482	352	337	Eo-Navia
	San Martín del Rey Aurelio; Samartín del Rei Aurelio	56.1	20,247	17,993	15,664	15,531	Nalón
	San Tirso de Abres; San Tiso d'Abres	31.4	624	522	418	396	Eo-Navia
	Santa Eulalia de Oscos; Santalla d'Ozcos	47.1	557	505	435	420	Eo-Navia
	Santo Adriano; Santo Adriano	22.6	319	259	276	281	Oviedo
	Sariego; Sariegu	25.7	1,372	1,307	1,301	1,252	Oviedo
	Siero; Siero	211.2	47,890	52,142	51,574	53,049	Oviedo
	Sobrescobio; Sobrescobiu	69.4	831	878	830	838	Nalón
	Somiedo; Somiedo	291.4	1,565	1,356	1,119	1,031	Oviedo
	Soto del Barco; Sotu'l Barcu	35.3	4,174	4,041	3,861	3,801	Avilés
	Tapia de Casariego; Tapia	66.0	4,315	3,993	3,678	3,538	Eo-Navia
	Taramundi; Taramundi	82.2	875	741	592	545	Eo-Navia
	Teverga; Teberga	173.8	2,111	1,894	1,594	1,495	Oviedo
	Tineo; Tinéu	540.7	12,598	10,647	9,108	8,679	Narcea
	Valdés; Valdés	353.5	14,789	13,064	11,272	10,776	Eo-Navia
	Vegadeo; A Veiga	82.8	4,561	4,147	3,915	3,928	Eo-Navia
	Villanueva de Oscos; Vilanova d'Ozcos	73.0	419	345	275	244	Eo-Navia
	Villaviciosa; Villaviciosa	276.2	13,951	14,921	14,868	15,379	Gijón
	Villayón; Villayón	132.5	1,895	1,466	1,150	1,054	Eo-Navia
	Yernes y Tameza; Tameza	31.6	218	166	128	134	Oviedo
Totals			1,062,998	1,075,179	1,012,117	1,013,529	

== See also ==
- Geography of Spain
- List of Spanish cities
