= Nalón =

Nalón can refer to:

- Nalón (Asturian comarca), in northern Spain
- Nalón (river), a river in the comarca
- Muros de Nalón, a municipality in the comarca
