= Caldoveiro Peak =

Mountain in Asturias, Northern Spain

Coordinates: 43°14′07″N 6°06′57″W

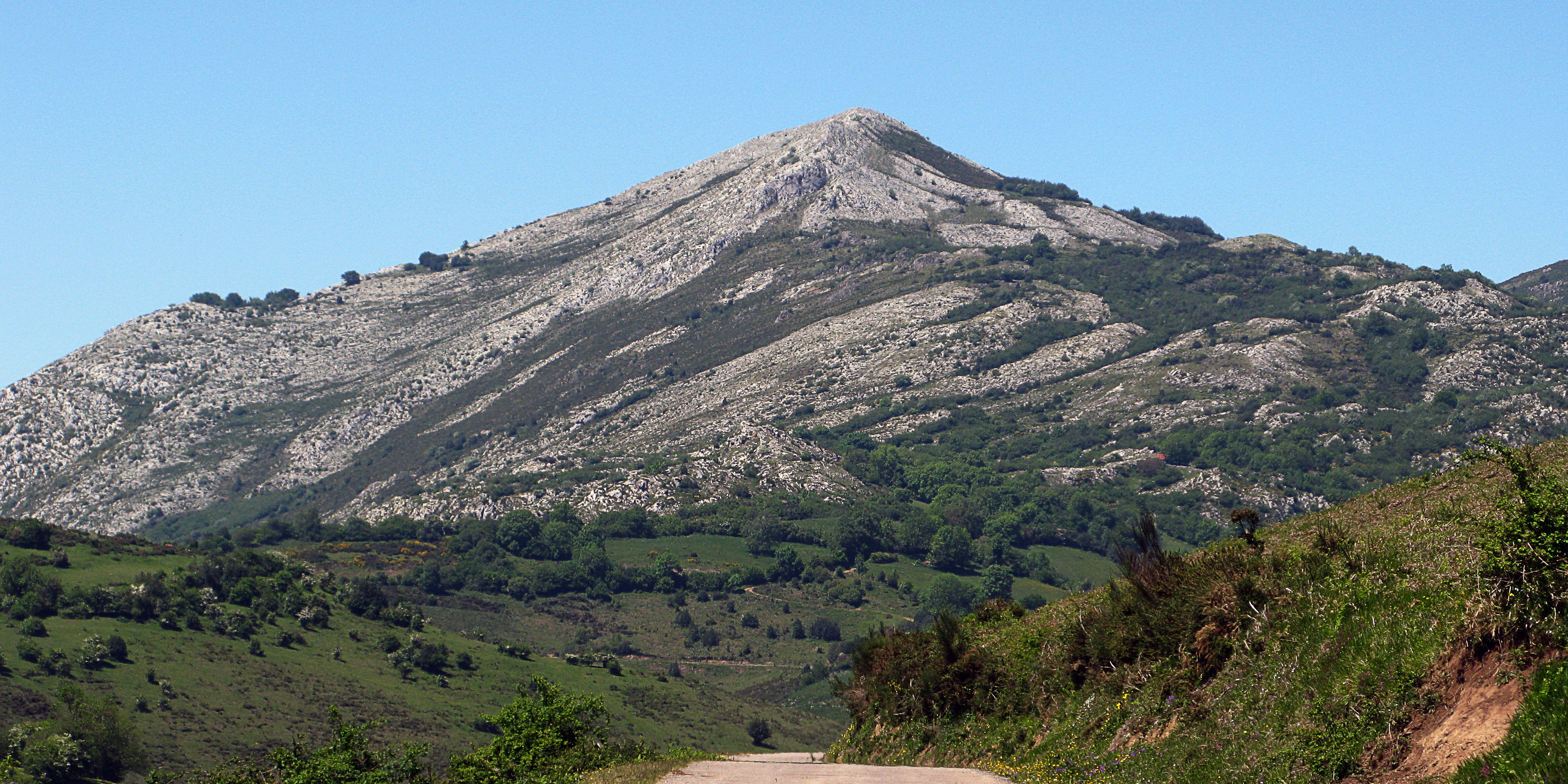
Caldoveiro Peak.

Caldoveiro Peak (Picu Caldoveiro) is a protected mountain range in Asturias, Northern Spain, with a maximum peak of 1,357 meters, near the village of Villabre. It spans the parishes of Yernes, Proaza, Tameza, Grau (Grado), and Teberga (Teverga). Minerals found in Caldoveiro mines include Fluorite, Calcite, and Quartz. The Asturian administration uses Caldoveiro Peak in its tourism advertising, describing the mountain range as so:

The varied vegetation of this nature area and the different processes of erosion that sculpt contrasting terrain form a picturesque landscape dotted with small mountain lakes and high pastures with stone huts known as corros.

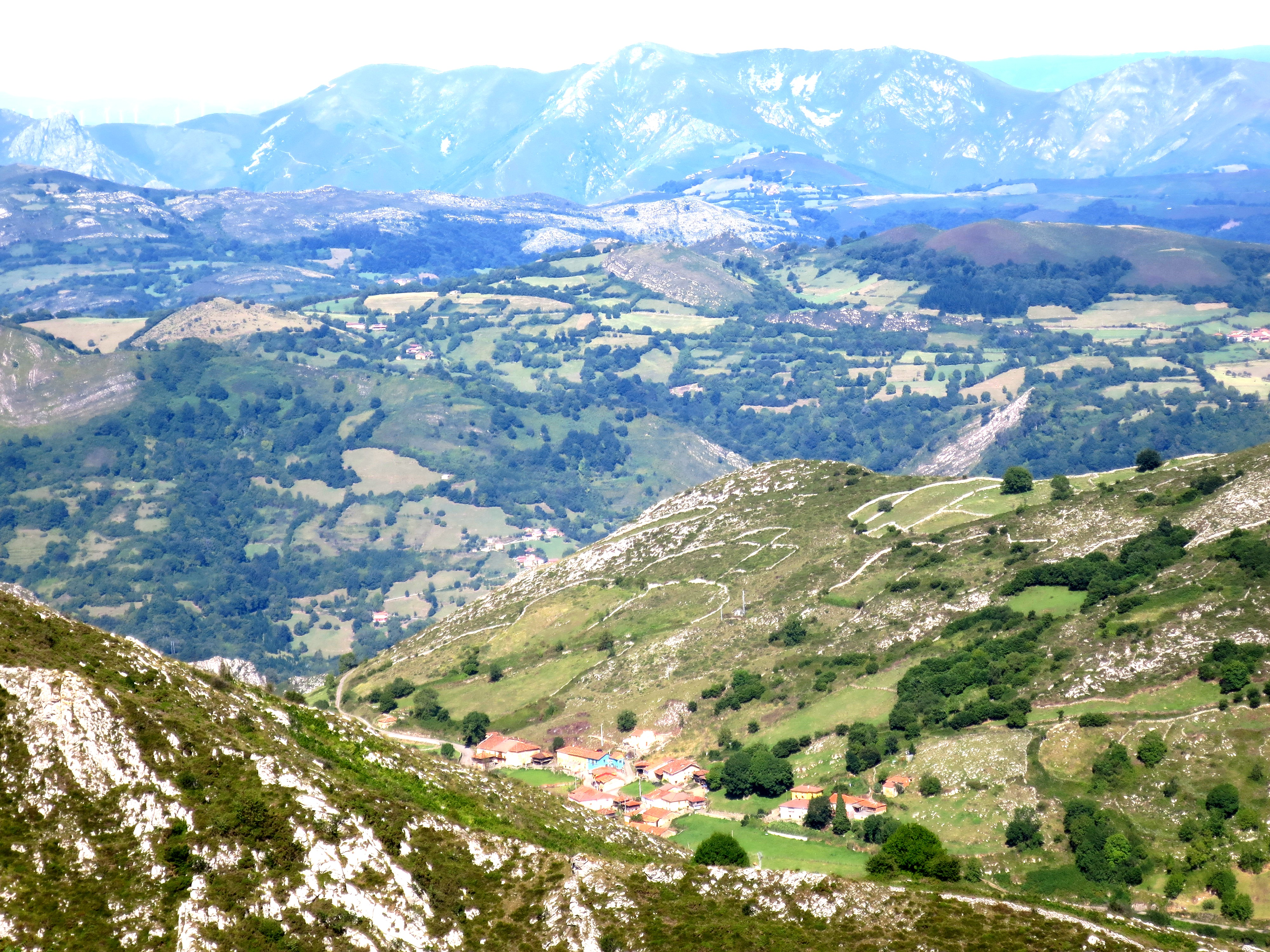
Caldoveiro at Yernes and Tameza.

== Travel ==
One Spanish source indicates that Caldoveiro Peak is "a nice walk in the surroundings of the Ports of Maravio..."
