= Avilés (comarca) =

Coordinates: 43°31′48″N 6°00′33″W

- Comarca
- Country: Spain
- Autonomous community: Asturias
- Province: Asturias
- Capital: Avilés
- Municipalities: List: Avilés, Candamo, Castrillón, Corvera de Asturias, Cudillero, Gozón, Illas, Muros de Nalón, Pravia, Soto del Barco

Area
  - Total: 535 km^{2} (207 sq mi)

Population
  - Total: 156,038
  - Density: 292/km^{2} (755/sq mi)
- Time zone: UTC+1 (CET)
  - Summer (DST): UTC+2 (CEST)

Avilés is one of 8 comarcas, administrative divisions of Asturias, which is a province and an autonomous community in Spain.

The comarca of Avilés is divided into ten municipalities:

- Avilés
- Candamo
- Castrillón
- Corvera de Asturias
- Cudillero
- Gozón
- Illas
- Muros de Nalón
- Pravia
- Soto del Barco
