= Suares =

- Parish
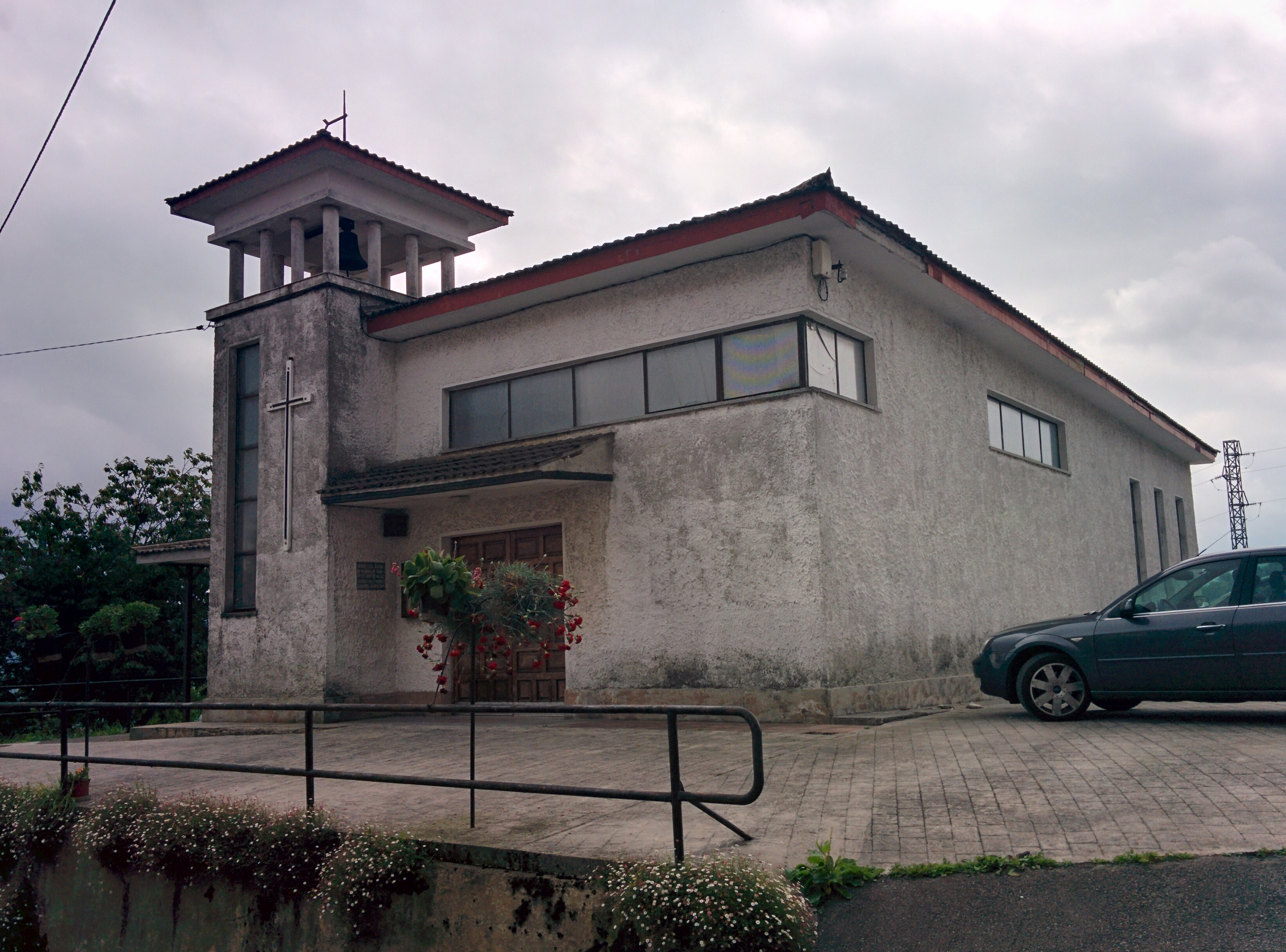
- Santa María Church in Suares

- Location within Spain
- Coordinates: 43°20′19″N 5°35′7″W
- Country: Spain
- Autonomous community: Asturias
- Province: Asturias
- Municipality: Bimenes

Population (2011)
  - Total: 269

Suares is one of three parishes (administrative divisions) in Bimenes, a municipality within the province and autonomous community of Asturias, in northern Spain.

It is 5.34 km^{2} (2.06 sq mi) in size with a population of 269.

== Villages ==
- Argamoso (L'Argamusu)
- Baragaña (La Bargaña)
- Canales (Los Canales)
- Casa del Monte (La Casa'l Monte)
- Casa del Río (La Casa'l Río)
- Castañera
- Cueto de Suares (Los Cuitos)
- Estación (La Estación)
- Fadiello (El Faidiillu)
- La Cantera
- La Cruz
- Las Cabañas (Les Cabañes)
- Las Cruces (Les Cruces)
- Llantada (La Llantá)
- Riega la Tobe
- Suares
- Texuca (La Texuca)
