= Villanueva (Ribadedeva) =

Coordinates: 43.361198°N 4.550926°W

Villanueva is one of three parishes (administrative divisions) in Ribadedeva, a municipality within the province and autonomous community of Asturias, in northern Spain.

The population is 184 (INE 2011).

== Villages ==
- Andinas
- Vilde
- Villanueva
