= Teyego =

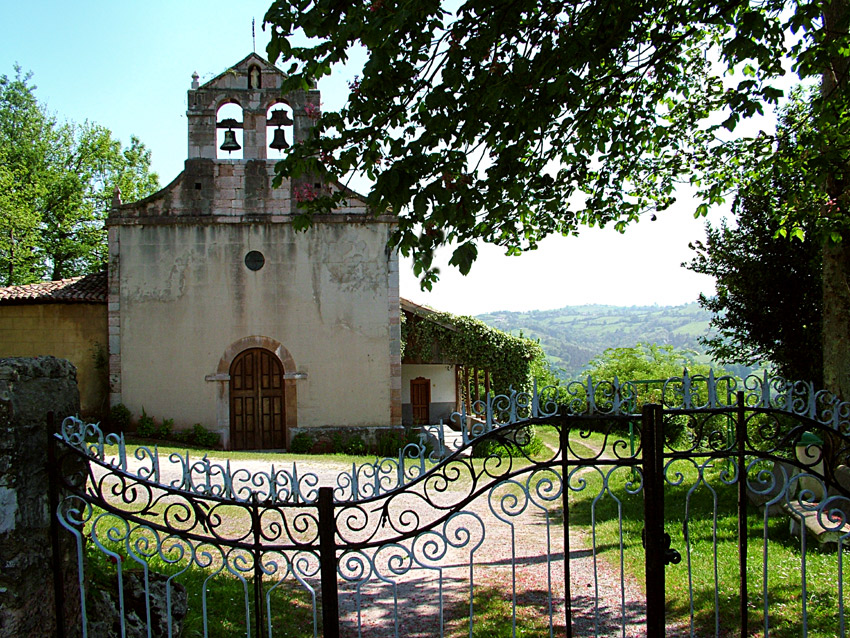
church in Teyego.

Teyego is one of the five parishes in the municipality of Ribera de Arriba, in the principality of Asturias in northern Spain.

Teyego is located two kilometers from Soto Ribera. It has an area of 5.78 square kilometers, and a population of 210 inhabitants. Its notable buildings include the 17th-Century Church of St. Nicholas of Bari.

== Neighborhoods ==
- Entepuentes
- La Mortera
- Les Mianes
- Sardín
- Teyego
- Vegalencia

=== Other populated places ===
- El Bravial
- El Llugar de Baxo
- El Llugar de Riba
- El Picón
- La Corrá
- La Cortina
- La Cruz del Valle
- La Fontanina
- La Pruvía
- Les Cases de Baxo
- Les Fraes
- Les Lliñaes
- Valmecía
