= Caravia L'Alta =

- Parish
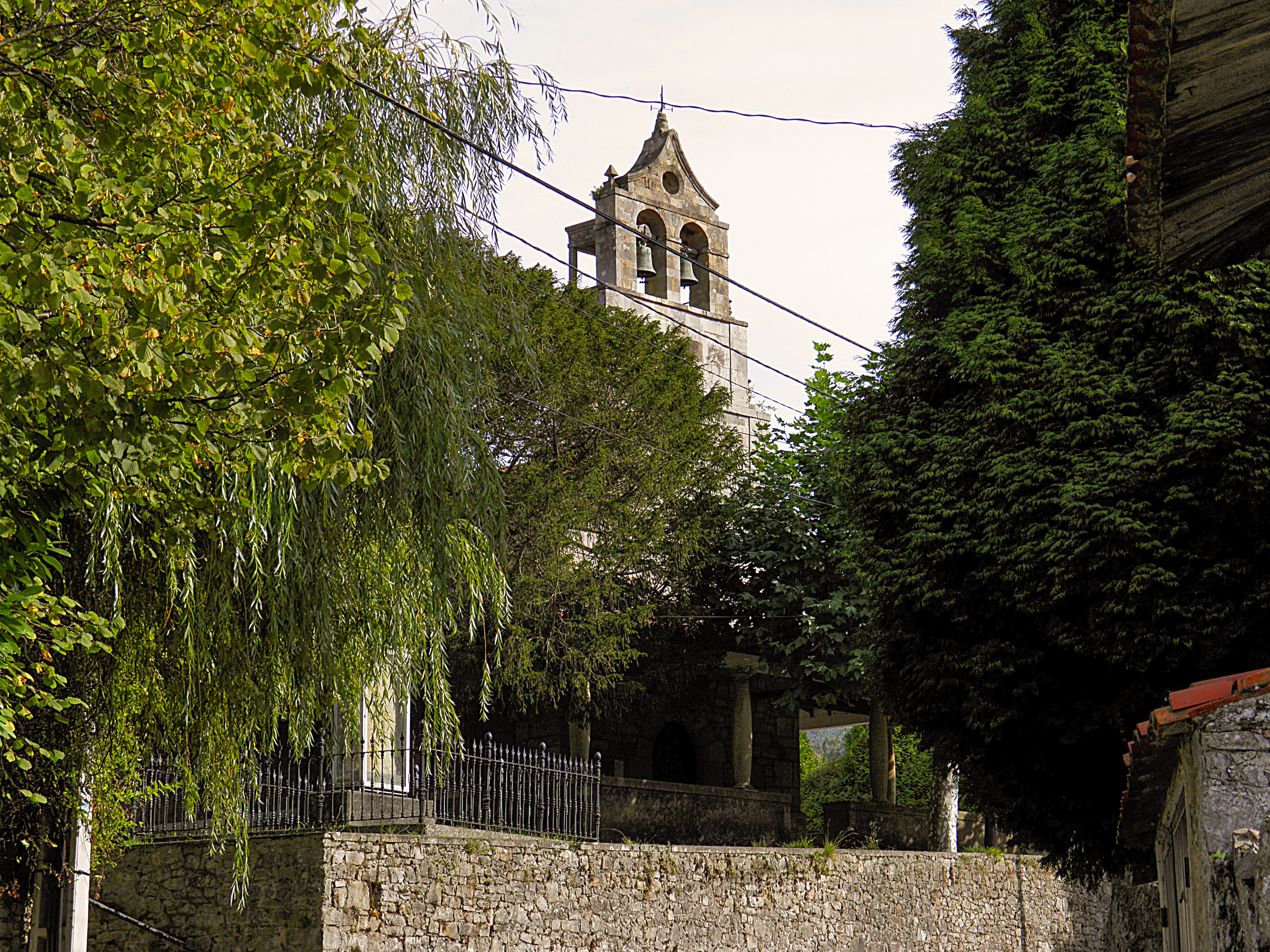
- Interactive map of Caravia L'Alta
- Country: Spain
- Autonomous community: Asturias
- Province: Asturias
- Municipality: Caravia

Caravia L'Alta is one of two parishes in Caravia, a municipality within the province and autonomous community of Asturias, in northern Spain.

The parroquia, or parish, is 8.05 km^{2} (3.11 sq mi) in size, with a population of 324 (INE 2007).

== Village and hamlets ==
- Prado (Prau) (municipal capital)
- La Cantiella
- Cerracín
- Pumarín (43.4667°N 5.1833°W)
- La Rotella
- Bandalisque (Vandalisque)
