= Caravia La Baxa =

Coordinates: 43.45°N 5.2°W

- Parish
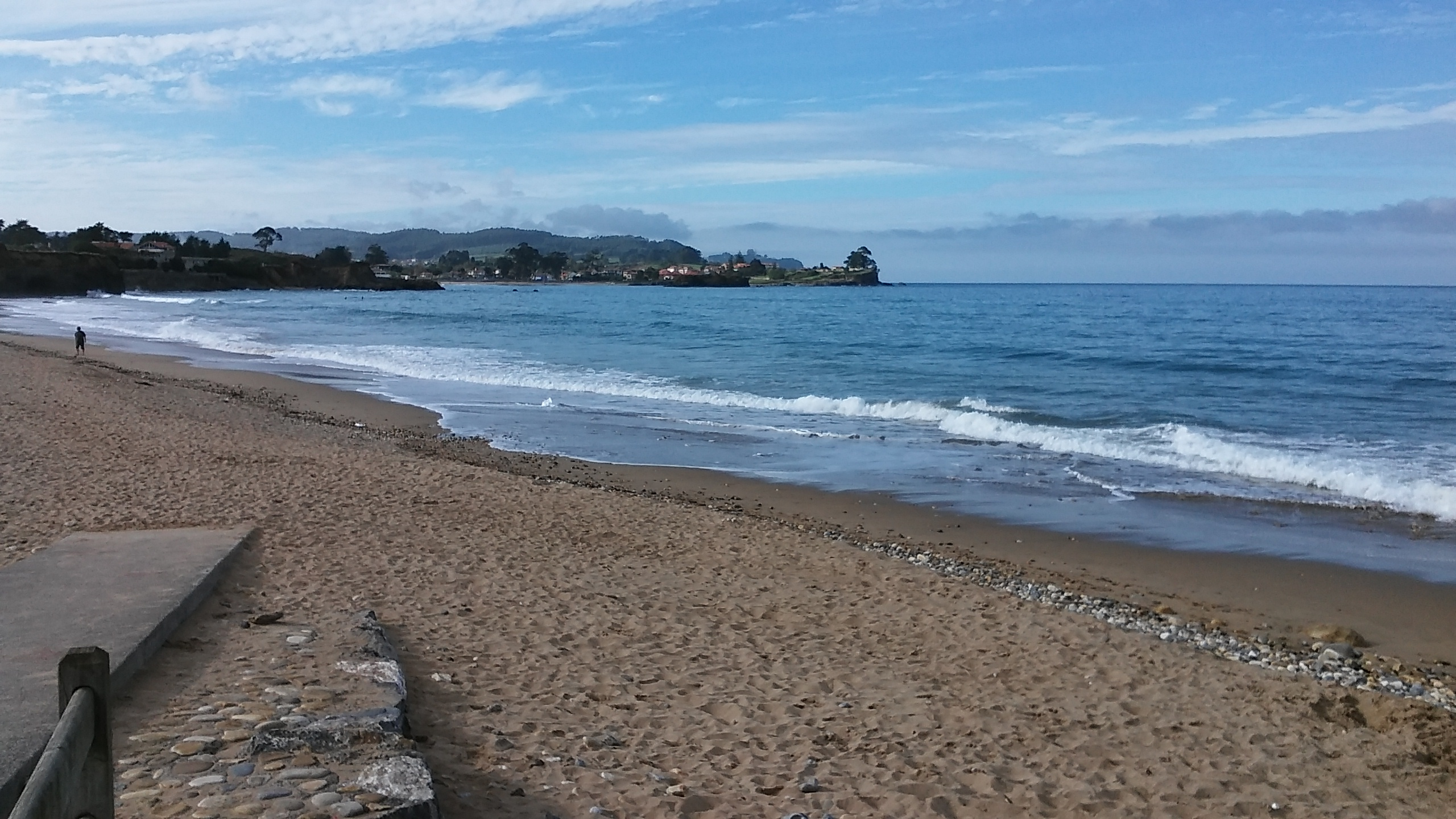
- Interactive map of Caravia La Baxa
- Country: Spain
- Autonomous community: Asturias
- Province: Asturias
- Municipality: Caravia

Caravia La Baxa is one of two parishes in Caravia, a municipality within the province and autonomous community of Asturias, in northern Spain.

The parroquia is 5.31 km^{2} (2.05 sq mi) in size, with a population of 254 (INE 2007).

== Village and hamlets ==
- Carrales
- Duesos
- Duyos
- El Valle
- El Visu
- La Espasa
