= Illas (parish) =

- Parish
- Location within Spain
- Country: Spain
- Autonomous community: Asturias
- Province: Asturias
- Municipality: Illas

Illas (variant: San Julián) is one of three parishes (administrative divisions) in Illas, a municipality within the province and autonomous community of Asturias, by northern Spain's Picos de Europa mountains.

== Villages ==
- La Barrera
- La Braña
- Calaveru
- Faéu
- Fonte
- Friera
- La Llaguna
- La Llanaváu
- La Lláscara
- Pole
- Taborneda
- Trexu
- Vega
- La Ventanueva
- Viesques
- Xuyana
