= Tameza =

- Parish
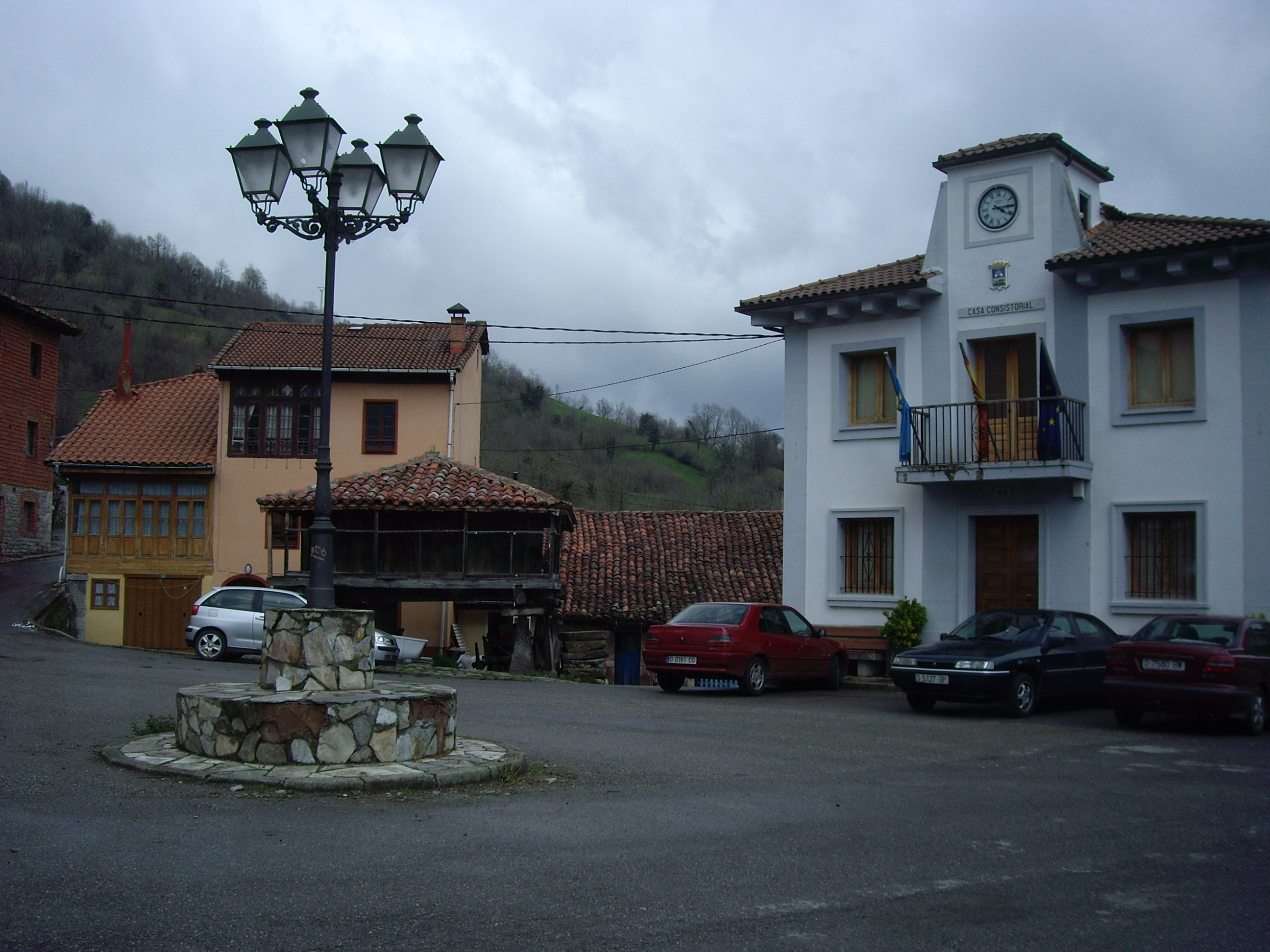
- Plaza Villabre in Tameza
- Interactive map of Tameza
- Country: Spain
- Autonomous community: Asturias
- Province: Asturias
- Municipality: Yernes y Tameza

Population
  - Total: 99

Tameza is one of two parishes (administrative divisions) in Yernes y Tameza, a municipality within the province and autonomous community of Asturias, in northern Spain.

Situated at 900 m (3,000 ft) above sea level, the parroquia is 14.74 km^{2} (5.69 sq mi) in size, with a population of 97 (INE 2009). The time zone is UTC+1(+2DT).

== Villages and hamlets ==
- Villabre (municipal capital) (43.25°N 6.116667°W)
- Fojó (Fuxóu)
- Villarruíz (Villuarrí)

== Natural wonders ==
- Caldoveiro Peak
