= La Peral =

- Parish
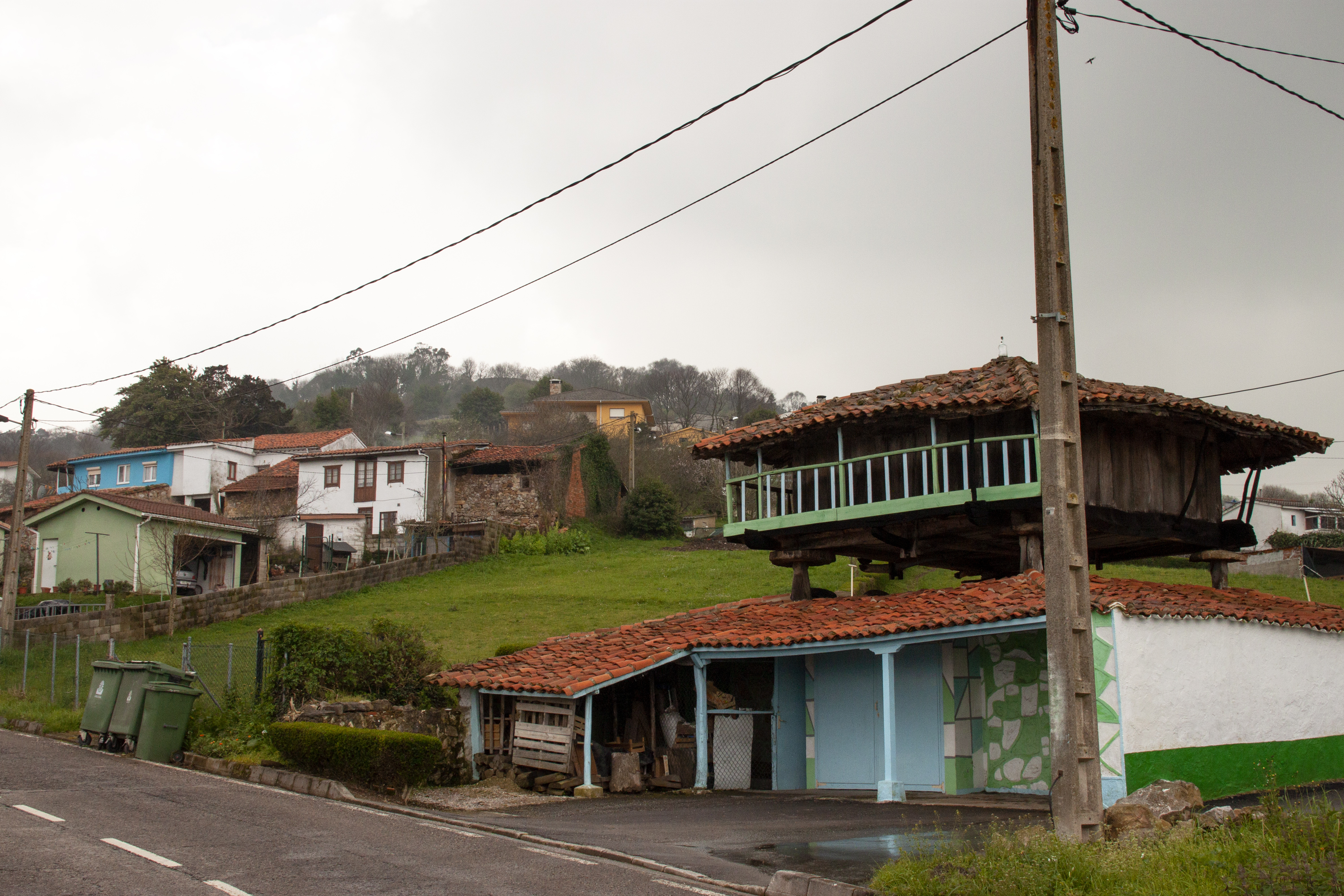
- La Peral in Asturias, Spain

- Location within Spain
- Coordinates: 43.483333°N 6°W
- Country: Asturies
- Elevation: 360 m (1,180 ft)

Population (2011)
  - Total: 234
- Postal code: 33414

La Peral (variant: San Jorge) is one of three parishes (administrative divisions) in Illas, a municipality of Asturias, by northern Iberic Picos de Europa mountains.

== Demography ==
Source: Instituto Nacional de Estadística (Spain) -

== Villages ==
- L'Argañosa
- La Peral
- Reconcu
- Rozaflor
