= Yernes =

Coordinates: 43.283333°N 6.1°W

- Parish
- Interactive map of Yernes
- Country: Spain
- Autonomous community: Asturias
- Province: Asturias
- Municipality: Yernes y Tameza

Population
  - Total: 88

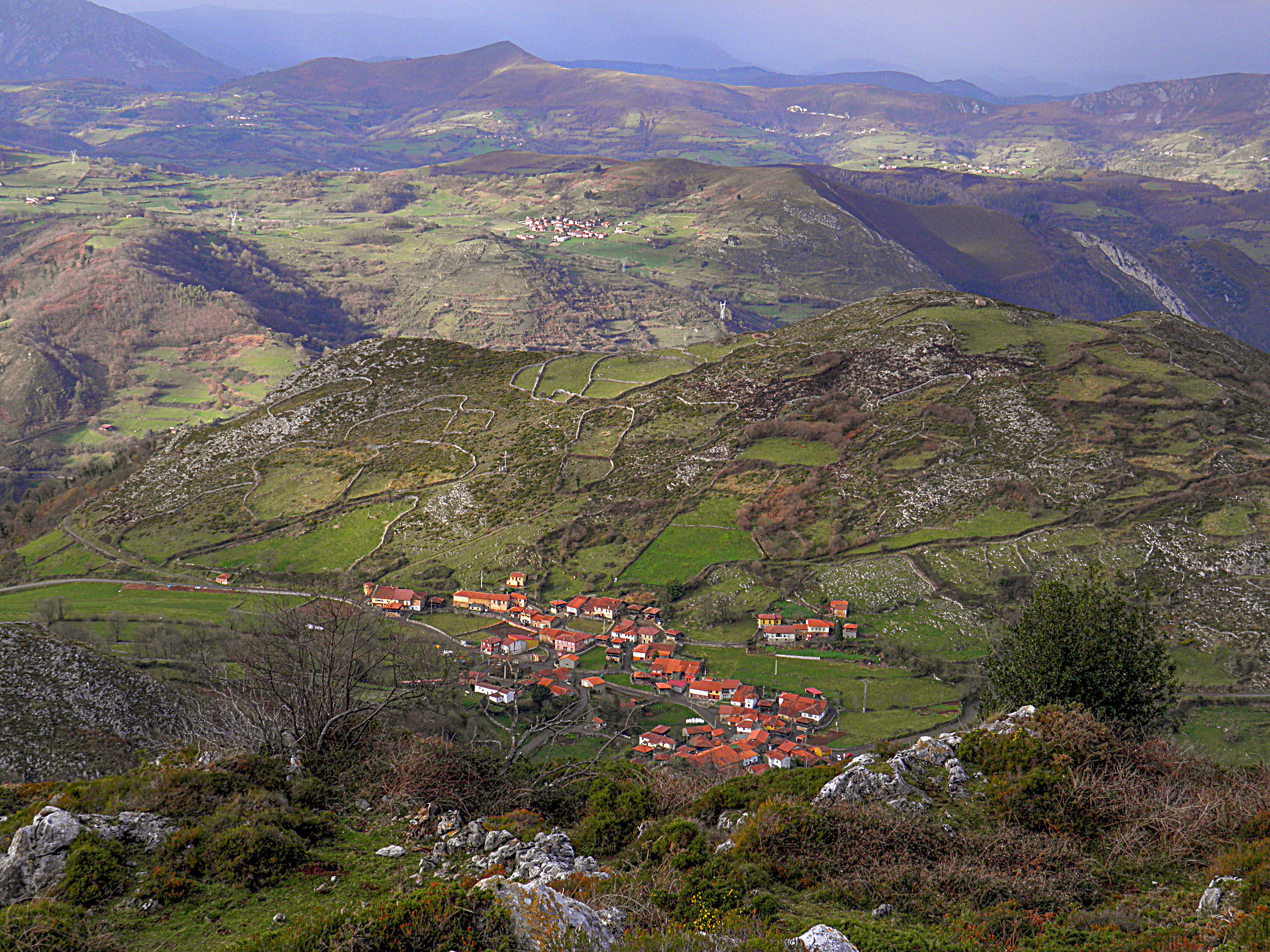
Aerial photograph of Yernes

Yernes is one of two parishes (administrative divisions) in Yernes y Tameza, a municipality within the province and autonomous community of Asturias, in northern Spain.

Situated at 923 m (3,028 ft) above sea level, the parroquia is 14.74 km^{2} (5.69 sq mi) in size, with a population of 88 (INE 2009). The time zone is UTC+1(+2DT).

== Villages and hamlets ==
- Vendillés (Vindiés)
- Yernes

== Natural wonders ==
- Caldoveiro Peak
