= San Julián (Bimenes) =

Santuyano/San Julián
- Parish
- Location within Spain
- Country: Spain
- Autonomous community: Asturias
- Province: Asturias
- Municipality: Bimenes

Population (2011)
  - Total: 829

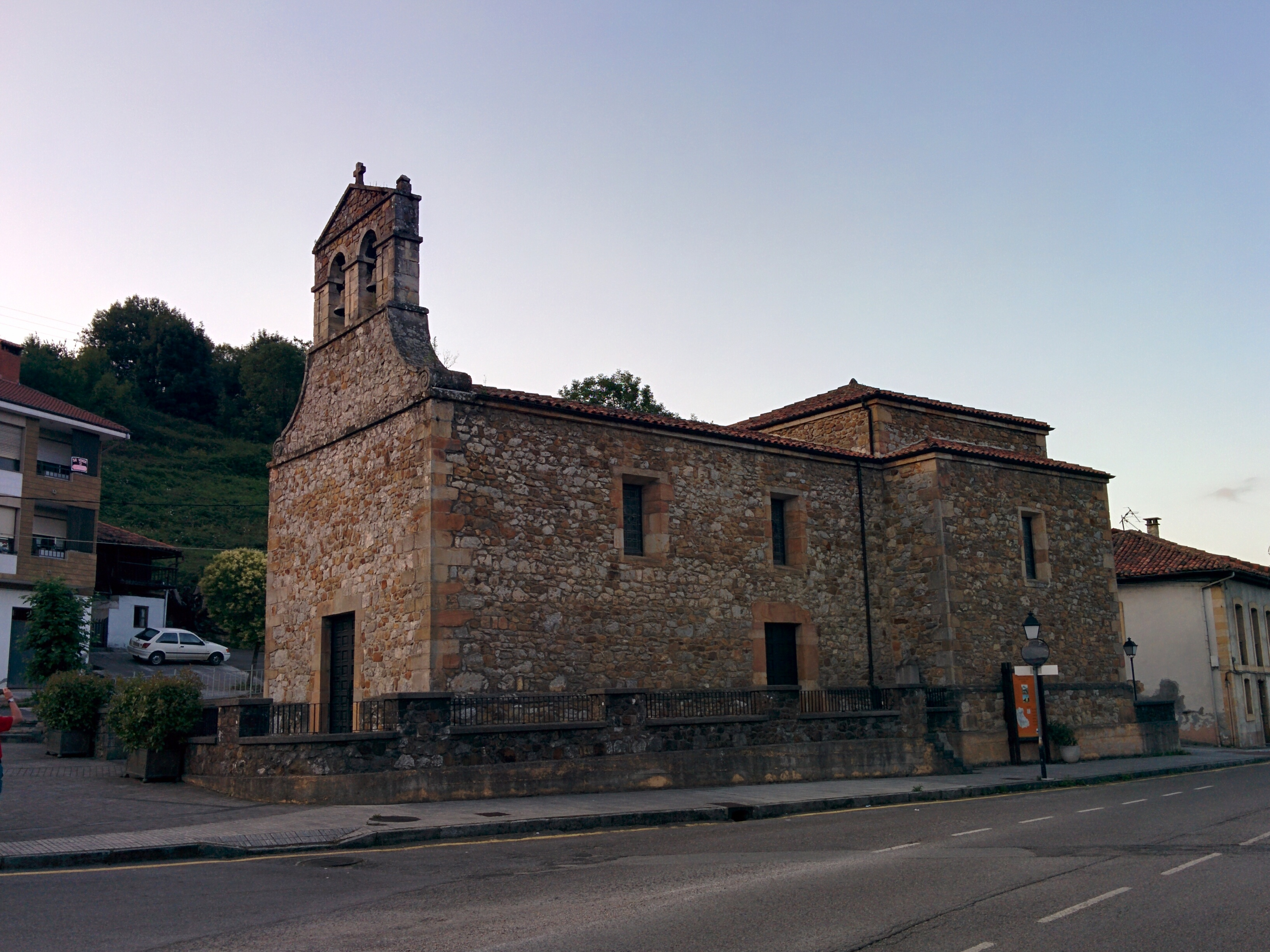
Church of San Julian of Bimenes

San Julián (Asturian: Santuyano, official name is bilingual, Santuyano/San Julián) is one of three parishes (administrative divisions) in Bimenes, a municipality within the province and autonomous community of Asturias, in northern Spain.

It is 11.82 km^{2} (4.56 sq mi) in size with a population of 829.

== Villages ==
- Campabaxera
- Cantili Baxo
- Cantili Riba
- Carbayal
- Castiillu
- Costru
- El Capellán
- El Cubilón
- El Cuitu
- El Faíu
- El Gronxu
- El Llamargón
- El Lloroscu
- El Llosón
- El Montiquín
- El Perezal
- El Praón
- El Prou Río
- El Rebullu
- El Valle
- El Xerrón
- L'Acebal
- L'Azorea
- L'Escobal
- La Brañuca
- La Casa Riba
- La Castañal
- La Correoria
- La Cuesta
- La Cuesta la Riba
- La Figar
- La Fragua
- La Quintana
- La Riba
- La Rubiera
- La Segá
- La Vega Solavilla
- La Vegona
- La Xerruca
- Les Collaes
- Les Vallines
- Los Xugueros
- Martimporra
- Puentevega
- Ricóu
- Rosuaria
- Samiguel
- Santuyano / San Julián
- Solavega
- Tuenes
