= Santu Medero =

Santu Medero San Emeterio
- Parish
- Location within Spain
- Coordinates: 43°20′10″N 5°34′6″W
- Country: Spain
- Autonomous community: Asturias
- Province: Asturias
- Municipality: Bimenes

Area
  - Total: 15.53 km^{2} (6.00 sq mi)

Population (2024)
  - Total: 689
  - Density: 44.4/km^{2} (115/sq mi)

Santu Medero (Spanish: San Emeterio) is one of three parishes in Bimenes, a municipality within the province and autonomous community of Asturias, in northern Spain.

It is 15.53 km^{2} (6.00 sq mi) in size with a population of 689 as of January 1, 2024.

== Villages ==
- La Solana
- Berizosa (La Brizosa)
- Cardeli (Cardili)
- Castañera
- Cirgüeyalín (El Cirueyalín)
- Cuestespines (Costispines)
- El Caleyo (El Caliyu)
- El Bocellal
- El Robledal (El Robedal)
- Fayacaba
- Fontanina (La Fontanina)
- Fontoria
- Mesnada (L'Ambesná)
- La Casilla (La Casiilla)
- La Llera
- La Presa
- La Roza
- La Vara
- La Velía
- Melendreros
- Mellao (El Mayóu)
- Molín del Muriu
- Oñardi
- Peña Plano (La Peña'l Plonu)
- Pedrero (El Pedríu)
- Piñera
- Pumar (El Pumar)
- Rebollal (El Rebollal)
- Recimuro (El Recimuru)
- Robudiellu (El Rebudiillu)
- Rozadas (Rozaes)
- Santa Gadía (Santagadía)
- Segredal (El Segredal)
- Sienra (Xenra)
- Taballes (Tavayes)
- Viñay (Viñái)
