= Gijón (comarca) =

Coordinates: 43°31′20″N 5°38′27″W

- Comarca
- Flag Coat of arms
- Country: Spain
- Autonomous community: Asturias
- Province: Asturias
- Capital: Gijón / Xixón
- Municipalities: List: Villaviciosa, Xixón, Carreño

Area
  - Total: 518 km^{2} (200 sq mi)

Population
  - Total: 301,171
  - Density: 581/km^{2} (1,510/sq mi)
- Time zone: UTC+1 (CET)
  - Summer (DST): UTC+2 (CEST)

Gijón (or, in Asturian, Xixón; official name: Gijón/Xixón) is one of eight comarcas (this is the Spanish word; the Asturian is cotarros), administrative divisions of Asturias, which is a province and an autonomous community in Spain.

The comarca of Gijón is divided into three municipalities (in Asturian conceyos). From east to west they are:

- Villaviciosa
- Gijón / Xixón
- Carreño
