= Caudal (comarca) =

Administrative division of Asturias, Spain

Coordinates: 43°08′47″N 5°42′59″W

- Comarca
- Country: Spain
- Autonomous community: Asturias
- Province: Asturias
- Capital: Mieres
- Municipalities: List: Lena, Aller, Mieres

Area
  - Total: 823.89 km^{2} (318.11 sq mi)

Population (2003)
  - Total: 75,575
  - Density: 91.729/km^{2} (237.58/sq mi)
- Time zone: UTC+1 (CET)
  - Summer (DST): UTC+2 (CEST)

Caudal is one of 8 comarcas administrative divisions of Asturias, an autonomous community in Spain.

The comarca of Caudal is divided into three municipalities. They are:

- Lena
- Aller
- Mieres
