= Oviedo (comarca) =

Coordinates: 43°19′26″N 5°52′38″W

- Comarca
- Flag Coat of arms
- Country: Spain
- Autonomous community: Asturias
- Province: Asturias
- Capital: Oviedo
- Municipalities: List: Cabranes, Nava, Sariego, Bimenes, Sieru, Noreña, Oviedo, Llanera, Las Regueras, Ribera de Arriba, Morcín, Riosa, Santo Adriano, Grado, Quirós, Teverga, Proaza, Yernes y Tameza, Somiedo, Salas, Miranda

Area
  - Total: 2,323 km^{2} (897 sq mi)

Population
  - Total: 263,298
  - Density: 113.3/km^{2} (293.6/sq mi)
- Time zone: UTC+1 (CET)
  - Summer (DST): UTC+2 (CEST)

Oviedo is one of 8 comarcas of the province and autonomous community of Asturias in Spain.

The comarca is formed by 21 municipalities (municipios). From east to west they are:

- Cabranes
- Nava
- Sariegu
- Bimenes
- Siero
- Noreña
- Oviedo
- Llanera
- Les Regueres
- Ribera de Arriba
- Morcín
- Riosa
- Santu Adrianu
- Grau
- Quirós
- Teberga
- Proaza
- Yernes y Tameza
- Somiedu
- Salas
- Miranda
