= Yernes y Tameza =

- Municipality
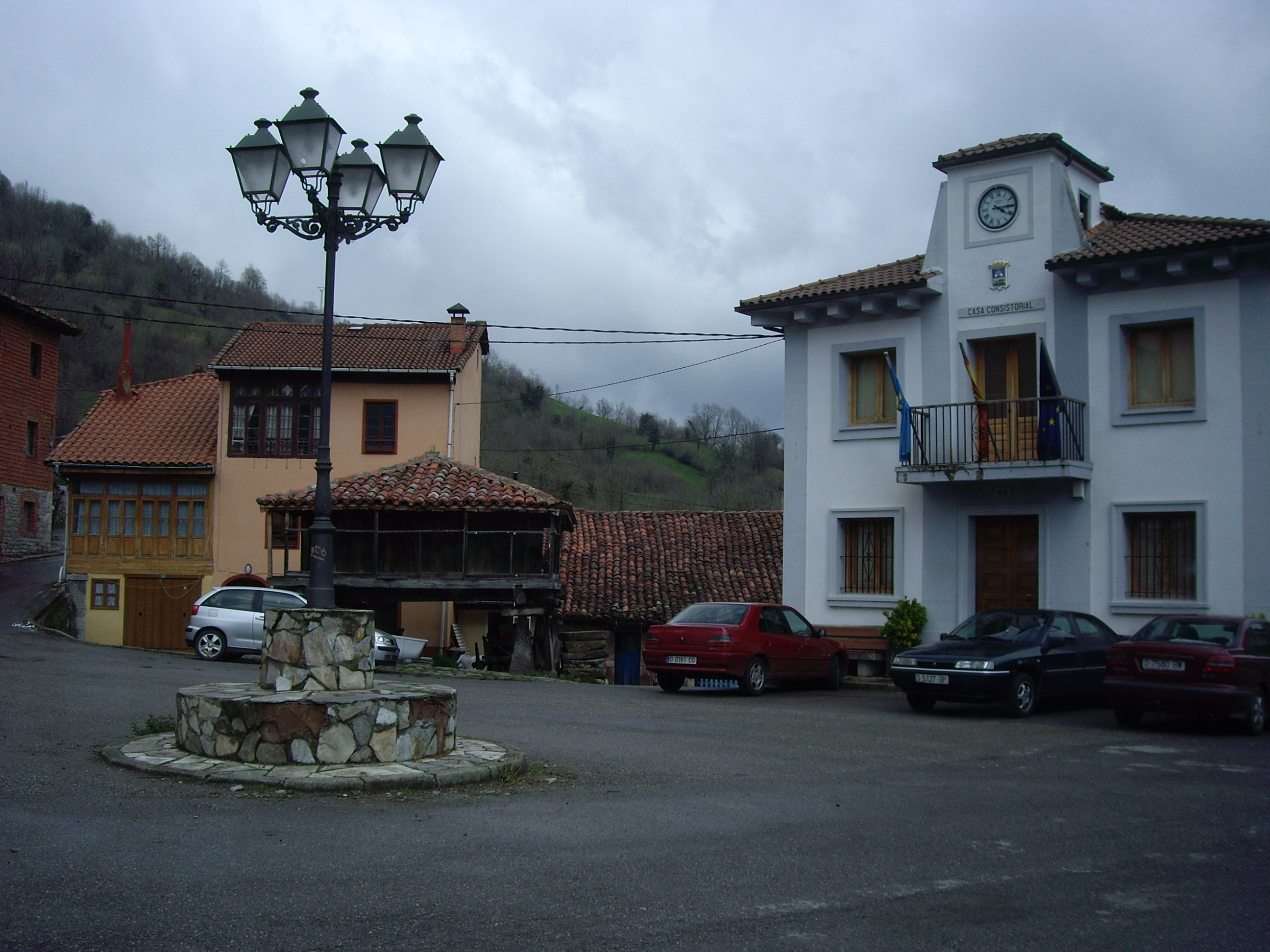

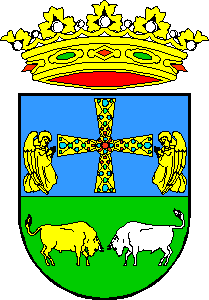
- Coat of arms

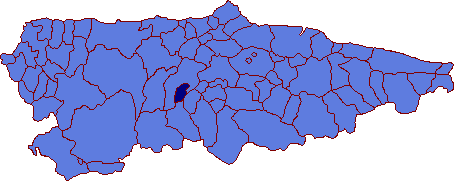

- Location in Spain
- Coordinates: 43°15′0″N 6°7′45″W
- Country: Spain
- Autonomous community: Asturias
- Province: Asturias
- Comarca: Oviedo
- Judicial district: Grado
- Capital: Villabre

Government
  - Alcalde: María Díaz Fidalgo (PSOE)

Area
  - Total: 31.63 km^{2} (12.21 sq mi)
- Highest elevation: 1,374 m (4,508 ft)

Population (2025-01-01)
  - Total: 134
  - Density: 4.24/km^{2} (11.0/sq mi)
- Demonym: tamezano
- Time zone: UTC+1 (CET)
  - Summer (DST): UTC+2 (CEST)
- Postal code: 33826
- Website: https://www.yernesytameza.es/

Yernes y Tameza is a municipality in the Autonomous Community of the Principality of Asturias, Spain. It is situated in the east-central zone of the principality, between mountains high along the Cubia River. It is bordered on the west, north, and northeast by Grado, on the southeast by Proaza, and on the south by Teverga. The municipality has an abrupt topography, most notable in the peak Caldoveiru (1,357 m) and the Tameza River, which crosses the municipality from south to north.

With 133 inhabitants according to the 2023 National Census, it is the least populated municipality in Asturias.

The province is named after its two parishes, Yernes and Tameza ("y" is Spanish for "and"). The capital is Villabre; other villages include: Fuxóu, Vindías, Villuarrí, and Yernes.

The people practice high mountain ranching and subsistence agriculture. In livestock, cattle and horses are the most important, in particular the Asturian mountain breeds, such as the Asturcon. The most frequently cultivated crops are the potato, cereal, vegetables, and hay.

== Geography ==
The municipality encompasses the majority of the Villalibre River basin, which is a tributary of the Cubia River and exerts an influence upon it in the neighbouring municipality of Grado. The river has its source in the Marabiu mountains and flows down to the valley that separates the Yernes y Tameza into two distinct sections, each exhibiting a unique set of terrestrial characteristics. The western bank is characterised by an undulating topography, comprising a series of hills and ridges. Conversely, the terrain on the eastern bank is relatively flat and extensive.

The municipal term is situated at an altitude ranging from 400 to 1,200 meters, with slopes exceeding 21% in more than half of the surface area. The landscape is characterised by mountain ranges. In the northern part of Yernes y Tamanza, mountains such as Güey Morto and La Lloural, which are composed of siliceous rock, are prevalent. In contrast, limestone rock is the most common geological feature in the southern part of the municipality. This is exemplified by mountains such as Caldoveiro Peak, which are surrounded by ponds, chasms and caves such as Cuallagar.

== History ==
The area was inhabited during the prehistoric and Roman periods, as evidenced by the discovery of lithic remains in numerous caves within the municipality. Additionally, during the initial decades of the 20th century, gold medals from the Roman Empire were unearthed in the village of Fuxóu.

The first documented mention of Tameza is found in a document in which King Ordoño I of Asturias made a donation to the Cathedral of San Salvador in Oviedo in 857. In 1086, a number of noblemen bequeathed half of their territory to the cathedral. In 1174, Ferdinand II of León transferred his rights over the remaining half of the territory to the Church of Oviedo, which was subsequently established as an episcopal municipality, as evidenced by the municipal coat of arms. In 1579, a papal bull from Pope Gregory XIII allowed Philip II of Spain to confiscate the territory and return it to the Spanish Crown.

Two years later, the 130 inhabitants purchased the territory from the king for 12,691,922 maravedíes, thereby establishing their own municipality or conceyu. Juan de Grijalva, the king's representative, appointed the inaugural town councillors and tasked them with formulating the municipality's ordinances. These responsibilities were subsequently undertaken by two magistrates, two councillors, a mayor of the Hermandad, and an agent for the nobility, as well as a judge, a councillor, and another mayor of the Hermandad for the general public. The municipality's capital was established in Villabre in 1584.

It is said that, to determine the limit with neighboring municipality Proaza, it was agreed that two bulls would fight, one from each municipality, with the boundary being the point reached by the winning bull. The bull representing Yernes y Tameza, from the village of Yernes, would have been the winner, despite being smaller. Because of this, the coat of arms of Yernes y Tameza includes two fighting bulls.

In recent years, Yernes y Tameza has been in the spotlight of the Spanish media because, due to depopulation, there is not enough population to fill the vacant posts in the municipal administration when workers take sick leaves, forcing the mayor and the local population to take in their roles.

== Demography ==
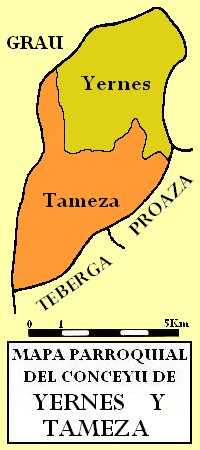
Yernes y Tameza

== Art ==
The municipality is not especially noted for its architecture. It has two chapels dedicated to Santiago and Santa Cristina de Lena, and there are parish churches of Santa María de Tameza and Santa Cruz de Yernes.

Among its vernacular architecture, the most notable is an ancient palace with a chapel that belonged to the family López del Vallado. There are also the remains of a tower near the capital.

== Transport ==
=== Road ===
The municipality is traversed by a provincial road, several minor roads and unpaved mountain roads.

AS-311

== See also ==
- List of municipalities in Asturias
