= Narcea (comarca) =

- Comarca
- Flag Coat of arms
- Coordinates: 43°07′59″N 6°37′29″W
- Country: Spain
- Autonomous community: Asturias
- Province: Asturias
- Municipalities: List: Ibias, Degaña, Cangas del Narcea, Allande, Tineo

Area
  - Total: 2,043 km^{2} (789 sq mi)

Population
  - Total: 34,534
  - Density: 16.90/km^{2} (43.78/sq mi)
- Time zone: UTC+1 (CET)
  - Summer (DST): UTC+2 (CEST)

Narcea is one of 8 comarcas administrative divisions of Asturias, which is a province and an autonomous community in Spain.

The comarca of Narcea is divided into five municipalities (in Asturian conceyos). From south to north they are:

- Ibias
- Degaña
- Cangas del Narcea
- Allande
- Tineo
