= Oriente (comarca) =

Coordinates: 43°20′37″N 4°59′02″W

- Comarca
- Flag Coat of arms
- Country: Spain
- Autonomous community: Asturias
- Province: Asturias
- Municipalities: List: Ribadedeva, Peñamellera Baja, Peñamellera Alta, Cabrales, Llanes, Onís, Cangas de Onís, Ribadesella, Amieva, Parres, Caravia, Colunga, Piloña, Ponga

Area
  - Total: 1,922 km^{2} (742 sq mi)

Population
  - Total: 53,203
  - Density: 27.68/km^{2} (71.69/sq mi)
- Time zone: UTC+1 (CET)
  - Summer (DST): UTC+2 (CEST)

Oriente is one of 8 comarcas administrative divisions of Asturias, which is a province and an autonomous community in Spain .

The comarca of Oriente is divided into fourteen administrative regions (in Asturian conceyos). From east to west they are

- Ribadedeva
- Peñamellera Baxa
- Peñamellera Alta
- Cabrales
- Llanes
- Onís
- Cangues d'Onís
- Ribesella
- Amieva
- Parres
- Caravia
- Colunga
- Piloña
- Ponga
