= Ribadedeva =

Ribadedeva Ribadeva
- Municipality
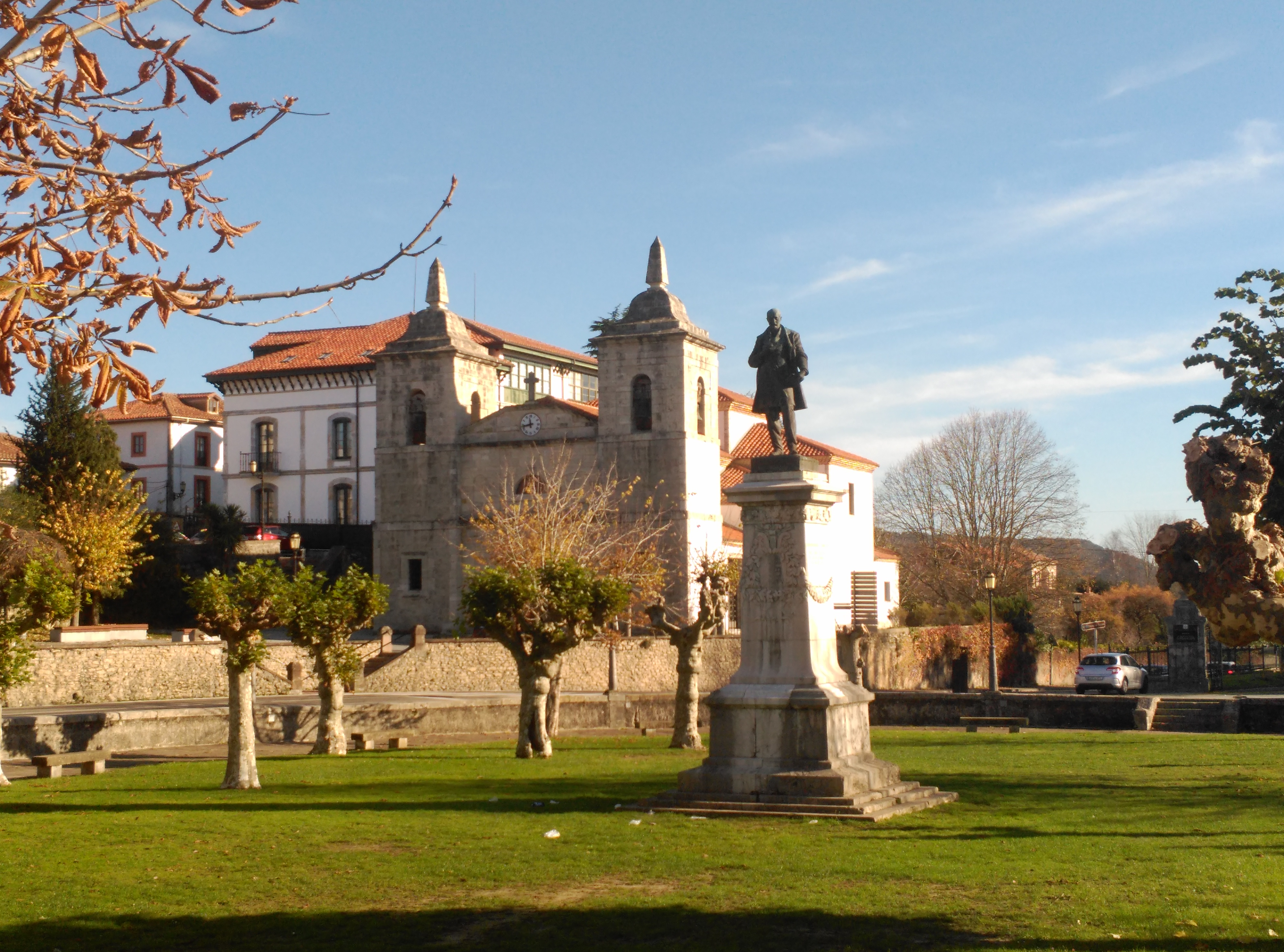
- Park of Colombres and Saint Mary Church.

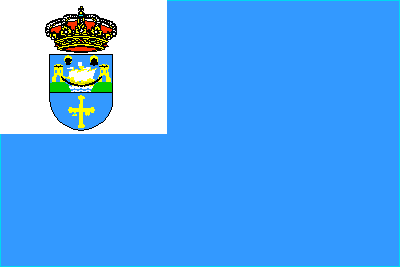
- Flag Coat of arms

- Location in Asturias Location in Spain
- Coordinates: 43°22′17″N 4°33′52″W
- Country: Spain
- Autonomous community: Asturias
- Province: Asturias
- Comarca: Oriente
- Judicial district: Llanes
- Capital: Colombres

Government
  - Alcalde: Alejandro Reimóndez Cantero (PSOE)

Area
  - Total: 35.66 km^{2} (13.77 sq mi)
- Highest elevation: 605 m (1,985 ft)

Population (2025-01-01)
  - Total: 1,693
  - Density: 47.48/km^{2} (123.0/sq mi)
- Demonym: ribadedense
- Time zone: UTC+1 (CET)
  - Summer (DST): UTC+2 (CEST)
- Postal code: 33590

Ribadedeva (Spanish pronunciation: [riβaðeˈðeβa]; Asturian and Cantabrian: Ribadeva) is a municipality in the Autonomous Community of the Principality of Asturias, Spain. To the north is the Cantabrian Sea, while to the south lies Peñamellera Baja, to the west Llanes and to the east, across the Deva River, the Autonomous Community of Cantabria.

== Parishes ==
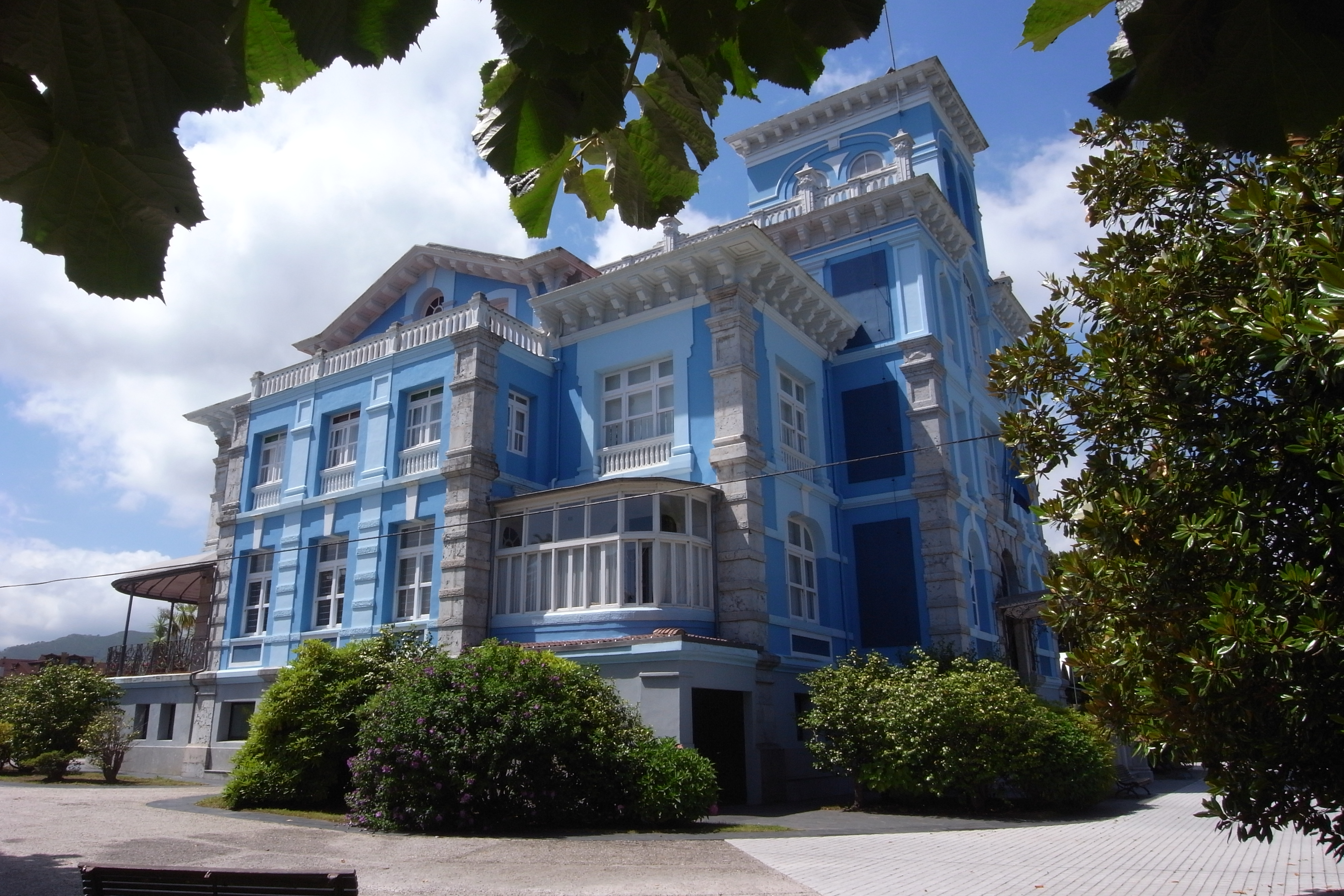
Quinta Guadalupe, Indianos historic archive

- Colombres
- Noriega
- Villanueva

== See also ==
- List of municipalities in Asturias
