= Ribera de Arriba =

Ribera de Arriba La Ribera (Asturian)
- Municipality
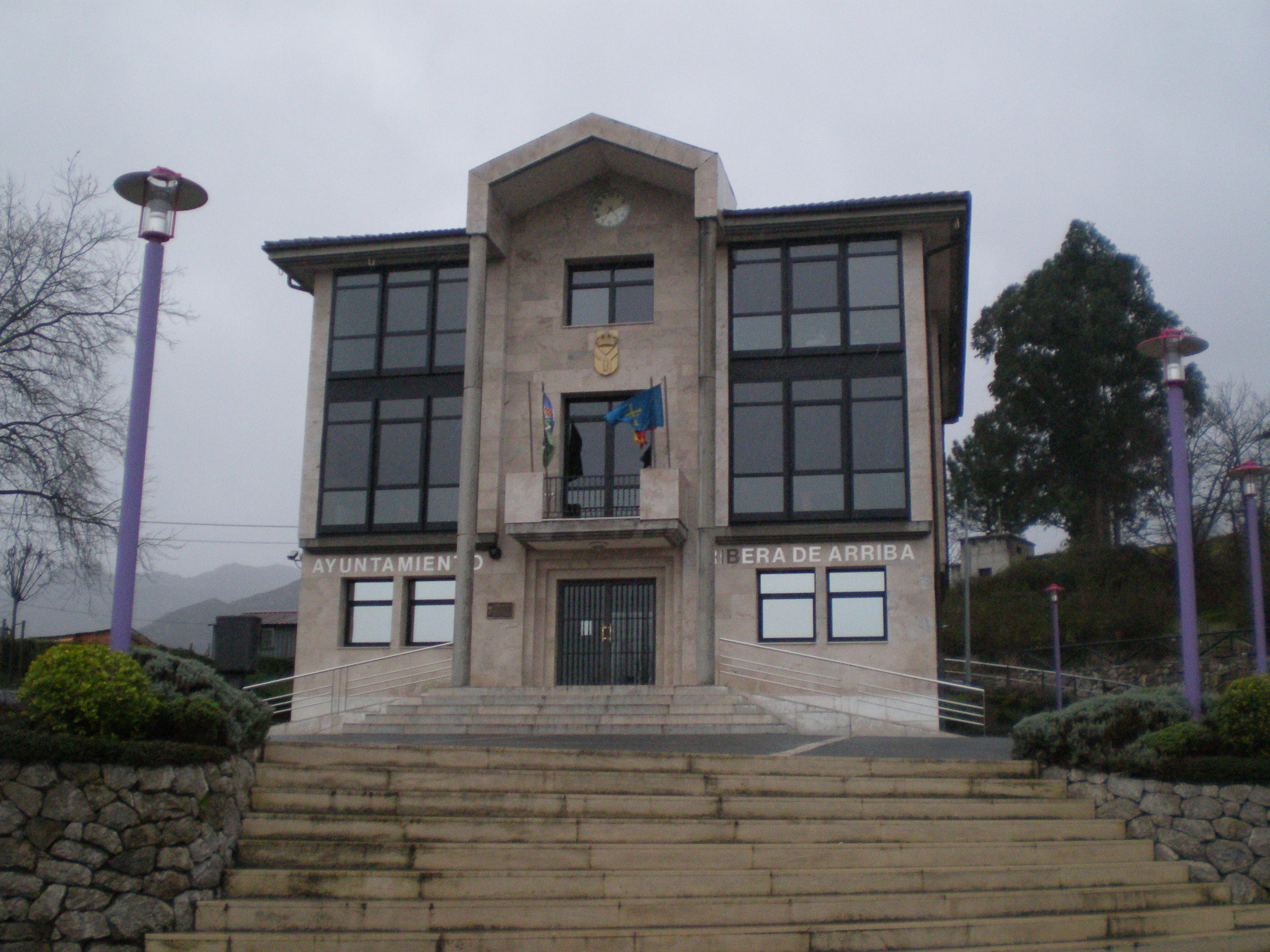
- Town Hall

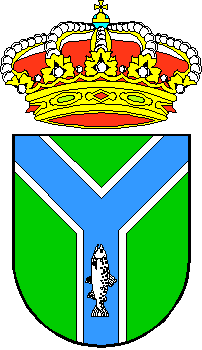
- Flag Coat of arms

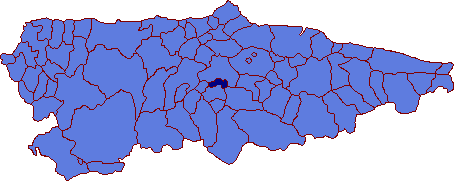

- Location in Spain
- Coordinates: 43°18′30″N 5°52′30″W
- Country: Spain
- Autonomous community: Asturias
- Province: Asturias
- Comarca: Oviedo
- Judicial district: Oviedo
- Capital: Soto Ribera

Government
  - Alcalde: José Ramón García Saiz (PSOE)

Area
  - Total: 21.98 km^{2} (8.49 sq mi)
- Highest elevation: 648 m (2,126 ft)

Population (2025-01-01)
  - Total: 1,852
  - Density: 84.26/km^{2} (218.2/sq mi)
- Time zone: UTC+1 (CET)
  - Summer (DST): UTC+2 (CEST)
- Website: Official website

Ribera de Arriba (Asturian: La Ribera, and both officially) is a municipality in the Autonomous Community of the Principality of Asturias, Spain. It is bordered on the north and east by Oviedo, on the south by Mieres and Morcín, and on the west by Santo Adriano. As of 2010, it has a population of 2,009.

== Parishes ==
- Ferreros
- Palombar
- Perera
- Soto Ribera
- Teyego

== See also ==
- List of municipalities in Asturias
