= Riosa =

- Municipality
- Flag Coat of arms

- Location in Spain
- Coordinates: 43°12′N 5°54′W
- Country: Spain
- Autonomous community: Asturias
- Province: Asturias
- Comarca: Oviedo
- Capital: La Vega

Government
  - Alcalde: José Antonio Muñiz Álvarez (PSOE)

Area
  - Total: 46.49 km^{2} (17.95 sq mi)
- Highest elevation: 1,773 m (5,817 ft)

Population (2025-01-01)
  - Total: 1,686
  - Density: 36.27/km^{2} (93.93/sq mi)
- Demonym: riosano/a
- Time zone: UTC+1 (CET)
  - Summer (DST): UTC+2 (CEST)
- Postal code: 33160

Riosa is a municipality and parish (administrative division) in the Autonomous Community of the Principality of Asturias, Spain. It is situated in the central mountains of Asturias. Its capital is La Vega.

== See also ==
- List of municipalities in Asturias
