= Onís =

- Municipality
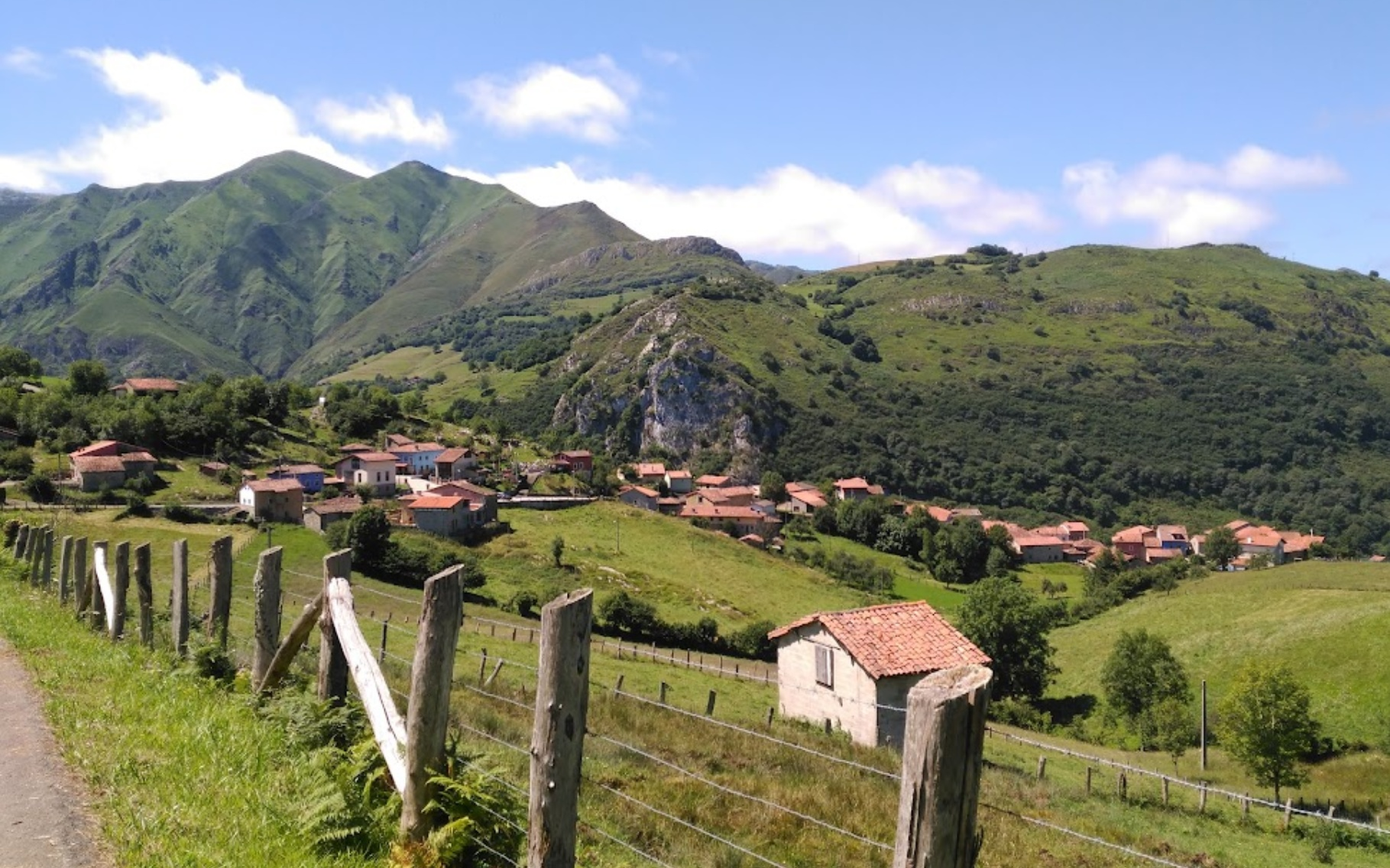
- Demués, Bobia, Onís

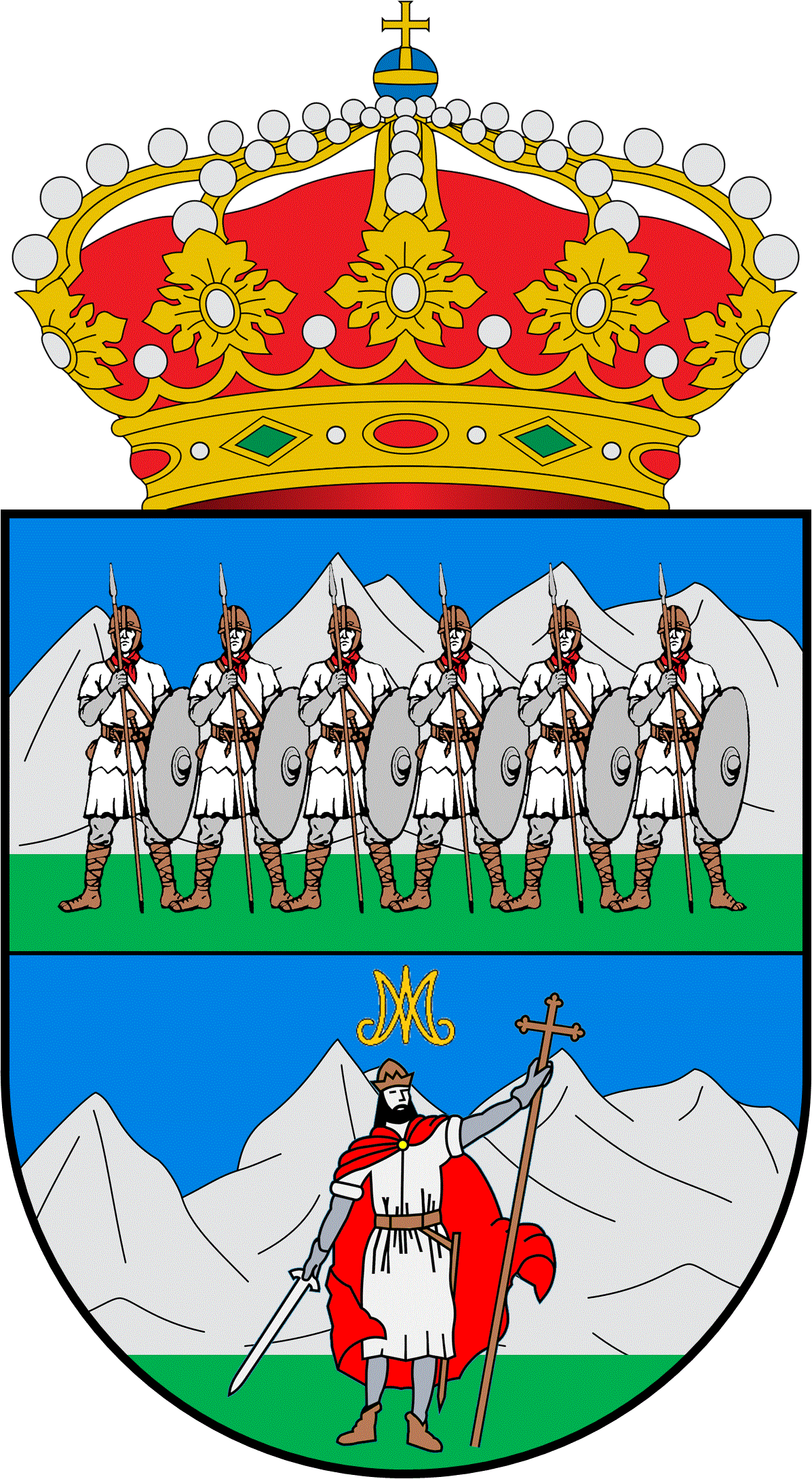
- Coat of arms

- Location in Spain
- Coordinates: 43°20′7″N 4°58′3″W
- Country: Spain
- Autonomous community: Asturias
- Province: Asturias
- Comarca: Oriente
- Judicial district: Cangas de Onís
- Capital: Benia de Onís

Government
  - Alcalde: José Antonio González Gutiérrez (PSOE)

Area
  - Total: 75.42 km^{2} (29.12 sq mi)
- Highest elevation: 2,129 m (6,985 ft)

Population (2023)
  - Total: 746
  - Density: 9.89/km^{2} (25.6/sq mi)
- Time zone: UTC+1 (CET)
  - Summer (DST): UTC+2 (CEST)
- Postal code: 33556
- Website: Official website

Onís is a municipality in the autonomous community of Asturias, Spain. As of 2023, the population of the municipality equaled 746. Onís is bordered on the north by Llanes, on the south by the province of León, to the east by Cabrales and to the west by Cangas de Onís. The area of the municipality is 75 km^{2}, with more than a third of its territory falling within Picos de Europa National Park. the Pico de Verdilluenga, one of the peaks of the Picos de Europa, is the highest point in the municipality, standing at 2,129 m. The municipality comprises three parishes:

- Onís, which contains the settlements of Benia (the municipal capital), Avín, El Castru, Los Menores, Pandellavandes, Silviella, Talaveru, and Villar;
- Bobia, which contains the settlements of Bobia de Abajo (Bovia Baxu), Bobia de Arriba (Bovia Riba), Demués, and Gamonéu; and
- La Robellada, which contains the settlements of La Robellada and El Pedroso (Pedrosu).

== History ==
Onís has been inhabited by humans since the Neolithic period following the last Ice Age. Artifacts from both the Roman and Moorish conquests of the area have both been discovered, though both peoples were later expulsed from the region. Onís was recorded as sending a representative, Pedro Suárez, to support Pedro I before the Castilian Civil War in the 14th century. It was first recognized as a municipality in 1504 and had its first representative, Juan González de Acebos, in the General Junta of the Principality of Asturias in 1594. During the French invasion of Spain, the French army inhabited the area during its occupation of Asturias. The municipality would suffer further damage as a result of the Third Carlist War and the Spanish Civil War.

In modern times, the agricultural sector continues to be the largest employer in Onís, as it has been throughout its history. The municipality was home to the recipients of the 1994 Premio al Pueblo Ejemplar de Asturias, which recognizes Asturian peoples and villages which are deemed remarkable in their defense of their cultural heritage and values.

== See also ==
- List of municipalities in Asturias
