= Nalón (comarca) =

Coordinates: 43°14′12″N 5°31′49″W

- Comarca
- Flag Coat of arms
- Country: Spain
- Autonomous community: Asturias
- Province: Asturias
- Municipalities: List: Casu, Sobrescobiu, Llaviana, Samartín del Rei Aureliu, Llangréu

Area
  - Total: 647 km^{2} (250 sq mi)

Population
  - Total: 84,790
  - Density: 131/km^{2} (339/sq mi)
- Time zone: UTC+1 (CET)
  - Summer (DST): UTC+2 (CEST)

Nalón is one of 8 comarcas, administrative divisions of Asturias, which is a province and an autonomous community in Spain. It has 83,.000 inhabitants. The Nalón valley was an important point during the 19th and 20th centuries thanks to the siderurgy and mining industry.

The comarca of Nalón is divided into five municipalities (in Asturian Conceyos). From south to north they are (in each case giving the Spanish-language name, followed by the Asturian, if different):

- Caso (Casu)
- Sobrescobio (Sobrescobiu)
- Laviana (Llaviana)
- San Martín del Rey Aurelio (Samartín del Rei Aureliu)
- Langreo (Llangréu)

== Gallery ==
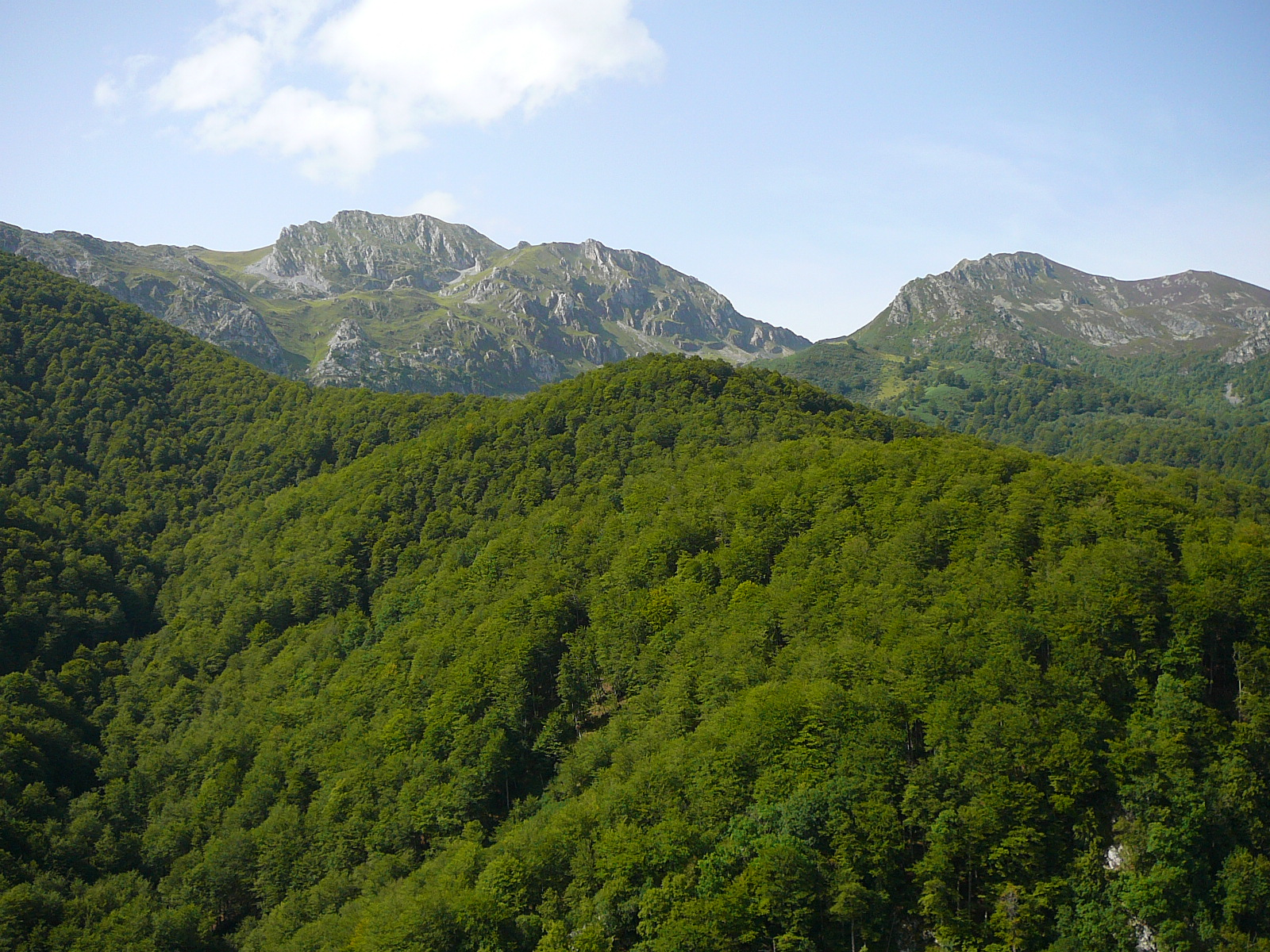
Redes Natural Park
