= Illas =

- Municipality
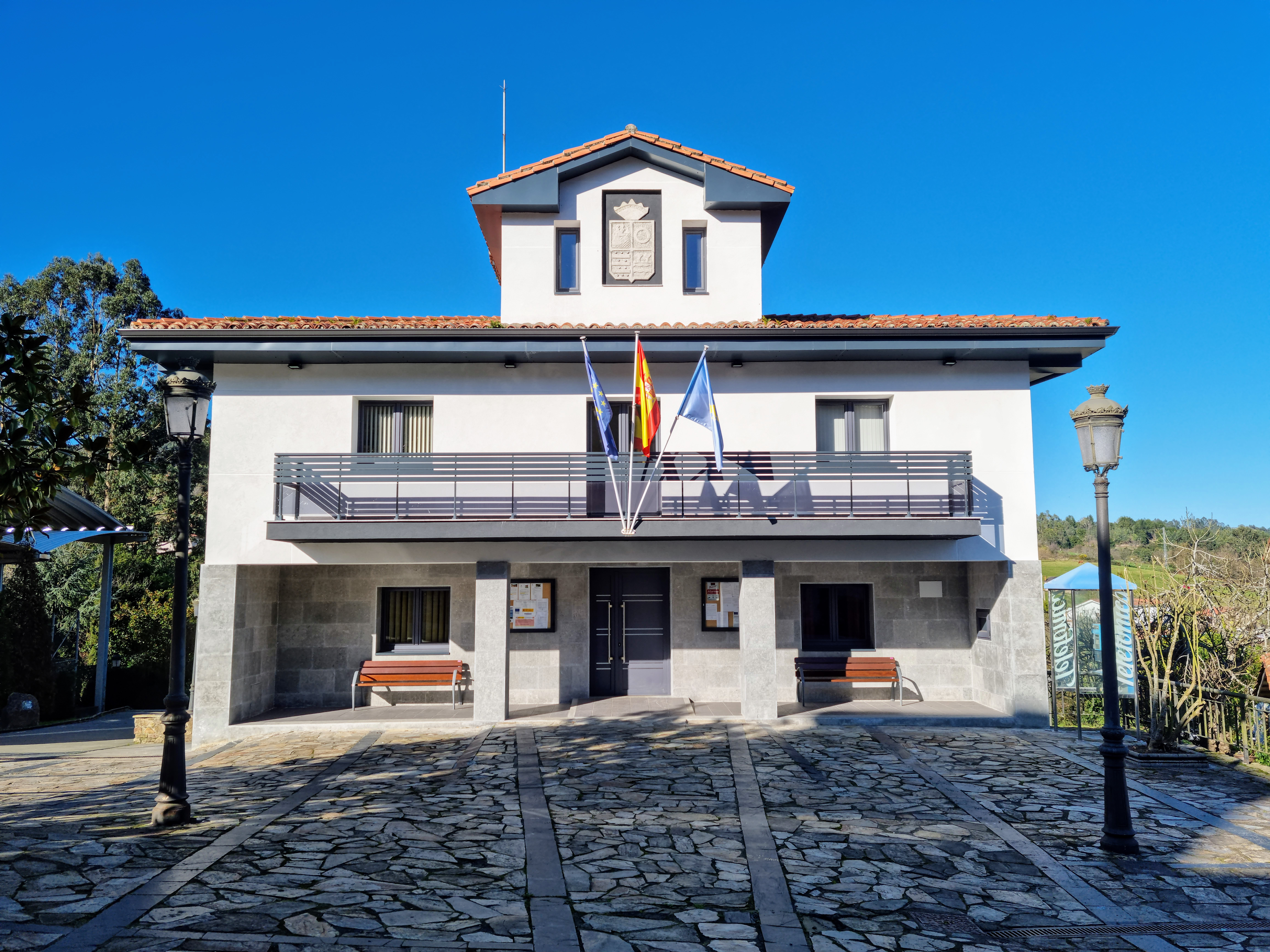

- Coat of arms

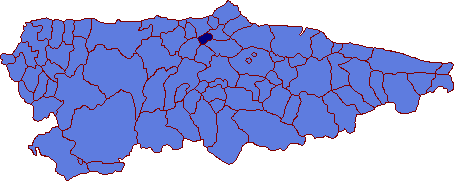

- Location in Spain
- Coordinates: 43°30′N 5°58′W
- Country: Spain
- Autonomous community: Asturias
- Province: Asturias
- Comarca: Avilés
- Judicial district: Avilés
- Capital: Callezuela

Government
  - Alcalde: Fernando Alberto Tirador Martínez (IU)

Area
  - Total: 25.51 km^{2} (9.85 sq mi)
- Highest elevation: 619 m (2,031 ft)

Population (2025-01-01)
  - Total: 1,048
  - Density: 41.08/km^{2} (106.4/sq mi)
- Time zone: UTC+1 (CET)
  - Summer (DST): UTC+2 (CEST)
- Official language(s): Asturian, Spanish

Illas is a municipality in Asturias, Spain, located in the western central part of the province and bordered by the municipalities of Castrillón, Candamo, Llanera, and Corvera de Asturias.

== Parishes ==
There are three parishes (administrative divisions):

- Illas
- La Peral
- Villa

== Geography ==
The area of Illas is very hilly. One of the most remarkable is the Pico Gorfolí with a height of 619 meters above sea level. The county of Avilés, Cabo Peñas, and the Bay of Biscay can be viewed from Pico Gorfolí. If the sky is cloudless, one can observe the Picos de Europa.

== Economy ==
The county has an economy based on agricultural and cattle trading. This is reflected in two kinds of cheeses, the cheese of La Peral and Taborneda known as "Gorfolí".

With the arrival of the industry at Avilés, a lot of workers went there from the county of Illas to work on the new productive processes.

== See also ==
- List of municipalities in Asturias
