= Villabre =

Spanish village in the region of Asturias

Coordinates: 43°15′05″N 6°07′40″W

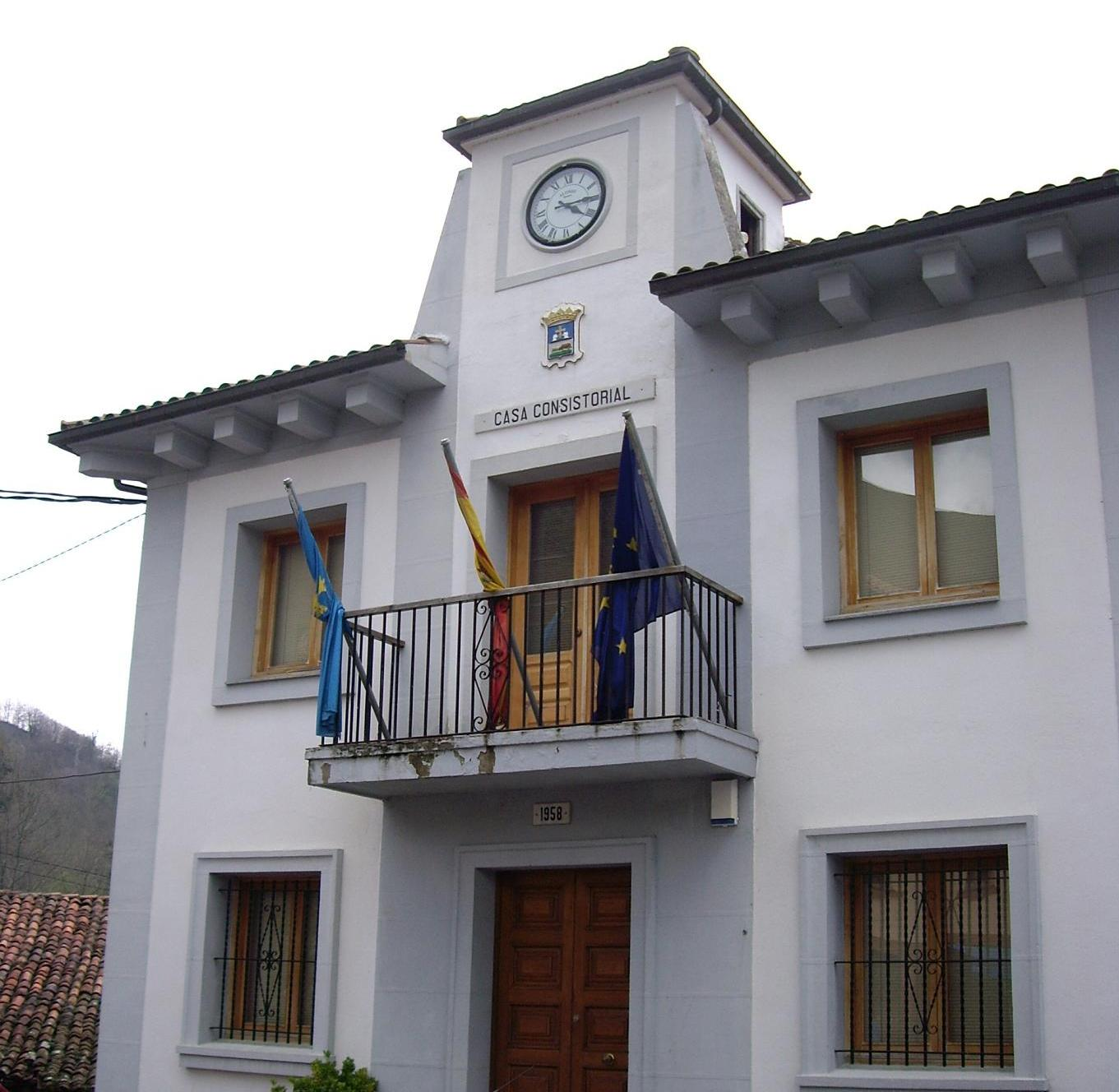
The ayuntamiento of Yernes y Tameza in Villabre

Villabre is a village in Asturias, in the north of Spain.
