= Caravia =

- Municipality
- Coat of arms

- Location in Spain
- Coordinates: 43°26′59.9″N 5°10′59.9″W
- Country: Spain
- Autonomous community: Asturias
- Province: Asturias
- Comarca: Oriente
- Judicial district: Villaviciosa
- Capital: Prado

Government
  - Alcalde: Pablo García Pando (PSOE)

Area
  - Total: 13.36 km^{2} (5.16 sq mi)
- Highest elevation: 631 m (2,070 ft)

Population (2025-01-01)
  - Total: 486
  - Density: 36.4/km^{2} (94.2/sq mi)
- Demonym: caraviense
- Time zone: UTC+1 (CET)
  - Summer (DST): UTC+2 (CEST)
- Postal code: 33344
- Website: Official website

Caravia is a municipality in the Autonomous Community of the Principality of Asturias, Spain. It is bordered on the north by the Bay of Biscay, part of the Cantabrian Sea, on the south by Parres, on the east by Ribadesella and on the west by Colunga.

== Geography ==
Caravia is the third smallest municipality of Asturias. The population is centered mainly in Prado (Prau in Asturian), the municipal capital, Duesos and Duyos. It is 68 km from Oviedo, the capital of the principality.

There are mountain summits in the southern parts of Caravia, with Fito (631 m) being the highest. In the north there are three main beaches: Beciella, Arenal de Morís and Espasa. The beaches are separated by great cliffs along the coast. The rest of the municipality has little variation in orography. Its main watercourse is the Romeros river.

Together with the municipalities of Colunga, Piloña, Parres and Ribadesella, Caravia is part of the geographic area known as Sierra del Sueve.

== Parishes ==
- Caravia Alta
- Caravia Baja

== History ==
=== Paleolithic ===
The first humans in Caravia were during the Paleolithic period, during the time when humans began to use stone tools. From this time period, there are ruins known as "Les Vaques" and "La Pongueta", located near Duyos, where Paleolithic humans lived near a small river and rocky escarpment.

=== Recent Prehistory ===
There is a large dolmen-like tumulus (or burial mound) near Beciella beach, by the mouth of the Romeros river. Nearby, there is also the Necrópolis de la Tuerba, formed by three tumuluses located in the coastal plain.

=== Iron Age ===
The first excavations made in the Picu el Castru, were carried out August 22, 1917, by Aurelio del Llano. He found a prehistoric fortification in his first dig, located two kilometers from the sea at an altitude of 380 m. This fortification had a perimeter of 225 m.

From this castro-style fortification, both the sea and the mountains can be seen, making it an ideal location to oversee Caravia and Colunga. It is accessed by a meandering ramp which leads to the interior containing the foundations of rectangular huts, 4 by 3 m, separated one from another by 90 cm.

According to Aurelio de Llano in his book "The Book of Caravia", the fortification contained tools, domestic utensils, and feminine jewelry. There were fibulae made of bronze and iron, pendants and necklaces. One notable bronze fibula was decorated with an embossed pony. Aurelio de Llano determined that the fortification dates back to the Bronze Age (2500 BC to 900 BC). All the pieces coming from the excavation are currently in the Archaeological Museum of Asturias.

=== Roman Era ===
One important stele exists from the Roman era, known as the Stele of Duesos (La Estela de Duesos). It was discovered on the exterior of the Church of Duesos, carved in a quartzite block. The existence of these steles, frequently embedded in Christian churches during their construction, is due to the conversion to Christianity of places where pagan religions were formerly practiced.

The stele is a fragment without epigraph and it is decorated on all four sides. The decoration is divided in registers, and the head is undecorated. A recurring theme of the carving is curved radii similar to a swastika. It is similar to Roman steles, but maintains traditional indigenous features. Among the materials taken from the fortification, there are examples of decorations similar to the stele.

== Demography ==
By: Instituto Nacional de Estadística de España - grafics for Wikipedia

== Politics ==
	PSOE	PP	IU-BA	Andere	Total
2003	4	3	0	0	7
2007	4	3	0	0	7

== See also ==
- List of municipalities in Asturias
