= Bimenes =

- Municipality
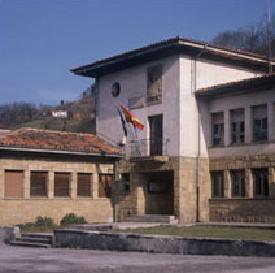
- The town hall

- Coat of arms

- Location in Spain
- Coordinates: 43°20′N 5°33′W
- Country: Spain
- Autonomous community: Asturias
- Province: Asturias
- Comarca: Oviedo

Government
  - Alcalde: José Emilio González Aller (Bloque Independiente de Bimenes)

Area
  - Total: 32.69 km^{2} (12.62 sq mi)
- Highest elevation: 1,144 m (3,753 ft)

Population (2025-01-01)
  - Total: 1,639
  - Density: 50.14/km^{2} (129.9/sq mi)
- Demonym: yerbatu/a
- Time zone: UTC+1 (CET)
  - Summer (DST): UTC+2 (CEST)
- Postal code: 33527
- Website: Official website

Bimenes is a municipality of Asturias, Spain. It borders with Siero, Nava, Laviana and San Martín del Rey Aurelio.

It is situated in the center zone of Asturias. Its capital is Martimporra. It is 32 km away from Oviedo and its main road is AS-25, that runs parallel to the Pra river.

The main towns of Bimenes are Martimporra, San Julian, Rozadas, Suares, Melendreros and Taballes.

Bimenes was famous of being a municipality full of miners, even though there were no mines in it, but the surrounding municipalities, Laviana and San Martin del Rey Aurelio did have many of them.

Its medium size surrounding mountains and steep roads are considered for sport events like Vuelta a España, Vuelta a Asturias, and the Rally Príncipe de Asturias.

== Politics ==
The current mayor is Aitor García Corte (Partíu Asturianista).

Local elections
Party/List	1979	1983	1987	1991	1995	1999	2003	2007	2011	2015
FSA-PSOE	2	3	4	3	3	3	1	1	0	4
CD / AP / PP	0	2	1	2	2	2	1	0	0	0
PCE / IU-BA / IU-The Greens	4	6	6	6	6	3	2	1	1	1
PAS / URAS-PAS					0	0	1	0	1	3
URAS / URAS-PAS						0		0	1	3
Xente Yerbato										1
BIB							3	7	7	
UCD / CDS	3	0	0							
PDNI						3				
BISODE							3			
Total	9	11	11	11	11	11	11	9	9	9

== Parishes ==
- San Emeterio (Bimenes)
- San Julián (Bimenes)
- Suares

== See also ==
- List of municipalities in Asturias
