= Muros de Nalón =

Muros de Nalón Muros (Asturian)
- Municipality
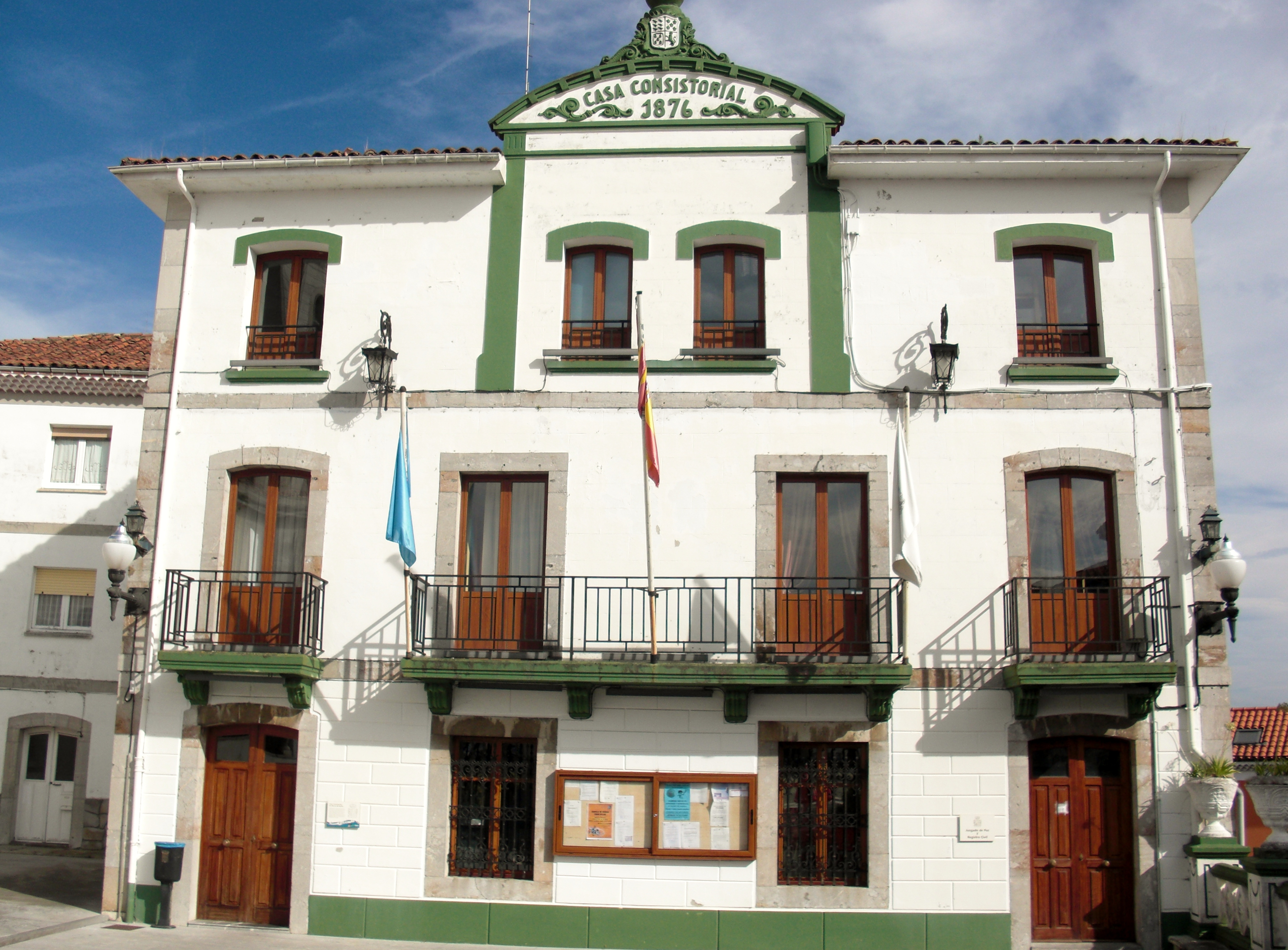
- Town Hall of Muros de Nalón

- Coat of arms

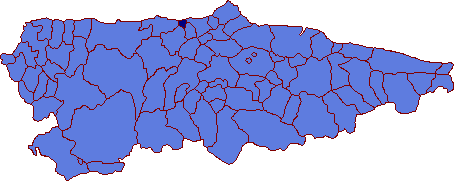

- Location in Spain
- Coordinates: 43°33′N 6°6′W
- Country: Spain
- Autonomous community: Asturias
- Province: Asturias
- Judicial district: Pravia
- Capital: Muros

Government
  - Alcalde: María del Carmen Arango Sánchez (PSOE)

Area
  - Total: 8.09 km^{2} (3.12 sq mi)
- Highest elevation: 131 m (430 ft)

Population (2025-01-01)
  - Total: 1,955
  - Density: 242/km^{2} (626/sq mi)
- Demonym: murense
- Time zone: UTC+1 (CET)
  - Summer (DST): UTC+2 (CEST)
- Postal code: 33138
- Website: Official website

Muros de Nalón (Asturian: Muros) is a small coastal municipality in the Spanish province of Asturias, with an area of 8.09 square kilometers. It is bounded to the north by the Bay of Biscay, to the east by the river Nalón, to the south by Pravia and the west by Cudillero. The eucalyptus tree is the town tree and occupies great parts of the slopes down to the coast.

There are two parishes (administrative divisions): Muros de Nalón (which is divided in five villages: Ea, Pumariega, Muros, Reborio and Villar) and San Esteban de Pravia.

Two important buildings in the municipality are the Palace of Valdecarzana and Vallehermoso and the Church of Santa María. It is possible to watch a panoramical view of the Asturian coast from the Mirador del Espíritu Santo.

== History ==
Before the 19th century Muros de Nalón's history were tied to the municipalities of Pravia, Cudillero and Soto del Barco. All these municipalities were integrated in one City Hall, so it is difficult to analyse Muros' individual history.

On 14 April 1847, Muros de Nalón was constituted as a Municipality separated of Pravia. At this time, it was known locally as 'Muros", ""Muros de Nalón"" or "Muros de Pravia' however on 27 June 1916 it adopted the office name of Muros de Nalón by a Royal Decree.

=== 19th century onwards ===
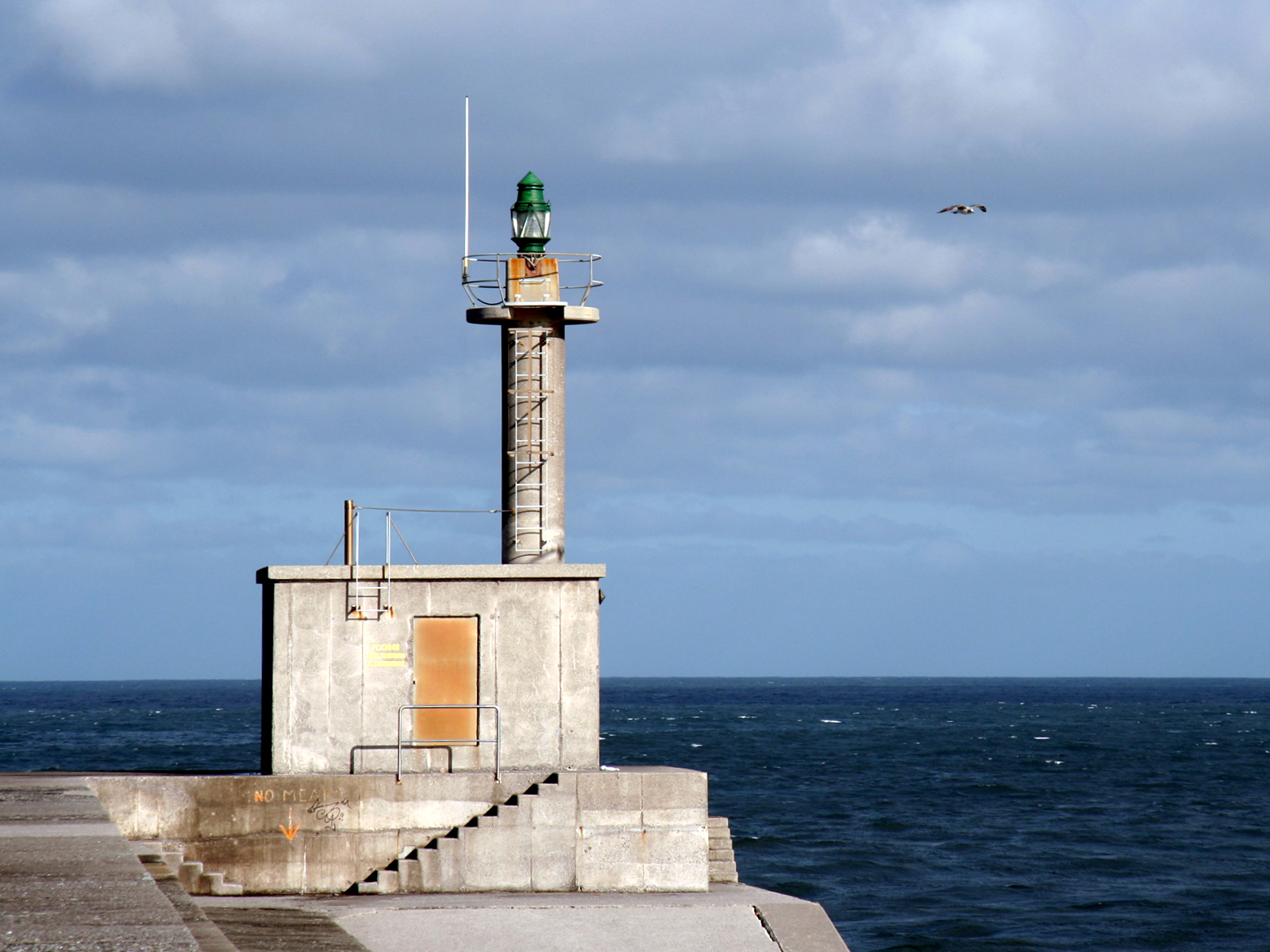
Lighthouse of San Esteban de Pravia, Muros de Nalón, Asturias

The 19th century brought major changes, and in the Peninsular War, French troops under the command of Marshal Michel Ney, sacked the town. It was in the 19th century when local Muros' people began litigation against the council House of Valdecarzana, being integrated in 1827 into the ordinary jurisdiction of the council of Pravia. Two decades later, in 1847 that Muros de Nalón was constituted as an independent municipality. Around this time the road from Muros to San Esteban de Pravia is established.

In 1916 the City acquired the new official name Muros de Nalón. In September 1934, prior to the outbreak of Spanish civil war, the ship Vapor Turquesa landed a large cargo of weapons that were supposed to be sent to Ethiopia. These weapons remaining permanently in Asturias caused numerous problems during the Civil War.

In Muros de Nalón, the Civil War broke a day later than other areas of Asturias. After the Spanish Civil War and the creation of Ensidesa in Avilés, the municipality experienced a great industrial development until the 1970s, when the crisis affected the Spanish industry.

== See also ==
- Geography of Spain
- List of Spanish cities
- List of municipalities in Asturias
