= Coya =

Coya may refer to:

- COYA - Acronym for Catholic Organizations for Youth in Asia
- COYA is also an acronym for the Choose Your Own Adventure book series
- Coya (Piloña), a parish in the municipality of Piloña, Asturias, Spain
- Coya District, a district of the province Calca in Peru
- Estero Coya, a river of Chile
- Coya Knutson (1912-1996), American politician from Minnesota
- Santa Cruz de Coya, a former city on the site of the fort of Santa Cruz de Oñez, Chile
- SS Coya, a 19th-century iron-hulled steamship on Lake Titicaca
- Qoya or coya, queen of the Inca Empire
  - Coya Asarpay (fl. 1533)
  - Coya Cusirimay (fl. 1493)
  - Mama Ocllo Coya (fl. 1493)
