= San Román =

San Román may refer to:

== Family ==
San Roman (Surname)

== Places ==
=== Belize ===
- San Román, Corozal
- San Román, Orange Walk
- San Román, Stann Creek

=== Peru ===
- San Román Province

=== Spain ===
Asturias

- San Román, a parish in the municipality of Amieva
- San Román, a parish in the municipality of Candamo
- San Román, a parish in the municipality of Piloña
- San Román, a parish in the municipality of Sariego

Castile-La Mancha

- San Román de los Montes, municipality in the province of Toledo
- San Román de Hornija, municipality in the province of Valladolid

Extremadura

- Peraleda de San Román, municipality in the province of Cáceres

La Rioja

- San Román de Cameros, municipality

=== Venezuela ===
- Cape San Román
