= Deportiva Piloñesa =

Piloñesa
- Full name: Deportiva Piloñesa
- Nickname: La Pilo
- Founded: 1917
- Ground: La Cueva, Infiesto, Piloña; Asturias, Spain
- Capacity: 600
- President: Juan Echevarría Cueli
- Head coach: Sergio Pérez
- League: Tercera Asturfútbol – Group 1
- 2025–26: Tercera Asturfútbol – Group 3, 6th of 16
| Home colours | Away colours |

Deportiva Piloñesa is a Spanish football club based in Infiesto, Piloña, in the autonomous community of Asturias.

== History ==
Founded in 1917, the club was consolidating in the village before promoting for the first time to Tercera División in 1980, playing 18 of the 22 next seasons in the league before declining and thus, being relegating to the lowest divisions due to bad performances. Piloñesa also participated in one edition of the Copa del Rey, being eliminated by Naval in the first round of the 1981–82 edition.

The last achievement of the club was the promotion to the sixth tier in 2018 against its rivals Europa Nava.

=== Club background ===
- Sporting Piloñesa (1917–1940)
- Asociación Deportiva Piloñesa (1940–1950)
- Deportiva Piloñesa (1950–)

== Season to season ==
| Season | Tier | Division | Place | Copa del Rey |
|---|---|---|---|---|
| 1929–1949 | — | Regional | — | |
| 1949–50 | 5 | 2ª Reg. | | |
| 1950–51 | 5 | 2ª Reg. | | |
| 1951–52 | 4 | 1ª Reg. | 12th | |
| 1952–53 | 5 | 2ª Reg. | | |
| 1953–54 | 4 | 1ª Reg. | 9th | |
| 1954–55 | 5 | 2ª Reg. | | |
| 1955–56 | 5 | 2ª Reg. | | |
| 1956–57 | 5 | 2ª Reg. | | |
| 1957–58 | 5 | 2ª Reg. | 1st | |
| 1958–59 | 4 | 1ª Reg. | 12th | |
| 1959–60 | 4 | 1ª Reg. | 11th | |
| 1960–61 | 4 | 1ª Reg. | 6th | |
| 1961–62 | 4 | 1ª Reg. | 6th | |
| 1962–63 | 4 | 1ª Reg. | 7th | |
| 1963–64 | 4 | 1ª Reg. | 12th | |
| 1964–65 | 4 | 1ª Reg. | 8th | |
| 1965–66 | 4 | 1ª Reg. | 14th | |
| 1966–67 | 4 | 1ª Reg. | 10th | |
| 1967–68 | 4 | 1ª Reg. | 14th | |

| Season | Tier | Division | Place | Copa del Rey |
|---|---|---|---|---|
| 1968–69 | 5 | 2ª Reg. | 8th | |
| 1969–70 | 5 | 2ª Reg. | 5th | |
| 1970–71 | 5 | 2ª Reg. | 7th | |
| 1971–72 | 5 | 2ª Reg. | 7th | |
| 1972–73 | 5 | 2ª Reg. | | |
| 1973–74 | 5 | 2ª Reg. P. | 19th | |
| 1974–75 | 6 | 2ª Reg. | 11th | |
| 1975–76 | 6 | 2ª Reg. | 5th | |
| 1976–77 | 6 | 2ª Reg. | 3rd | |
| 1977–78 | 7 | 2ª Reg. | 2nd | |
| 1978–79 | 6 | 1ª Reg. | 1st | |
| 1979–80 | 5 | Reg. Pref. | 3rd | |
| 1980–81 | 4 | 3ª | 4th | |
| 1981–82 | 4 | 3ª | 13th | First round |
| 1982–83 | 4 | 3ª | 18th | |
| 1983–84 | 4 | 3ª | 18th | |
| 1984–85 | 5 | Reg. Pref. | 5th | |
| 1985–86 | 5 | Reg. Pref. | 6th | |
| 1986–87 | 4 | 3ª | 15th | |
| 1987–88 | 4 | 3ª | 11th | |

| Season | Tier | Division | Place | Copa del Rey |
|---|---|---|---|---|
| 1988–89 | 4 | 3ª | 11th | |
| 1989–90 | 4 | 3ª | 12th | |
| 1990–91 | 4 | 3ª | 17th | |
| 1991–92 | 5 | Reg. Pref. | 1st | |
| 1992–93 | 4 | 3ª | 7th | |
| 1993–94 | 4 | 3ª | 7th | |
| 1994–95 | 4 | 3ª | 15th | |
| 1995–96 | 4 | 3ª | 18th | |
| 1996–97 | 5 | Reg. Pref. | 1st | |
| 1997–98 | 4 | 3ª | 13th | |
| 1998–99 | 4 | 3ª | 15th | |
| 1999–2000 | 4 | 3ª | 10th | |
| 2000–01 | 4 | 3ª | 16th | |
| 2001–02 | 4 | 3ª | 18th | |
| 2002–03 | 5 | Reg. Pref. | 15th | |
| 2003–04 | 6 | 1ª Reg. | 1st | |
| 2004–05 | 5 | Reg. Pref. | 16th | |
| 2005–06 | 5 | Reg. Pref. | 19th | |
| 2006–07 | 6 | 1ª Reg. | 6th | |
| 2007–08 | 6 | 1ª Reg. | 2nd | |

| Season | Tier | Division | Place | Copa del Rey |
|---|---|---|---|---|
| 2008–09 | 6 | 1ª Reg. | 1st | |
| 2009–10 | 5 | Reg. Pref. | 7th | |
| 2010–11 | 5 | Reg. Pref. | 17th | |
| 2011–12 | 5 | Reg. Pref. | 19th | |
| 2012–13 | 6 | 1ª Reg. | 10th | |
| 2013–14 | 6 | 1ª Reg. | 4th | |
| 2014–15 | 6 | 1ª Reg. | 4th | |
| 2015–16 | 6 | 1ª Reg. | 16th | |
| 2016–17 | 7 | 2ª Reg. | 3rd | |
| 2017–18 | 7 | 2ª Reg. | 2nd | |
| 2018–19 | 6 | 1ª Reg. | 6th | |
| 2019–20 | 6 | 1ª Reg. | 9th | |
| 2020–21 | 6 | 1ª Reg. | 3rd | |
| 2021–22 | 7 | 1ª Reg. | 10th | |
| 2022–23 | 8 | 3ª RFFPA | 7th | |
| 2023–24 | 8 | 3ª Astur. | 6th | |
| 2024–25 | 8 | 3ª Astur. | 9th | |
| 2025–26 | 8 | 3ª Astur. | | |

- 18 seasons in Tercera División
