= Samartín =

- Parish
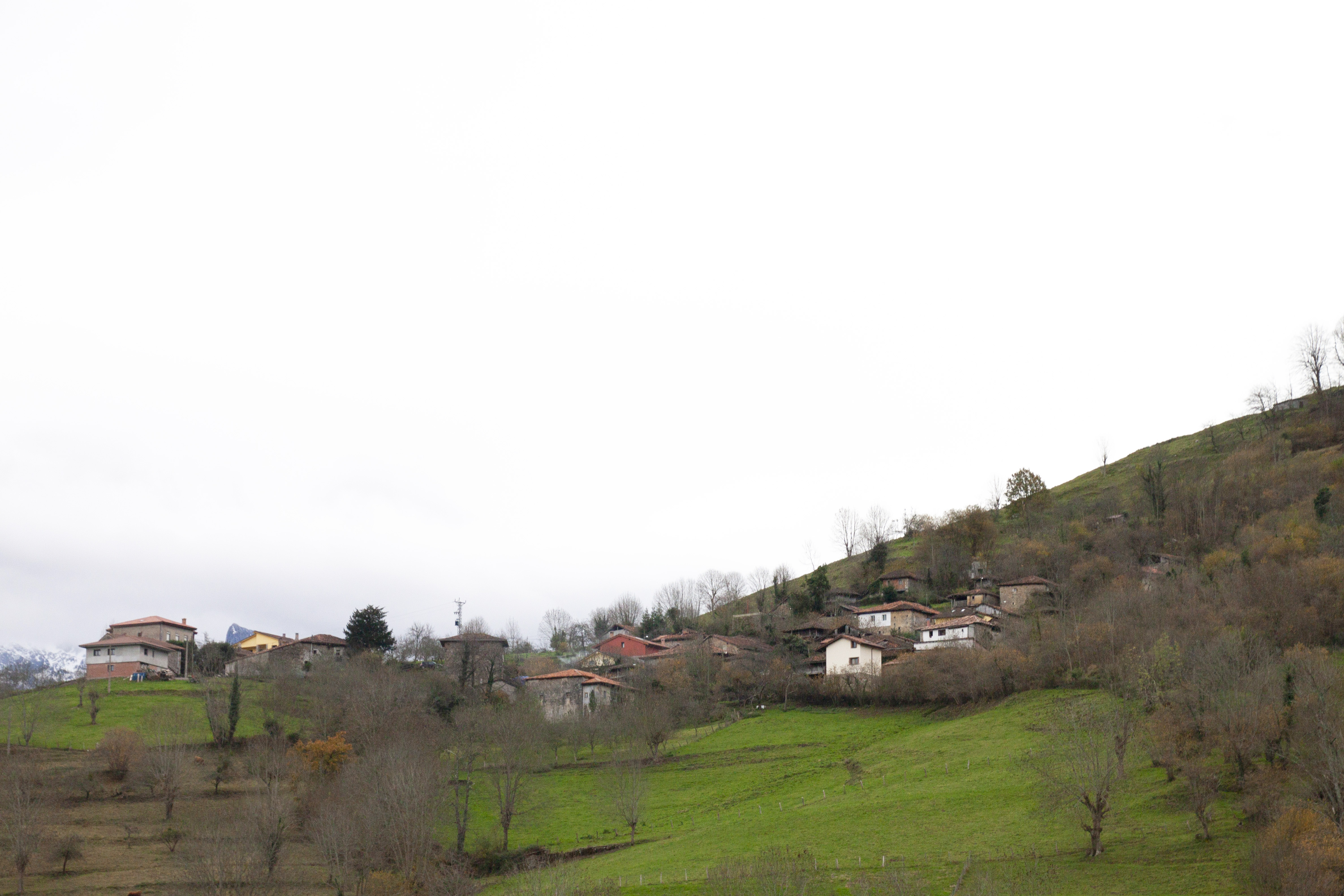

- Location within Spain
- Country: Spain
- Autonomous community: Asturias
- Province: Asturias
- Municipality: Amieva

Area
  - Total: 10.41 km^{2} (4.02 sq mi)

Population (2024)
  - Total: 142
  - Density: 13.6/km^{2} (35.3/sq mi)

Samartín is a parish in Amieva, a municipality within the province and autonomous community of Asturias, in northern Spain. It is located 8 km (5.0 mi) from Sames, the municipal capital.

The elevation is 340 m (1,120 ft) above sea level. It is 10.41 km^{2} (4.02 sq mi) in size. The population was 142 as of January 1, 2024. The postal code is 33558.

== Villages ==
- Argolibiu
- Campurriondi
- Los Caneyones
- Carmeneru
- Ceneya
- La Cetreda
- Cien
- La Ḥuente'l Sapu
- Gorguyones
- La Mata
- El Molín de la Llastra
- Palombierga
- El Puente Vega
- Rañes
- La Teyera
- La Vega
- Vega de Cien
