= Piloña (river) =

River in Asturias, Spain

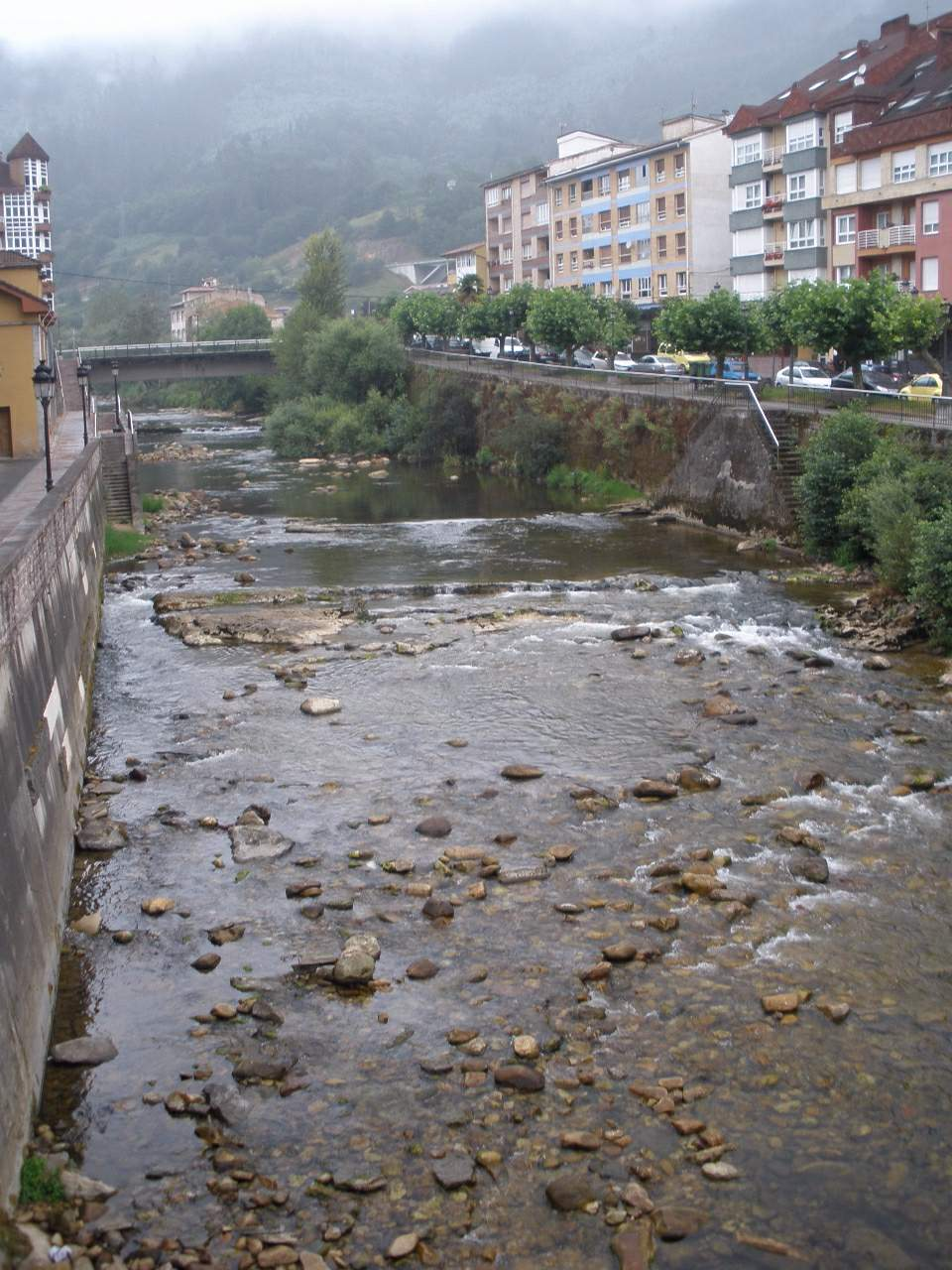

Location
- Country: Spain
- State: Asturias
- Region: Nava, Parres

Physical characteristics
- Source
  - location: Near Ceceda
  - coordinates: 43°21′22″N 5°27′13.15″W
  - elevation: 201 m (659 ft)
- Mouth
  - location: Sella River
  - coordinates: 43°23′20.3″N 5°11′4.2″W
  - elevation: 33 m (108 ft)
- Length: 40 km (25 mi)

The Piloña is a river in northern Spain flowing through the Autonomous Community of Asturias.

The river is formed by the confluence of the Rio Viao and the Rio Fuensanta near the town of Ceceda. It flows into the Rio Sella at the town of Arriondas. Tributaries to the Pilona include, Rio De la Marea, Rio Espinaredo, Rio Borines, Rio Color, Rio Cúa, and Rio Mampodre.

In the spring when the river is flowing high, it hosts two annual canoe events. The Descent of the Pilona between the Vieyu Bridge in Infiesto and the town of Sevares and the Pilona-Stella Descent from Soto de Duenas to Arriondas.
