= Santiago (Sariego) =

Santiago is one of three parishes in Sariego, a municipality within the province and autonomous community of Asturias, in northern Spain. The parish church is the Iglesia de Santiago el Mayor (Sariego).

It is 9.89 km^{2} (3.82 sq mi) in size, with a population of 694 (INE 2005).

== Villages and hamlets ==
- Berros
- La Carcavá
- La Cuesta
- Llamasanti
- Moral
- Ñora
- Pedrosa
- El Rebollal
- Santianes
- La Vega
