= Iglesia de San Cipriano (Infiesto) =

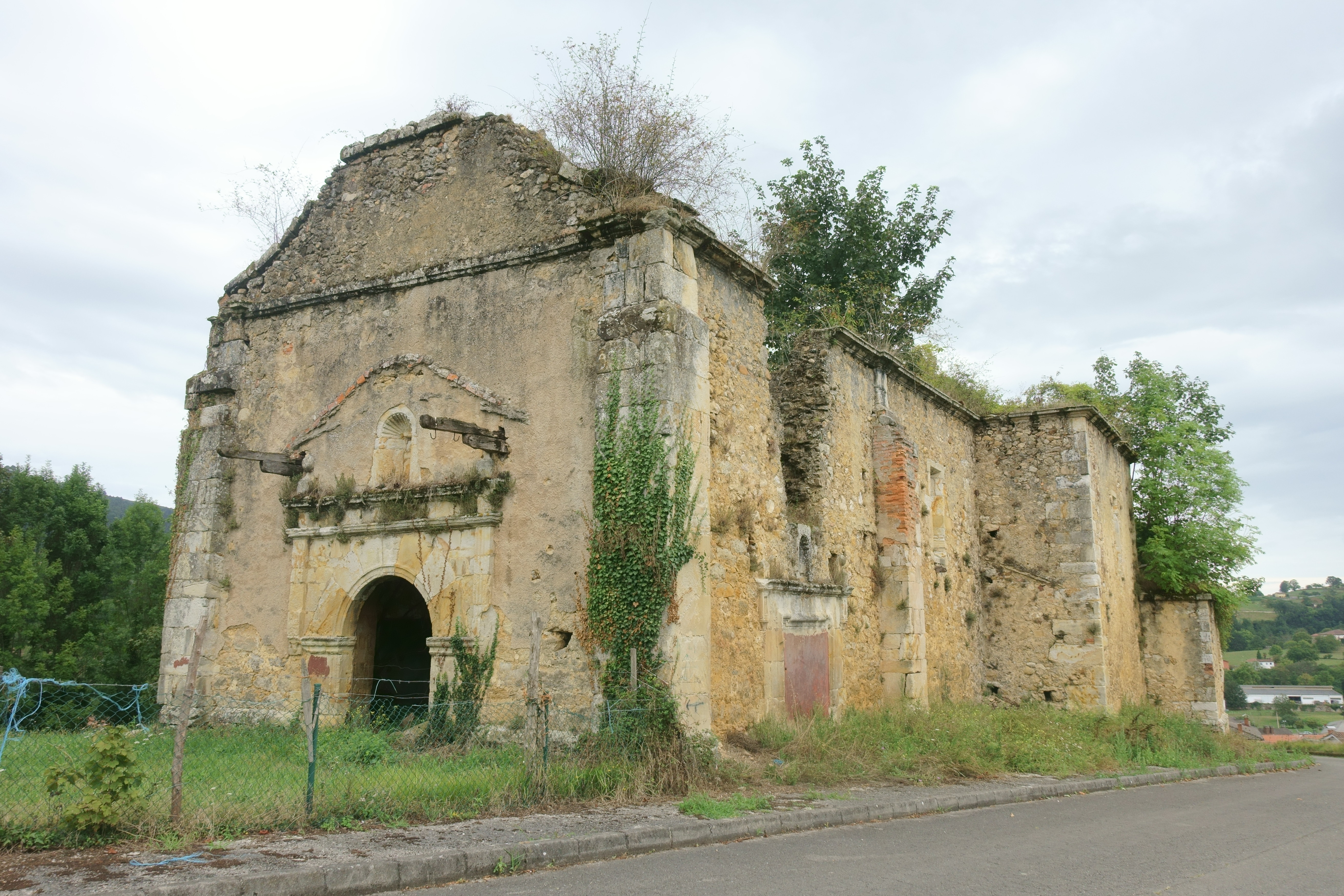
- Iglesia de San Cipriano, Infiesto
- Iglesia de San Cipriano (Infiesto)
- Location: Asturias, Spain

San Cipriano is a Roman Catholic church in the neighborhood of Infiesto, of the municipality of Piloña, in the autonomous community of Asturias, Spain. The church was established in the 17th century. It underwent significant reform in the 18th century. The interior was burned during the Spanish Civil War in 1936.

== See also ==
- Asturian architecture
- Catholic Church in Spain
- Churches in Asturias
- List of oldest church buildings
