= Sames =

Sames may refer to:

== People ==
Given name

- Sames I, Orontid king of Commagene and Sophene
- Sames II Theosebes Dikaios (died 109 BC), Orontid king of Commagene

Surname

- Albert Morris Sames (1873–1958), American judge
- Heinz Sames (1911–1944), German speed skater
- Ștefan Sameș (1951–2011), Romanian professional football player

== Places ==
- Sames, Pyrénées-Atlantiques, France
- Sames (Amieva), Asturias, Spain
