= Cereceda =

Cereceda may refer to:

== People ==
- Nelson Cereceda (born 1991), Chilean footballer
- Roberto Cereceda (born 1984), Chilean footballer
- Luis Cereceda, mathematician who formulated Cereceda's conjecture

== Places ==
- Cereceda de la Sierra, municipality in Salamanca, Spain
- Cereceda (Piloña), municipality in Asturias, Spain
