= Piloña =

- Municipality
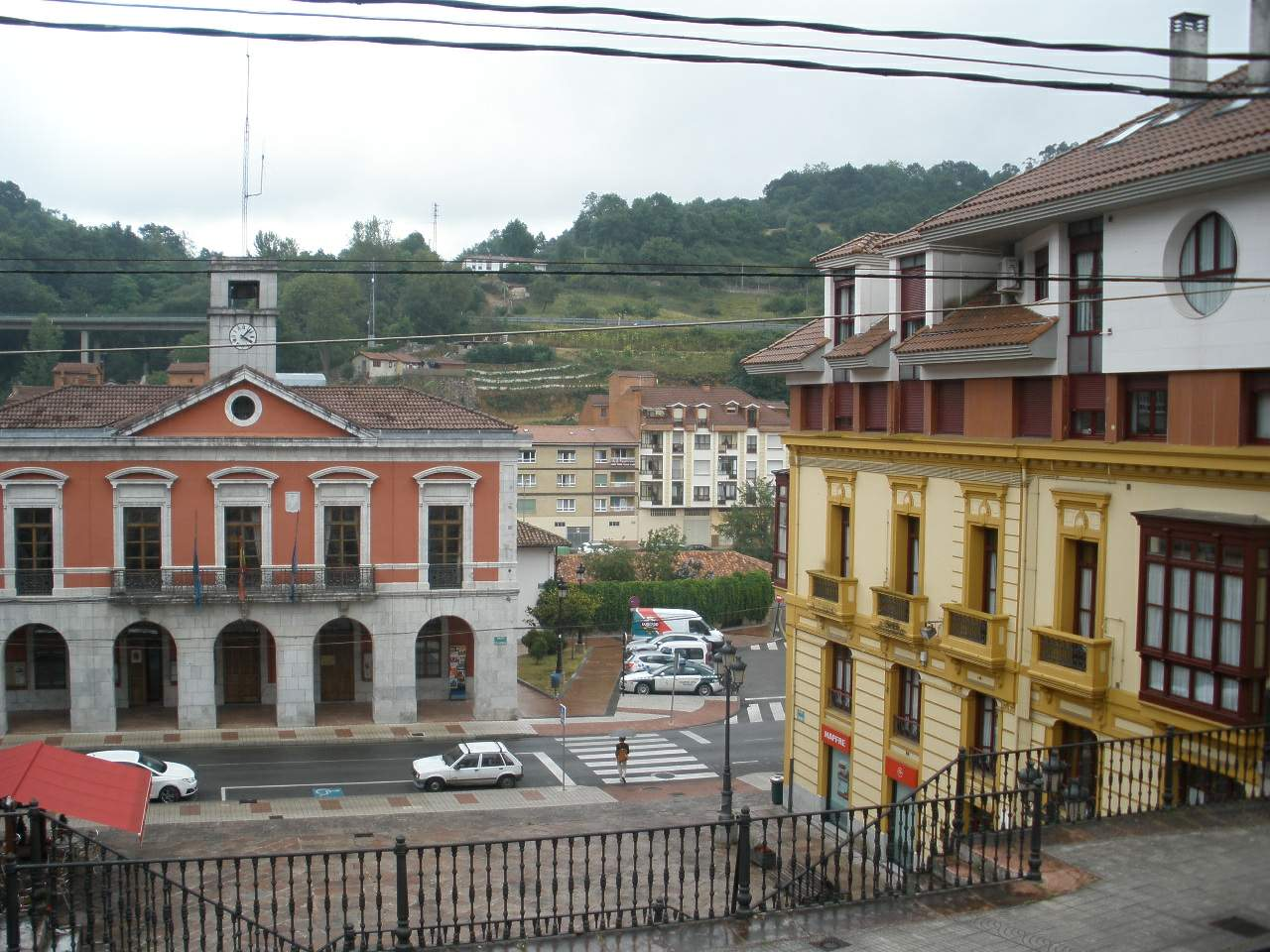

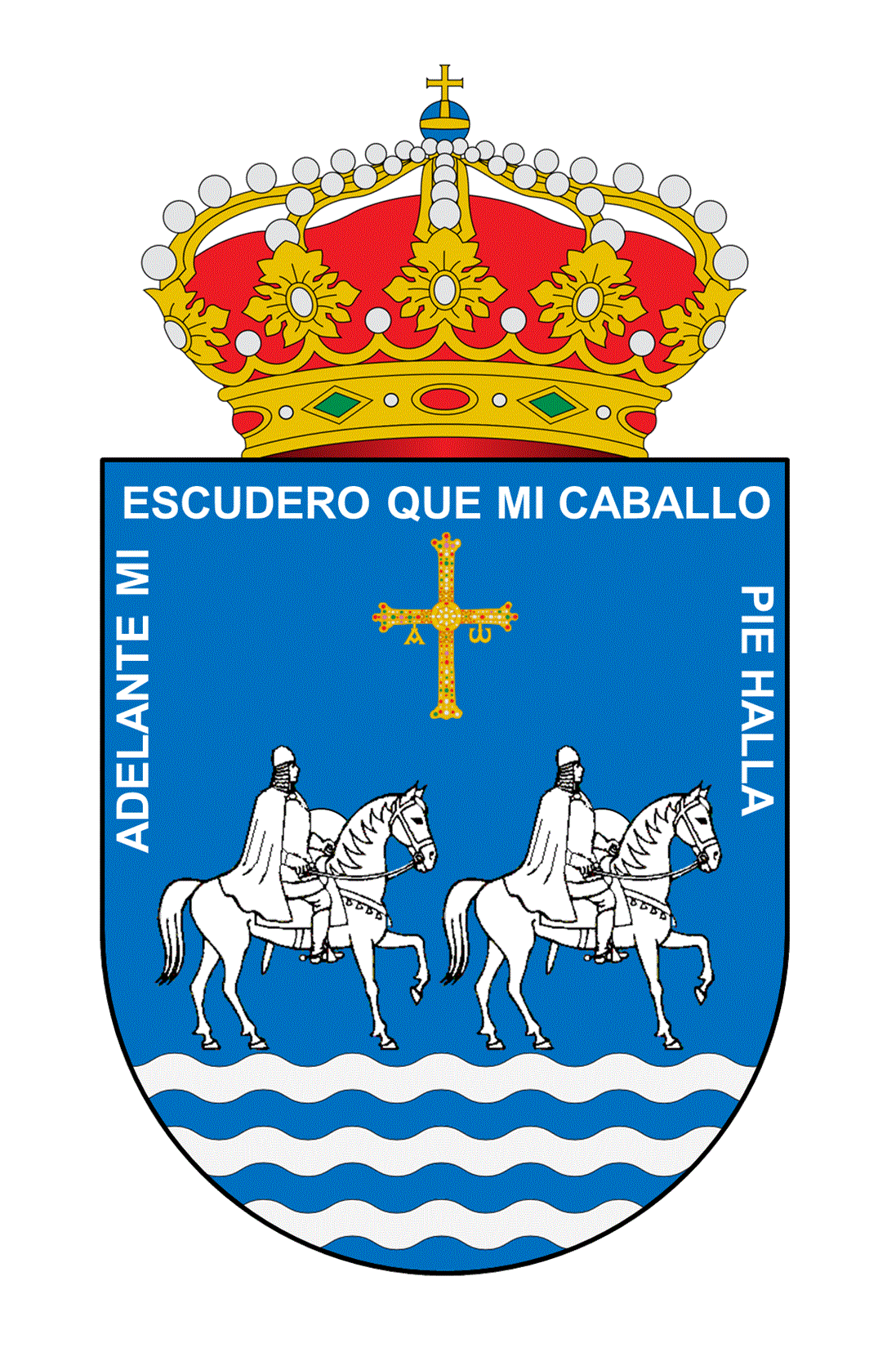
- Coat of arms

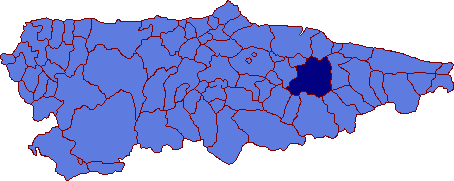

- Location in Spain
- Coordinates: 43°21′N 5°21′W
- Country: Spain
- Autonomous community: Asturias
- Province: Asturias
- Comarca: Oriente
- Judicial district: Piloña
- Capital: Infiesto

Government
  - Alcalde: Camilo Montes Díaz (PSOE)

Area
  - Total: 283.89 km^{2} (109.61 sq mi)
- Highest elevation: 1,420 m (4,660 ft)

Population (2025-01-01)
  - Total: 6,716
  - Density: 23.66/km^{2} (61.27/sq mi)
- Demonym: piloñeses
- Time zone: UTC+1 (CET)
  - Summer (DST): UTC+2 (CEST)
- Postal code: 33530
- Website: Official website

Piloña (Spanish pronunciation: [piˈloɲa]) is a municipality (district) in the province and autonomous community of Asturias, northwestern Spain. Its capital is the town of Infiesto. Piloña is bounded to the north by Villaviciosa and Colunga, to the east by Parres, to the west by Nava and Cabranes, and to the south by Ponga, Caso, Sobrescobio and Laviana. The area is semi-mountainous with many small, but deep and narrow valleys.

== History ==
In prehistoric times there were Paleolithic settlements in caves in Piloña such as Aviao (Espinaredo) Cave, Collaréu Cave, and La Peña Ferran (Ferran Rock) which were excavated by the Count de la Vega del Sella in the 1920s. There are several sites with Paleolithic rock art and Neanderthal remains, including Sidrón Cave in Borines.

Piloña lies in a narrow basin that runs parallel with the coast. Over time it formed part of the natural path between Oviedo and Cangas de Onís, which connects central Asturias with the Asturian east. Piloña was the largest settlement along that path.

In Roman times Beloncio was occupied, and is identified with the town Paelontium mentioned by Ptolemy as the capital of the Astur tribe known as Lugones. There is also evidence of Roman occupation at Borines.

== Economics ==
The area is poor and depopulating. There were over 20,000 inhabitants in 1930; 8,799 in 2001; and 8,440 in 2005.

The three largest towns are Infiesto (with about 20% of the population), Villamayor and Sevares. All three are on the Piloña River, a left-hand tributary of the Sella River, and on the main highway, the N-634.

The area is agricultural with cattle being raised for both milk and meat, and with some production of forest products.

== Parishes ==
There are 24 parishes (administrative divisions):

- Anayo
- Artedosa (L'Artedosa)
- Beloncio (Belonciu)
- Borines
- Cereceda (Cerecea)
- Coya
- Espinaredo (Espinaréu)
- Lodeña (Lludeña)
- La Marea
- Maza
- Miyares
- Los Montes
- Pintueles
- Ques
- San Antonio
- San Juan de Berbío (San Xuan de Berbío)
- San Román (San Román de Villa)
- Sellón
- Sevares (Sebares)
- Sorribas (Sorribes)
- Tozo (El Tozu)
- Valle
- Vallobal
- Villamayor

== Churches ==
- Iglesia de San Cipriano (Infiesto)

== See also ==
- List of municipalities in Asturias
