= Amieva =

- Municipality
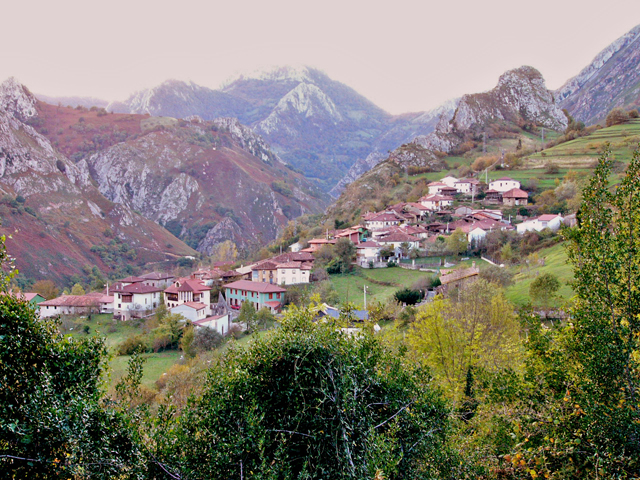
- View of Sames, the capital of this municipality.

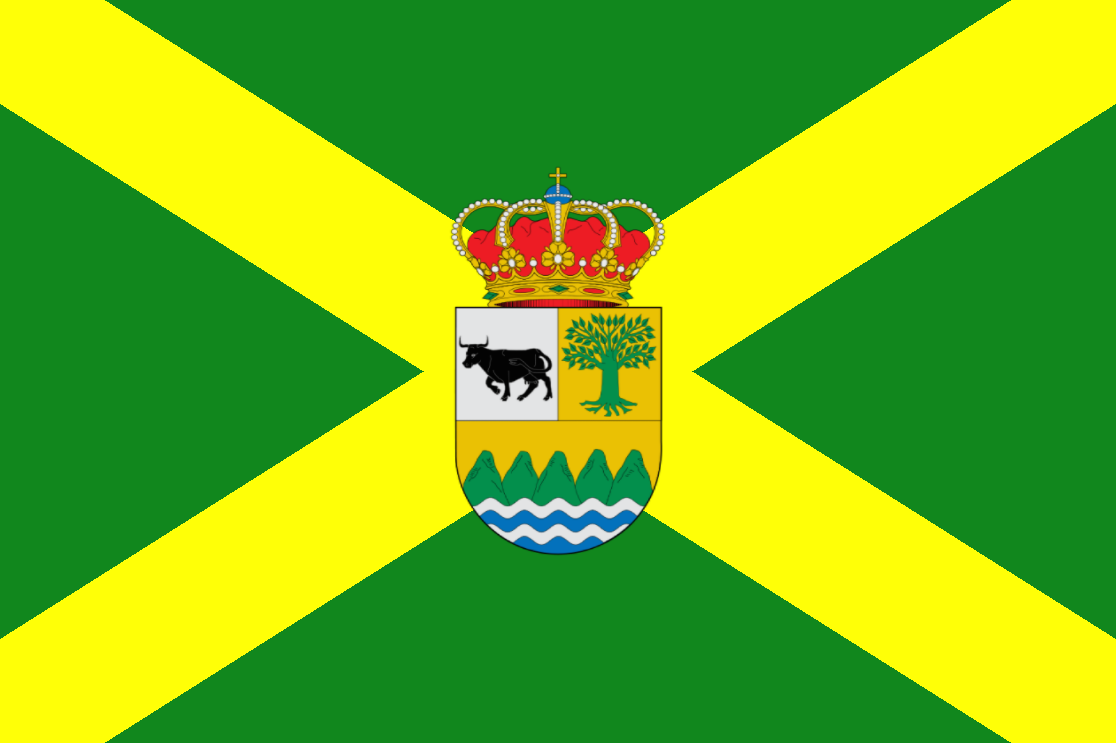
- Flag Coat of arms

- Location in Spain
- Coordinates: 43°14′N 5°4′W
- Country: Spain
- Autonomous community: Asturias
- Province: Asturias
- Comarca: Oriente
- Capital: Sames

Government
  - Alcalde: José Félix Fernández Fernández (Asturias Forum)

Area
  - Total: 113.90 km^{2} (43.98 sq mi)
- Highest elevation: 2,478 m (8,130 ft)

Population (2025-01-01)
  - Total: 591
  - Density: 5.19/km^{2} (13.4/sq mi)
- Demonym: amievense
- Time zone: UTC+1 (CET)
  - Summer (DST): UTC+2 (CEST)
- Postal code: 33556 a 33558

Amieva is a municipality in the autonomous community of Asturias, Spain. It is also the name of one of the municipality's subdivisions (parroquias, or parish).

Amieva municipality is sparsely inhabited, having a resident population of 868 (2005) and a population density of fewer than 8 people per square kilometre. The total area covers some 114 km^{2}.

== History ==
=== Coat of arms ===
==== Old arms ====
- Top: Emblem of Pelayo
- Bottom: Two emblems of important families of the City

==== New arms ====
Since 30 August 2001.

- Top left > Represents agriculture
- Top right > Represents the Forest economy
- Bottom > Represents the Rio Sella and the Picos de Europa, the most important natural features.

== Politics ==
Local elections
Party	1979	1983	1987	1991	1995	1999	2003	2007	2011	2015
FAC									3	4
PSOE	4	4	4	3	3	4	5	4	3	2
CD / AP / PP	2	3	4	3	4	1	2	3	1	1
PCE / IU-BA			0	1	0	0	0	0	0	0
PAS-UNA			0	2	2	1	0			
UCD / CDS	5	2	1	0						
URAS						1				
Total	11	9	9	9	9	7	7	7	7	7

== Parishes ==
Amieva is divided into 5 parishes:

- Amieva
- Samartín
- Mian
- San Román
- Sebarga

== Demography ==
Instituto Nacional de Estadística de España - grafics for Wikipedia

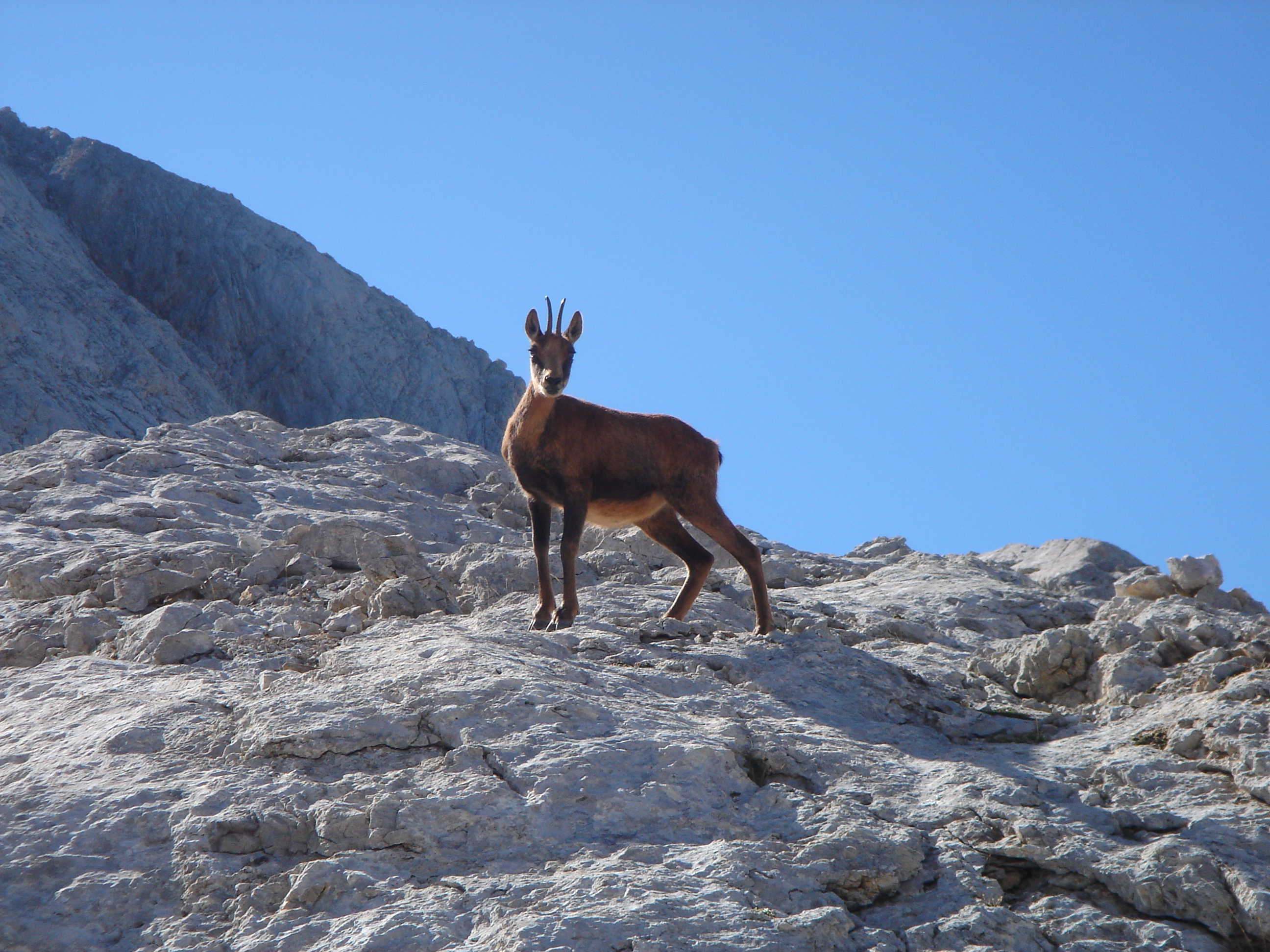
Rebeco in the Picos de Europa.

== See also ==
- List of municipalities in Asturias
