= Priandi =

- Parish
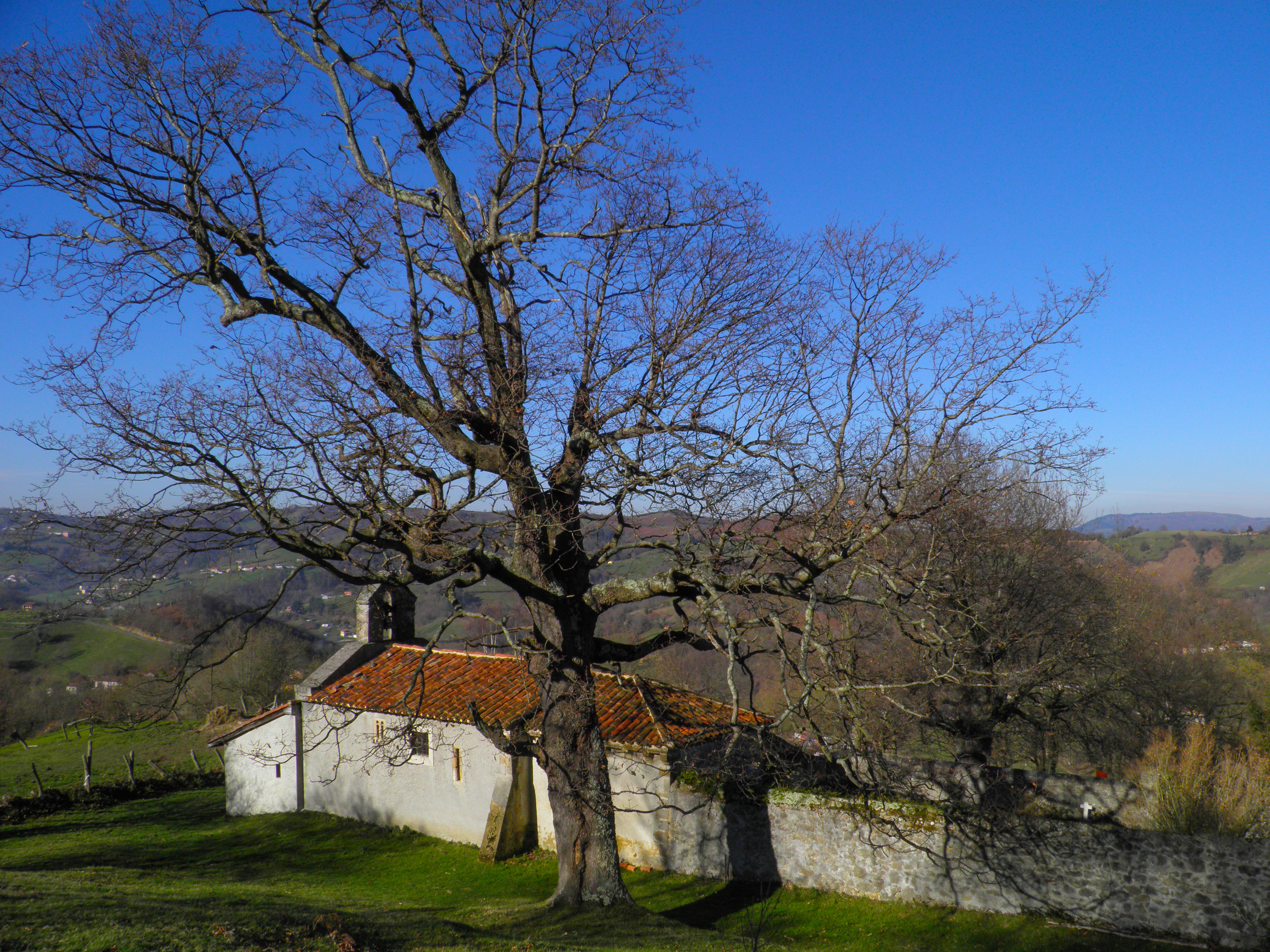

- Location within Asturias Location within Spain
- Coordinates: 43.35°N 5.516667°W
- Country: Spain
- Autonomous community: Asturias
- Province: Asturias
- Municipality: Nava

Area
  - Total: 10.95 km^{2} (4.23 sq mi)
- Postal Code: 33528

Priandi is one of six parishes in Nava, a municipality within the province and autonomous community of Asturias, in northern Spain. It is in the Archdiocese of Oviedo and contains the Iglesia de Santo Tomé (Priandi).
