= Miyares =

Coordinates: 43.377416°N 5.297966°W

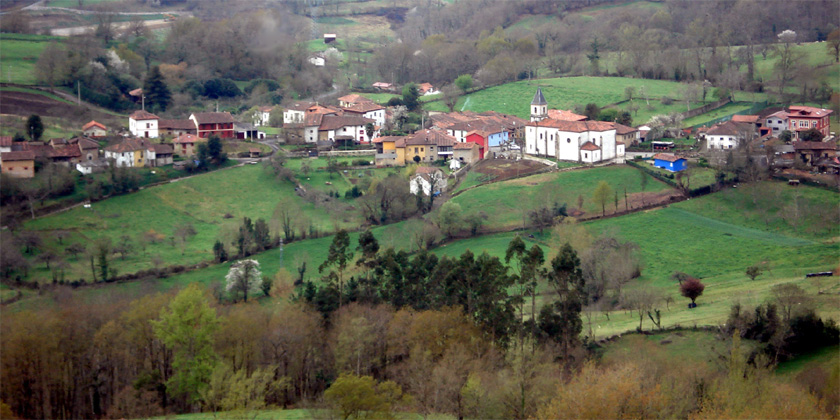
View of Miyares

Miyares is one of 24 parishes (administrative divisions) in Piloña, a municipality within the province and autonomous community of Asturias, in northern Spain, and also a village (lugar) within that parish. Miyares Parish includes three places: Miyares, La Goleta and Vallobal . In the place of Miyares are Cerezaleu neighborhoods, Oak Grove, Barbillosu, El Cantil, The Palace, mud, Fazona, El Pando and La Cabañina.

The population is 221 (INE 2007).

The parish is located on the southern slopes of the Sueve mountain range and is crossed by the Santianes stream and the Borines river, which are tributaries of the Piloña river.

== Villages and hamlets ==
According to the 2013 gazetteer, the parish comprises the following population entities:

Place name (traditional)	Historical category	Registered population (2012)	Dwellings (2001)	Altitude	Distance to the capital (m)
La Goleta	hamlet	70 inhabitants	42	140 m	8.1 km
Miyares	village (lugar)	114 inhabitants	90	173 m	7.6 km
El Cantil	farmhouse (casería)	8 inhabitants	2		7.0 km
El Corral	farmhouse (casería)	uninhabited	4		7.0 km
El Palacio (El Palaciu)	farmhouse (casería)	4 inhabitants	1	224 m	7.5 km
El Pando (El Pandu)	farmhouse (casería)	uninhabited	3	180 m	7.5 km

== Architecture ==
The parish church, built in the colonial style, is located in the village of Miyares and is dedicated to Saint Mary of the O.

The square tower of Omedal, of medieval origin but significantly modified throughout history, is a notable feature.

The buildings are a blend of traditional Asturian architecture and the architecture brought by the "Indianos" (Spaniards who emigrated to the Americas and returned wealthy). There are excellent examples of these "Indianos" mansions. In the village center, there is an interesting collection of traditional hórreos (raised granaries) and paneras (bread stores) in fairly good condition.

== Activities ==
The main activity is livestock farming, which has shaped a landscape of meadows interspersed with wooded areas. The cattle graze in the meadows during the winter and move up to Mount Sueve in the summer, where the Asturcón Festival is celebrated on the third Saturday of August.

Tourism is another important activity.
