= José Luis González Novalín =

Spanish priest (1929–2020)

José Luis González Novalín (6 January 1929 – 27 March 2020) was a Spanish priest and historian, rector of the Santa Maria in Monserrato degli Spagnoli in Rome between 1998 and 2010.

== Biography ==
González Novalín was born in Tresali, Asturias on 6 January 1929. He was ordained to the priesthood in 1952 and received his doctorate in Ecclesiastical History from the Pontifical Gregorian University in Rome.

From 1954 he taught at the Metropolitan Seminary of Oviedo. From 1954 he taught at the Metropolitan Seminary of Oviedo, and during 45 years. Between 1955 and 1958 he was chaplain of the Colegio Santa Teresa de Oviedo between 1955 and 1958; and between 1959 and 1965 of the Colegio Mayor Santa Catalina de Oviedo. Among other positions, he was also Canon Archivist of the Oviedo Cathedral in 1962, and ordinary professor of the Centro Superior de Estudios Teológicos at the Seminary in 1986).

In 1974 he moved to Rome when he was appointed vice-rector of the Santa Maria in Monserrato degli Spagnoli. In 1998 he was appointed its rector until his retirement in 2010, when he returned to his homeland and settled in Gijón.

As a historian, his studies on the Spanish Inquisition and the Spanish church during the Reformation were outstanding.

On 21 March 2020, he was admitted to the Central University Hospital of Asturias in Oviedo affected by COVID-19. He died from the infection on 27 March at the age of 91 during the pandemic.

== Books ==
His works include:

- El Inquisidor General Fernando de Valdés (1483-1568). I Su vida y su obra (1968)
- El Inquisidor General Fernando de Valdés. II Cartas y documentos (1970)
- Las visitas ad límina de los Obispos de Oviedo (1585-1901). Una fuente eclesiástica para la Historia de Asturias (1986)
- Bases e hitos para la historia eclesiástica de la diócesis de Oviedo (1995)

== Awards ==
- Prelate of Honour of His Holiness
- Commander of the Order of Isabella the Catholic
- Order of the Holy Sepulchre
