= Church of Santo Tomé =

Church of Santo Tomé may refer to:

- Iglesia de Santo Tomé (Toledo), a church in Toldedo, Spain
- Iglesia de Santo Tomé (Priandi), a church in Asturias, Spain
