= Church of San Román (Sariego) =

Medieval church in Asturias, Spain

Church of San Roman (Sariego)
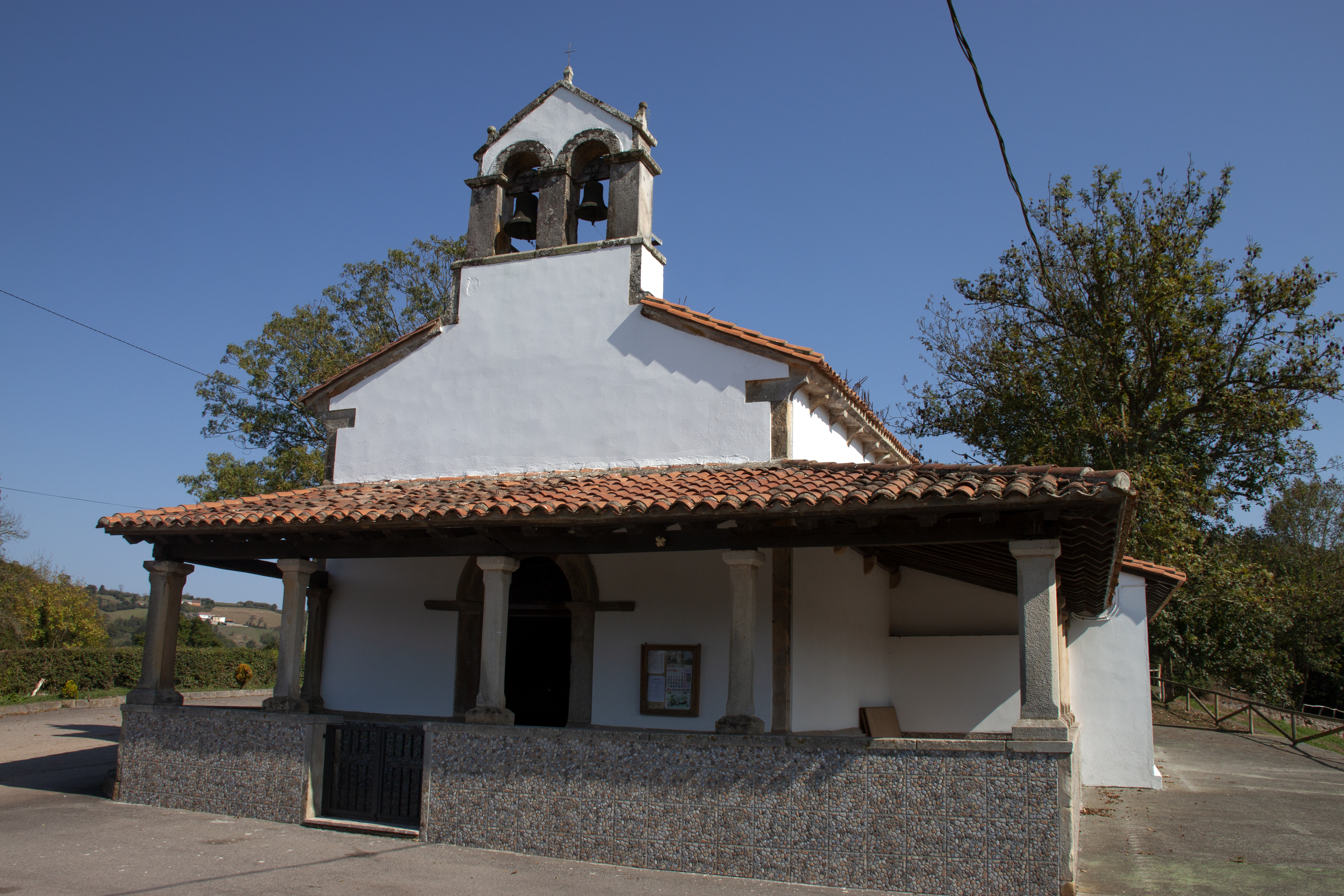
- Church of San Roman (Sariego)
- Location: Asturias, Spain
- Denomination: Roman Catholic

The Church of San Roman (Spanish: Iglesia de San Román) is a medieval church in Sariego, Asturias, Spain. San Román is one of three parishes in the municipality of Sariego.

The building is Romanesque in appearance but has older origins, as evidenced in the fenestration (a window is dated to the 10th century).

== See also ==
- Church of Santiago (Sariego)
