= Roman Bridge of Cangas de Onís =

Roman Bridge of Cangas de Onís Puente romano de Cangas de Onís
- Coordinates: 43.35018°N 5.13213°W
- Crosses: Sella River
- Locale: Cangas de Onís and Parres, Asturias, Spain
- Heritage status: Bien de Interés Cultural

Characteristics
- Design: Arch bridge

Location
- Interactive map of Roman Bridge of Cangas de Onís

The Roman Bridge of Cangas de Onís (Spanish: Puente romano de Cangas de Onís) is a bridge crossing the Sella River which flows through the town of Cangas de Onís, and it also passes through the municipalities of Cangas de Onís and Parres, roughly half on each side.

In 1931, it was declared a national monument. Thus, it is considered a bien de interés cultural.
