= Iglesia de Santa María (Mián) =

- Iglesia de Santa María (Mián)
- 43°15′52″N 5°07′25″W
- Location: Asturias, Spain

Iglesia de Santa María is a church in the parish of Mian, Asturias, Spain.
