= Lludeña =

Coordinates: 43.377392°N 5.37891°W

Lludeña (Spanish: Lodeña) one of 24 parishes (administrative divisions) in Piloña, a municipality within the province and autonomous community of Asturias, in northern Spain. As of 2024, LLudeña had a population of 39 individuals.

== Villages and hamlets ==
- Barbón
- El Palaciu
- Faidiellu
- La Llanacoya
- La Torre
- Lludeña
- Migoya
- Santa Llocaya
- Sopeña
- Valdeladuerna

=== Other populated places ===
- El Barréu
- El Corralón
- El Fontayu
- El Llombón
- El Pedrosu
- L'Ablanu
- L'Apiaderu
- L'Arquera
- La Casanueva
- La Escuela
- La Llantada
- La Pontiga
- La Tabierna
- La Vega
- La Venta
- Les Llaviaes
- Les Pedreses
- Los Campones
- San Antonio
