= Cider Museum =

Museum in Nava, Asturias, Spain

Coordinates: 43°21′30″N 5°30′13″W

Cider Museum (Museo de la Sidra)
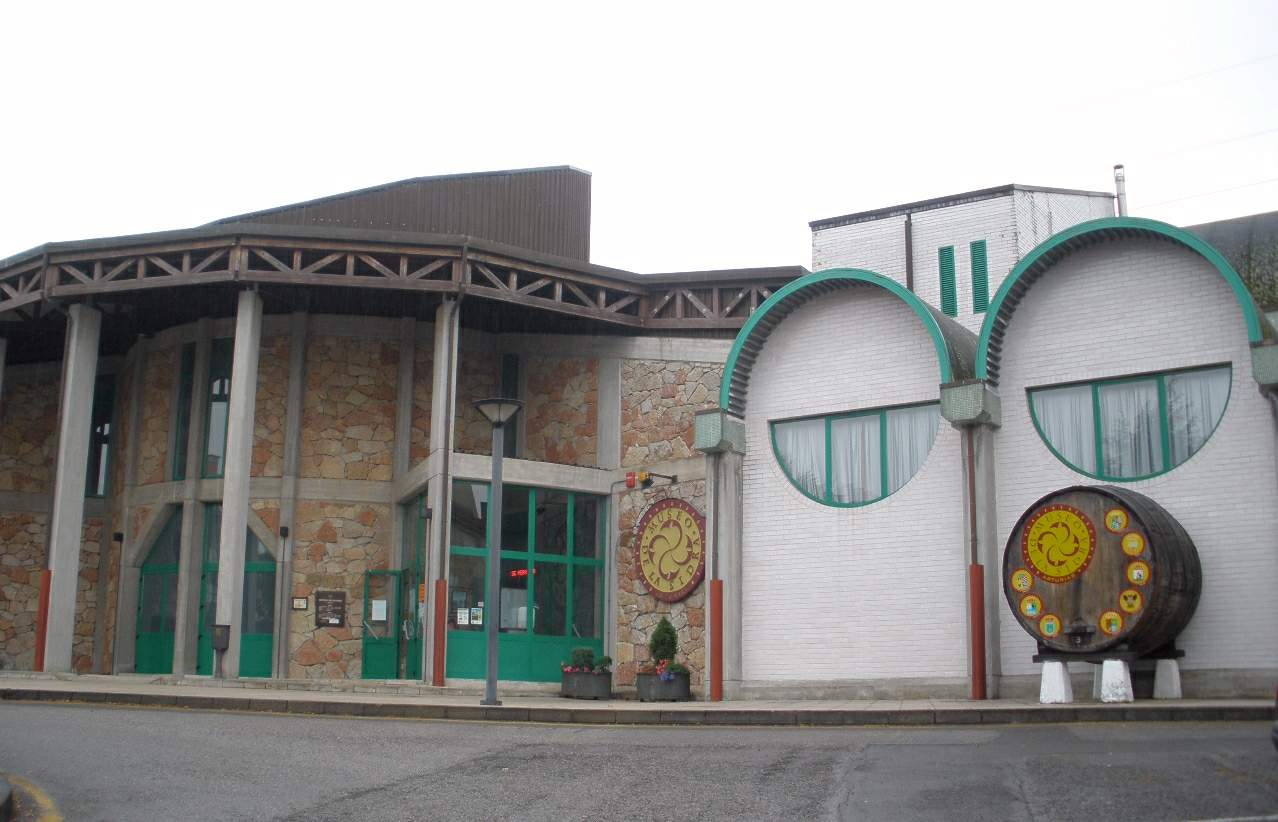
- Established: 1996
- Location: Plaza del Príncipe de Asturias; Nava, Asturias, Spain
- Website: http://www.museodelasidra.com/index2.htm

The Cider Museum (Spanish: Museo de la Sidra) is located in the Plaza del Príncipe de Asturias in Nava, Asturias, Spain. Opened in 1996 by Prince Philip, it is a themed museum that showcases Asturian national drink, cider. The museum is a member of the Ethnographic Museums Network of Asturias.

Interactive exhibits cover the entire process of cider creation, from growing apples, through pressing, fermenting, bottling, to consumption of this alcoholic beverage. There is an area devoted to sparkling cider. The museum also focuses on issues such as pollination and the development of apple trees.

Summer and winter hours vary.

== See also ==
- List of food and beverage museums
