= Espinaréu =

Parish in Piloña, Asturias, Spain

Coordinates: 43.301336°N 5.363305°W

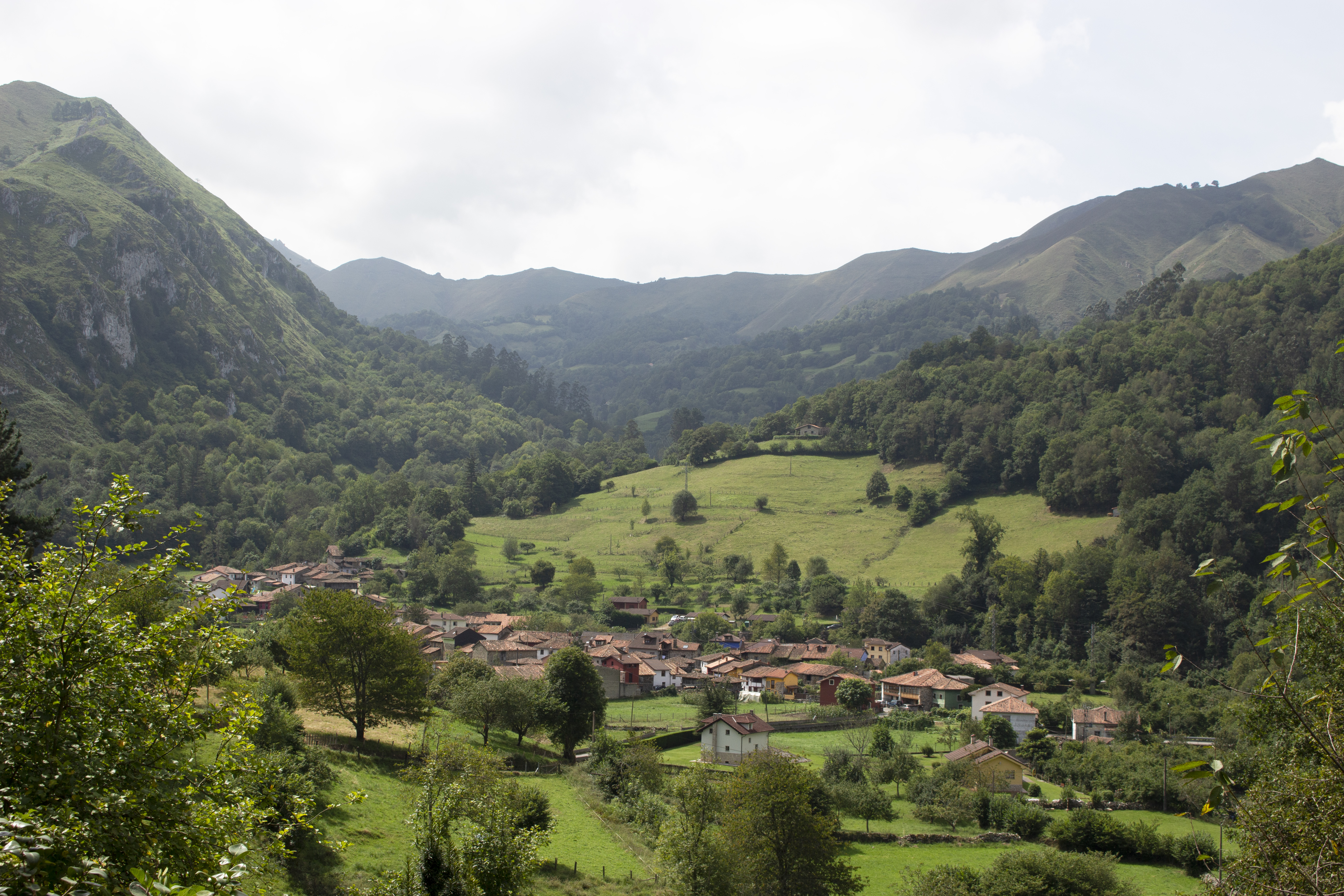
Espinaréu

Espinaréu is one of 24 parishes (administrative divisions) in Piloña, a municipality within the province and autonomous community of Asturias, in northern Spain.

The population is 164 (INE 2011).

== Villages and hamlets ==
- El Barru
- El Campón
- El Pedrosu
- El Tabayón
- Ferrán
- La Villa
- Les Cuerries
- Pandelamazca
- Porciles
- Raicéu
- Rifabar
- Riquimáu
- Sobanéu
- Sotu
- Xerra

=== Other populated places ===
- Aviaos
- Brañanueva
- Caminos
- El Cantiellu
- El Cargüezu
- El Corralón
- El Cándanu
- El Llugar de Riba
- El Regón
- El Resquebráu
- El Robléu
- Fuentenueva
- Guzadales
- L'Escobal d'Alantre
- L'Escobal de Tras
- La Carcaviella
- La Casa Baxu
- La Cruz
- La Cruz de los
- La Escosura
- La Fragua
- La Frecha
- La Llamera
- La Llaviada
- La Olla
- La Peña
- La Puente
- La Vega la Fuente
- La Viesca
- Miera
- San Feliz
- San Tiso
- Solasenda
- Solavega
- Villar
