= Amieva (parish) =

Parish in Spain

- Parish
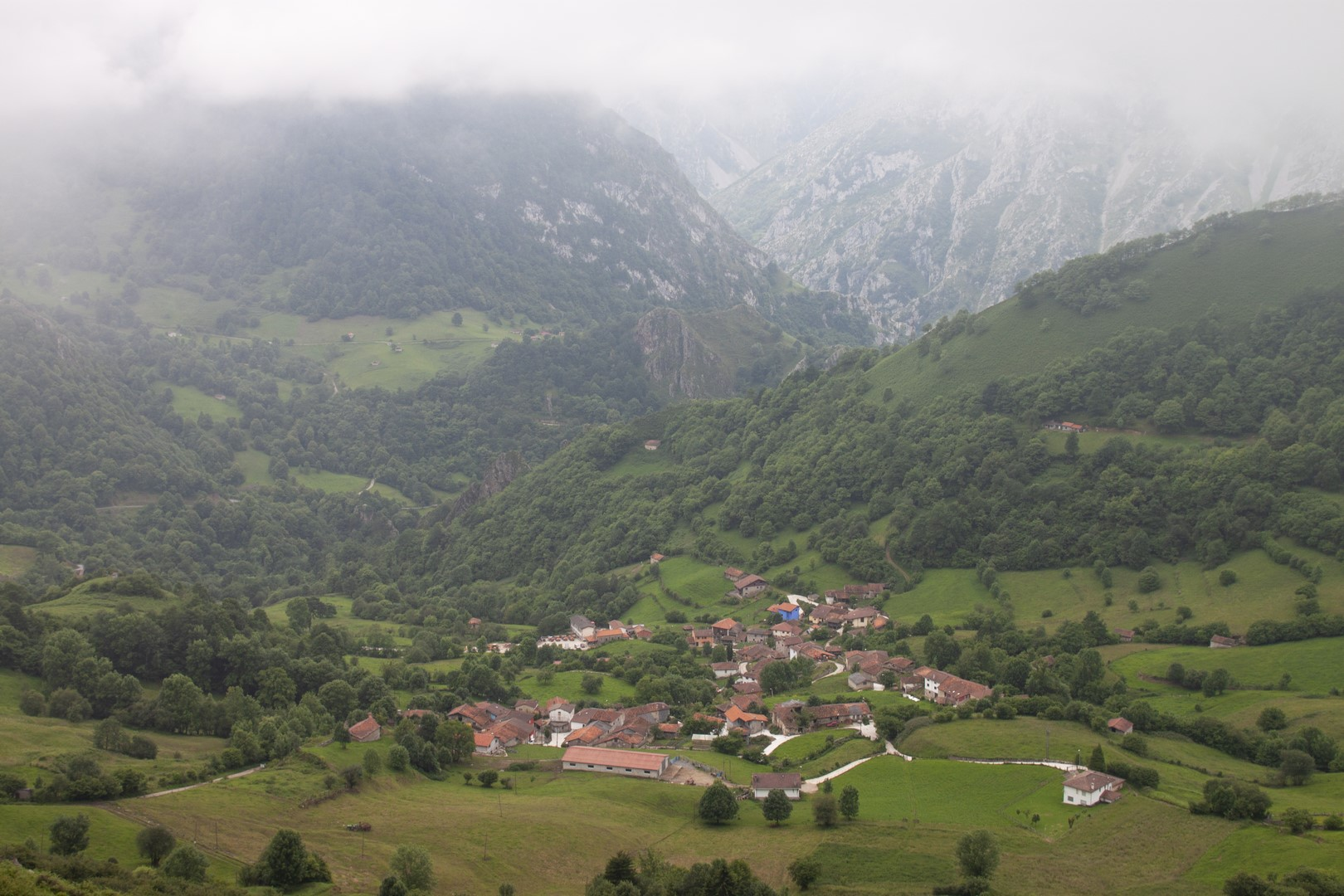

- Location within Spain
- Country: Spain
- Autonomous community: Asturias
- Province: Asturias
- Municipality: Amieva

Area
  - Total: 50.21 km^{2} (19.39 sq mi)

Population (2024)
  - Total: 64
  - Density: 1.3/km^{2} (3.3/sq mi)
- Postal code: 33558

Amieva is a village and a parish in the autonomous community of Asturias, in northern Spain. It gives its name to the municipality of Amieva in which it is situated.

It is 50.21 km^{2} (19.39 sq mi) in size. The population was 64 as of January 1, 2024.

The postal code is 33558.

== The Iglesia de San Pedro de Vega ==
The Iglesia de San Pedro de Vega stands in the village, a rectangular church with a single nave. The western facade has the main entrance, formed by a semicircular arch, with a voluminous steeple of blocks with two apertures for bells. Four winged angels are found at the four exterior corners of the church. The interior is modernized but retains the original work.
