= La Marea =

Coordinates: 43.274009°N 5.421415°W

La Marea is one of 24 parishes (administrative divisions) in Piloña, a municipality within the province and autonomous community of Asturias, in northern Spain.

The population is 55 people. (INE 2011).

== Villages and hamlets ==
- El Fresnedal
- La Marea
- La Comba
- Los Cuetos
- Les Cueves
- Miera
- El Retornu

=== Other populated places ===
- Carcovaseca
- Casa Pura
- El Crespu
- El Faéu
- El Pical
- El Portalón
- El Tornu
- El Trompicu
- El Valluecu
- L'Ablanosa
- L'Argayu
- La Casellina
- La Llera
- La Llonganiza
- La Marea de Riba
- La Noval
- La Pría
- La Vallinona
- La Veguina
- La Viña
- Les Mueles
- Los Andrinales
- Los Miyares
- Los Pandos
- Los Torales
- Maraña
- Pandumolín
