= Sariego =

Sariego Sariegu (Asturian)
- Municipality
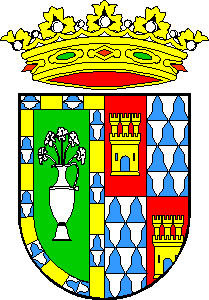
- Flag Coat of arms

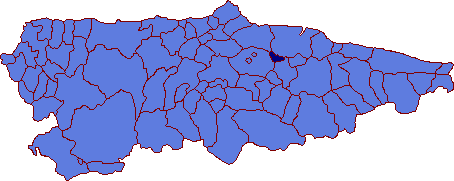

- Location in Spain
- Coordinates: 43°25′N 5°34′W
- Country: Spain
- Autonomous community: Asturias
- Province: Asturias
- Comarca: Oviedo
- Judicial district: Siero
- Capital: Vega

Government
  - Alcalde: Javier Parajón (PROMUSA)

Area
  - Total: 25.73 km^{2} (9.93 sq mi)
- Highest elevation: 731 m (2,398 ft)

Population (2025-01-01)
  - Total: 1,252
  - Density: 48.66/km^{2} (126.0/sq mi)
- Demonym: saregano/a
- Time zone: UTC+1 (CET)
  - Summer (DST): UTC+2 (CEST)
- Postal code: 33518

Sariego (Asturian: Sariegu) is a municipality in the Autonomous Community of the Principality of Asturias, Spain. It is bordered on the north by Gijón and Villaviciosa, on the east by Villaviciosa, Nava and Cabranes, on the south by Siero and Nava, and on the west by Siero. The source of the Nora River is within the municipality.

The principal holidays are that of Santiago (the weekend before July 25) and San Pedrín de la Cueva (the third Sunday in August).

The principal monuments of Sariego are the churches of Santiago el Mayor, San Román, and Santa María de Narzana, all of which are constructed in a Romanesque style. The Palacio de los Vigil Quiñones, erected in the 16th century, is also notable.

== Toponymy ==
The decree 116/2005 of November 17, 2005, published in the December 2 Boletin Oficial del Principado de Asturias (BOPA; official bulletin of the Principality of Asturias) granted the Asturian forms of the municipal place names official status for all uses, except for Lamasanti/Llamasanti, which maintains its bilingual name. Therefore, with this exception, the Asturian names are the only ones which can appear on road signs and official maps.

== Parishes ==
- Narzana
- San Román
- Santiago

== See also ==
- Church of Santiago de Sariego
- List of municipalities in Asturias
