= Narzana =

Parish in Sariego, Asturias, Spain

Coordinates: 43°24′53″N 5°34′48″W

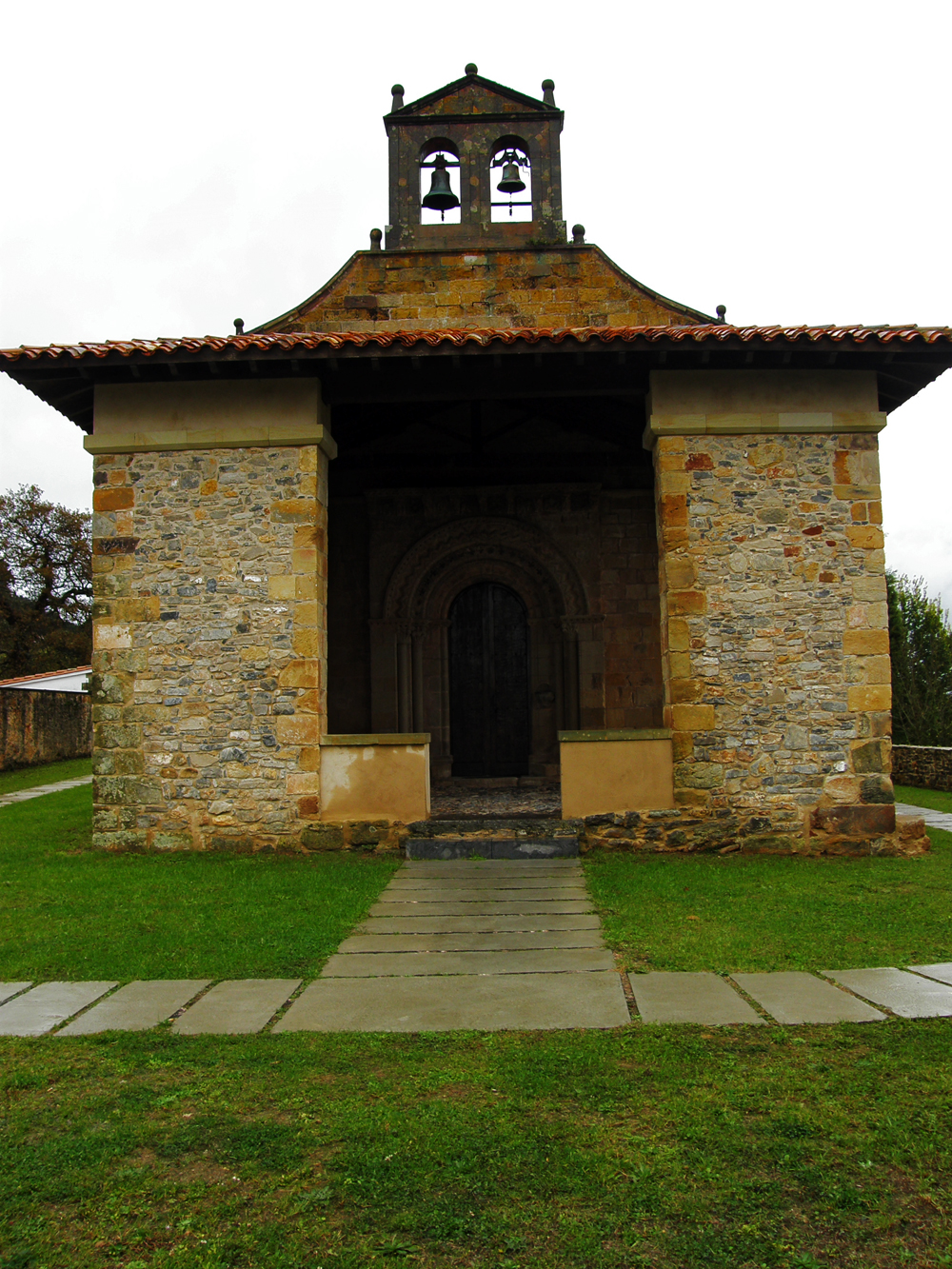
Romanesque Church of Santa María de Narzana, in Sariego (Asturias, Spain)

Narzana is one of three parishes in Sariego, a municipality within the province and autonomous community of Asturias, in northern Spain.

It is 2.11 km^{2} (0.81 sq mi) in size, with a population of 838.

The principal monument is the Church of Santa María de Narzana, constructed in a Romanesque style.

== Villages ==
- Aramanti
- Barbechu
- Canal
- Castañera
- Miares
- La Rimá
- Villar
