= Borines =

Coordinates: 43.393325°N 5.322655°W

Borines is one of 24 parishes (administrative divisions) in Piloña, a municipality within the province and autonomous community of Asturias, in northern Spain.

The population is 196 (INE 2015).

== Villages and hamlets ==
- Borines
- La Infiesta
- Moñio
- Sieres
- Viyao
- Castañoso
- El Escobal
- La Llama
- El Mortorio
- San Feliz
- San Martin de Borines
