= Cuenya =

- Parish
- Location within Spain
- Coordinates: 43.383333°N 5.483333°W
- Country: Spain
- Autonomous community: Asturias
- Province: Asturias
- Municipality: Nava

Cuenya is one of six parishes (administrative divisions) in Nava, a municipality within the province and autonomous community of Asturias, in northern Spain. It has an area of 11.36 square kilometers and in the 2001 census 193 houses were counted.
