= Ques =

Coordinates: 43.35°N 5.383333°W

Ques is one of 24 parishes (administrative divisions) in Piloña, a municipality within the province and autonomous community of Asturias, in northern Spain.

The population is 159 (INE 2006).

== Villages and hamlets ==
- Bierces
- El Pedruecu
- La Cueva
- La Llana
- La Parte
- La Rebollada
- La Rozuca
- Vistalegre

=== Other populated places ===
- Ampuerios
- Cantora
- El Cadaveru
- El Canalón
- El Cauxiellu
- El Cotariellu
- El Foyu
- El Palaciu
- El Pimientu
- El Regueru
- El Somoniellu
- Espina
- L'Oteru
- La Casona
- La Cortina
- Les Quintes
- Sofelguera
