= Sorribes (Piloña) =

Coordinates: 43.368097°N 5.257257°W

Sorribes is one of 24 parishes (administrative divisions) in Piloña, a municipality within the province and autonomous community of Asturias, in northern Spain.

The population is 130 (INE 2011).

== Villages and hamlets ==
- Ardavín
- Brez
- Cúa
- El Cotal
- El Robledal
- La Espilonga
- La Ferrera
- Los Riegos
- Sabilde
- Solapeña
- Sorribes
