= Belonciu =

Coordinates: 43.329863°N 5.391692°W

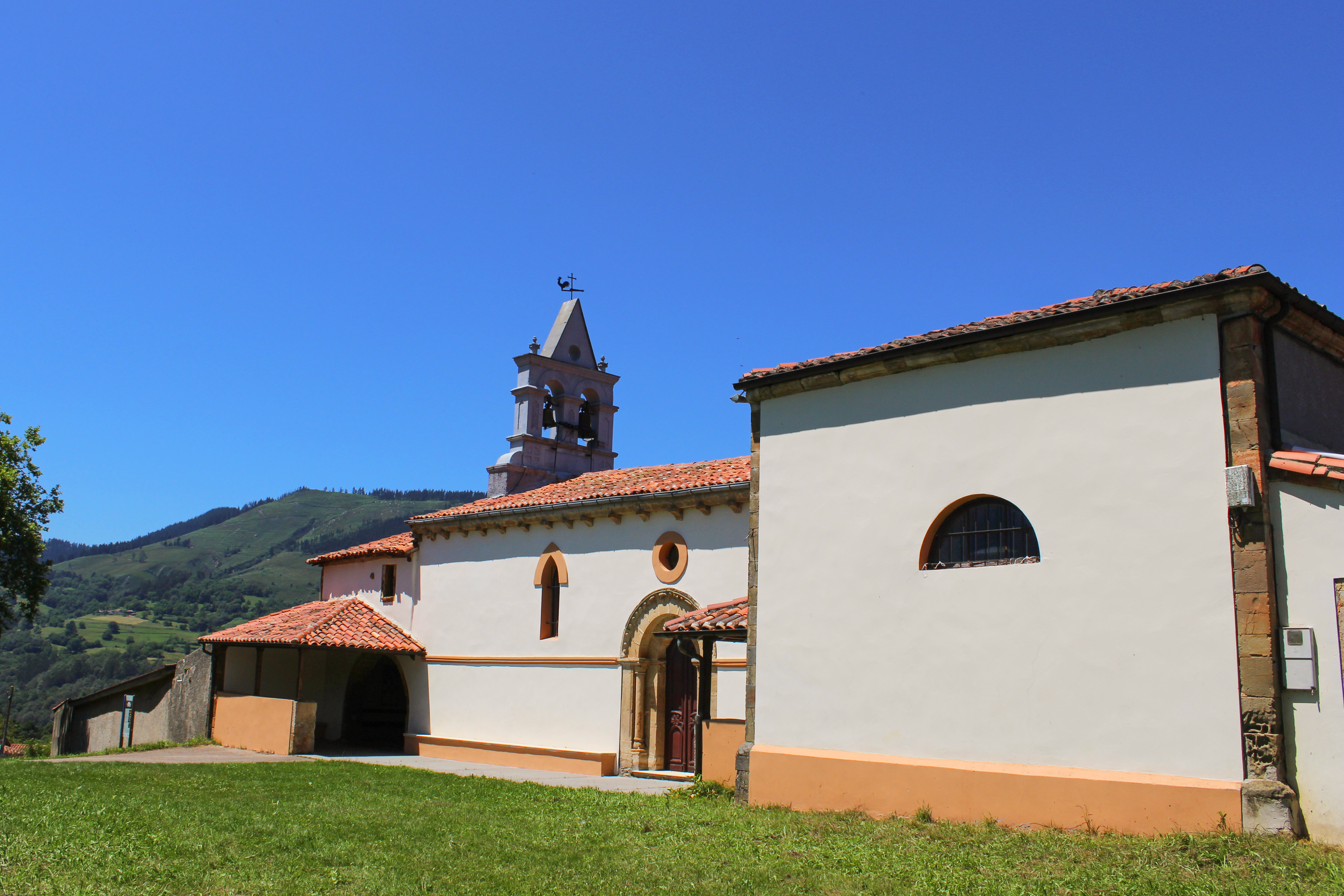
Belonciu (Piloña, Asturias)

Belonciu is one of 24 parishes (administrative divisions) in Piloña, a municipality within the province and autonomous community of Asturias, in northern Spain.

As of 2024, it has a population of 300.

== Villages and hamlets ==
- Areñes
- Belonciu
- Beronda
- Candanéu
- El Peruyeru
- El Raposu
- El Vallín
- Ferreros
- L'Abedul
- La Motosa
- La Peridiella
- La Travesera
- Les Melendreres

=== Other populated places ===
- Bretones
- Campucasín
- Cobona
- El Carril
- El Cotu
- El Foru
- El Llanu
- El Llosón
- El Molín de Donisio
- L'Abedulu
- L'Oteru
- La Bilortera
- La Cabañina
- La Carnera
- La Casa Baxu
- La Casanueva
- La Condesina
- La Naveda
- La Pontiga
- La Quintana
- La Trapiella
- La Vallina
- La Vuelta
- Les Cuartes
- Los Cantores
- Los Cuetos
- Los Llanos
- Los Solares
- Miera
- Pandumolín
- Perumonteru
- Solaiglesia
- Vegarrionda
