= San Román (Amieva) =

- Parish
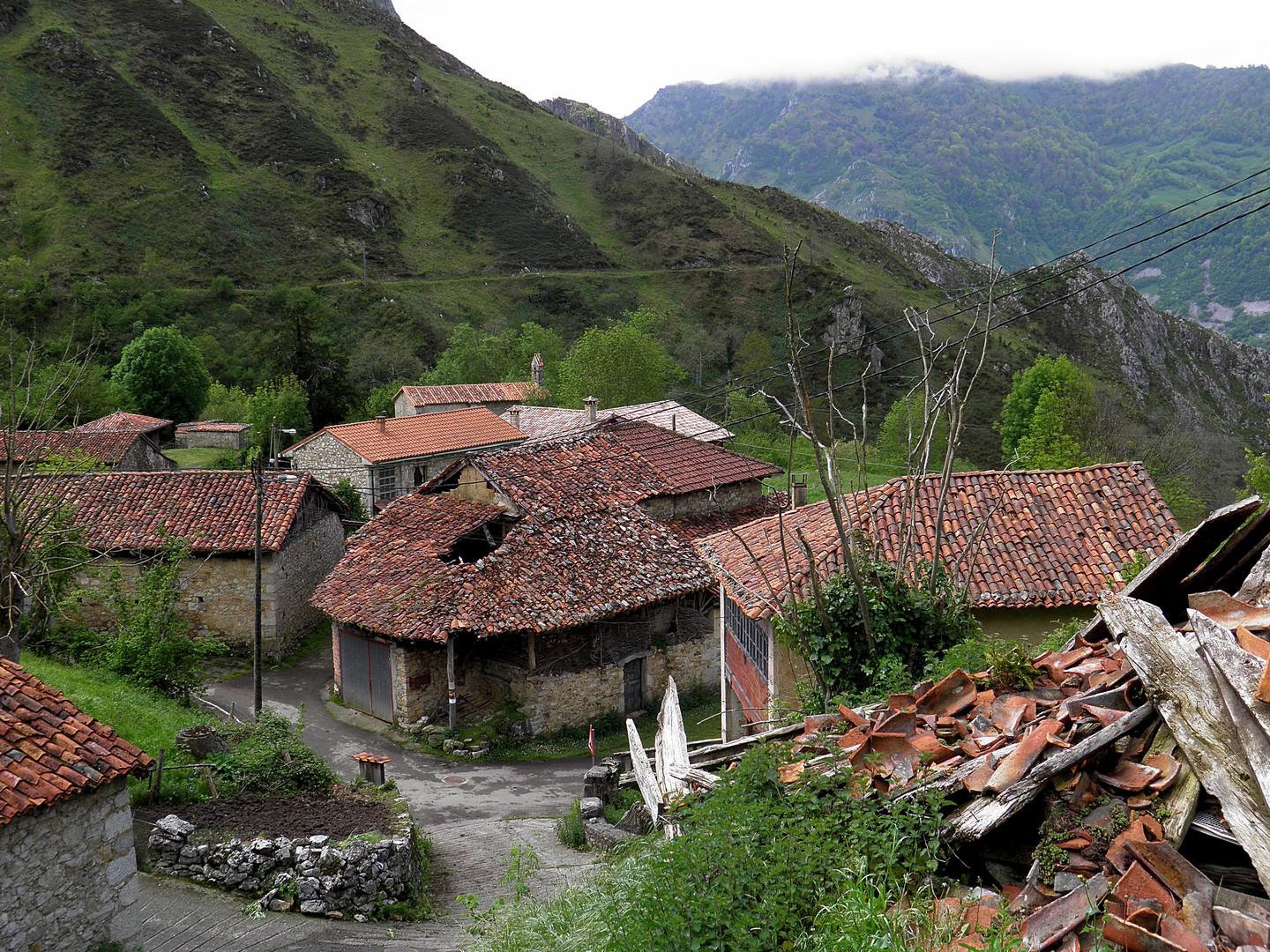

- Location within Spain
- Country: Spain
- Autonomous community: Asturias
- Province: Asturias
- Municipality: Amieva

Area
  - Total: 7.64 km^{2} (2.95 sq mi)

Population (2024)
  - Total: 10
  - Density: 1.3/km^{2} (3.4/sq mi)

San Román is a parish in Amieva, a municipality within the province and autonomous community of Asturias, in northern Spain.

It is located 5 km (3.1 mi) from Sames, the capital of Amieva.

The elevation is 640 m (2,100 ft) above sea level. It is 7.64 km^{2} (2.95 sq mi) in size. The population was 10 as of January 1, 2024. The postal code is 33558.

== Villages ==
- La Llana
- San Román

== Festivals ==
- San Román, 9 August
