= Anayo =

Coordinates: 43.4°N 5.333333°W

Anayo is one of 24 parishes (administrative divisions) in Piloña, a municipality within the province and autonomous community of Asturias, in northern Spain.

== Historical population ==
Number according to the National Statistics Institute (Spain).

| | 2022 | 2021 | 2020 | 2019 | 2018 | 2017 | 2016 | 2015 | 2014 | 2013 | 2012 | 2011 |
|---|---|---|---|---|---|---|---|---|---|---|---|---|
| Males | 59 | 65 | 67 | 68 | 68 | 67 | 70 | 71 | 65 | 69 | 70 | 74 |
| Females | 49 | 47 | 47 | 52 | 53 | 51 | 50 | 49 | 50 | 56 | 55 | 54 |
| Total | 108 | 112 | 114 | 120 | 121 | 118 | 120 | 120 | 115 | 125 | 125 | 128 |

| | 2010 | 2009 | 2008 | 2008 | 2007 | 2006 | 2005 | 2004 | 2003 | 2002 | 2001 | 2000 |
|---|---|---|---|---|---|---|---|---|---|---|---|---|
| Males | 77 | 78 | 82 | 82 | 83 | 86 | 87 | 92 | 92 | 92 | 100 | 102 |
| Females | 56 | 58 | 59 | 59 | 63 | 65 | 68 | 69 | 75 | 80 | 81 | 84 |
| Total | 133 | 136 | 141 | 141 | 146 | 151 | 155 | 161 | 167 | 172 | 181 | 186 |

== Villages and hamlets ==
- Caparea
- Colluenzu
- Fresnosa
- Ḥuentes
- La Cuesta Villar
- Les Pedraces
- Llares
- Robléu

=== Other populated places ===
- Bustiellu
- Casagüerta
- El Bravial
- El Caminucu
- El Caneyu
- El Cantón
- El Cordel
- El Cuetu
- El Cándanu
- El Pedrosu
- El Pingarón
- Faéu
- L'Arbeyal
- La Casuca
- La Cuenya
- La Llobera
- La Llomba
- La Molinera
- La Quintana
- La Venta'l Mosquil
- La Viña
- Les Codes
- Les Cuerries
- Los Montes
- Los Payarones
- Pandiellu
- Piedrabeya
- Santuyán
- Sobustiellu
- Solagüerta
