= L'Arteosa =

Coordinates: 43.304312°N 5.403031°W

L'Arteosa is one of 24 parishes (administrative divisions) in Piloña, a municipality within the province and autonomous community of Asturias, in northern Spain. The population is 101 and its postal code is 33536.

== Villages and hamlets ==
- Caperea
- Óbana
- El Piñuecu
- Samartín
- Les Felgueroses
- Vegarrionda

Other small locations are: L'Acebal, El Casar, Socastru and La Vega.
