= El Remediu =

- Parish
- Location within Spain
- Coordinates: 43.383333°N 5.533333°W
- Country: Spain
- Autonomous community: Asturias
- Province: Asturias
- Municipality: Nava

El Remediu is one of six parishes (administrative divisions) in Nava, a municipality within the province and autonomous community of Asturias, in northern Spain.

== Villages and hamlets ==
- El Remediu
- El Solanu
- Robléu
- Sierra
- Villamartín de Riba

=== Other populated places ===
- Ceneyu
- Cuñella
- El Caleyu
- El Castañéu
- El Cierru
- El Cotayu
- El Cutu
- El Rebollalón
- El Regatu
- El Reondu
- El Rexáu
- El Villar
- El Xerrón
- Ḥueyos
- L'Abarcón
- L'Apeaderu
- L'Argayón
- L'Oteru
- La Braña
- La Calavera
- La Calaverina
- La Calle
- La Calle'l Sol
- La Campa
- La Carretera
- La Casona
- La Cogolla
- La Güelga
- La Lamparilla
- La Mealla
- La Pedrera
- La Peruyera
- La Pez
- La Piedra
- La Pría
- La Rondiella
- La Traviesa
- La Vega
- Les Escueles
- Mondín
- Otura
- Ribuli
- San Bras
- Santa Rosa
- Viau
- Villamartín
