= Mama Ocllo Coya =

Inca Empire princess and queen consort

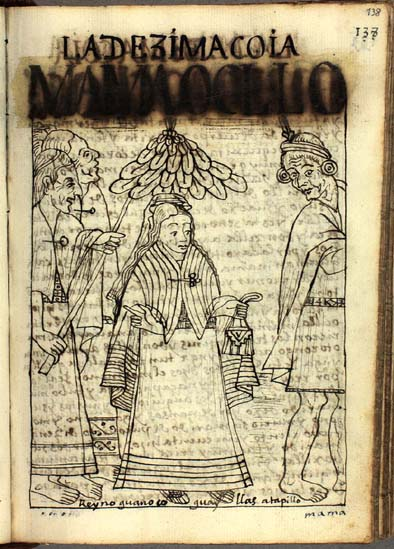
Mama Ocllo Coya

The Coya Mama Ocllo Coya or only Mama Ocllo (Mama Uqllu iskay ñiqin, fl 1493), was a princess and queen consort, Coya, of the Inca Empire by marriage to her younger brother, the Sapa Inca Topa Inca Yupanqui (r. 1471–1493).

== Life ==
Mama Ocllo was the daughter of the Inca Pachacuti Inca Yupanqui, and the sister of Topa Inca Yupanqui. She married her younger brother in accordance with custom and became his legitimate spouse and queen. She was the mother of Huayna Capac and Coya Cusirimay.

=== Queen ===
Queen Mama Ocllo is described as a dominant figure, "desirous for wealth" and remembered for her stratagems by which she was to have wielded great influence upon the affairs of state. According to legend, the queen assisted her spouse in the conquest of a city in Chimor ruled by a female Capallana - the city was possibly Tumbez. When the Capallana refused the Inca's request to submit, Mama Ocllo asked her spouse to allow her to intercede and promised to give him the city without the loss of a single warrior. She had a message sent to the female ruler, that her courage had saved her city and that the Inca army would let it be. She only asked that the Inca ambassador bringing this news would be celebrated with a fest in honor of the gods of the sea, which naturally would take place on boats. When the whole city was occupied afloat at sea to celebrate, the Inca army stormed in and took the city. The Capallana herself became the personal captive of the queen in recognition of the role she had played in the conquest.

=== Later life ===
At the death of her spouse, Topa Inca Yupanqui, in 1493, her son and heir, Huayna Capac, was still a minor. The favorite concubine of her late spouse, Ciqui Ollco, attempted to place her minor son Capac Huari on the throne by spreading planting the rumor, with assistance of a female relative, that the late Inca had willed the throne to Capac Huari. It was queen dowager Mama Ocllo who prevented this attempted coup by planting the rumor that Ciqui Ollco was a witch, had her and her female relative arrested (and probably executed), exiling Capac Huari to Chincheru, and had her own son installed as the next Inca. Huayna Capac, reportedly, never forgot that he owed his throne to his mother, and dedicated that her villa at Picchu be made a holy huaca in remembrance.

Mama Ocllo reportedly died shortly after having secured the throne for her son. The regency during her son's minority was handled by the cousin of her late spouse.

Preceded by Quya Anawarkhi	Coya; Queen consort of the Inca Empire; 1471–1493	Succeeded by Coya Cusirimay
