= Coya (Piloña) =

Parish in Asturias, Spain

Coordinates: 43.393325°N 5.322655°W

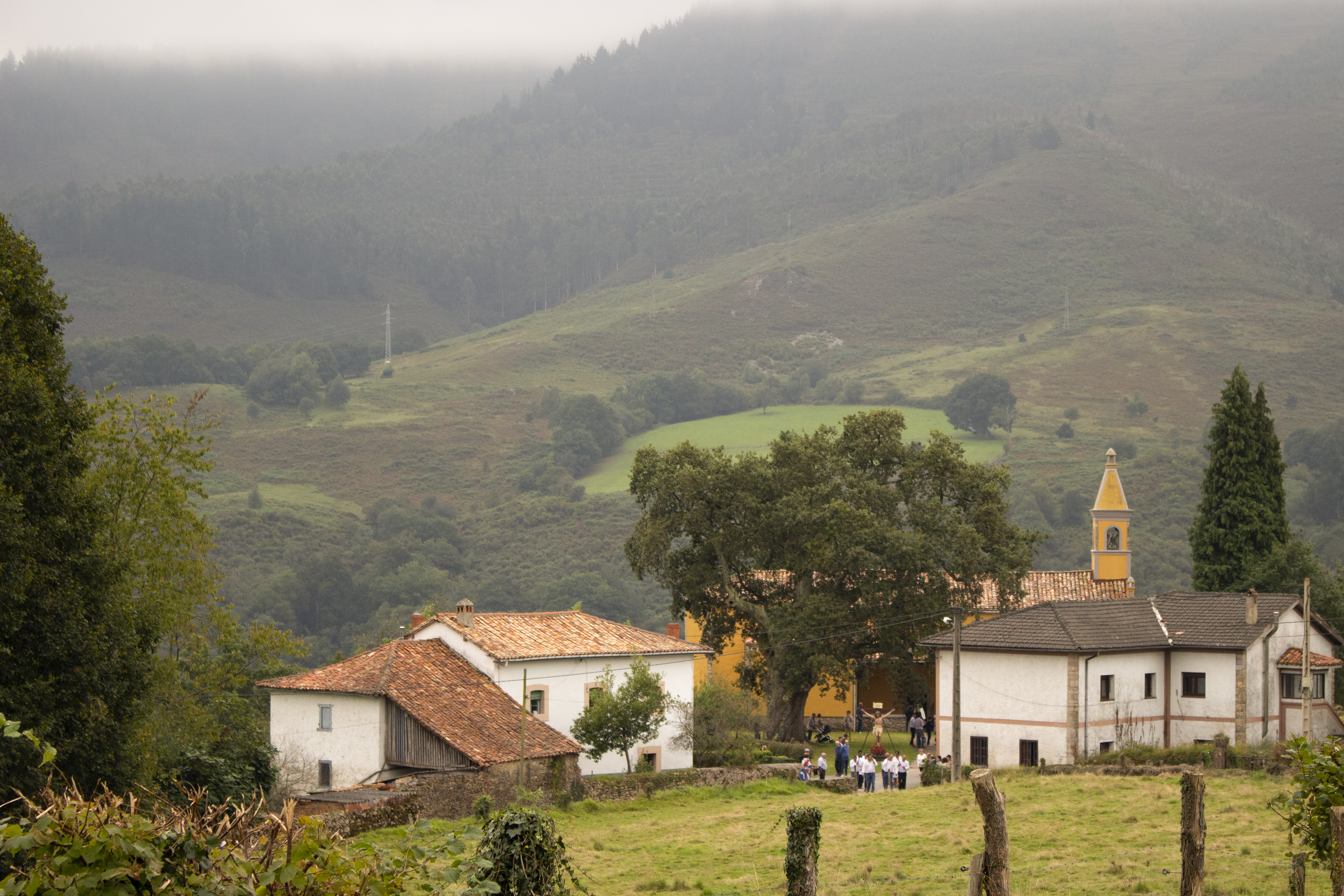

Coya is one of 24 parishes (administrative divisions) in Piloña, a municipality within the province and autonomous community of Asturias, in northern Spain.

The population is 376 (INE 2011).

== Villages and hamlets ==
- Bargaéu
- Brañavieya
- El Bustiellu
- El Caneyu
- Gamonéu
- La Baraya
- La Cabaña
- La Caneya
- La Carabaña
- La Cotariella
- La Gallera
- La Villa Baxu
- La Villa Riba
- Montecoya
- Mures
- Sarpiéu
- Trambarría

=== Other populated places ===
- Cailagua
- Curuxéu
- El Barréu
- El Castañéu
- El Fontán
- El Mortoriu
- El Palombu
- El Rabión
- L'Oteru
- La Baraya de Baxu
- La Baraya de Riba
- La Barrosina
- La Casa la Chata
- La Devesa
- La Estrada
- La Llosona
- La Panda
- La Rasa
- La Sienra
- La Ventuca
- Les Felgueres
- Les Vegues
- Los Navales
- Los Rebollinos
- Piedramayor
- Samiguel
- Sotu
