= Cerecea =

Coordinates: 43.381667°N 5.248889°W

Cerecea is one of 24 parishes (administrative divisions) in Piloña, a municipality within the province and autonomous community of Asturias, in northern Spain. Its population is 239.

== Villages ==
- Berducéu
- Brañella
- Caldevilla
- Cerecea
- El Cantudoba
- La Braña
- La Bárcena
- La Mercoria
- La Naveda
- La Sementada
- Los Collaos
- Robléu
- Sardea
- Tresagüeli

=== Other populated places ===
- Beyubaxu
- Beyurriba
- Brez
- Cantulacebu
- Casares
- Catuxa
- Cienes
- Cimavilla
- Codiya
- Col
- Cuetumayor
- Cúa
- Diezu
- El Barrial
- El Carrizal
- El Comartoriu
- El Cuetu
- El Cuetu Baxu
- El Cuetu Riba
- El Fontán
- El Gorgollu
- El Güeyu'l Ríu
- El Molín de Cúa
- El Navariegu
- El Navarón
- El Pedrón
- El Perucu
- El Prau
- El Regón
- El Ribayu
- El Rollu
- El Tretu
- L'Acebal
- L'Otu
- L'Uruyán
- La Barraca
- La Campona
- La Caneya
- La Casanueva
- La Casona
- La Collada
- La Coroña
- La Cruz
- La Escosura
- La Fontica
- La Fragua
- La Granxa
- La Llamera
- La Marta
- La Nozalea
- La Obra
- La Robellada
- La Rotella
- La Selva
- La Teyera [de Cerecea]
- La Teyera [de Sardea]
- La Verruga
- Lloréu
- Lo Riberu
- Los Campones
- Los Dices
- Los Nozalinos
- Los Pozos
- Paniceres
- Paraes
- Piedresblanques
- Pumarada
- Quileña
- Rubianes
- Soviña
- Valdiezu
- Villanueva
