= Catholic Organizations for Youth in Asia =

Catholic Organizations for Youth in Asia (COYA) is a network of Catholic youth organizations in Asia.

== History ==
In 2007 the Youth Desk of the Federation of Asian Bishops' Conferences initiated a meeting of Catholic youth organizations active in Asia. COYA was founded in 2008.

== Member organizations ==
Country	Name	Acronym	Further remarks
India, Sri Lanka, Philippines	International Federation of Catholic Parochial Youth Movements - Asian Bureau	Fimcap Asia	Asian member organizations of Fimcap: Chiro Youth Movement Philippines, Indian Catholic Youth Movement, Kithu Dana Pubuduwa (Sri Lanka)
South Korea	Hatsal Youth Ministry Institute		
	Fondacio Asia		
		ICPE	
	Jesus Youth		
	Couples For Christ - Youth For Christ	CFC-YFC	
