= Tresali =

- Parish
- Location within Spain
- Coordinates: 43.366667°N 5.466667°W
- Country: Spain
- Autonomous community: Asturias
- Province: Asturias
- Municipality: Nava

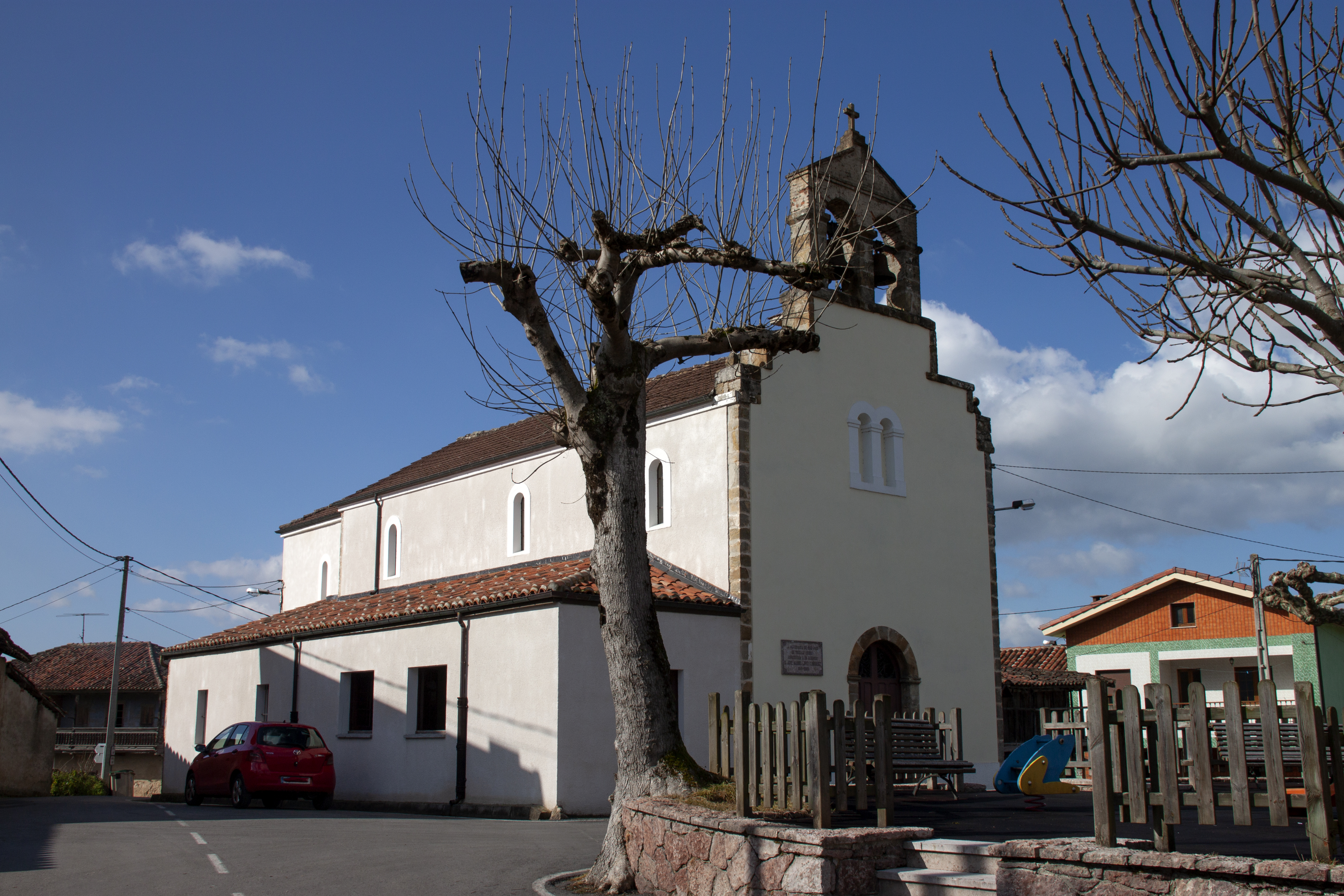
A church in Tresali

Tresali is one of six parishes (administrative divisions) in Nava, a municipality within the province and autonomous community of Asturias, in northern Spain.
