= Cecea =

- Parish
- Location within Spain
- Coordinates: 43.35°N 5.45°W
- Country: Spain
- Autonomous community: Asturias
- Province: Asturias
- Municipality: Nava

Cecea is one of six parishes (administrative divisions) in Nava, a municipality within the province and autonomous community of Asturias, in northern Spain.

== Villages and hamlets ==
- Carancos
- Cecea
- La Cuesta
- La Cueva
- La Faya
- Fresnadiellu
- Grandiella
- Sienra
- La Vega

=== Other populated places ===
- Ali
- Brañavieya
- Cereceres
- Corralnuevu
- Cotalanar
- El Caneyu
- El Cantu [de La Cueva]
- El Cantu [de La Faya]
- El Castañéu
- El Cubilón
- El Gurugú
- El Llendón
- El Pozu la Reina
- El Raicéu
- El Somolín
- El Tropel
- La Casa les Llamargues
- La Casa'l Monte
- La Casería
- La Casuca
- La Cueva Baxu
- La Cueva Riba
- La Estación
- La Llosa
- La Llosanueva
- La Llosona
- La Piedra
- La Quinta
- La Quintana
- La Sierra
- La Trancada
- La Trema
- La Veguca
- Les Arriondes
- Les Pedroses
- Les Viesques
- Los Campos
- Los Pontones
- Mures
- Pedrón
- Silvota
- Sotu
