= San Román (Sariego) =

Coordinates: 43°24′35″N 5°31′9″W

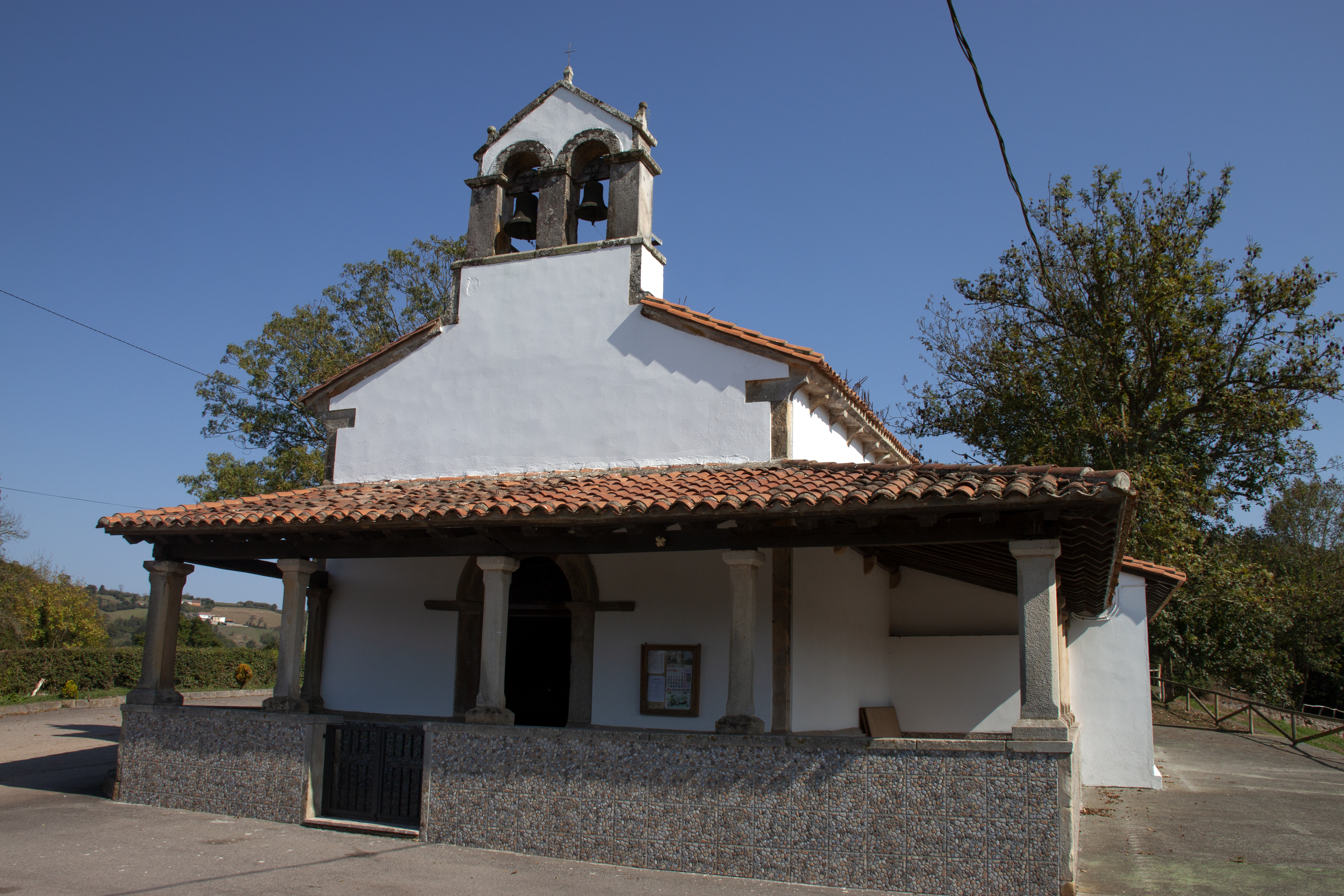
San Román (Sariego)

San Román is one of three parishes in Sariego, a municipality within the province and autonomous community of Asturias, in northern Spain. It is 5 kilometres (3.1 mi) from Vega, the municipal capital.

It is 6.55 km^{2} (2.53 sq mi) in size, with a population of 239 (INE 2005). The postal code is 33518.

== Villages ==
- Acéu
- Figares
- San Román
- Valvidares

== See also ==
- Church of San Román (Sariego)
