= Estero Coya =

Coordinates: 34°12′S 70°32′W

Location
- Country: Chile

The Estero Coya is a river of Chile.

== See also ==
- List of rivers of Chile
