= Nava, Asturias =

Nava
- Municipality
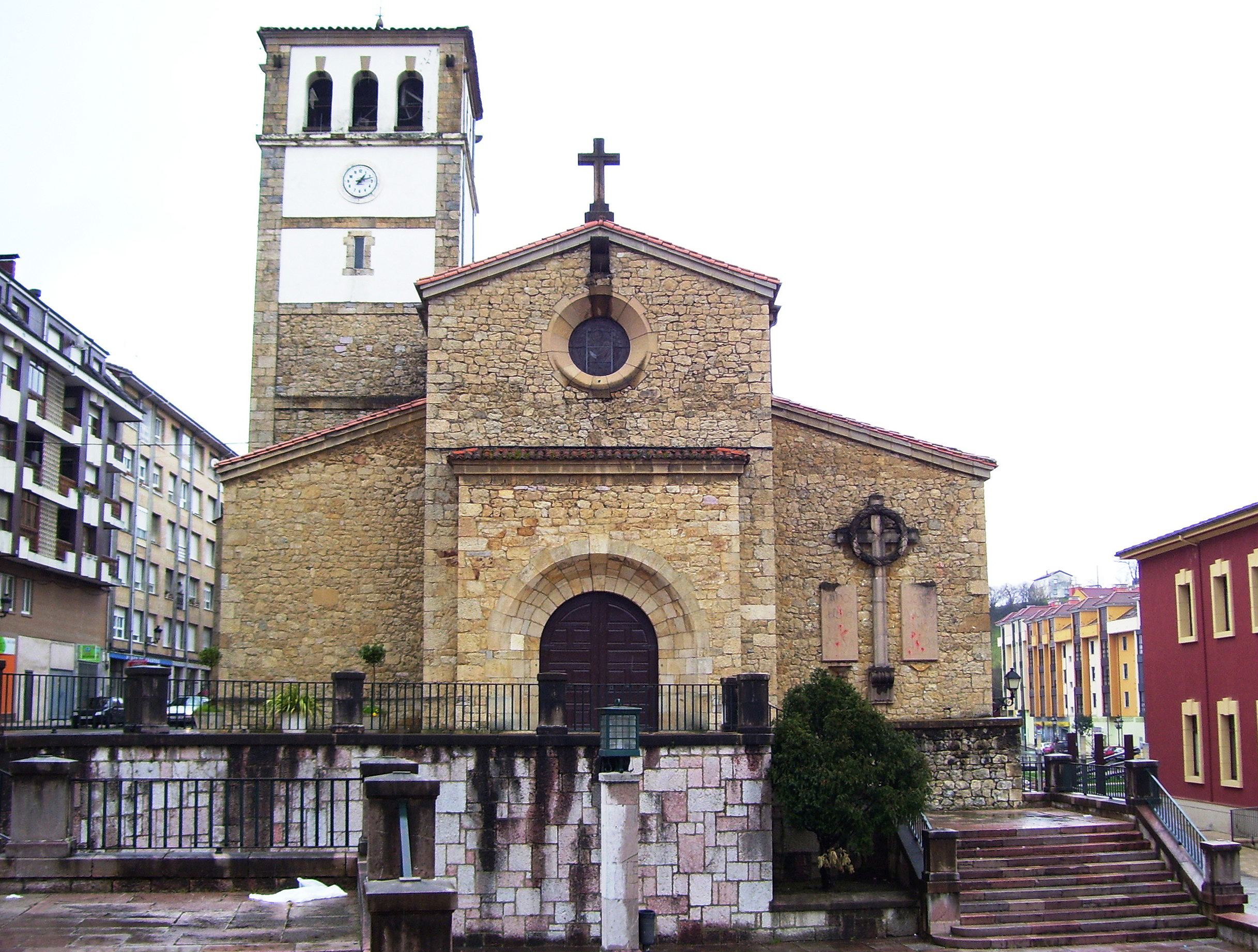
- Church of San Bartolomé, Nava

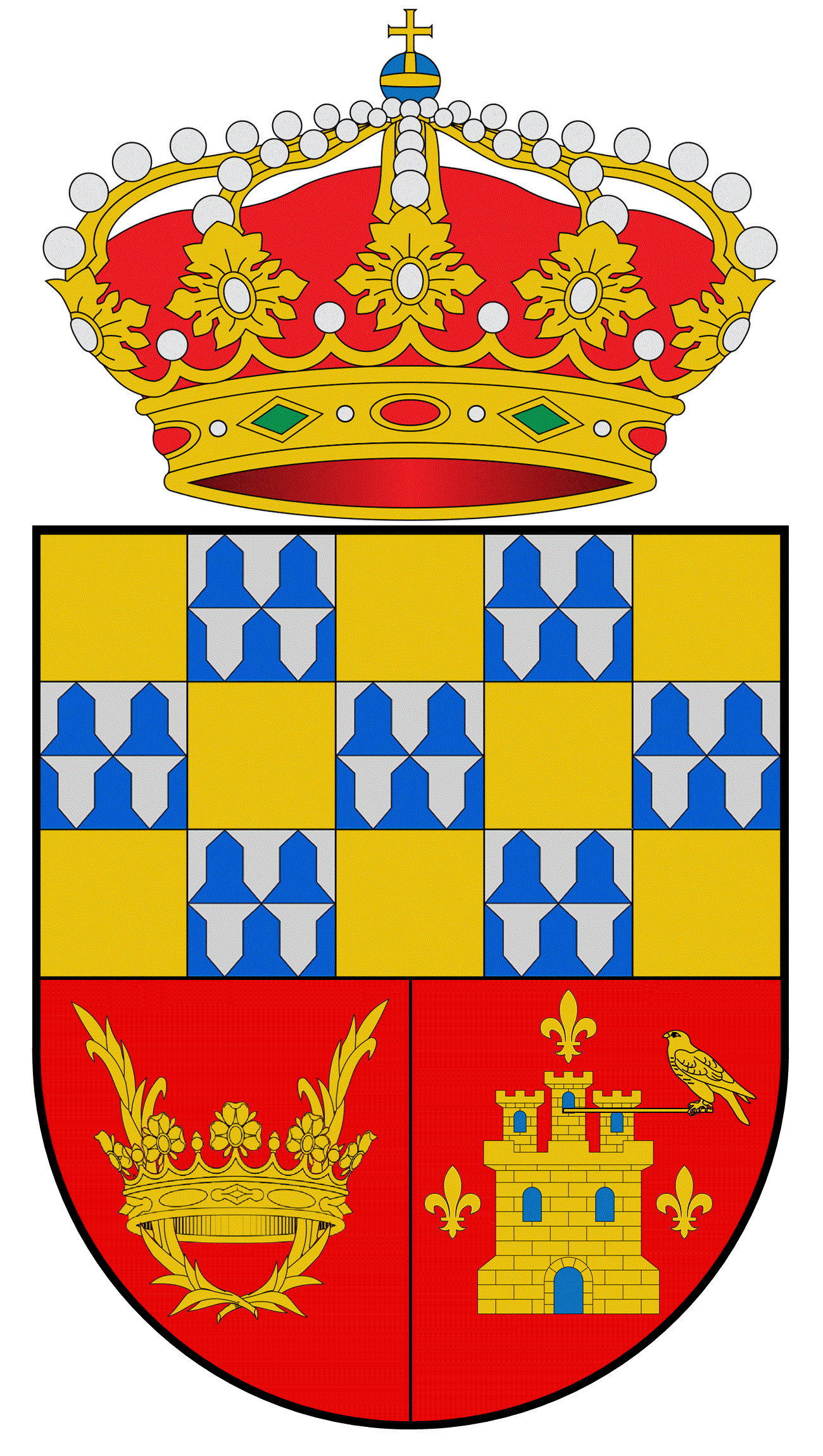
- Flag Coat of arms

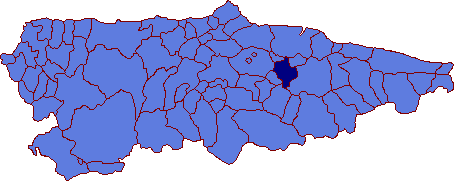

- Location in Spain
- Coordinates: 43°21′N 5°31′W
- Country: Spain
- Autonomous community: Asturias
- Province: Asturias
- Comarca: Oviedo
- Judicial district: Piloña
- Capital: Nava

Government
  - Alcalde: Claudio Escobio Valvidares (PSOE)

Area
  - Total: 95.81 km^{2} (36.99 sq mi)
- Highest elevation: 1,291 m (4,236 ft)

Population (2025-01-01)
  - Total: 5,244
  - Density: 54.73/km^{2} (141.8/sq mi)
- Demonym: naveto
- Time zone: UTC+1 (CET)
  - Summer (DST): UTC+2 (CEST)
- Postal code: 33520
- Website: Official website

Nava is a municipality in the Autonomous Community of the Principality of Asturias, Spain. It is also the name of one of the parishes in this municipality, as well as the name of the municipal capital.

Nava is bordered on the north by Sariego, Villaviciosa and Cabranes, on the south by Laviana and Piloña, on the east by Piloña, and on the west by Bimenes and Siero.

The Cider Museum, dedicated to the Asturian national drink, is located in the capital.

== Parishes ==
There are six parishes (administrative divisions):

- Ceceda
- Cuenya
- El Remedio
- Nava
- Priandi
- Tresali

== Politics ==
Elecciones municipales
Partido	1979	1983	1987	1991	1995	1999	2003	2007	2011	2015
FSA-PSOE	9	8	8	6	6	5	6	7	5	7
Asturianistes por Nava-UNA / Asturianistes por Nava-CxA							2	2	3	3
FAC									3	1
AP / PP		5	3	6	6	4	5	4	2	1
UCD / CDS			2							
PAS-UNA / PAS				1	1	4				
Independents	4									
Agora Nava										1
Total	13	13	13	13	13	13	13	13	13	13

== See also ==
- List of municipalities in Asturias
