= Coya Cusirimay =

The Coya Coya Cusirimay (floruit 1493), was a princess and queen consort, Coya, of the Inca Empire by marriage to her brother, the Sapa Inca Huayna Capac (r. 1493–1527). She was said to be responsible for the relief and well being of her people after natural disasters struck. She was second in command to the emperor.

Coya Cusirimay was the daughter of the Inca Topa Inca Yupanqui and Mama Ocllo Coya, and the full sister of Huayna Capac. After his succession to the throne in 1493, she married her brother in accordance with custom. She thereby became the 11th coya of the Inca Empire. Coya Cusirimay had no sons, and reportedly died early on in the reign of her spouse.

== General references ==
- Burr Cartwright Brundage: Empire of the Inca
- Susan A. Niles: The Shape of Inca History: Narrative and Architecture in an Andean Empire
- Reiner Tom Zuidema: The Ceque System of Cuzco: The Social Organization of the Capital of the Inca

Preceded by Mama Ocllo Coya	Coya; Queen consort of the Inca Empire; 1493-1527	Succeeded by Rahua Ocllo
