= Mian (Amieva) =

- Parish
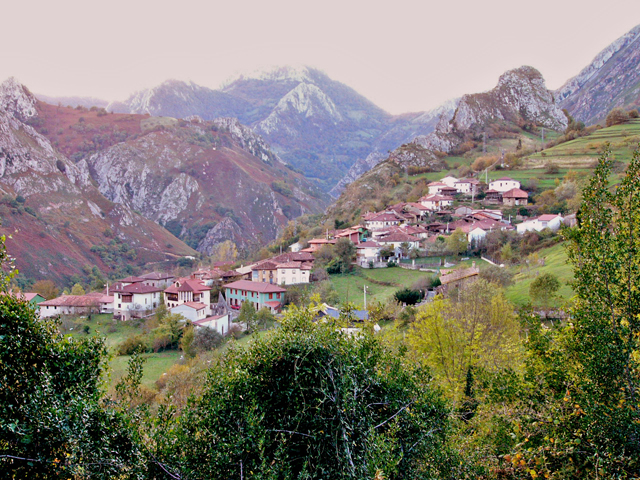

- Location within Spain
- Country: Spain
- Autonomous community: Asturias
- Province: Asturias
- Municipality: Amieva

Area
  - Total: 19.45 km^{2} (7.51 sq mi)

Population (2024)
  - Total: 243
  - Density: 12.5/km^{2} (32.4/sq mi)

Mian is a parish in Amieva, a municipality within the province and autonomous community of Asturias, in northern Spain.

Sames, the capital of Amieva is located in Mian.

The elevation is 340 m (1,120 ft) above sea level. It is 19.45 km^{2} (7.51 sq mi) in size. The population was 243 as of January 1, 2024. The postal code is 33558.

== Villages ==
- Buxil
- Carbes
- Corigos
- Jumoriu
- La Fresneda
- La Llandera
- La Llomba
- Les Vegues
- Les Estazaes
- Los Grazos
- Matabueyes
- Miyares
- Parcia
- Pervís
- El Pontigo
- Precendi
- Puente Dobra
- Sames
- Santillán
- Treyacrespa
- Vega de Pervís
- Vis
