= San Román (Piloña) =

Coordinates: 43°21′34″N 5°19′42″W

San Román is one of 24 parishes (administrative divisions) in Piloña, a municipality within the province and autonomous community of Asturias, in northern Spain.

The population is 243 (INE 2011).

== Villages and hamlets ==
- Argandenes
- San Miguel
- San Román
- Valles
- La Aguilera
- Pandoto (Pandotu)
- Pascual
- San Pedro
- Soto de San Roman
- Torion
- Villartemi
- Campo Redondo
