= Iglesia de Santo Tomé (Priandi) =

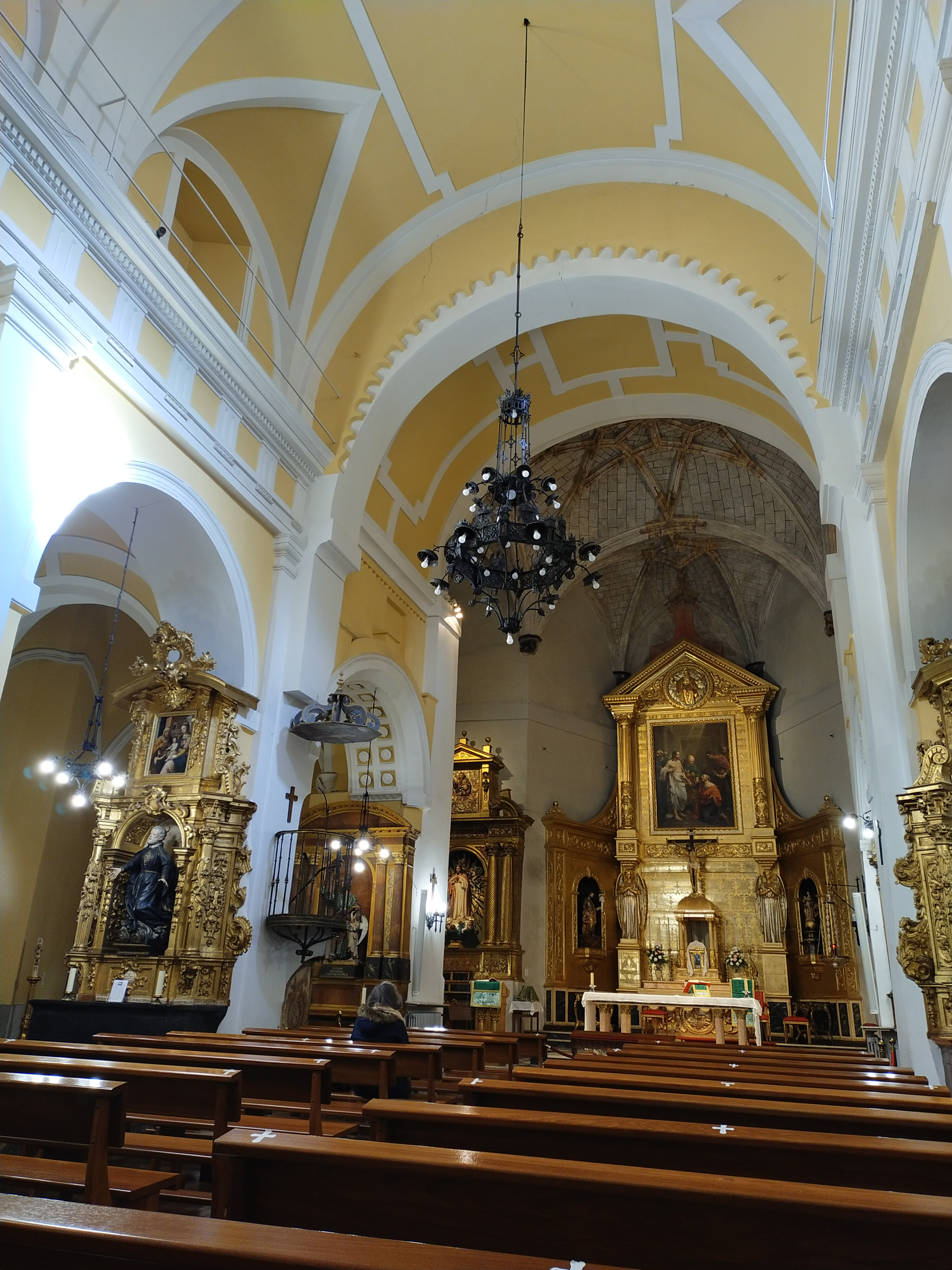
- Location: Asturias, Spain

Iglesia de Santo Tomé (Priandi) is a church in Asturias, Spain.
