= Church of Santiago (Sariego) =

Coordinates: 43.4067°N 5.5404°W

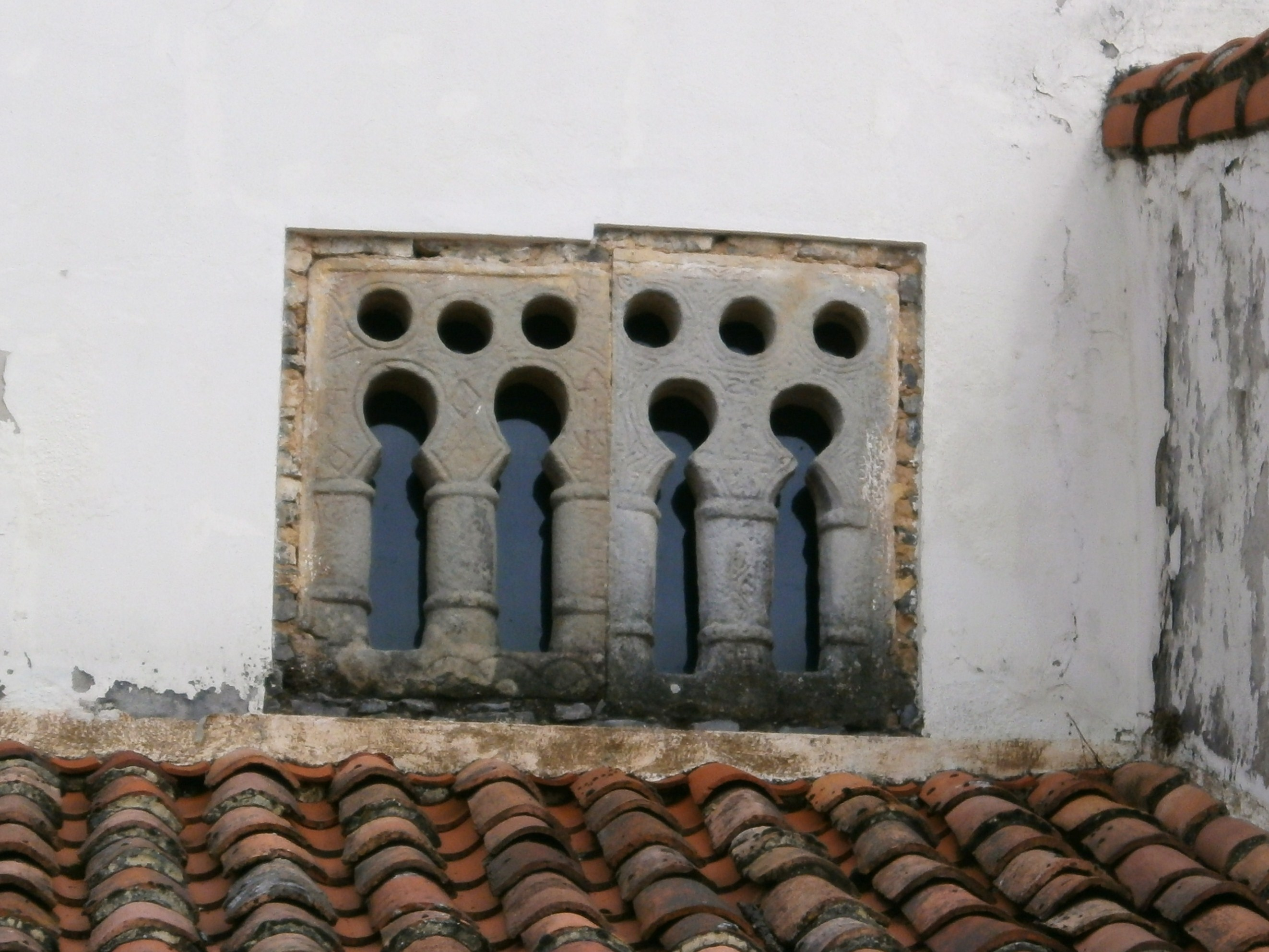
- Church of Santiago (Sariego)
- Location: Asturias, Spain
- Denomination: Roman Catholic

The Church of Santiago (Spanish: Iglesia de Santiago de Sariego or Santiago el mayor) is a Roman Catholic church in the town of Sariego, in the community of Asturias, Spain.

Originally built in the 10th century, the church has pre-Romanesque windows reminiscent of those of the Church of San Salvador de Valdediós. (Pre-Romanesque architecture in Asturias is framed between the years 711 and 910, the period of the creation and expansion of the kingdom of Asturias). It was refurbished in the 15th or 16th centuries.

Church of Santiago in Sariego, Asturias

The church was burned down during the Spanish Civil War and rebuilt..
