= Sames (Amieva) =

Town in Amieva, Spain

Coordinates: 43°16′N 5°08′W

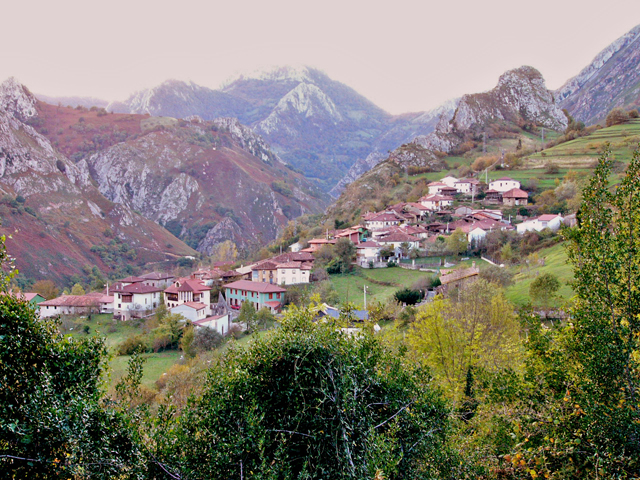
Sames

Sames is the capital of the parish of Mián, the municipality of Amieva, in the principality of Asturias, Spain. The Iglesia de Santa María is about a kilometer from the town.

Sames is located at 220 m (720 ft) above sea level and has a population of 74 inhabitants (INE 2005).

It is 82 km (269,000 ft) from Oviedo, the capital of Asturias.
