= Infiesto, Piloña =

Infiesto L'Infiestu
- Town
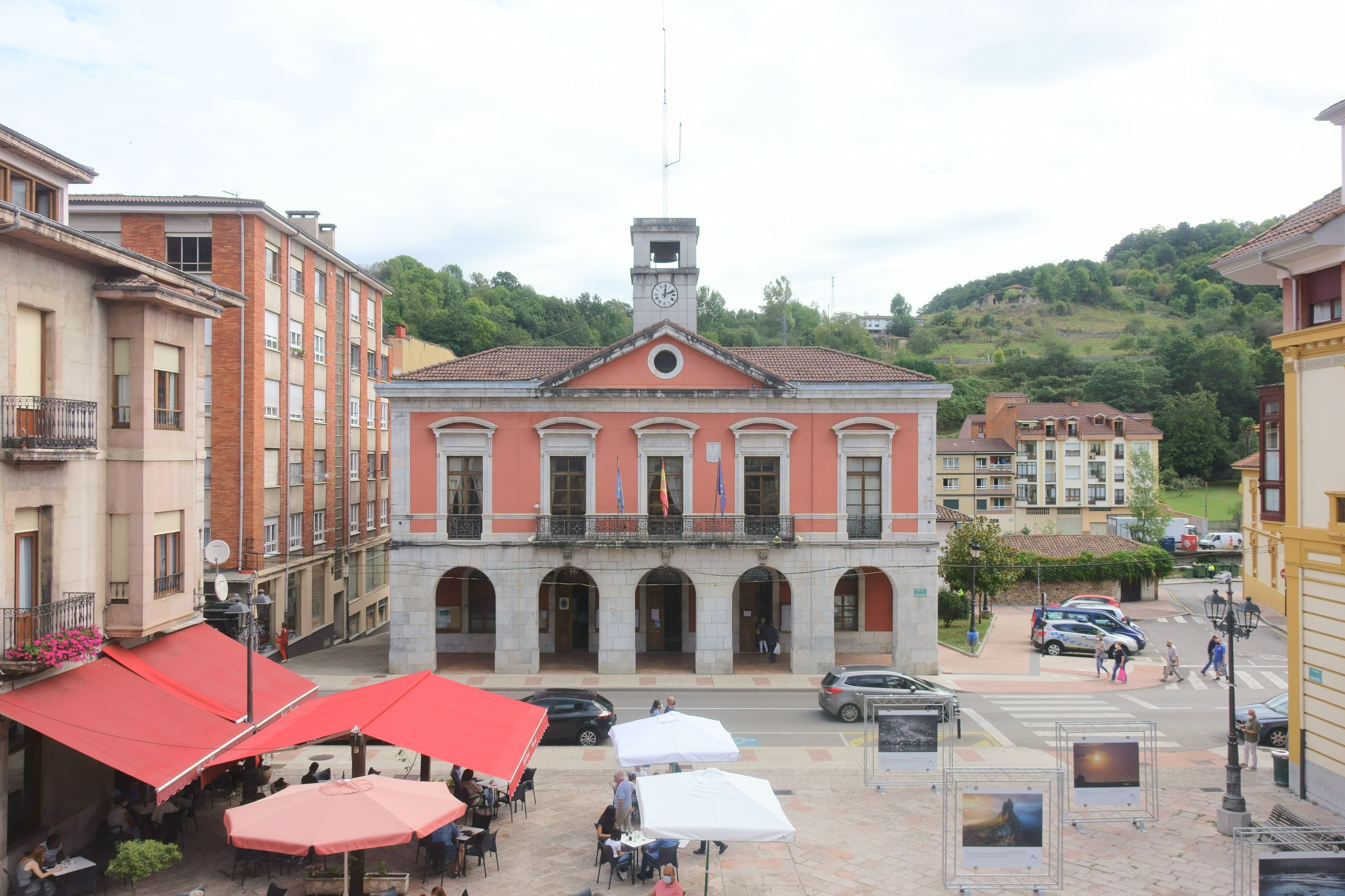

- Location within Asturias
- Country: Spain
- Principality: Asturias
- Muncipality: Piloña
- Parish: San Antonio

Population (2021)
  - Total: 2,380

Infiesto ([iɱˈfjes.to], in Asturian: L'Infiestu) is a town and the capital of the Asturian muncipality of Piloña, in northern Spain. It is located in central Asturias in the riverbed of the Piloña.

== Transport ==
Infiesto developed historically as a key transit and communication route between central Asturias and León, via the passage through the El Pontón pass. Today, it serves as a well-connected residential center, located along the N-634 national highway and featuring an ADIF trains station operated by Renfe Cercanías.

== Regular Events ==
Every year in April, the canoeing event "Descent of the Piloña River" takes place, starting in Infiesto.
