= Sella River (Bay of Biscay) =

River in Asturias, Spain

Coordinates: 43°28′02″N 5°03′51″W

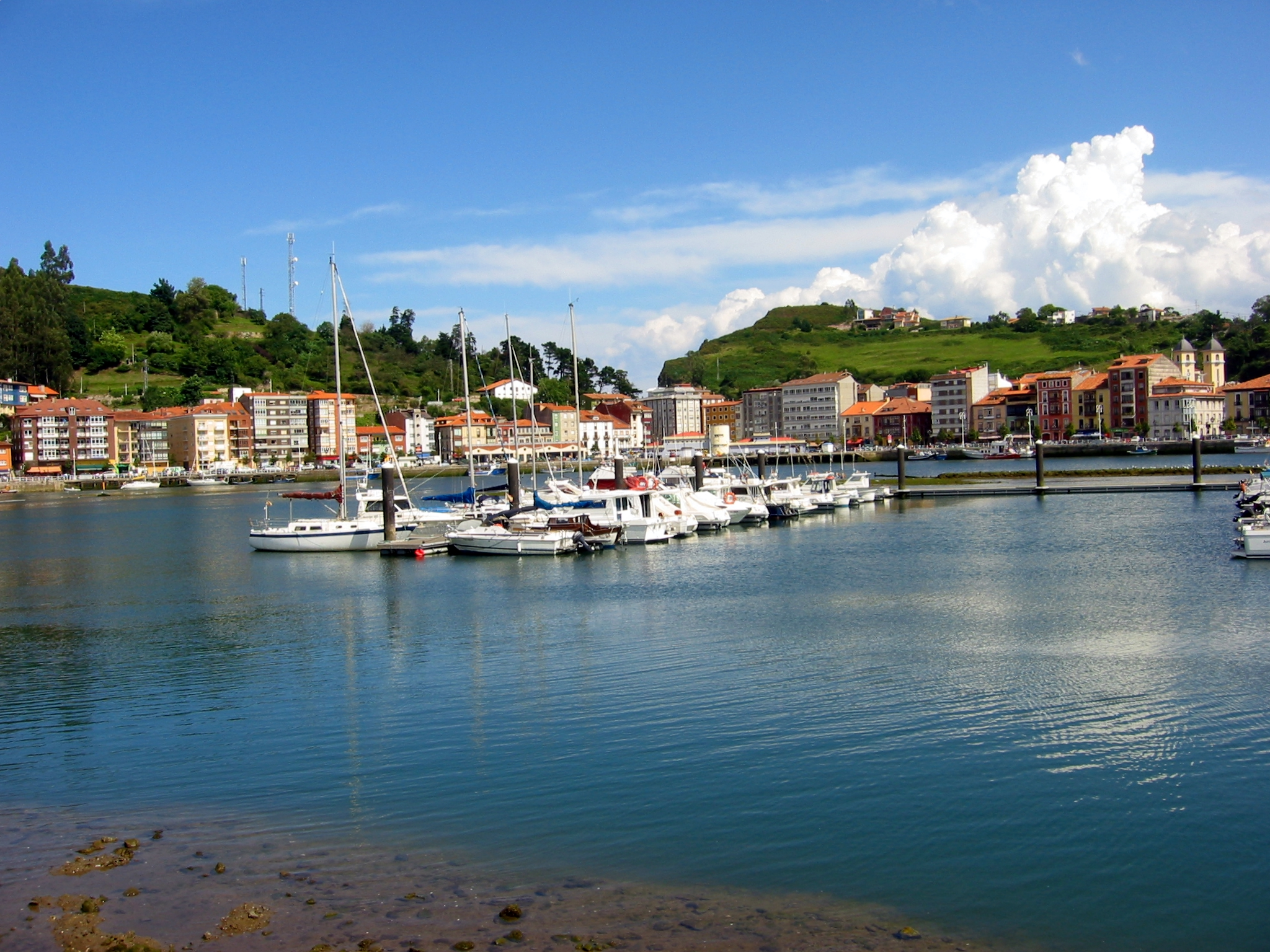
Sella River

The Sella (Asturian: Seya) is a river located in northwest Spain. It flows through the province of León and Asturias from the Picos de Europa to the Cantabrian Sea of the Atlantic Ocean at Ribadesella.

== See also ==
- List of rivers of Spain
