= Mining Basins (Asturias) =

43°10′22.01″N 5°37′35.5″W

Councils of the Nalón and Caudal valleys

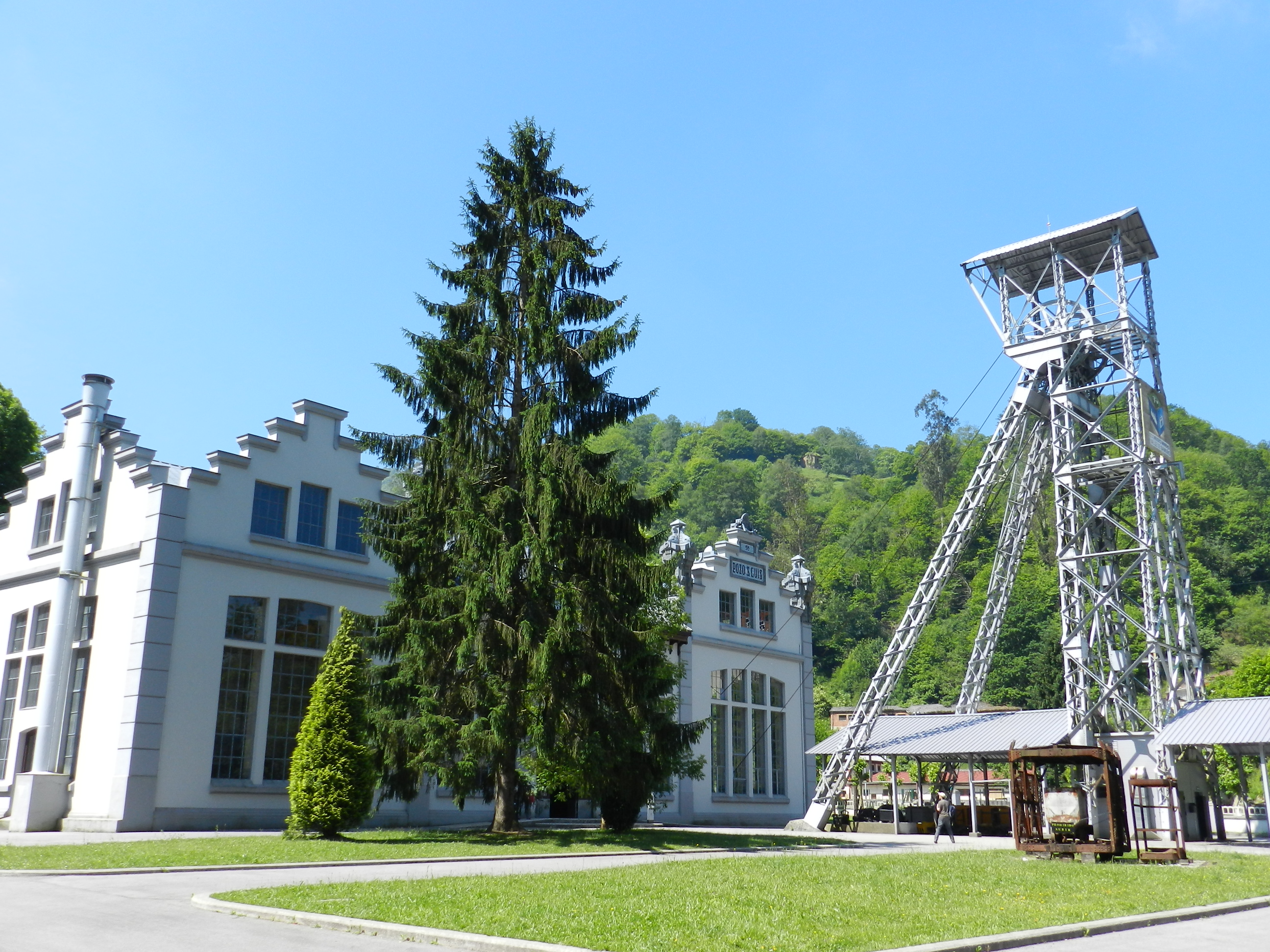
Old San Luis Well, today the Samuño Valley Mining Ecomuseum.

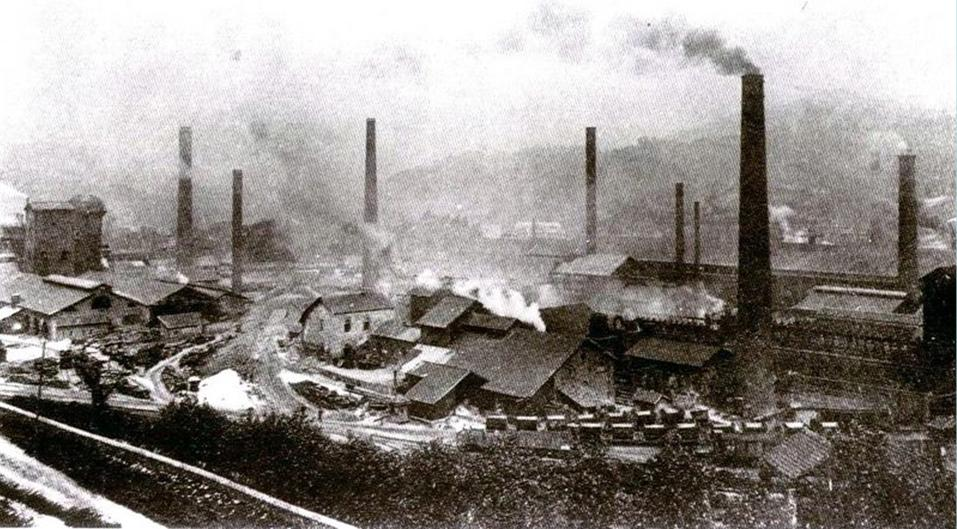
The mining and steel company Duro Felguera in the 1920s.

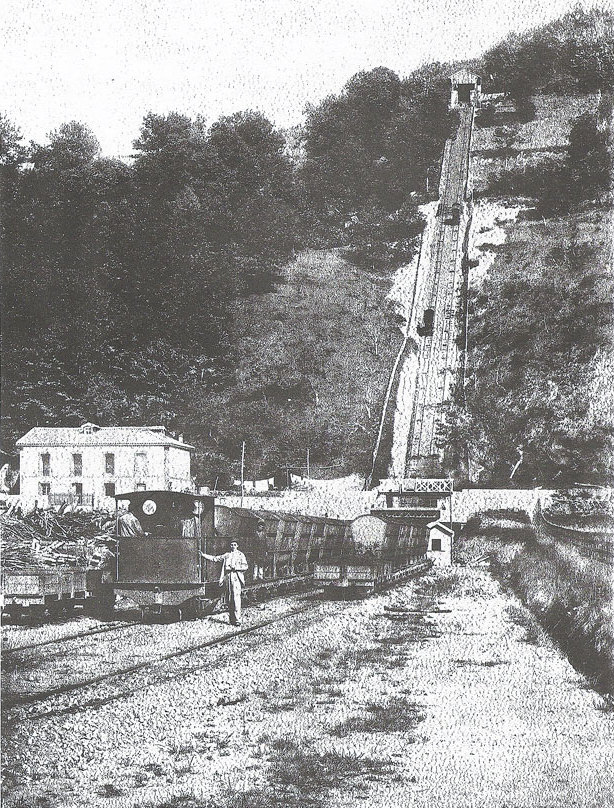
Inclined plane in mountain mining

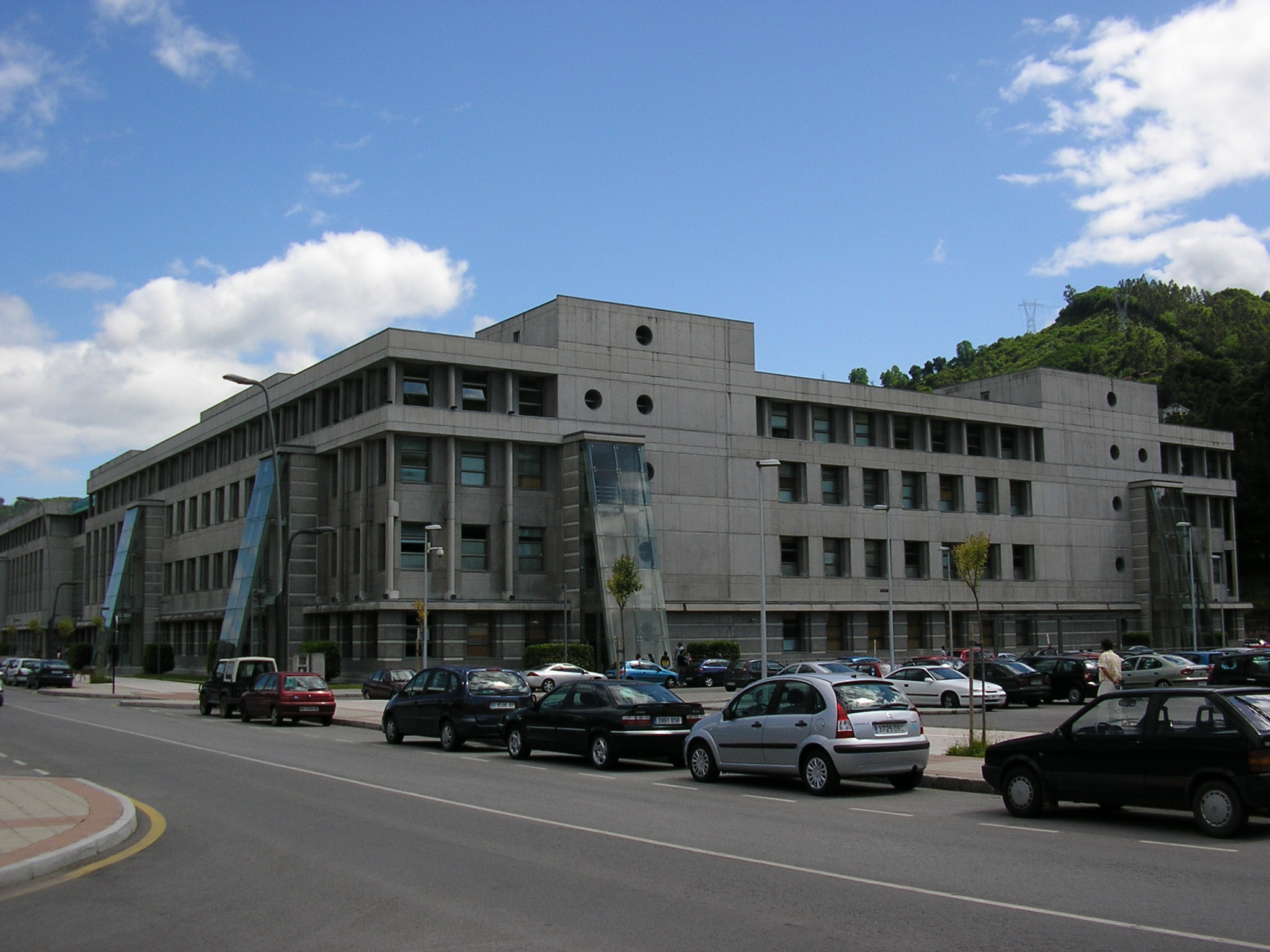
University of Oviedo, Mieres Campus.

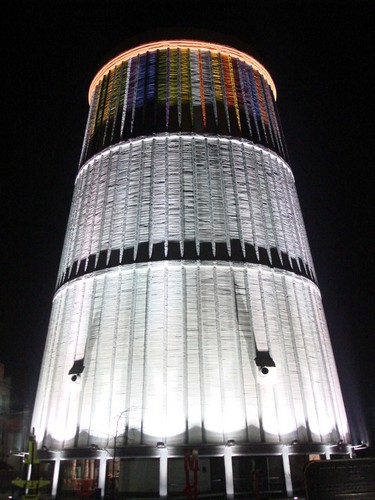
Asturias Iron and Steel Museum, in La Felguera.

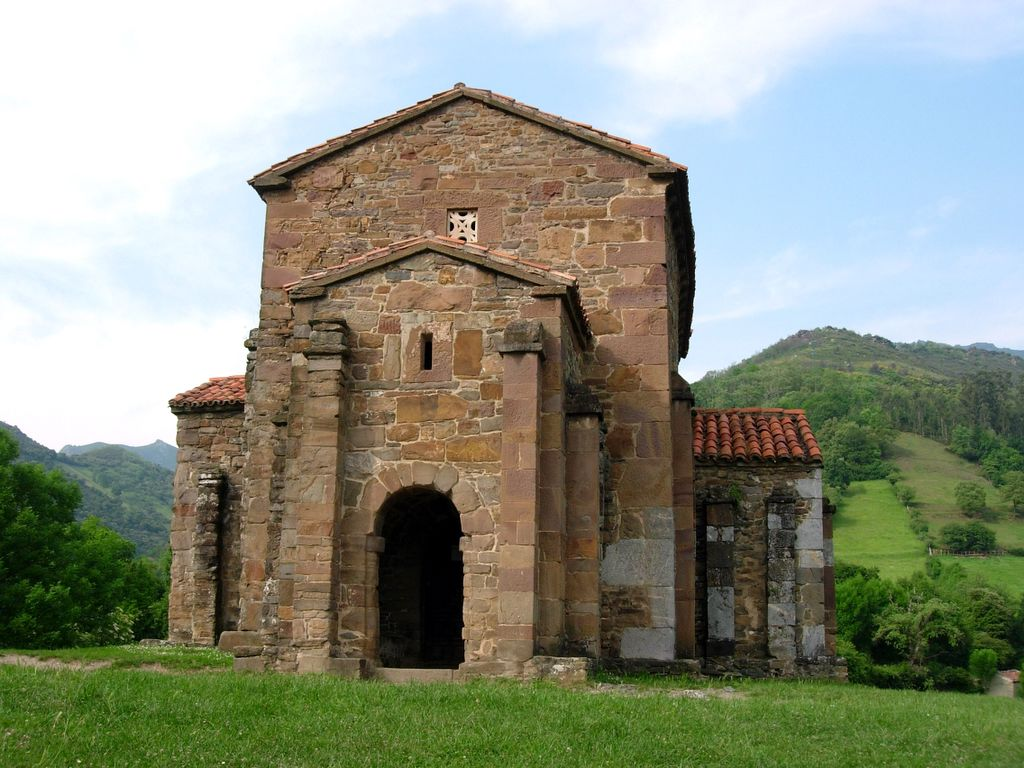
Pre-Romanesque temple of St. Christine of Lena.

The Mining Basins (also known as the Asturian Mining Basins or the Cuenques Mineres and Cuencas Mineras in Asturian and Spanish) is the name traditionally given to the historical territory located in the Central Coal Basin (Cuenca Hullera Central in Spanish) of the Principality of Asturias. It corresponds to one of the most heavily industrialized areas in Spain, especially linked to coal and ferrous metallurgy.

Although more than 20 Asturian municipalities are officially considered mining councils, in different categories, the municipalities that make up the two regions most directly linked to coal and which have had the greatest historical importance in economic, social and cultural matters are popularly referred to as mining councils, such as Caudal Valley (Mieres, Lena, Aller, Ribera de Arriba, Morcín and Riosa) and Nalón Valley (Langreo, San Martín del Rey Aurelio and Laviana).

== Description ==
=== Location ===
The Asturian mining basins are located in the two central valleys that connect the Cantabrian mountains range to the central Asturian plateau, where Oviedo is located. These are the valleys of the Nalón river and Caudal river, as well as their tributaries (mainly the Aller, Candín and Samuño rivers). However, there are populations that have been economically and socially part of this territory, even though administratively they were already in other municipalities (mainly areas of Oviedo and Siero, where coal was also exploited). On the other hand, some municipalities in the Nalón valley region, such as Caso and Sobrescobio, maintained an economic activity not very closely related to industry and without large urban centers.

=== Industrialization ===
In the late 18th century, the properties of the hard coal from these valleys - studied by Jovellanos and others - started to be scientifically known. According to numerous testimonies, coal was used to heat homes in this area since the Middle Ages, and it was not until 1787 when Antonio Carreño y Cañedo reported a fire "that would not be extinguished" that his grandfather had witnessed in Carbayín (due, in fact, to the proximity of a subway coal seam).

Systematic exploitation would not arrive until the 19th century with various state laws and policies aimed at this end. Up to mid-century, mining was carried out in deposits at the surface of the earth or in small wells and shacks. In mid 1848, the blast furnace of the Asturian Mining Company in Ablaña was started up - to later give way to the Mieres Factory - and a few years later the Felguera Factory was founded, under which coal mining increased and the expansion of numerous secondary industries (such as chemical, metallurgical, machinery, food, ceramics, energy, etc.) took place. The exploitation of other deposits, such as mercury, was of lesser importance.

In 1854, the Langreo Railway was inaugurated, the third to start operations in the peninsula, which two years later connected the Nalón Basin to the Gijón port. Shortly after, more railway lines were built, also connecting the Caudal to the coast and the plateau, and the Nalón to Oviedo, at the same time that different mining railroads were built, crossing the valleys carrying ore, weaving a map of hundreds of kilometers of tracks. Throughout the 19th century, numerous mining companies were born, some of them with foreign capital. The most outstanding were Carbones Santa Ana, Carbones de Langreo y Siero, Duro Felguera, Hulleras de Turón or Felgueroso Hermanos...). During the First World War the increase of extracted tons in these two valleys was very significant due to the neutrality of Spain in the war, meaning most of the coal that was exploited in all of Spain. It was at this time that the vertical shafts began to deepen to the detriment of mountain mining, giving rise to the recognizable silhouette of the headframe in the landscape. Some of these mines, such as María Luisa or Candín, are more than 600 meters deep from the surface. The situation was sustained thanks to the protectionist policies of Primo de Rivera, the Second Republic, the upturn due to the Second World War and Franco's autarchy, which made it the area of greatest mineral production in Spain. In parallel, the growth or consolidation of secondary industries, gaining importance in chemical and energy production. For more than a century, thousands of families from the rest of Spain settled in the Mining Basins, with special relevance to the waves of immigrants arriving in the 1940s and 1950s from Andalusia, Extremadura and Galicia.

The industrial progress of the area materialized in many other aspects. The growth of a huge mass of workers, the creation of political, trade union and cultural associations (there were a large number of cinemas, theaters, gatherings, libraries and workers' athenaeums in the Basins), urban growth, especially relevant in places like Mieres, La Felguera, Sama or El Entrego, the proliferation of religious, business and public schools, schools for foremen and arts and crafts, paternalistic political policies (the paradigm of the workers' town Bustiello among them), etc. In the post-war period, immigrant families had to cram into small houses and even occupy hurrians, until the proliferation of cheap housing in company-State collaboration, in the 40s and 50s, popularly known in Asturias as barriadas. The workers' struggle was significant, from timid strikes in the 19th century to the strikes of the beginning of the 20th century (especially relevant "La Huelgona of 1912"), the relevance of the October Revolution of 1934 or the Strike of 1962, the first big strike during Franco's regime.

=== Decline ===
With market liberalization, a bleak future loomed for these regions, despite the creation of the public company Hunosa in 1967, which nationalized coal production and grouped together almost all the mining companies that existed in this area. In the 1960s, the public steel companies Uninsa (Unión de Siderúrgicas Asturianas Sociedad Anónima) and Ensidesa (Empresa Nacional Siderúrgica, S.A.) were born, which concentrated production in Gijón and Avilés. At first they acquired the assets of the basins but gradually closed and moved services to the coast in the 70's, which meant the beginning of the closure of dozens of workshops, factories, the demolition of the Mieres factory and the closure and partial demolition of La Felguera.

The population began to move in large numbers to the coast as well. From the 80s and 90s onwards, the closures of loss-making mining shafts began, especially in the last decade, until the closure of the last mine in 2019, with the exception of the Nicolasa shaft, which maintains some extractive activity. They caused great social conflict between unions, citizens and the different autonomous and state governments. Conflict diminished thanks to the different coal plans and the granting of early retirement, in many cases at an early age.

At the end of the 1990s, the Mining Funds (Fondos Mineros) granted by the Institutes for Coal Restructuring and Alternative Development were created for the restructuring of the mining areas throughout Spain, with a high incidence in Asturias, and the search for an alternative economic fabric to the closure of the industries. These funds, however, were managed with little responsibility, subject to continuous delays or systematic stoppages, especially on the part of the regional government, when they were not used for many projects independent of the economic regeneration of the Mining Basins. The then President of the Principality, Vicente Álvarez Areces, announced during the 2007 election campaign the construction of two large technology parks in the basins (Figaredo in Mieres and Langreo Norte in Langreo), which have not been built.

During the government of José Luis Rodríguez Zapatero these funds were frozen in practice and finally the closure of the mining industry was signed in 2010. In 2011, the European Union ruled the closure of all unprofitable mines by 2018, establishing a timetable from 2013 for the seven remaining wells in Caudal and Nalón, and later projected the end of the aid in 2014. In 2012, faced with the beginning of Mariano Rajoy's government's policy of cuts in mining, there was a great escalation of conflict with a total strike at Hunosa (as in other mining areas of Spain), the regular blocking of road and rail communication routes in the Principality and very violent clashes between authorities and miners in the mountains and in the town center, causing numerous injuries and arrests, as had already occurred in the early 90s.

=== The Basins ===
This region has developed a marked culture based on the intense industrial activity, which can be seen in poetry, song, literature, etc. Sometimes inspired by mining accidents, the laborious working world, industrial progress, the contrast with the rural world (which Armando Palacio Valdés captured in his Aldea perdida) and the struggle for rights and improvements in living conditions. Well known in Asturias and León is the mining hymn of Santa Bárbara Bendita.

At present they still have some heavy industry resources (Bayer Plant, La Pereda Thermal Power Plant and Química del Nalón), business resources (Valnalón Technological City), tourist resources (Museum of the Siderurgy, Mining Museum of Asturias, Ecomuseum and Mining Train of the Samuño Valley, Espinos Well Interpretation Center, Bustiello Interpretation Center, etc. ) natural and sports (Redes Natural Park of the UNESCO Biosphere Reserve, Cuencas Mineras Protected Landscape, Winter Springs) artistic (pre-romanesque, medieval art, urban and industrial heritage) as well as traditional pilgrimages and gastronomic festivals. The uninterrupted demographic crisis that began in the 1970s has increased significantly in recent years. The basins have gone from having more than 220,000 inhabitants in 1970 to less than 130,000 nowadays.

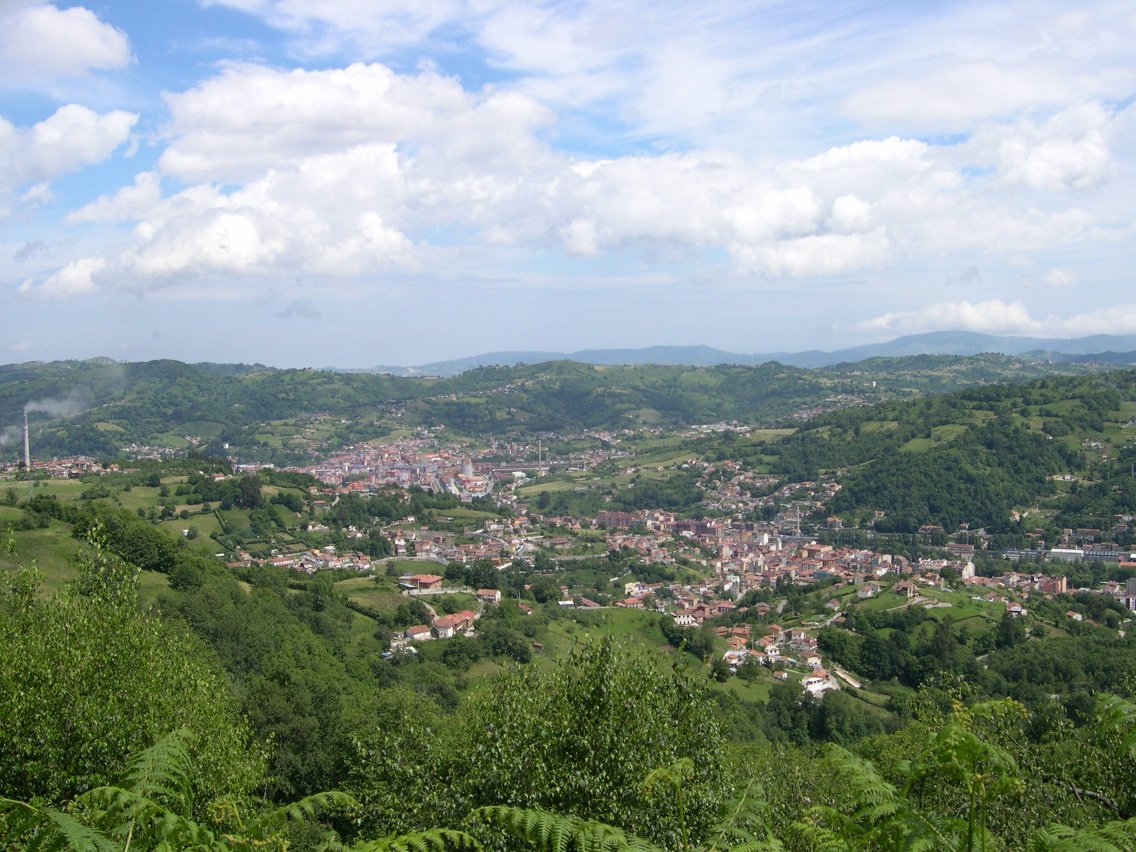
Langreo: Sama and La Felguera

=== Mining Basin towns by population ===
- Langreo (comprising La Felguera, Sama, Ciaño, Lada and Riaño)
- Mieres del Camino
- San Martín del Rey Aurelio (formed by El Entrego, Sotrondio and Blimea)
- Pola de Laviana
- Pola de Lena
- Moreda
- Turón
- Other mining towns are Tuilla, La Nueva, Carrocera, Barredos, Bustiello, Rioturbio, and towns located in other municipalities, such as Tudela Veguín and Olloniego (Oviedo) and Carbayín and Lieres (Siero).

=== Headframes ===
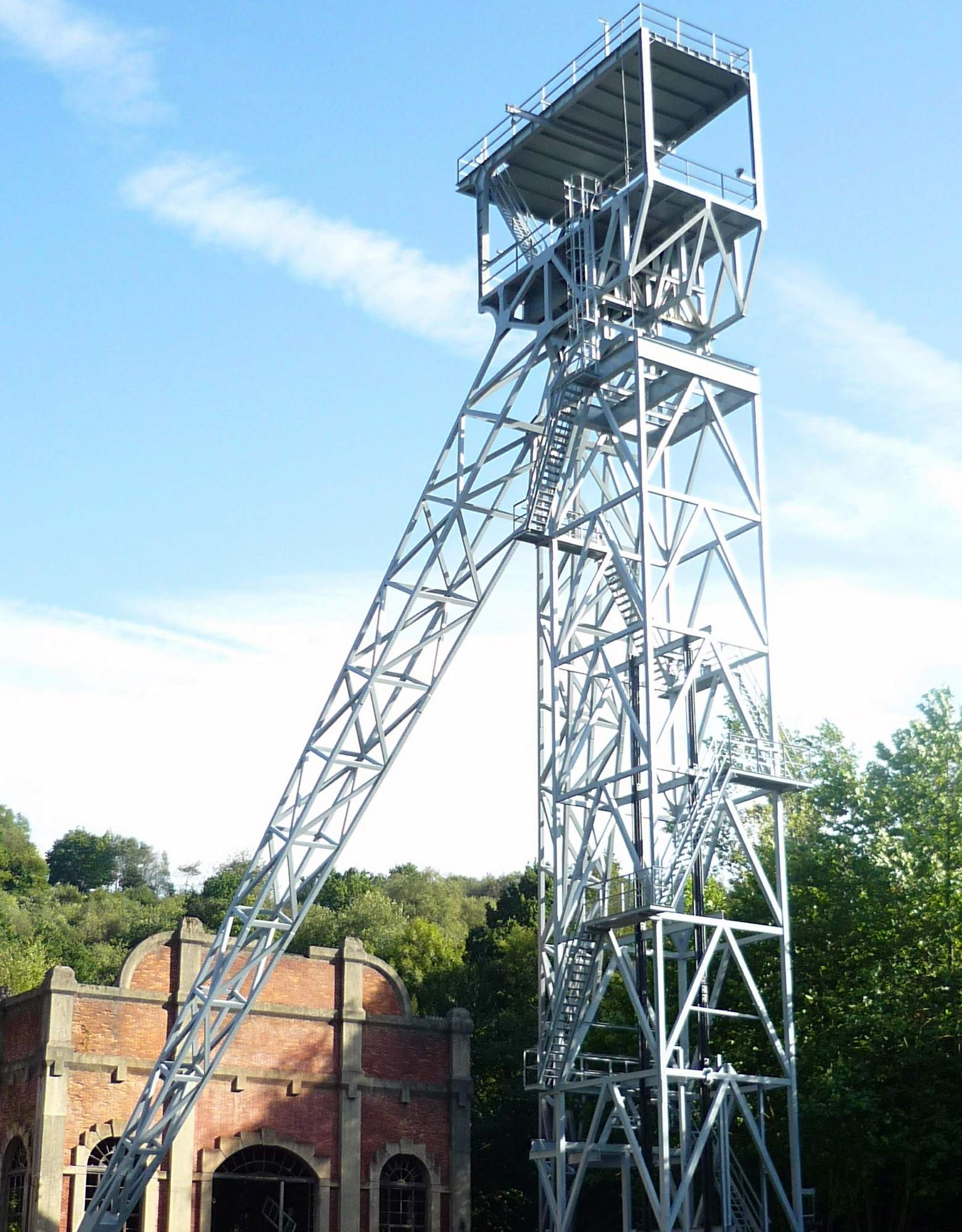
Pit headframe El Terrerón

In spite of the demolitions carried out in recent years, the basins conserve large groups of industrial heritage (numerous mine shafts and small mountain and open-well mines, La Felguera factory, Nitrastur factory, stations, bridges, workers' quarters, engineers' cottages, workshops, etc.) Of course, many of its wells are still closed, most of them in a state of abandonment. Under the basins there are 5,000 kilometers of galleries, that is to say, more kilometers than roads on the surface. These are the ones that still have their headframes and extraction towers:

- Langreo conserves eight headframes: Lláscares Well, Santa Eulalia Well, Fondón Well (one of them), Modesta Well, Samuño Well, El Terrerón Well, San Luis Well and María Luisa Well.
- Siero has five headframes: Pumarabule Well (two), Mosquitera Well, Lieres Well (two).
- Oviedo has one headframe: Olloniego Well.
- Mieres has fifteen headframes: Barredo Well, Llamas Well, San José Well, Figaredo Well (two), Polio Well (two), El Terronal Well, Santa Bárbara Well (two), San Nicolás Well, Tres Amigos Well (plus the auxiliary San Luis), Espinos Well and Peña Well.
- San Martín del Rey Aurelio has eight headframes: Entrego Well, Sorriego Well, Venturo Well, Cerezal Well, Sotón I and Sotón II Wells, San Vicente Well, San Mamés Well.
- Laviana has one headframe: Carrio Well.
- Aller has four headframes: San Antonio Well, Santiago Well, San Fernando Well, San Jorge Well.
- Morcín has one headframe: Montsacro Well.

== See also ==
- Asturias
- History of Asturias
- Mining Museum of Asturias
