= Oscar Perez =

Oscar Perez, Oscar Pérez and Óscar Pérez may refer to:

- Óscar Pérez (footballer, born 1973), Mexican football (soccer) player
- Óscar Pérez (footballer, born 1981), Spanish football (soccer) player
- Óscar Pérez Solís (1882–1951), Spanish artillery officer, engineer, journalist and politician
- Óscar Alberto Pérez (1981-2018), Venezuelan rebel leader
- Oscar García Perez (born 1966), Cuban fencer
- Oscar Pérez (basketball) (1922-2002), Argentine basketball player
