= Aller, Asturias =

Aller Ayer
- Municipality
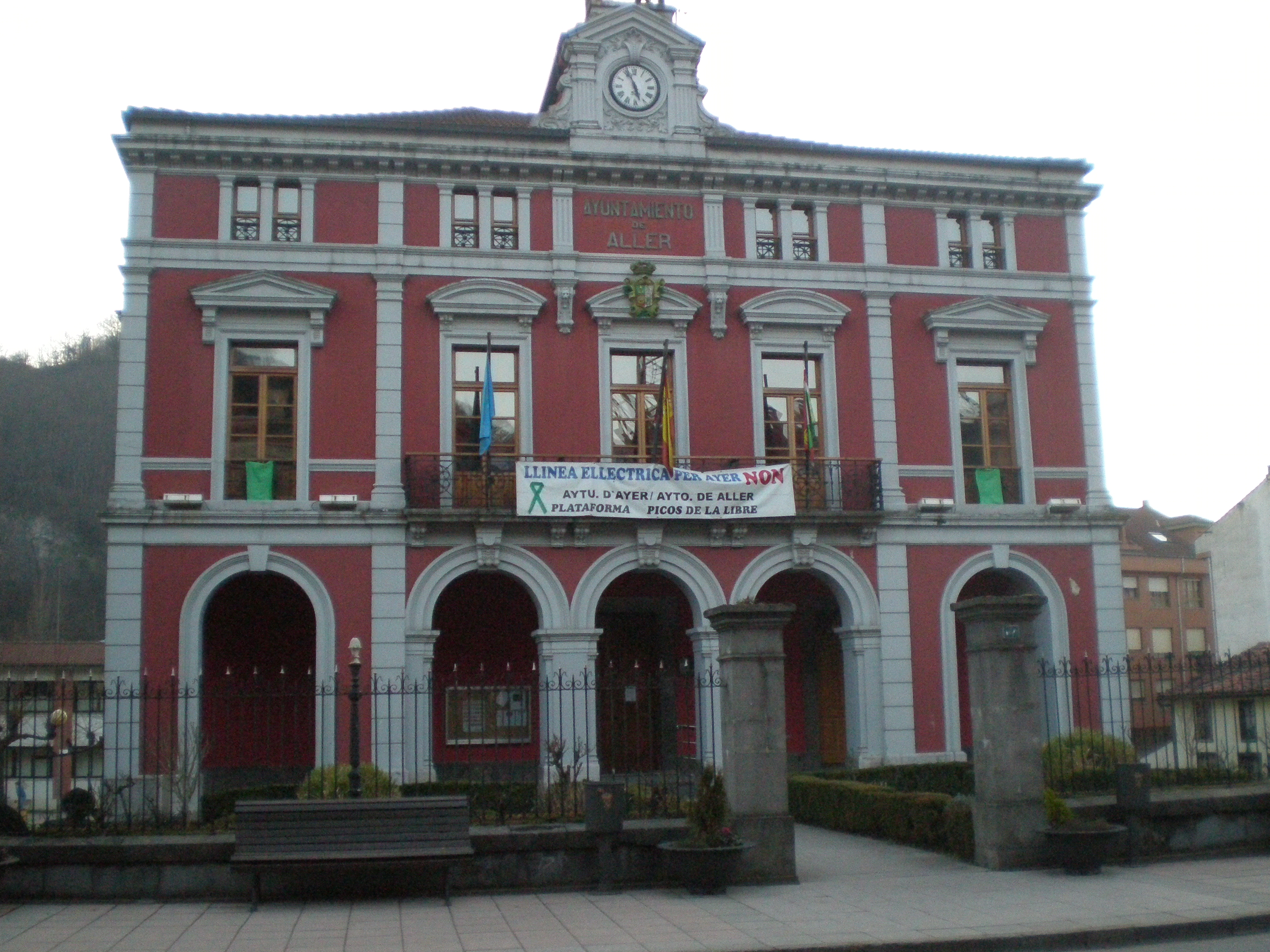
- Town Hall.

- Flag Coat of arms

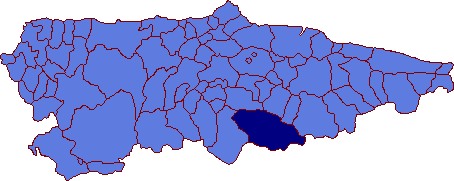

- Location in Spain
- Coordinates: 43°6′N 5°35′W
- Country: Spain
- Autonomous community: Asturias
- Province: Asturias
- Comarca: Caudal
- Judicial district: Lena
- Capital: Cabañaquinta

Government
  - Mayor: Gabriel Pérez Villalta (PSOE)

Area
  - Total: 375.89 km^{2} (145.13 sq mi)
- Highest elevation: 2,115 m (6,939 ft)

Population (2025-01-01)
  - Total: 10,011
  - Density: 26.633/km^{2} (68.979/sq mi)
- Demonym: Alleranos
- Time zone: UTC+1 (CET)
  - Summer (DST): UTC+2 (CEST)
- Postal code: 33686
- Website: Official website

Aller (Asturian: Ayer) is a municipality in the Autonomous Community of the Principality of Asturias, Spain. It is bordered on the north by Mieres, on the south by the province of León, on the east by Laviana, Caso, and Sobrescobio, and on the west by Lena.

== Geography ==
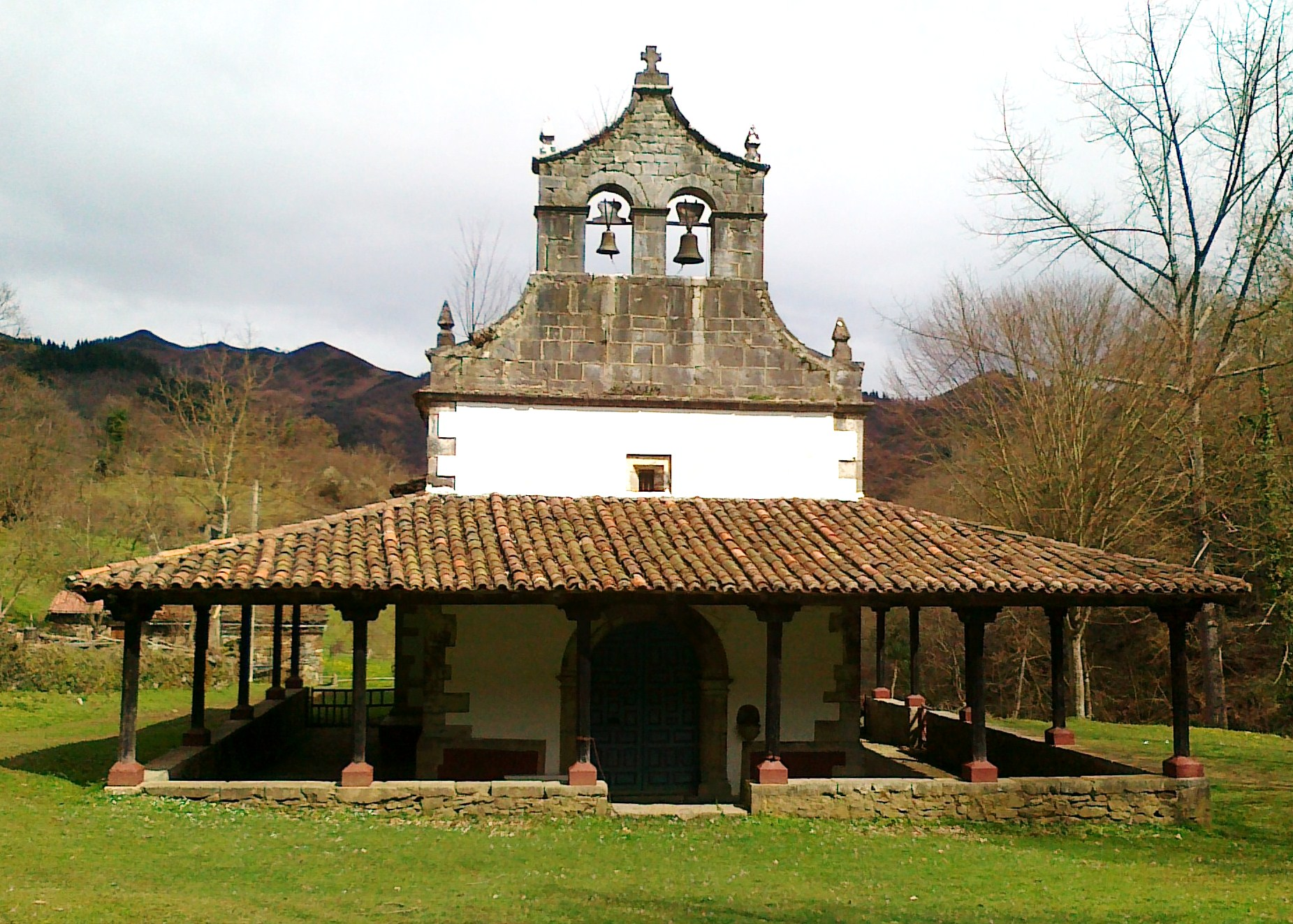
Marivalles Sanctuary

The municipality is crossed by the Aller River, which flows into the Caudal. Near the confluence, the Aller forms a deep valley between steep hillsides covered with forest. The municipality, along with those of Lena and Mieres, forms the coal-rich basin of the Caudal. The principal economic activity has been coal mining, especially in the lower part of the valley, while agriculture and ranching are also important. The towers of coal mines and the buildings of the mining communities dominate the landscape.

Upriver is the municipal capital, Cabañaquinta, in the direction of which the landscape gradually transforms into a high mountain valley, which culminates in the San Isidro Pass (1,520 m), which lies along the border with the province of León. The beauty of the area and the ski area located nearby has led to a great increase in tourism in recent years, distinguishing the locality of Felechosa, 13 km from the peak.

Among the natural attractions of the region are the ravines of the Pino and Aller rivers, huge gorges carved into the foot of the mountains. The municipality also offers a wide variety of routes that follow the paths of the traditional herdsmen from the villages at the foot of the mountains up the slopes. Peaks include the Torres (2,100 m), the Toneo, Peña Redonda, the Retriñón, and Peña Mea.

=== Parishes ===
- Bello
- Boo
- Cabañaquinta
- Caborana
- Casomera
- Conforcos
- Cuérigo
- El Pino
- Llamas
- Moreda
- Murias
- Nembra
- Pelúgano
- Piñeres
- Santibáñez de La Fuente
- Serrapio
- Soto
- Vega

== History ==
The first traces of human presence in the area date to the Neolithic and Iron Ages. Despite the excavation of a few Roman findings, the modern settlement dates probably from the 9th-10th centuries AD.

== Holidays ==
The most important holiday of the municipality is the Humanitarios de San Martín de Moreda, in which pilgrims wear the traditional Asturian clothing of San Antonio de Piñeras, on the last Sunday in August and the Pilgrimage of Miralles in Soto on September 8.

There are also several livestock festivals in Cabañaquinta, including one in March the Friday before Saint Joseph's Day, one in honor of the rosary the first Friday in October, and one in honor of Saint Andrew the third Friday of November.

== Politics ==
The current mayor is David Moreno Bobela (FSA-PSOE), in office 2011.

Local election results
Party/List	1979	1983	1987	1991	1995	1999	2003	2007	2011	2015
PSOE	8	11	9	8	10	10	8	7	7	6
PP	0	6	5	6	5	6	7	7	5	4
IU	2	2	2	1	1	1	2	3	3	3
FAC									2	2
XpA										1
AIPA										1
LA					1					
PAS-UNA				1						
CAI		2	3							
UCD/CDS	11	-	2	1						
Total	21	21	21	17	17	17	17	17	17	17

== Notable people ==
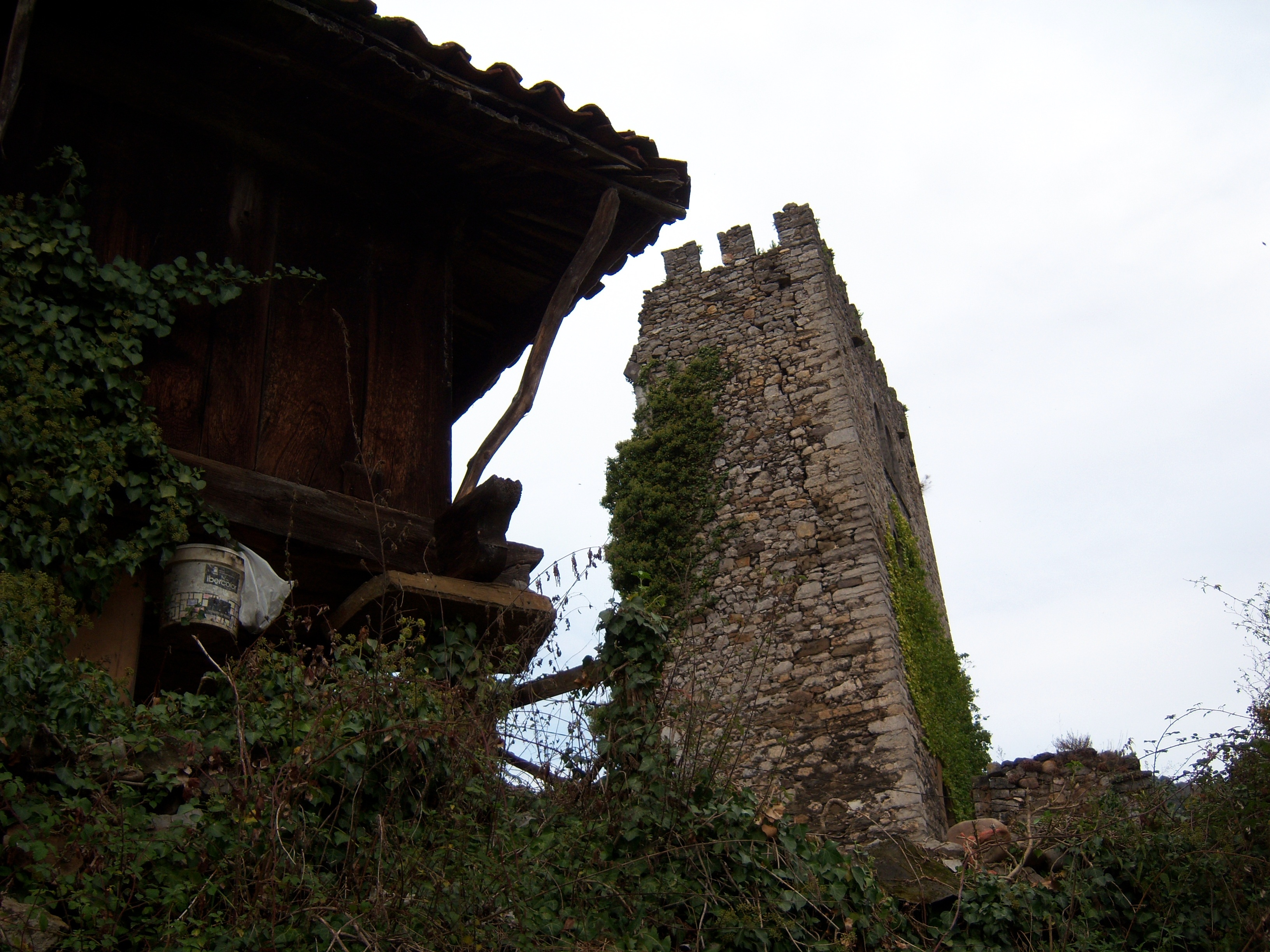
The Soto castle

- José Suárez (September 9, 1919 - August 6, 1981), movie actor
- José Campo Castañon (June 21, 1921 - May 16, 1992), poet and man of letters

== See also ==
- List of municipalities in Asturias
