= Aller (Asturian river) =

River in Asturias, Spain

Aller Ayer
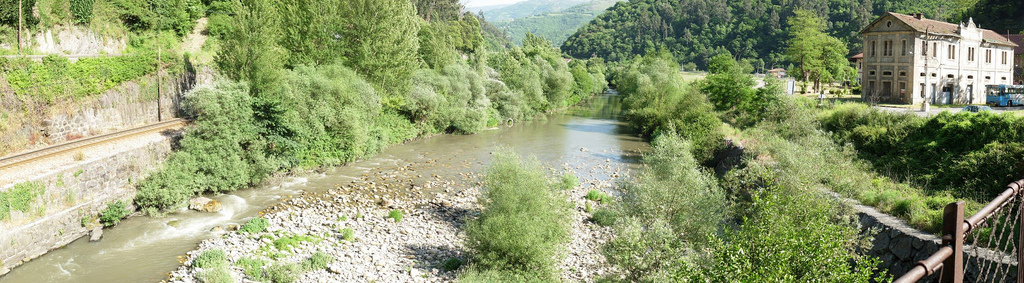
- The Aller river in Bustiello

Location
- Country: Spain
- State: Asturias

Physical characteristics
- Source: Cantabrian Mountains
- Mouth: Caudal
  - location: near Ujo, Asturias, Spain
  - coordinates: 43°12′0″N 5°47′0″W
- Length: 42 km (26 mi)
- Basin size: 280 km^{2} (110 sq mi)

The Aller is a river in northern Spain flowing through the Autonomous Community of Asturias.

It is 38.6 kilometres (24.0 mi) in length.

Its fauna includes the brown trout.

The main part of a thick succession of Pennsylvanian strata that contains workable coal seams in its upper part has an exposure in the Asturian Central Coal Basin, particularly in the areas around the Aller, Caudal, and Nalon rivers.

A fall on the river is a short distance from the coal mines of the Sociedad Hullera Española.

In 1891, a new coal-washing plant was established at the confluence of the Aller and Lena rivers, in Asturias. It was erected in connection with a coke oven plant and a briquette manufactory. It was on the Allard system, and consisted of seven jigging machines, which could wash 25 tons per hour, classifying the material washed into seven divisions. The briquette machine was of the Bourriez type.
