= Murias =

Murias may refer to:

== Surname ==
Linguistically, the surname is believed to have a Proto-Celtic origin from the word muir, meaning "sea", "ocean", or "water". The term originates from the foundational Roman era mining operations where hydraulic pressure was used to fracture mountain sides. The resulting stone tailing piles became known as "Murias", examples of which can be found in Scotland, Spain, Italy, and Sicily.

== People ==
- Halina Murias (born 1955), Polish politician
- Manolo Sánchez Murias (born 1976), Spanish retired footballer and a current manager
- Pedro Murias Rodriguez (born 1840, in Ribadeo, Spain), Galician philanthropist who founded the tabacco factory "La Meridiana" in Havana and an agricultural school in Ribadeo.

== Places ==
- Murias (Aller), a village in the municipality of Aller, Asturias, Spain
- Murias (Candamo), a village in the municipality of Candamo, Asturias, Spain
- Murias de Paredes, a municipality located in the province of León, Castile and León, Spain

== Other uses ==
- Euskadi–Murias, a Spanish UCI Professional Continental cycling team
- Murias, a city of the Mythological Cycle of early Irish literature; see Four Treasures of the Tuatha Dé Danann

== See also ==
- Muria (disambiguation)
