= Iglesia de San Félix (El Pino) =

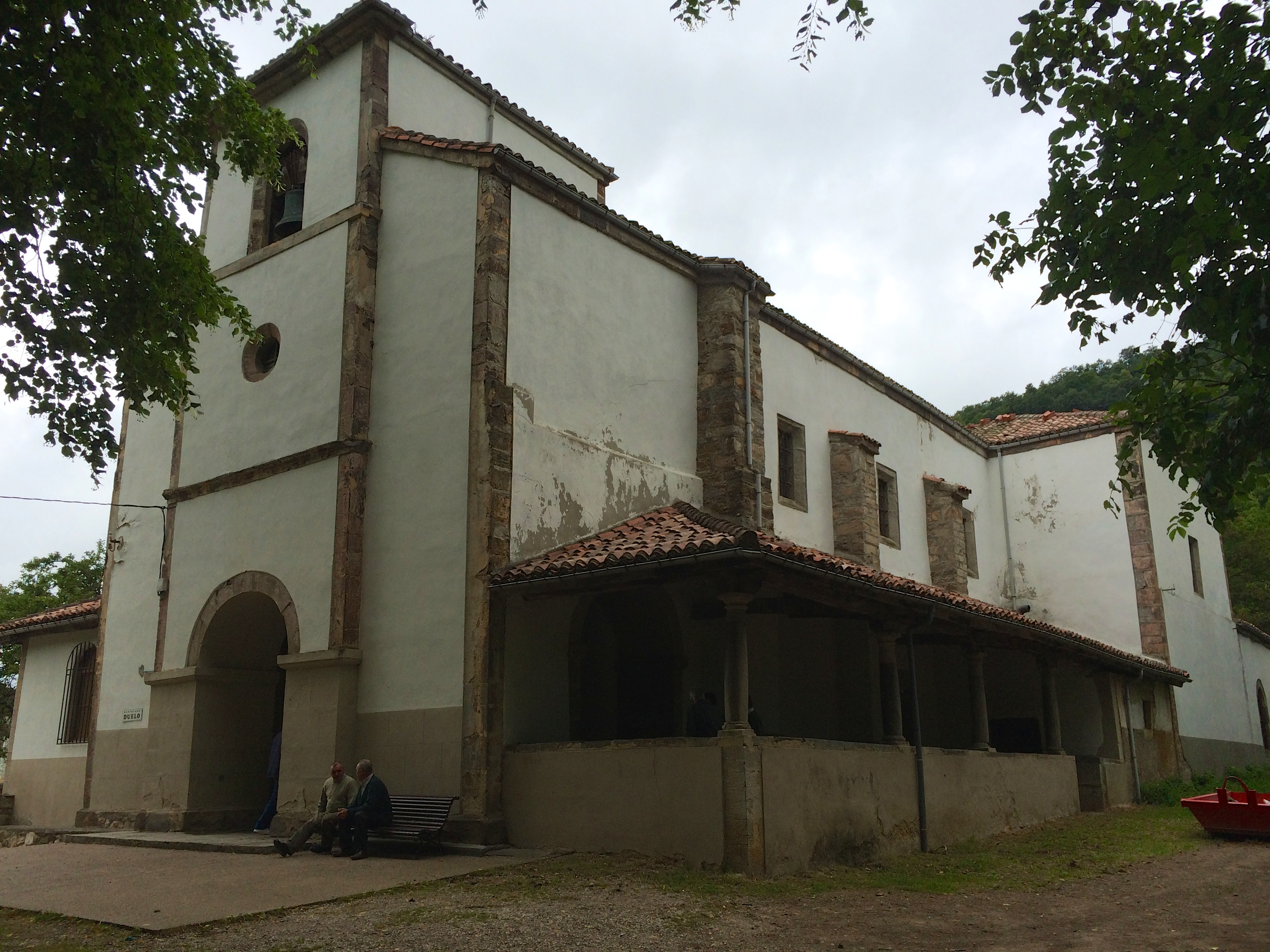
- Iglesia de San Félix
- 43.1092°N 5.5211°W
- Location: El Pino
- Country: Spain
- Denomination: Roman Catholic

History
- Founded: 1751

The Church of St. Felix (Spanish: Iglesia de San Félix) is located in the parish of El Pino in Asturias, Spain. It was established in 1751. It has been registered as a national monument in the register of Bien de Interés Cultural since 1973.

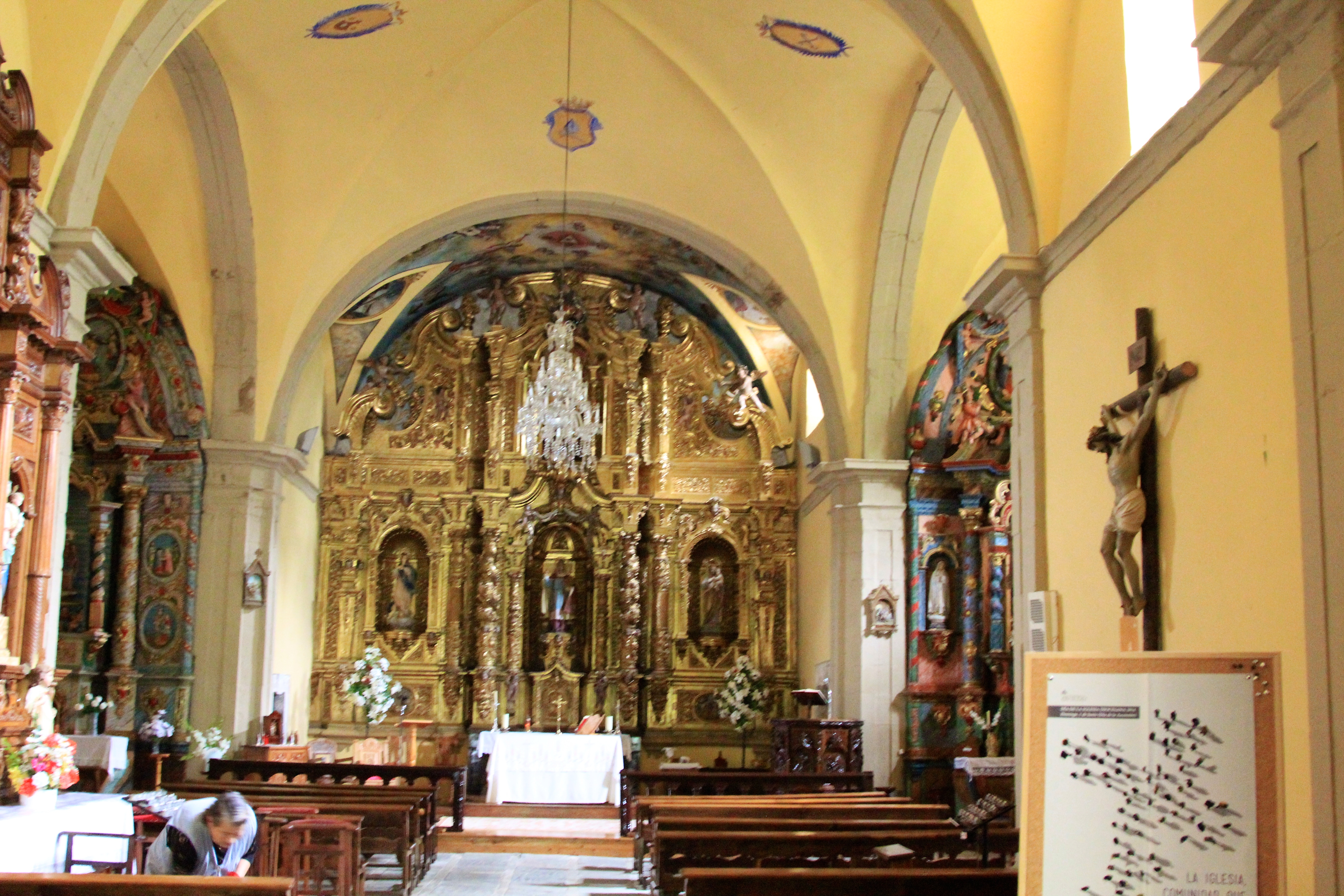
Interior

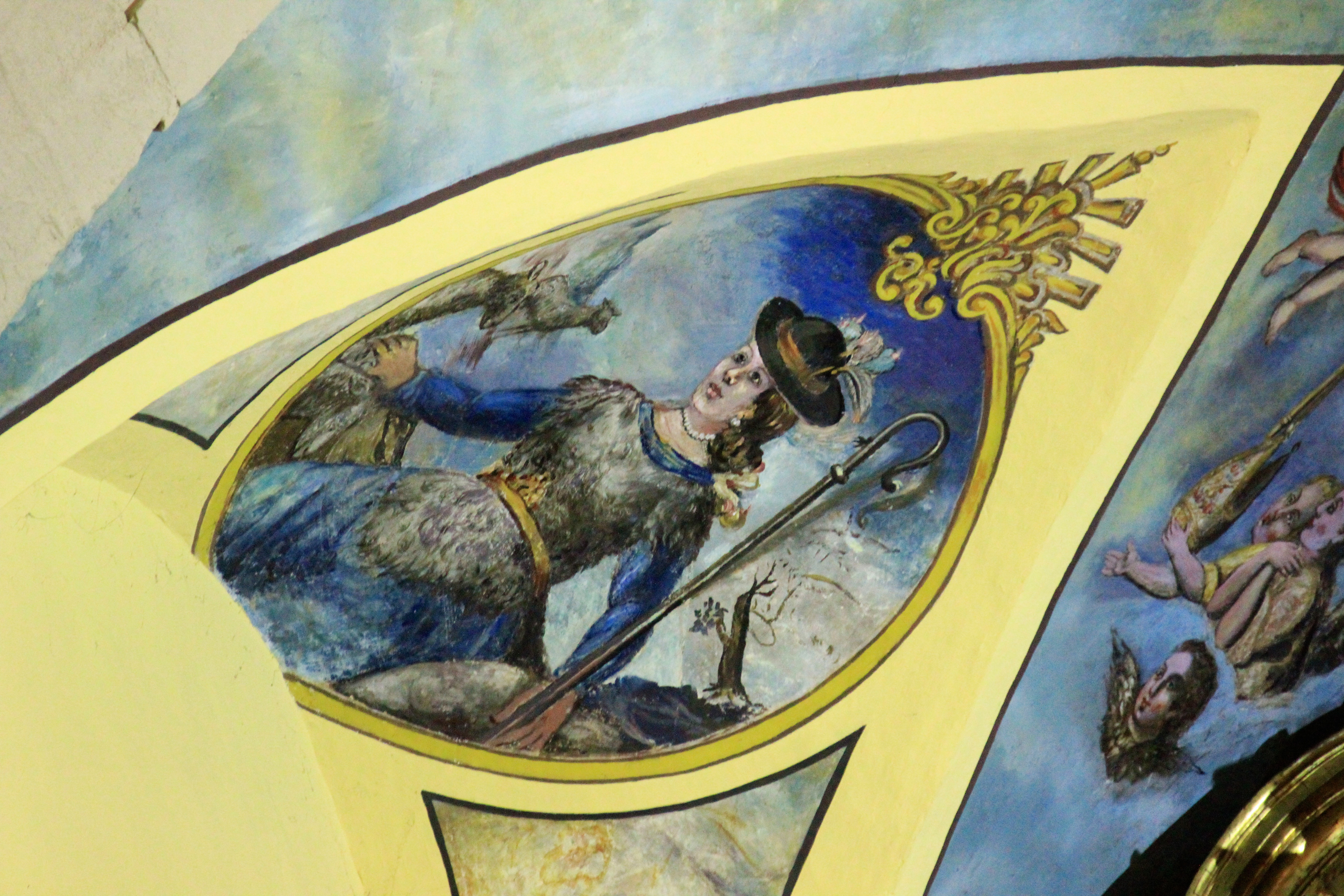
Pintura del techo in the church

== See also ==
- Asturian art
- Catholic Church in Spain
