= Conforcos =

Parish in Asturias, Spain

- Parish
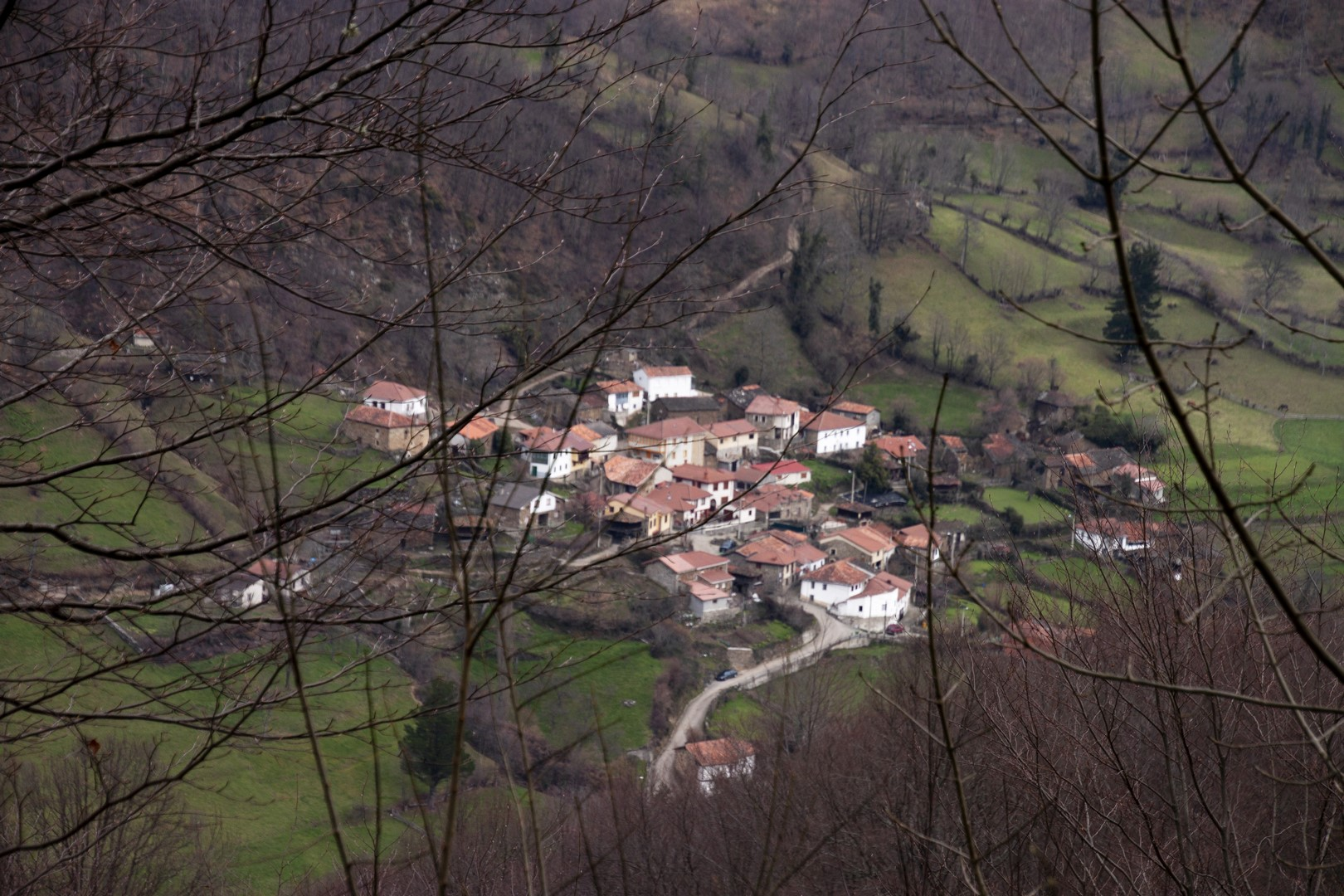

- Location within Spain
- Coordinates: 43.10973°N 5.58876°W
- Country: Spain
- Autonomous community: Asturias
- Province: Asturias
- Municipality: Aller

Area
  - Total: 8.9 km^{2} (3.4 sq mi)

Population (2024)
  - Total: 23
  - Density: 2.6/km^{2} (6.7/sq mi)
- Time zone: UTC+1 (CET)
  - Summer (DST): UTC+2 (CEST)

Conforcos is one of 18 parishes (administrative divisions) in Aller, a municipality within the province and autonomous community of Asturias, in northern Spain.

The altitude 775 m (2,543 ft) above sea level. It is 8.9 km^{2} (3.4 sq mi) in size with a population of 23 as of January 1, 2024.
