= Óscar Pérez Solís =

Spanish artillery officer, engineer, journalist and politician

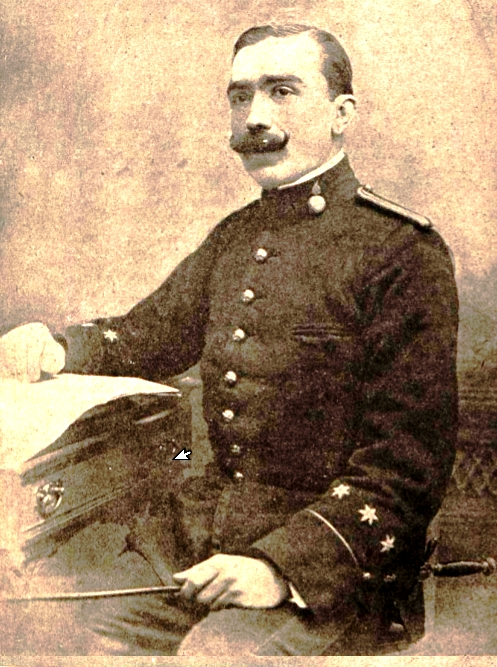
- Óscar Pérez Solís in 1912
- Born: 24 August 1882; Cabañaquinta, Asturias, Spain
- Died: 26 October 1951 (aged 69); Valladolid, Spain
- Occupations: Soldier, engineer, journalist
- Known for: Founding member of Spanish Communist Party

Óscar Pérez Solís (24 August 1882 – 26 October 1951) was a Spanish artillery officer, engineer, journalist and politician. He became attracted to left-wing causes, and left the army in 1912. He joined the Spanish Socialist Workers' Party and was its candidate in several general elections. In 1921 he was one of the founders of the Communist Party of Spain, and became secretary-general of the party. He converted to Catholicism during a period in prison in 1925–27. After being released he disavowed his left-wing beliefs and became associated with the right-wing Falangists.

== Early years (1882–1912) ==
Óscar Pérez Solís was born in Cabañaquinta, Asturias, on 24 August 1882. His father was a captain of the Marine Infantry, and took the family with him on postings to Ferrol, Galicia and then Valladolid. Oscar was expected to continue the military tradition. He graduated from secondary school in 1898 and entered the Artillery Academy in Segovia. He qualified as a mechanical engineer, and left the Academy in 1904 with the rank of lieutenant.

Pérez Solís served in the Gran Canaria artillery command in Las Palmas from 1904 to 1907. Juan Salvador, an anarchist soldier under his command in Las Palmas who died unexpectedly, introduced him to the Luz y Progreso (Light and Progress) anarchist movement. Pérez Solís was posted to Valladolid from 1908 to 1911. He joined the socialist Agrupación Socialista (AS) of Valladolid in 1910, and wrote for the socialist press using the pseudonym "Juan Salvador". In 1911 he was promoted to captain. He edited the socialist weekly Adelante de Valladolid under the pseudonym "Carlos Guerrero". With his socialist leanings known to his fellow-officers, he was advised to apply for a transfer to Cartagena. He ignored this, and instead asked to be assigned to the reserve in Madrid. He left the army after being reprimanded for being involved in an assault on a municipal councilor.

== Socialist (1912–1921) ==
Pérez Solís was discharged in June 1912. He was an AS representative in the 9th Congress of the Spanish Socialist Workers' Party (Partido Socialista Obrero Español, PSOE) in 1912, and in subsequent congresses in 1919, 1920 and 1921. He was the PSOE candidate for Valladolid in the general elections of 1914, 1916, 1918, 1919 and 1920. In 1915 he was elected deputy mayor of Valladolid. At first he was in the right wing of the PSOE. Pérez Solís supported the alliance with the Republicans during the early period of his membership of the PSOE. Later he began to criticize their anti-monarchy position, and the power of local party bosses such as Santiago Alba. During World War I (1914–18) Pérez Solís supported the Allies, but was not deeply involved in their cause, having little interest in international affairs.

On 8 March 1917 the Socialists of Valladolid declared a general strike in protest against the arrest of labor leaders a few days earlier. The strike did not gain support elsewhere in Spain, troops were brought in to control the demonstrations, and the strike ended after three days. Pérez Solís was blamed for the failure, although he was probably not responsible for starting the strike. He temporarily resigned and left the PSOE in April 1917, advocating the creation of an Independent Socialist Party. From 1917 Pérez Solís edited ¡Adelante!, the journal of the Valladolid socialists. After the general strike of 1917 he spent a few months in Lisbon before returning to Valladolid. Francisco Largo Caballero said afterwards that the general strike in August had failed in part because the earlier attempt in Valladolid had drained energy from the movement.

In 1917 Pérez Solís began writing articles for the national paper España. Pérez Solís rejoined the PSOE in 1918, and ran on the PSOE ticket in the 1918 general elections. By the spring of 1918 Pérez Solís was emerging as a leading figure in national politics. He was an effective speaker who appealed to the masses, but was moderate, supported the monarchy and was not sectarian. In early autumn of 1918 El Sol started to publish strongly worded articles by Pérez Solís. He said the Socialist Party had started down the wrong track in 1909 when it started to support a republic in place of the monarchy, and a revolution to achieve that aim. He felt the a revolution would cause chaos and counter-revolution, and a republic would not have the support of the military, the middle classes or the working people. While chasing these unobtainable goals, the socialists had fail to obtain the social reform that Spain urgently needed, particularly agricultural reform and removal of all obstacles to the "full flowering of industrial capital."

Pérez Solís was elected provincial deputy for Valladolid in 1919. At the 1919 PSOE congress in Madrid he took a position in favor of the Socialist International and against the Russian Revolution. In 1920 he was accused of libel against Santiago Alba and exiled to the Basque Country. There he tried to find a position within the Basque labor movement, but would soon be affected by the mood of the region and start to move towards the far left. This had not yet happened when he attended the 1920 PSOE congress. There he said that the time was not ripe for revolution. He spoke in favor of the Second International, and criticized the Bolsheviks in Russia, who he said by no means represented the whole of the Russian Revolution. Not long after he became involved with Communist International circles and began to participate in militant activism. He was arrested, and held in the Larrinaga prison until March 1921.

== Communist (1921–1927) ==
Pérez Solís attended the PSOE congress of 9–13 April 1921 in Madrid as representative from Bilbao, where he advocated the PSOE joining the Communist International. A vote on the subject found 8,808 in favor of adhering to the Vienna International and 6,025 in favor of joining the Comintern. Most of the leftist members thought at first they should stay with the PSOE, but Pérez Solís and Manuel Núñez de Arenas organized a split of the party. Pérez Solís read the manifesto of the new organization, the Spanish Communist Workers' Party (Partido Comunista Obrero Español, PCOE). Soon after, following instructions from Moscow, the PCOE was united with the Partido Comunista (PC) to form the Communist Party of Spain (Partido Comunista de España, PCE). Pérez Solís was made editor of the party's journal La Bandera Roja (The Red Flag).

In the Basque Country there was a struggle between the socialists led by Indalecio Prieto and the communists led by Pérez Solís. Later Pérez Solís wrote that the eventual failure of the communists in the region was due in part to lack of leadership and in part to an excess of young men who wanted direct action, who often called poorly timed and violent strikes with unrealistic demands. This scared away potential recruits and helped the socialists to win back members. Pérez Solís attended the XV congress of the Unión General de Trabajadores (UGT) in 1922 as representative of the farm workers of Bilbao. In 1922 his guard included the young Jesús Hernández Tomás (1907–1971).

Pérez Solís was a PCE candidate for Madrid in the April 1923 general elections. At the PCE congress in Madrid on 8 July 1923 Pérez Solís was made a member of the Central Committee. He and César González were both nominated for general secretary, but Pérez Solís refused. González was given the job, although Pérez Solís had emerged as the leading figure in the party. Pérez Solís was the author of the main resolution proposed to the congress, on "The immediate political tasks of the Party." The main task was the struggle against the military dictatorship that was expected to soon be established. In August 1923 Pérez Solís tried to start a general strike in Bilbao at the same time as a rebellion by Basque troops who were being shipped from Málaga to Morocco. This may have pushed the army into speeding up their plans.

Pérez Solís continued his propaganda activity in Spain during the dictatorship of General Miguel Primo de Rivera that began in September 1923, and contributed to La Antorcha, the organ of the Spanish section of the Third International, published in Madrid. He wrote several articles that favored the Confederación Nacional del Trabajo (CNT), at that time pro-Marxist but later anarcho-syndicalist. He was seriously injured on 23 August 1923 when assault guards entered the Bilbao Peoples House during a general strike called by the local communists. He was arrested on charges of being involved in violent protests against the shipment of troops to Morocco, and for an attempt to bomb the socialist newspaper El Liberal and its ideologue Indalecio Prieto. At that time his sister arranged for him to meet the Jesuit priest Luis Chalbaud, a first step in a major change to his religious and political beliefs.

After completing his sentence in January 1924 Pérez Solís expected to be put on trial again in Valladolid. To avoid this he left the country for France, and then represented the Spanish at the Comintern congress in Moscow. He returned to Paris, then returned to Spain after an amnesty late in the year. The PCE continued to decline, and most of its leaders were arrested. Pérez Solís became PCE secretary-general with the support of José Bullejos and Gabriel León Trilla. On 13 February 1925 he too was arrested in Barcelona. While in jail he was visited several times by the Dominican José Gafo Muñiz, a leader of Social Catholicism, and exchanged many letters with Father Gafo.

== Falangist (1927–51) ==
When Pérez Solís was released on 9 August 1927 he had made a basic shift in his beliefs. Saying he needed to recover his health, he moved to Valladolid and withdrew from politics. In the autumn there were rumors, later confirmed, that he had left the Communist Party, had again become a Catholic, and had accepted a management position in a major new company, the Compañía Arrendataria del Monopolio de Petróleos (CAMPSA). It was said that Pérez Solís was familiar with oil business because of secret arrangements for supply of Russian oil to Spain during the dictatorship. In March 1928 El Debate published a letter in which he renounced his former ideology. He became head of CAMPSA in Santander in June 1928.

At first Pérez Solís openly supported the Catholic labor unions inspired by Father Gafo. He was transferred to Valladolid, where he edited the Diario Regional and contributed to reactionary newspapers such as El Pensamiento Navarro, El Debate and Acción Española. He became close to the Spanish Falange and its founder José Antonio Primo de Rivera. In 1933 he joined the Falange.

During the revolt of 18 July 1936 at the start of the Spanish Civil War (1936–39) Pérez Solís played a leading role for the Nationalist rebels. He was arrested in Oviedo and imprisoned. After 48 hours he was released when the garrison rose in favor of the Nationalists, and joined the defense of the city against the Republicans as a captain under the command of Colonel Antonio Aranda. During the Siege of Oviedo he published various anti-communist articles in the daily paper Región.

Under the dictatorship of Francisco Franco he was appointed Civil Governor of Valladolid.

Óscar Pérez Solís died in Valladolid on 26 October 1951.

== Publications ==
Óscar Pérez Solís wrote numerous articles. His books include:

- Óscar Pérez Solís (1918). El partido socialista y la acción de las izquierdas (in Spanish).
- Óscar Pérez Solís (1923). Cartas a un anarquista : [por un comunista] (in Spanish). Madrid: Biblioteca internazionale.
- Josep Maria Vilà; Óscar Pérez Solís [preface] (1926). Los soviets (in Spanish). Barcelona: L'Estampa. p. 285.
- Óscar Pérez Solís (1929). Memorias de mi amigo Oscar Perea (in Spanish). Madrid: Renacimiento.
- Luis de Andrés y Morera; Óscar Pérez Solís [prolog] (1929). La antorcha rusa (in Spanish) (2 ed.). Madrid: Huelves y Compañía. p. 268.
- Óscar Pérez Solís (1930). A propósito de un folleto : trayectoria de la Confederación Nacional del Trabajo (in Spanish). Madrid: Biblioteca Internacional. p. 149. OCLC 432965233.
- Óscar Pérez Solís; General Antonio Aranda [prolog] (1937). Sitio y defensa de Oviedo (in Spanish). Valladolid: Artes gráficas Afrodisio Aguado.
- Óscar Pérez Solís (1947). Macias Picavea Lecciones de 1898 (in Spanish). Imprenta Castellana Valladolid. p. 188. ASIN B00CL9R1JG.

== Sources ==
- Alba, Víctor (1983-01-01). The Communist Party in Spain. Transaction Publishers. ISBN 978-1-4128-1999-2.
- "Jesús Hernández Tomás". Fuenterrebollo.
- "La peripecia de Oscar Pérez Solís". La Nueva España (in Spanish). Editorial Prensa Ibérica. 2010-12-28.
- Meaker, Gerald H. (1974). The Revolutionary Left in Spain, 1914-1923. Stanford University Press. ISBN 978-0-8047-0845-6.
- "Pérez Solís, Óscar". Fundación Pablo Iglesias. 23 February 2012.
