= El Pino (Aller) =

- Parish
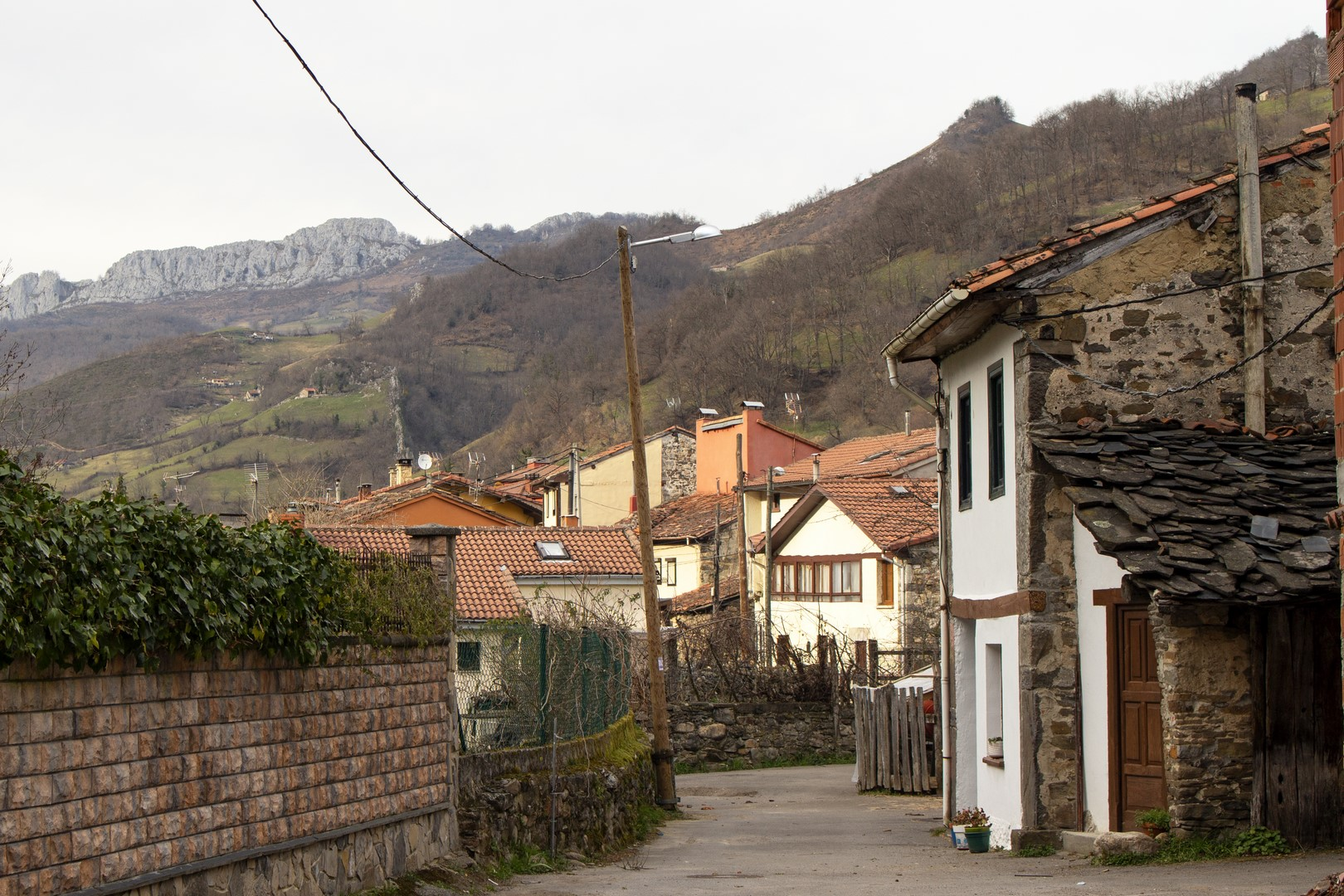

- Location within Spain
- Coordinates: 43.10708°N 5.5189°W
- Country: Spain
- Autonomous community: Asturias
- Province: Asturias
- Municipality: Aller

Area
  - Total: 87.89 km^{2} (33.93 sq mi)

Population (2024)
  - Total: 755
  - Density: 8.59/km^{2} (22.2/sq mi)
- Time zone: UTC+1 (CET)
  - Summer (DST): UTC+2 (CEST)

El Pino is one of 18 parishes in Aller, a municipality within the province and autonomous community of Asturias, in northern Spain.

The altitude is 660 m (2,170 ft) above sea level. It is 87.89 km^{2} (33.93 sq mi) in size with a population of 755 as of January 1, 2024.

== Villages ==
- Los Coḷḷaínos
- Cuevas
- Felechosa
- El Fielato
- El Pino
- La Pola Vieya / Pola del Pino
- La Raya (Spanish Puerto San Isidro)
- Roseco
- Rufrío

== See also ==
- Church of St. Felix, El Pino
