= Cuergo =

Cuergo Cuérigo
- Parish
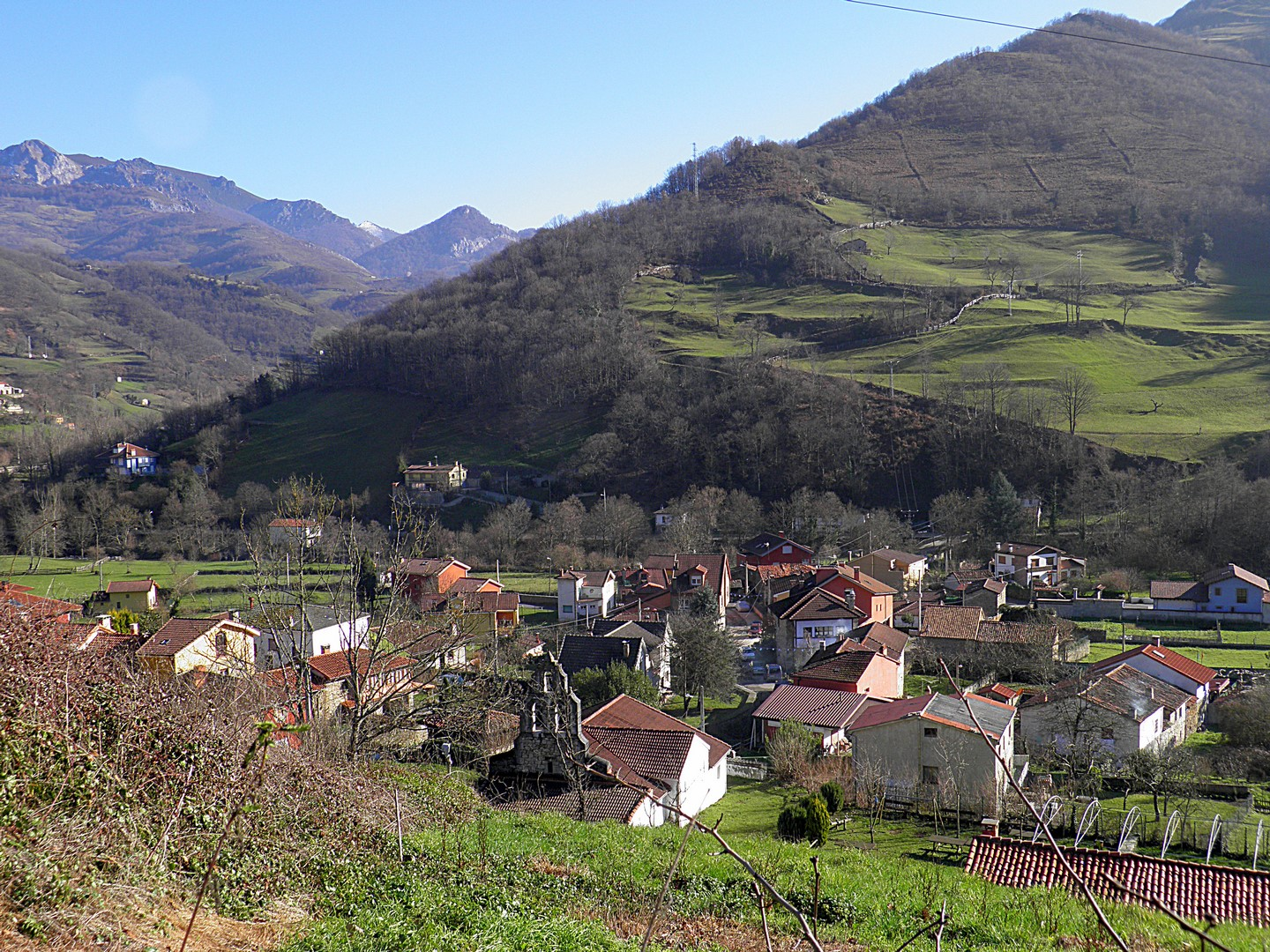

- Location within Spain
- Coordinates: 43.11966°N 5.5667°W
- Country: Spain
- Autonomous community: Asturias
- Province: Asturias
- Municipality: Aller

Area
  - Total: 3.9 km^{2} (1.5 sq mi)

Population (2024)
  - Total: 60
  - Density: 15/km^{2} (40/sq mi)
- Time zone: UTC+1 (CET)
  - Summer (DST): UTC+2 (CEST)

Cuergo (Spanish: Cuérigo) is one of 18 parishes in Aller, a municipality within the province and autonomous community of Asturias, in northern Spain.

The altitude 535 m (1,755 ft) above sea level. It is 3.9 km^{2} (1.5 sq mi) in size with a population of 60 as of January 1, 2024.

== Villages and hamlets ==
- La Barraca
- El Fabarín
- La Fragua
- El Quentu
- Valdeberruga
