= Casomera =

Parish in Asturias, Spain

- Parish
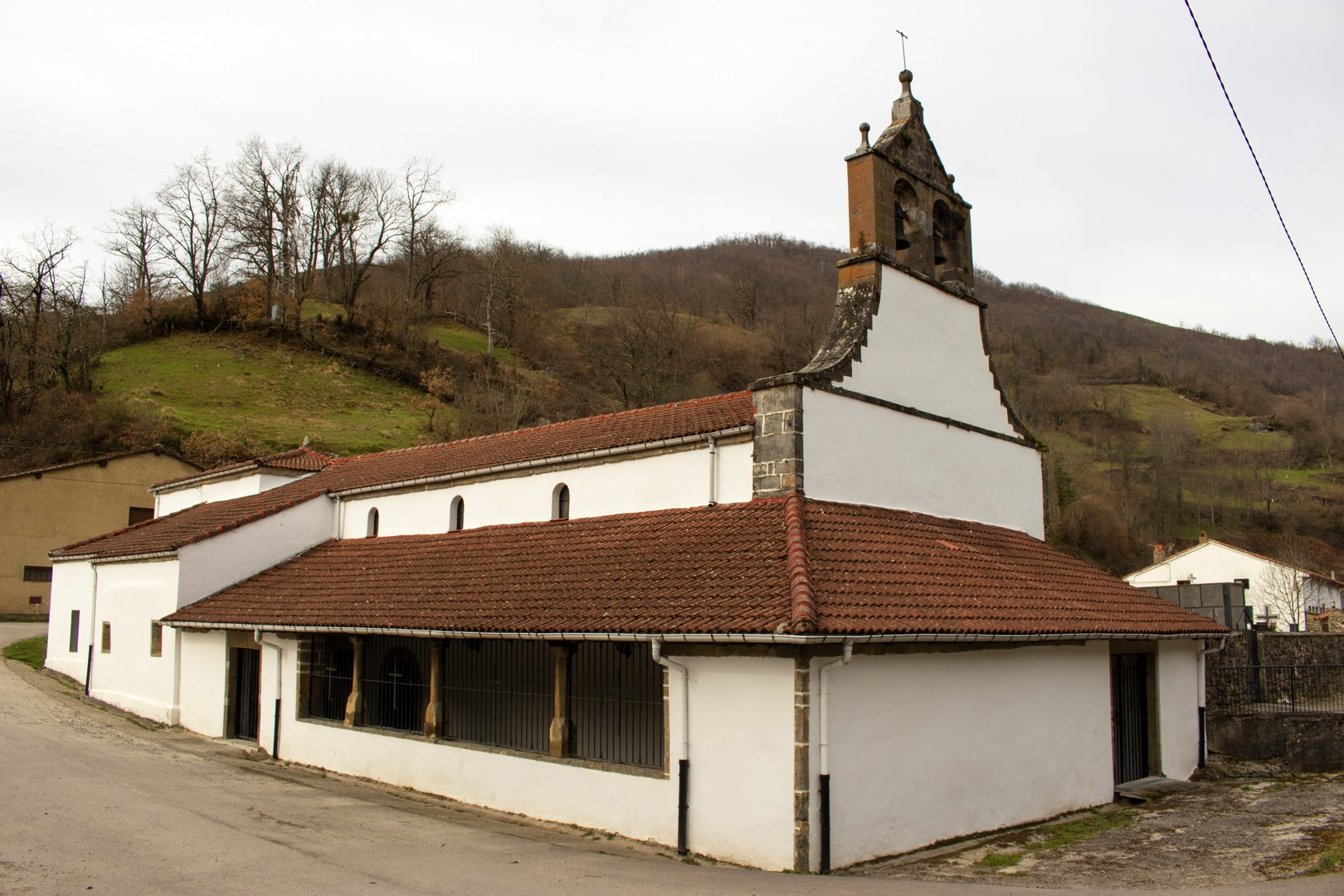

- Location within Spain
- Coordinates: 43.08216°N 5.57706°W
- Country: Spain
- Autonomous community: Asturias
- Province: Asturias
- Municipality: Aller

Area
  - Total: 67.59 km^{2} (26.10 sq mi)

Population (2024)
  - Total: 130
  - Density: 1.9/km^{2} (5.0/sq mi)
- Time zone: UTC+1 (CET)
  - Summer (DST): UTC+2 (CEST)

Casomera is one of 18 parishes (administrative divisions) in Aller, a municipality within the province and autonomous community of Asturias, in northern Spain.

The altitude 625 m (2,051 ft) above sea level. It is 67.59 km^{2} (26.10 sq mi) in size with a population of 130 as of January 1, 2024.

== Villages ==
- El Vao
- El Casarón
- Casomera
- Cuḷḷá las Piedras
- Felgueras
- Foceya
- El Goxal
- L'Intrueyo
- La Moradieḷḷa
- Los Morriondos
- Ruayer
- Rumañón
- La Paraya
- Vescayana
- Viḷḷar
- Yananzanes
