= Piñeres =

- Parish
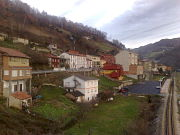

- Location within Spain
- Coordinates: 43.16994°N 5.67903°W
- Country: Spain
- Autonomous community: Asturias
- Province: Asturias
- Municipality: Aller

Area
  - Total: 16.1 km^{2} (6.2 sq mi)

Population (2024)
  - Total: 561
  - Density: 34.8/km^{2} (90.2/sq mi)
- Time zone: UTC+1 (CET)
  - Summer (DST): UTC+2 (CEST)

Piñeres is one of 18 parishes in Aller, a municipality within the province and autonomous community of Asturias, in northern Spain.

It is 16.1 km^{2} (6.2 sq mi) in size with a population of 561 as of January 1, 2024.

The villages include: Arteos, Las Barrosas, Bello, La Biesca, El Cabanon, Cambrosio, La Cantera, Carrocera, Casares, La Casillina, Castandiello, Castiello, Corigos, La Cortina, Cubrenes, El Escobio, Fresnaza, El Lagar, Llameres, Longalendo, Misiegos, Murias, El Palacio, El Pandiello, Perea, Pineo, La Provía, El Pueblu, Rucastiello, La Roza, San Antonio, La Sierra, Las Tercias, Valdediós, Vegalatorre, Veguellina, La Venta and Villar.
