= Nembra =

- Parish
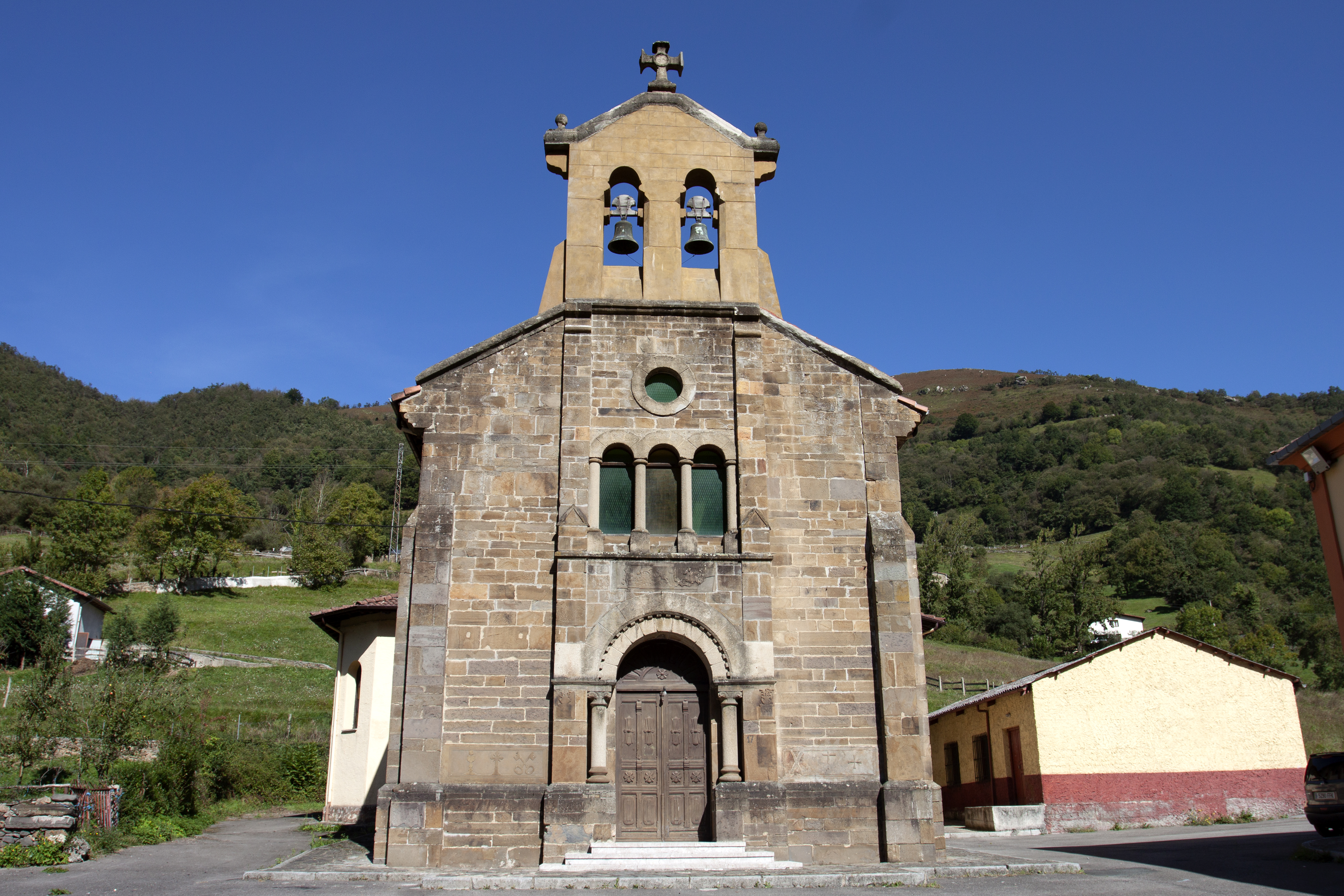

- Location within Spain
- Coordinates: 43.14825°N 5.70593°W
- Country: Spain
- Autonomous community: Asturias
- Province: Asturias
- Municipality: Aller

Area
  - Total: 22.2 km^{2} (8.6 sq mi)

Population (2024)
  - Total: 284
  - Density: 12.8/km^{2} (33.1/sq mi)
- Time zone: UTC+1 (CET)
  - Summer (DST): UTC+2 (CEST)

Nembra is one of 18 parishes in Aller, a municipality within the province and autonomous community of Asturias, in northern Spain.

The altitude 410 m (1,350 ft) above sea level. It is 22.2 km^{2} (8.6 sq mi) in size with a population of 284 as of January 1, 2024.

== Villages ==
- Arnizo
- El Cabanón
- Cao
- La Campueta
- La Carrera
- La Corralá
- Los Eros
- La Fistieḷḷa
- Fresnadieḷḷo
- Les Fureres
- Güertomuro
- L'Omeal
- Perasente
- El Pasaúriu
- Pumardongo
- Ruea
- Samiguel
- Los Tornos
