= Santibanes de la Fuente =

Santibanes de la Fuente Santibáñez de la Fuente
- Parish
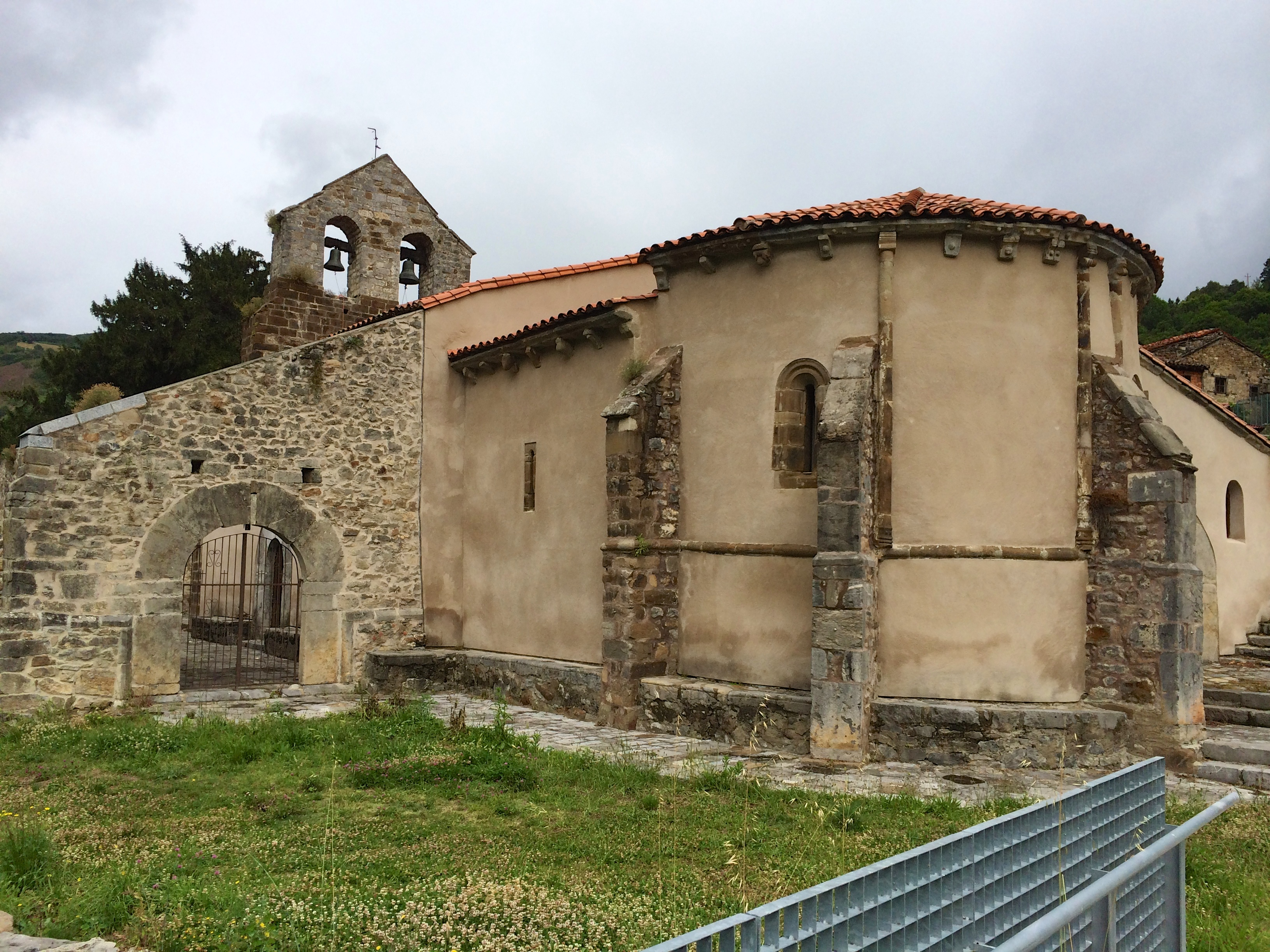

- Location within Spain
- Coordinates: 43.1236°N 5.560°W
- Country: Spain
- Autonomous community: Asturias
- Province: Asturias
- Municipality: Aller

Area
  - Total: 10.3 km^{2} (4.0 sq mi)

Population (2024)
  - Total: 357
  - Density: 34.7/km^{2} (89.8/sq mi)
- Time zone: UTC+1 (CET)
  - Summer (DST): UTC+2 (CEST)

Santibanes de la Fuente (Spanish: Santibáñez de la Fuente) is one of 18 parishes in Aller, a municipality within the province and autonomous community of Asturias, in northern Spain.

The altitude is 575 m (1,886 ft) above sea level. It is 10.3 km^{2} (4.0 sq mi) in size with a population of 357 as of January 1, 2024.

== Villages ==
- La Casa la Vega
- Coḷḷanzo
- La Fuente
- Santibanes de la Fuente
- Valdevenero
- Yanos
