= Serrapio =

- Parish
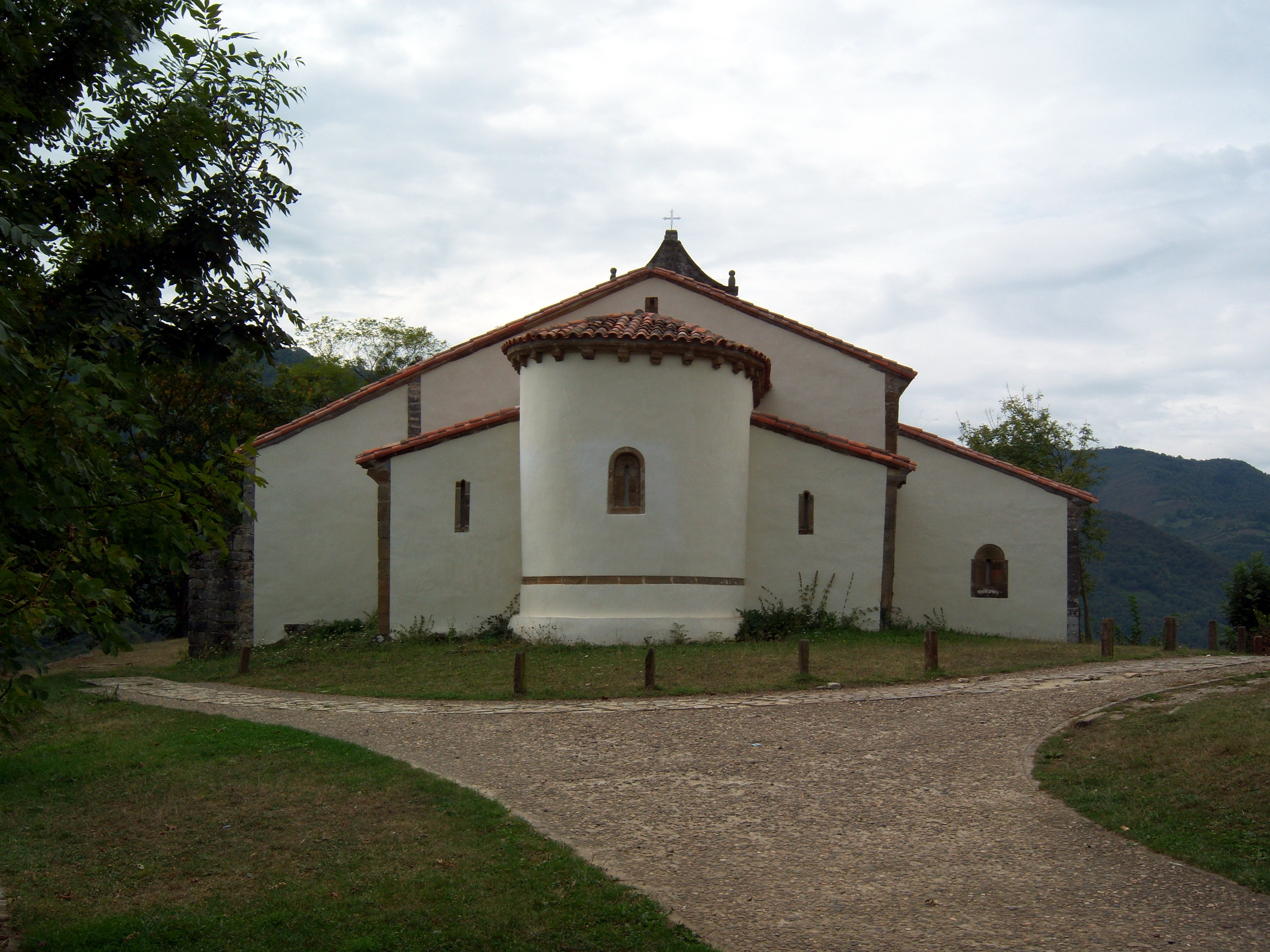

- Location within Spain
- Coordinates: 43.167778°N 5.631111°W
- Country: Spain
- Autonomous community: Asturias
- Province: Asturias
- Municipality: Aller

Area
  - Total: 13.09 km^{2} (5.05 sq mi)

Population (2024)
  - Total: 133
  - Density: 10.2/km^{2} (26.3/sq mi)
- Time zone: UTC+1 (CET)
  - Summer (DST): UTC+2 (CEST)

Serrapio is one of 18 parishes in Aller, a municipality within the province and autonomous community of Asturias, in northern Spain.

The altitude is 380 m (1,250 ft) above sea level. It is 13.09 km^{2} (5.05 sq mi) in size with a population of 133 as of January 1, 2024.

The main towns are Serrapio, Uries, El Casar, as well as the smaller villages of El Pedregal and La Casa Baxo. El Corazal, Los Praos, Rozadiella, Tablizo, Barreo, Les Quintanes, Cotzrexu, Bustianes, La Guariza and Riafarta are mostly uninhabited.

The Gabinete de Antigüedades ("Antiquities Cabinet") has oversight over the Iglesia de San Vicente de Serrapio.
