= Beyo =

Parish in Asturias, Spain

Beyo Bello
- Parish
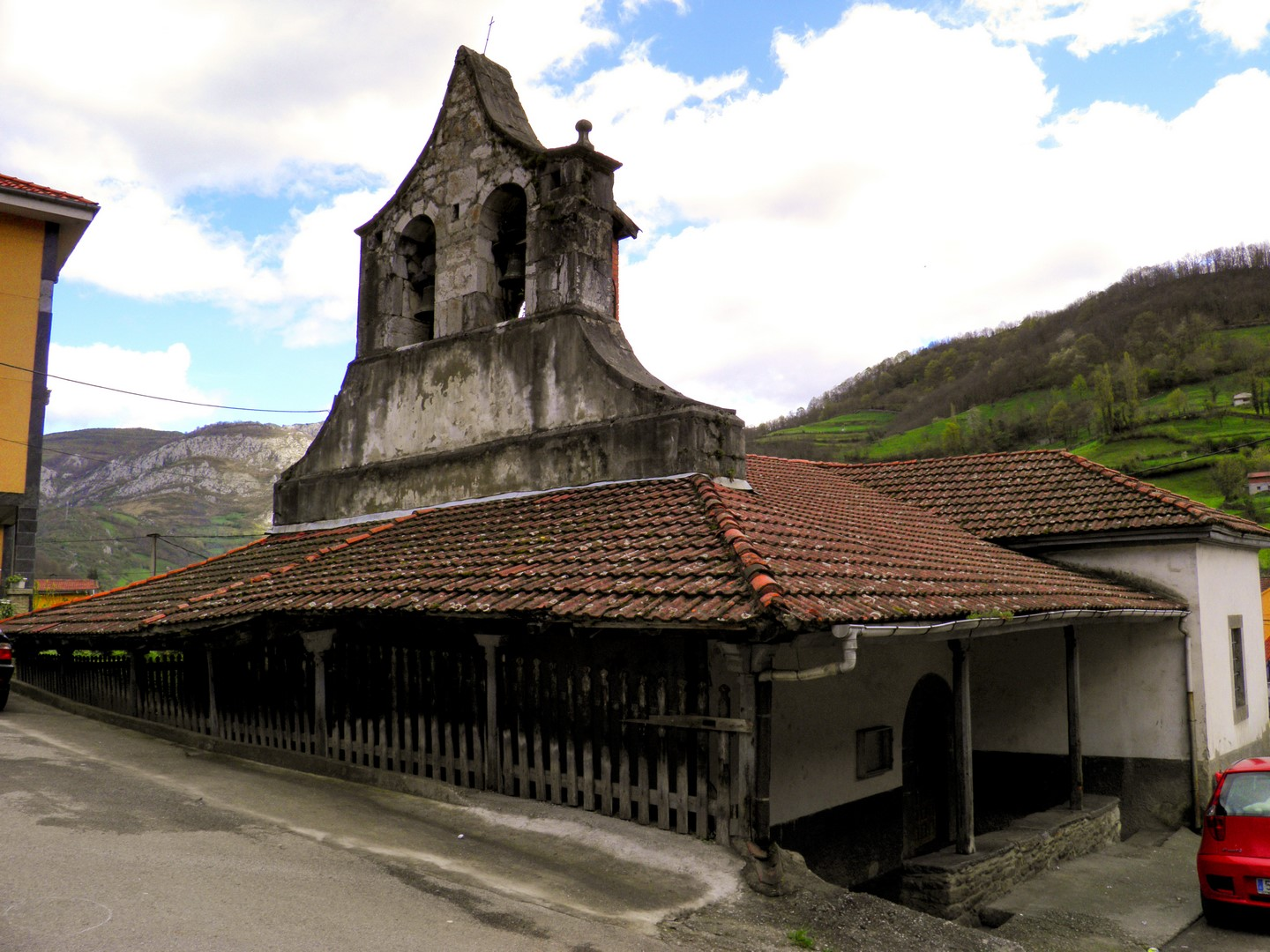

- Location within Spain
- Coordinates: 43.14119°N 5.60999°W
- Country: Spain
- Autonomous community: Asturias
- Province: Asturias
- Municipality: Aller

Area
  - Total: 16.2 km^{2} (6.3 sq mi)

Population (2024)
  - Total: 229
  - Density: 14.1/km^{2} (36.6/sq mi)
- Time zone: UTC+1 (CET)
  - Summer (DST): UTC+2 (CEST)

Beyo (Spanish: Bello) is one of 18 parish (administrative division) in Aller, a municipality within the province and autonomous community of Asturias, in northern Spain.

It is 16.2 km^{2} (6.3 sq mi) in size with a population of 229 as of January 1, 2024.

== Villages and hamlets ==
- Ferguerúa
- Maravidí
- Pando
- Riarría
- Vaḷḷina
