= Muria =

Muria may refer to:

- Muria people, a Gondi tribal people of India
  - Muria language, their Gondi (Dravidian) language
- Muria, Bihar, a village in India
- Mount Muria, a dormant volcano in Indonesia
- Muria Strait

== See also ==
- Murias (disambiguation)
