= Ḷḷamas =

Ḷḷamas Llamas
- Parish
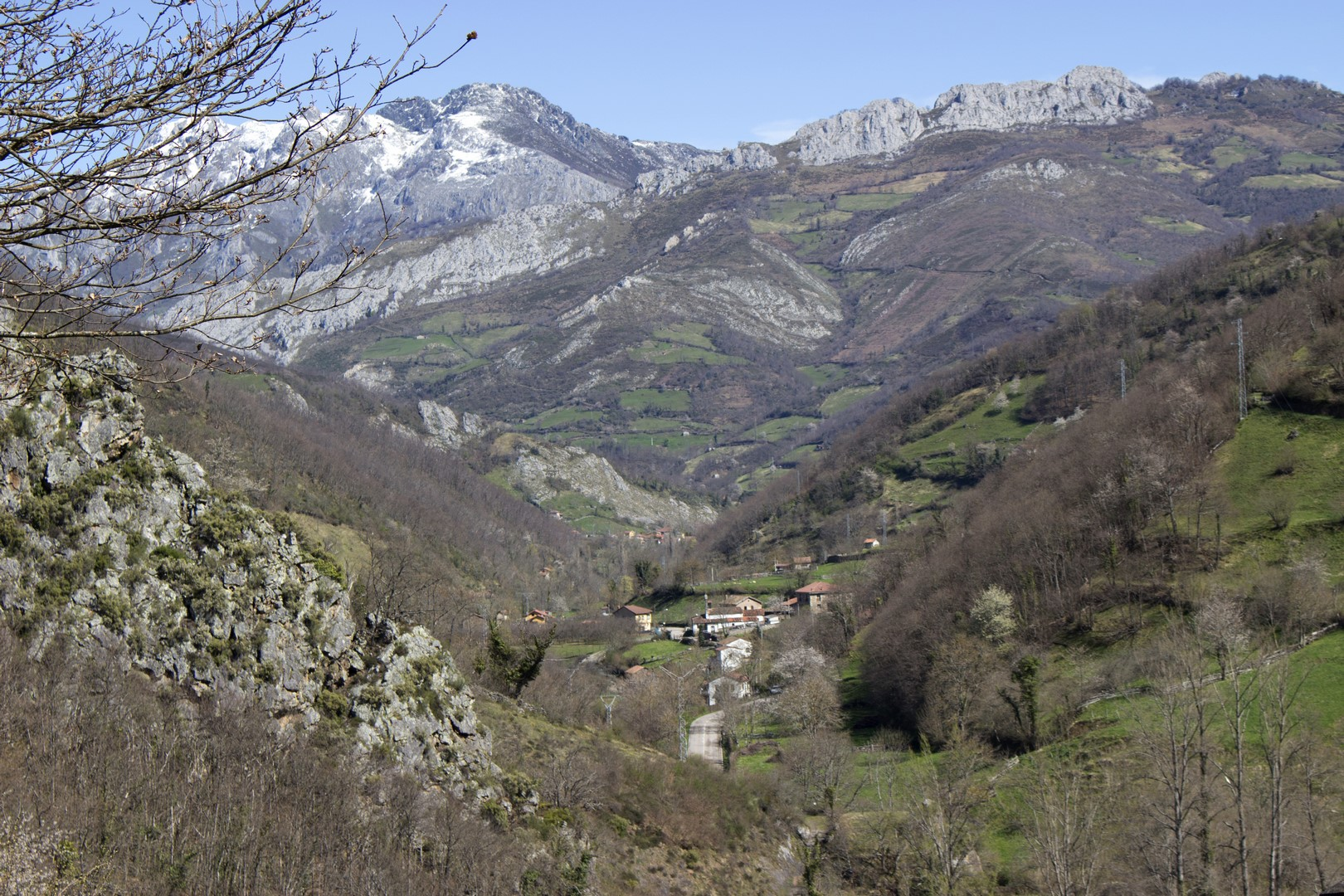

- Location within Spain
- Coordinates: 43.10559°N 5.57518°W
- Country: Spain
- Autonomous community: Asturias
- Province: Asturias
- Municipality: Aller

Area
  - Total: 7.0 km^{2} (2.7 sq mi)

Population (2024)
  - Total: 69
  - Density: 9.9/km^{2} (26/sq mi)
- Time zone: UTC+1 (CET)
  - Summer (DST): UTC+2 (CEST)

Ḷḷamas (Spanish: Llamas) is one of 18 parishes in Aller, a municipality within the province and autonomous community of Asturias, in northern Spain.

The altitude 670 m (2,200 ft) above sea level. It is 7 km^{2} (2.7 sq mi) in size with a population of 69 as of January 1, 2024.

== Villages ==
- Cima la Viḷḷa
- Casqueyu
- Reboḷḷal
- La Plaza
- La Venta
- Carpienzo
- Cortadiḷḷu
