= Soto (Aller) =

- Parish
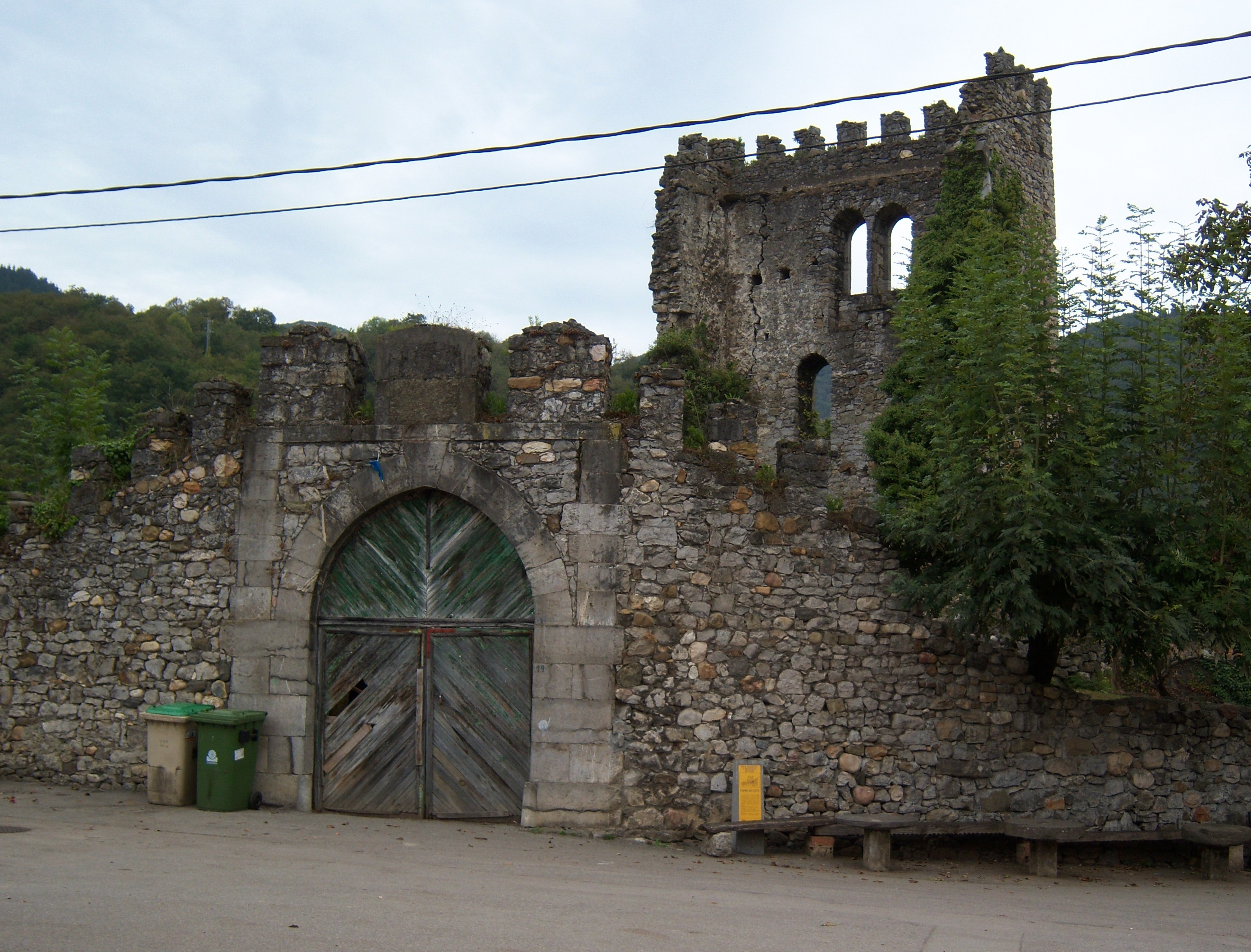

- Location within Spain
- Coordinates: 43.16269°N 5.64615°W
- Country: Spain
- Autonomous community: Asturias
- Province: Asturias
- Municipality: Aller

Area
  - Total: 10.1 km^{2} (3.9 sq mi)

Population (2024)
  - Total: 214
  - Density: 21.2/km^{2} (54.9/sq mi)
- Time zone: UTC+1 (CET)
  - Summer (DST): UTC+2 (CEST)

Soto is one of 18 parishes in Aller, a municipality within the province and autonomous community of Asturias, in northern Spain. The parish of Soto borders to the north with the parish of Serrapio, to the south with Murias, to the east with Cabañaquinta and to the west with Piñeres.

The altitude is 400 m (1,300 ft) above sea level. It is 10.1 km^{2} (3.9 sq mi) in size with a population of 214 as of January 1, 2024.

Here we can find the Sotos's Tower (or Torre de Soto in Spanish) that was built during the 12th century. This tower was abandoned and some studies said it may collapse. After some projects, the restoration of the tower started in April 2022 and ended in August 2022.

Climbing a slope of several hundred meters we reach the sanctuary of Our Lady of Miravalles. On that same plain there was a basilica dating from the 9th century of which there are no remains. The sanctuary is located on a privileged plain within the mountainous terrain of the council of Aller.

== Villages ==
- Acebedo
- Castañeo
- Los Estruḷḷones
- Orozá
- La Palombar
- Rucao
- Santana
- Soto
- Las Cargaeros
- La Casieḷḷa
- Espineo
- La Foz
- Pumardenuño
- El Turnu
