= Felechosa =

Village in Spain

Coordinates: 43°06′13″N 5°30′29″W

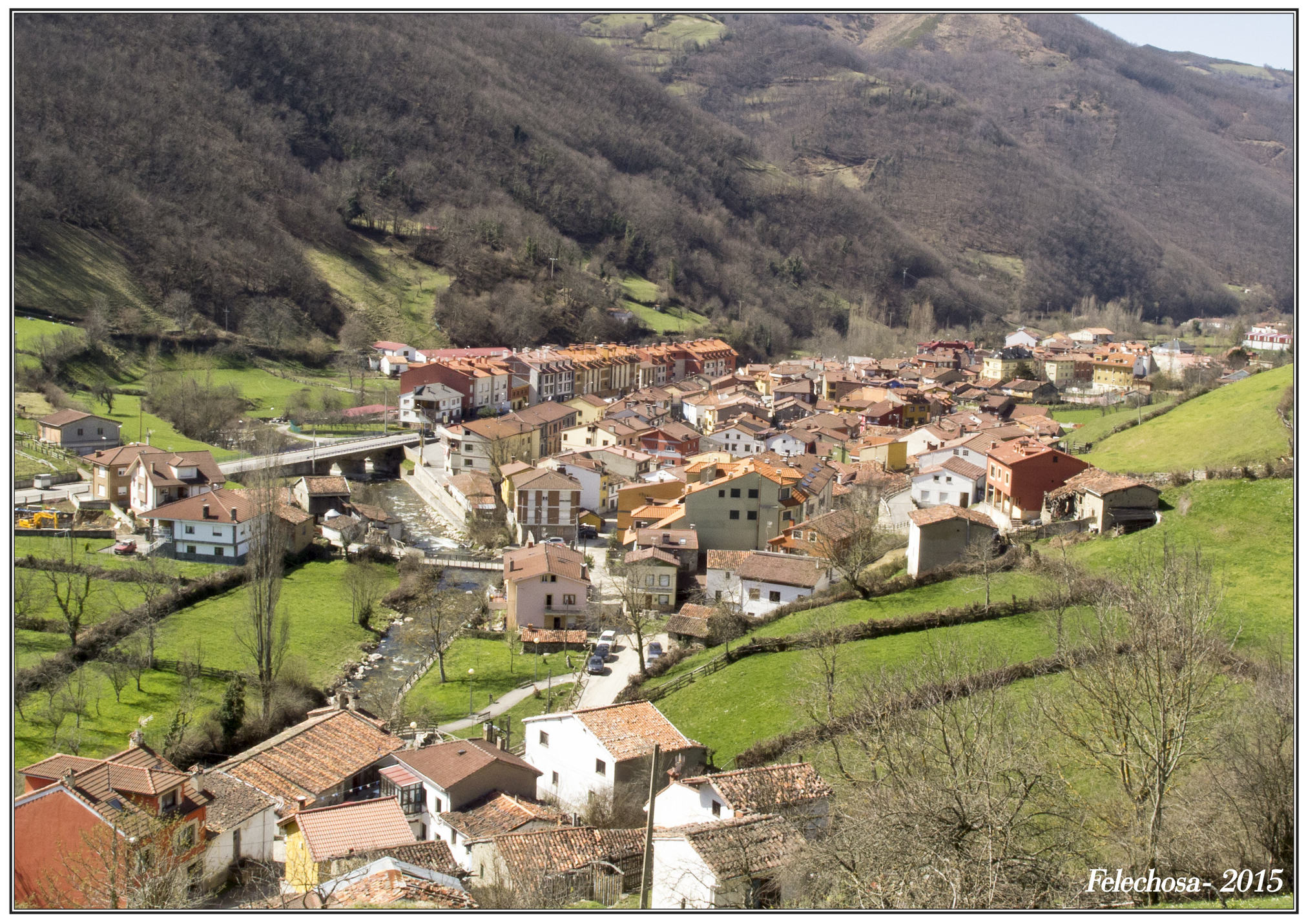

Felechosa is a village in Asturias in Spain, in El Pino Parish of Aller Municipality. Its dialect of Asturian is different from many others of the region.

== Language ==
Felechosa's dialect of the Asturian Language is known for distinguishing masculine singular nouns from mass nouns by raising the stressed vowel, with mid vowels becoming high and /a/ becoming /e/. This extends to the adjective paradigm, with the word for "good" declining as [bwino] in the masculine singular rather than [bwenu] as in other dialects of Asturian.
