= Vega (Aller) =

- Parish
- Location within Spain
- Coordinates: 43.15581°N 5.60889°W
- Country: Spain
- Autonomous community: Asturias
- Province: Asturias
- Municipality: Aller

Area
  - Total: 6.8 km^{2} (2.6 sq mi)

Population (2024)
  - Total: 129
  - Density: 19/km^{2} (49/sq mi)
- Time zone: UTC+1 (CET)
  - Summer (DST): UTC+2 (CEST)

Vega is one of 18 parishes in Aller, a municipality within the province and autonomous community of Asturias, in northern Spain.

The altitude is 475 m (1,558 ft) above sea level. It is 6.8 km^{2} (2.6 sq mi) in size with a population of 129 as of January 1, 2024.

== Villages ==
- Escobio
- Fornos
- Levinco
- Vega
