= Santa Bárbara bendita =

Traditional Asturian coal miner song

Santa Bárbara (also known as Nel Pozu Maria Luisa and Santa Bárbara Bendita) is a traditional song of the Asturian and Leonese coal miners.

== The song ==
The deeply emotional lyrics and the sorrowful and heroic score, usually sung a cappella by a male choir, turned the song into a symbol of Asturian coal mining and of mining in general. Sometimes used as a working class anthem, the hymn was widely used during the Asturian miners uprising of 1934 and during the Spanish Civil War.

The lyrics (usually sung in Asturian, Spanish or a mixture between both languages) describe the painful returning home of a miner, covered in the blood of his fellow miners, who tells his wife (Maruxina) of a mining accident in the famous Asturian mine known as Pozu Maria Luisa (located in Ciañu, Langreo).
Coal mining, which is present in Asturias since the 18th century having a pivotal role in the historical economic activity of the region, is known as a very dangerous activity. Historically, hundreds of miners have died in the mines of Asturias and deadly mining accidents were sadly common in the miner population.

Santa Bárbara is nowadays considered to be an important piece of Asturian traditional music and is included prominently in the Asturian folk music repertoire. The song is also often used in funerals, tributes and memorials.

== Original Asturian version ==
Nel pozu María Luisa
Trailarai larai, trailarai
Nel pozu María Luisa
Trailarai larai, trailarai
Morrieron cuatro mineros
mira, mira Maruxina, mira
mira como vengo yo

Traigo la camisa roxa
Trailarai larai, trailarai
Traigo la camisa roxa
Trailarai larai, trailarai
De sangre d'un compañeru
Mira, mirái Maruxina, mira
mira como vengo yo

Traigo la cabeza rota
Trailarai larai, trailarai
Traigo la cabeza rota
Trailarai larai, trailarai
Que me la rompió un barrenu
Mira, mira Maruxina, mira
mira como vengo yo

Santa Bárbara bendita
Trailarai larai, trailarai
Santa Bárbara bendita
Trailarai larai, trailarai
patrona de los mineros
Mira, mira Maruxina, mira
mira como vengo yo
Patrona de los mineros
Mira, mira Maruxina, mira
mira como vengo yo

== English translation ==
In the María Luisa pit //
Trailarai larai, trailarai
In the María Luisa mine
Trailarai larai, trailarai
Four miners have died
Look, look Maruxina, look
look how I'm coming home

My shirt has turned red
Trailarai larai, trailarai
My shirt has turned red
Trailarai larai, trailarai
Stained with the blood of a fellow miner
Look, look Maruxina, look
look how I'm coming home

My head has broken
Trailarai larai, trailarai
My head has broken
Trailarai larai, trailarai
It was broken in a blast
Look, look Maruxina, look
look how I'm coming home

Blessed Saint Barbara,
Trailarai larai, trailarai
Blessed Saint Barbara
Trailarai larai, trailarai
Patron saint of the miners
Look, look Maruxina, look
look how I'm coming home
Patron saint of the miners
Look, look Maruxina, look
look how I'm coming home

A last couplet, sometimes omitted because of politically incorrect profanity, runs likewise:

Cago en los capataces Arrivistas y esquiroles (Variant) Accionistas y esquiroles

I Crap on the foremen (they're all) hustlers and union scabs (variant) And the shareholders and unions scabs too
