= Murias (Aller) =

- Parish
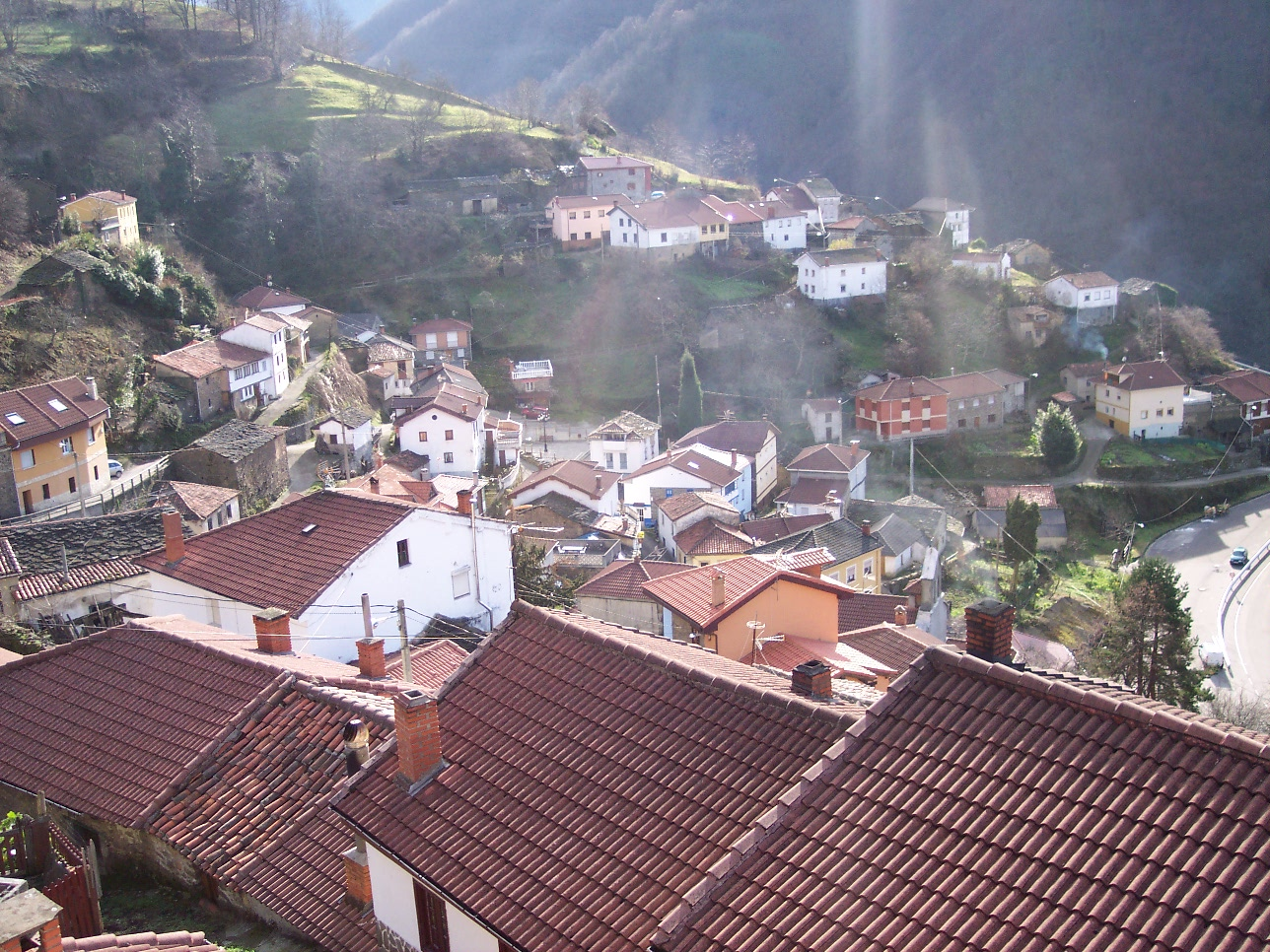

- Location within Spain
- Coordinates: 43.12957°N 5.67253°W
- Country: Spain
- Autonomous community: Asturias
- Province: Asturias
- Municipality: Aller

Area
  - Total: 47.59 km^{2} (18.37 sq mi)

Population (2024)
  - Total: 151
  - Density: 3.17/km^{2} (8.22/sq mi)
- Time zone: UTC+1 (CET)
  - Summer (DST): UTC+2 (CEST)

Murias is one of 18 parishes in Aller, a municipality within the province and autonomous community of Asturias, in northern Spain.

The altitude 625 m (2,051 ft) above sea level. It is 47.59 km^{2} (18.37 sq mi) in size with a population of 151 as of January 1, 2024.

== Villages ==
- Santibáñez de Murias (Santibanes de Murias)
- Villar
- Murias
