= Cabanaquinta =

Parish in Aller, Asturias, Spain

Cabanaquinta Cabañaquinta
- Parish
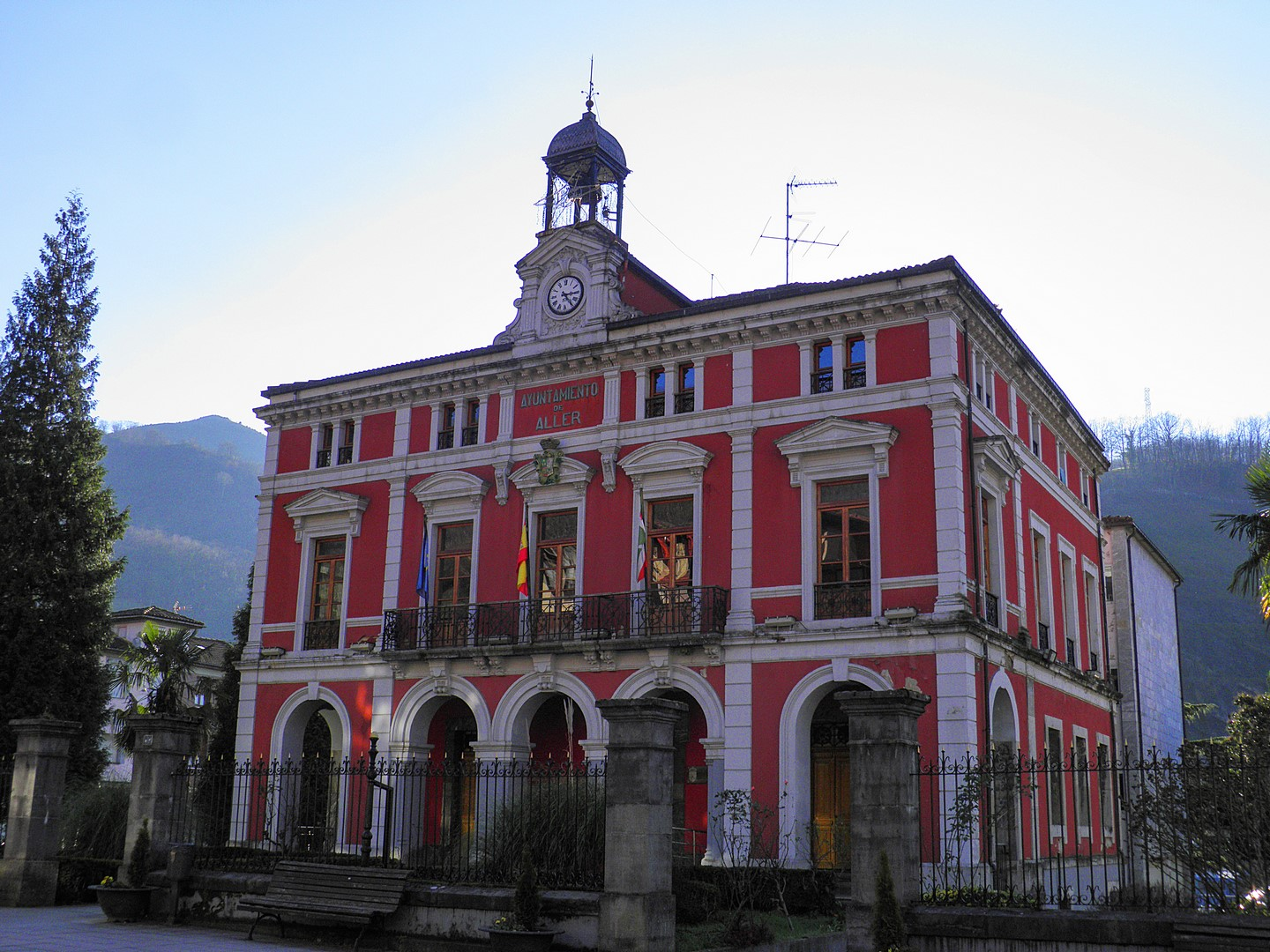

- Location within Spain
- Coordinates: 43.15808°N 5.61918°W
- Country: Spain
- Autonomous community: Asturias
- Province: Asturias
- Municipality: Aller

Area
  - Total: 4.71 km^{2} (1.82 sq mi)

Population (2024)
  - Total: 1,338
  - Density: 284/km^{2} (736/sq mi)
- Time zone: UTC+1 (CET)
  - Summer (DST): UTC+2 (CEST)

Cabanaquinta (Spanish name: Cabañaquinta, and officially Cabanaquinta / Cabañaquinta) is one of 18 parishes in Aller, a municipality within the province and autonomous community of Asturias, in northern Spain.

The altitude is 427 m (1,401 ft) above sea level. It is 4.71 km^{2} (1.82 sq mi) in size with a population of 1,338 as of January 1, 2024.

== Villages ==
- La Coḷḷá
- El Barriru
- La Bolera
- El Buliru
- La Foyaca
- La Garduña
- El Merendonal
- Parrieḷḷes
- La Pedrera
- La Plaza
- La Polea
- El Recuistru
- Rozá
- La Sierra
- Solasierra
- Sopedraño
- La Vacaína
- La Vaḷḷina
