= Mining Museum of Asturias =

Mining museum in El Entrego, Spain

Coordinates: 43°17′17″N 5°39′10″W

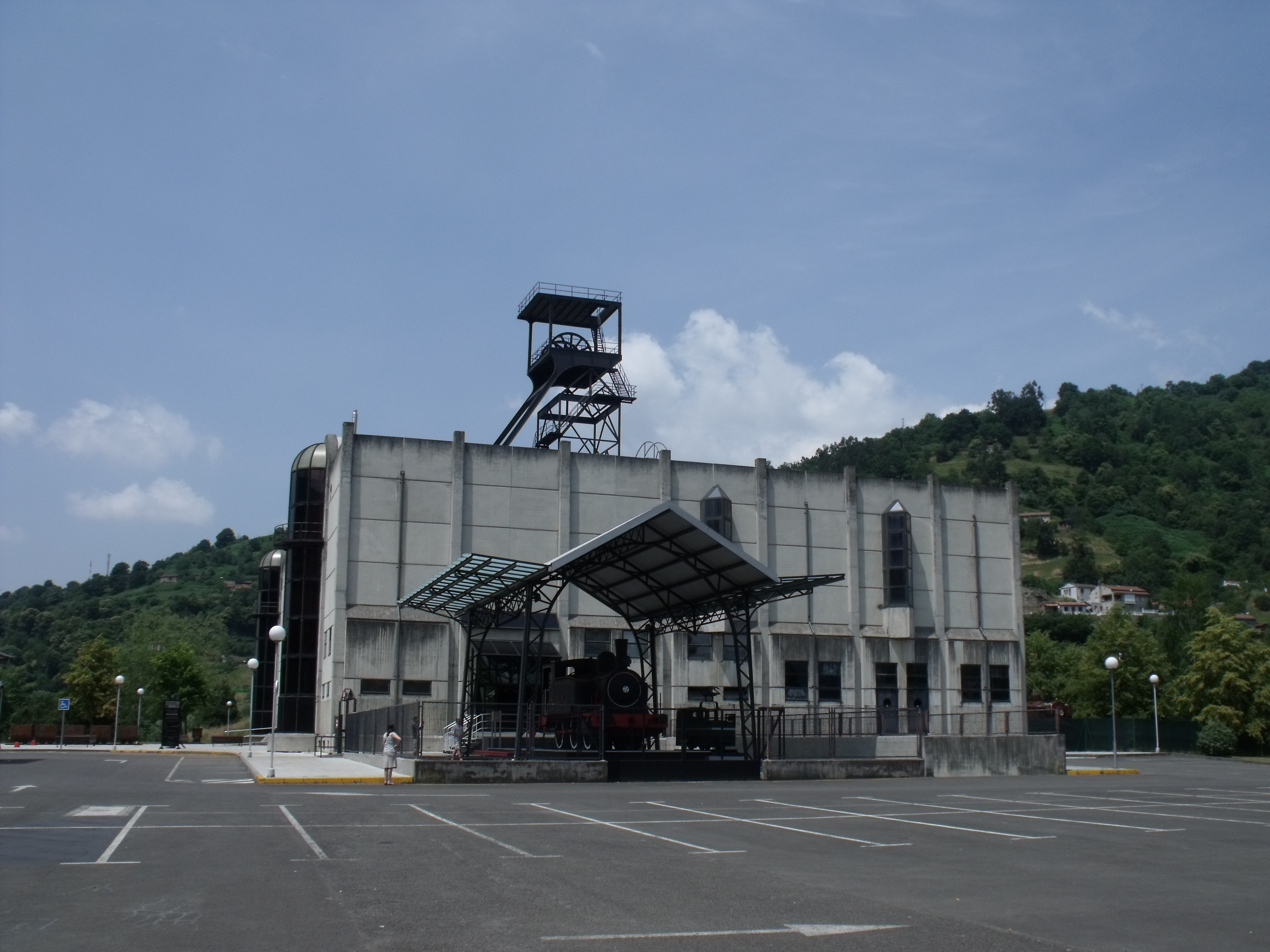
Mining Museum of Asturias

Mining Museum of Asturias ((in Spanish): Museo de la Minería de Asturias, MUMI) is located in El Entrego, San Martín del Rey Aurelio, Asturias, Spain. MUMI opened in 1994. The complex includes the information on mining activity that developed in the coalfields of Asturias from the 18th century as well as the history of coal mining, the Industrial Revolution, and technological advances in the field of coal mining. The main building comprises a cylindrical central area with a tower. Two aisles are attached to the main building and are home to numerous exhibition halls, and other services. Apart from the extensive exhibits and machinery on display, a simulated underground mine can be accessed by a cage, and is considered the main attraction of the museum.
