= Caudal (river) =

River in Asturias, Spain

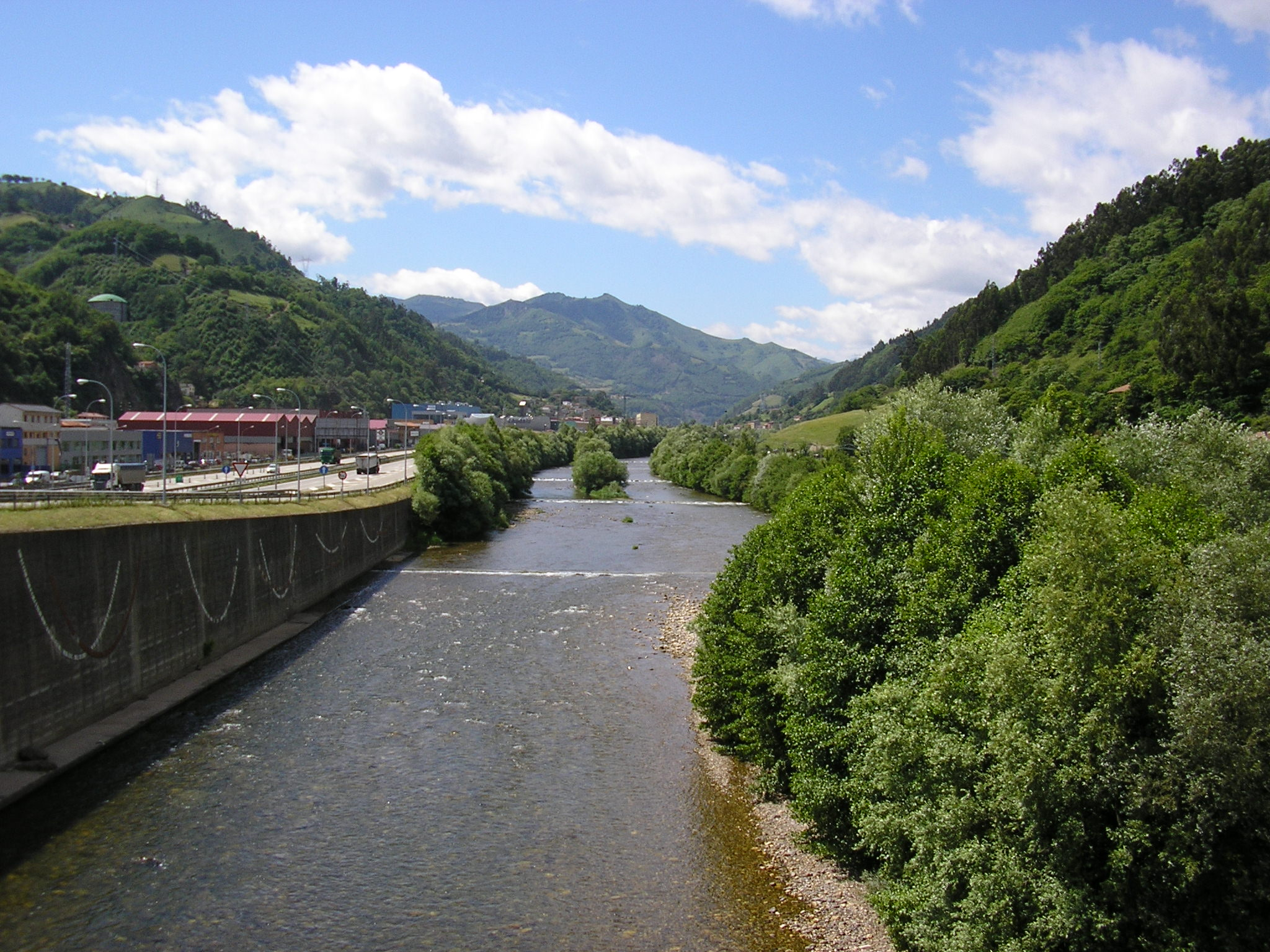
- View of the Caudal river passing through Mieres.

Location
- Country: Spain
- State: Asturias

Physical characteristics
- Source
  - elevation: 256 m (840 ft)
- Mouth
  - location: Nalón River
  - coordinates: 43°18′00″N 005°52′00″W
- Length: 18 km (11 mi)

The Caudal is a river in northern Spain flowing through the Autonomous Community of Asturias.

The main part of a thick succession of Pennsylvanian strata that contains workable coal seams in its upper part has an exposure in the Asturian Central Coal Basin, particularly in the areas around the Aller, Caudal, and Nalon rivers.
