= Bustieḷḷu =

Coordinates: 43.35°N 6.5°W

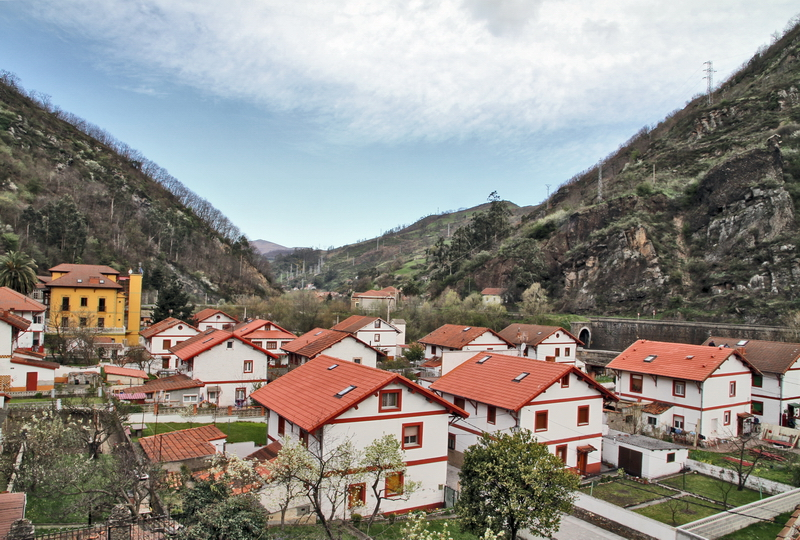
miners' houses, Bustieḷḷu

Bustieḷḷu (Spanish: Bustiello) is one of 44 parishes (administrative divisions) in Tinéu, a municipality within the province and autonomous community of Asturias, in northern Spain.

Situated at 577 m (1,893 ft) above sea level, it has a population of 98 (INE 2007), and is 3.83 km^{2} (1.48 sq mi) in size. The postal code is 33878.
