= Luis F. Álvarez =

Spanish-American physician (1853–1937)

Luis F. Alvarez
- Born: Luis Fernández Álvarez; 4 January 1853; Mallecina, Salas, Asturias, Spain
- Died: 24 May 1937 (aged 84); Hawaii, U.S.
- Scientific career
- Fields: Medicine
- Spouse: Clementina Schutze
- Children: 4, including Walter C. Alvarez and Mabel Alvarez

Luis Fernández Álvarez (1 April 1853 – 24 May 1937) was a Spanish-American physician and researcher who practiced in California and Hawaii.

Fernández was actually his principal surname (his father's surname), per Spanish naming customs. However, he is best known by his mother's surname, as in the English-speaking world the last name is the principal surname, although, again, this is contrary to Spanish naming customs. His American-born children and descendants took his last surname for that reason, as well, albeit without the diacritic.

== Early life ==
Álvarez was born in a small village called Maecina, Salas, Asturias. His father was Eugenio Fernández, who was in charge of the business and palace affairs in Madrid of Infante Francisco de Paula of Spain, a Spanish royal prince and the youngest son of the former king Carlos IV. He was orphaned at an early age: his mother died when he was three, and he lost his father at the age of seven. When he was 13, one of his brothers took him to Havana where he secured a good education. He learned to speak English fluently.

In 1878, he married Clementina Schutze and in 1888 graduated from Cooper Medical College (now Stanford University) with a medical degree. After practicing in San Francisco, he traveled to Hawaii as physician on the SS Australia. In Honolulu, he was asked by the government to stay and become a government physician. Álvarez quickly learned to speak the Hawaiian language.

== Career ==
In 1895, Álvarez resigned his position in Waialua to prepare himself for work as superintendent of a new experimental hospital for the treatment of leprosy which was to be established in Kalihi, a suburb of Honolulu. In order to learn research bacteriology, Álvarez went – at his own expense – for six months of intensive study at Johns Hopkins University.

On his return, he developed a method for the better diagnosis of macular leprosy. With a small mouse-tooth forceps he would lift up a little piece of skin, snip it off with scissors, grind it into a fluid in a small glass mortar, and then stain the fluid for Hansen's bacilli. This method or a modification of it has been used ever since. Álvarez developed a serum by injecting Hansen's bacilli into horses. He used this on a number of Hansen's disease patients with encouraging results.
