= Ranon =

Ranon may refer to:

- Ranón, one of five parishes in Soto del Barco, a municipality in Asturias, in northern Spain
- Rånön, an island in the northwest of the Swedish sector of the Bay of Bothnia, in the Kalix archipelago
