= Soto del Barco (parish) =

Coordinates: 43.533333°N 6.066667°W

Soto del Barco (variant: San Pedro) is one of five parishes (administrative divisions) in Soto del Barco, a municipality within the province and autonomous community of Asturias, in northern Spain.

It is 10.09 km^{2} (3.90 sq mi) in size, with a population of 1,570 (INE 2005).

== Villages ==
- Caseras
- El Castillu
- Fancubierta
- La Florida
- El Forcón
- Llagu
- La Llana
- La Madalena
- La Marrona
