= Luis Amado-Blanco =

Spanish-born journalist and Cuban ambassador (1903–1975)

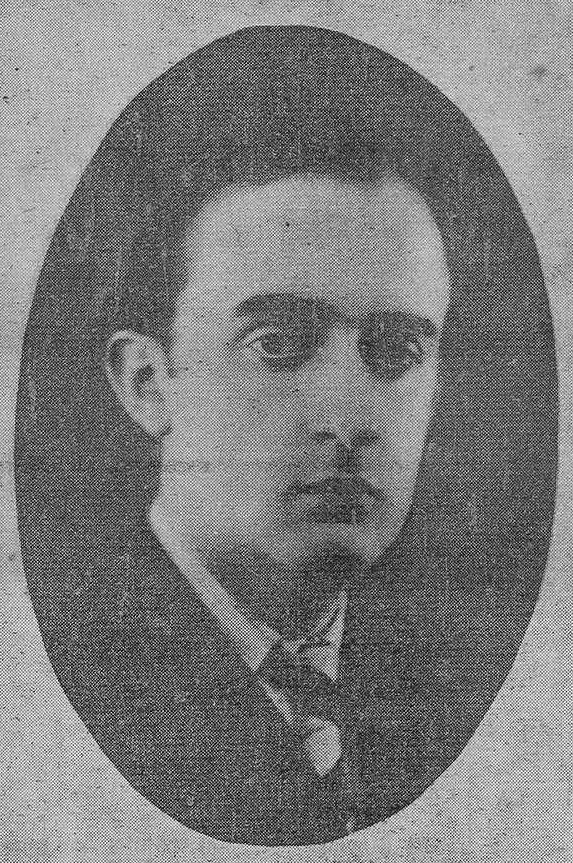
- Born: April 4, 1903; Riberas de Pravia, Asturias, Spain
- Died: March 9, 1975 (aged 71); Rome, Italy

Luis Amado-Blanco Fernandez (April 4, 1903 – March 9, 1975) was a distinguished journalist and Ambassador from Cuba to Portugal and then to the Holy See from 1961–1975.

== Biography ==
Fernandez was born in Riberas de Pravia, Asturias, Spain. He initially travelled to Cuba as a correspondent for El Heraldo de Madrid to report on the fall of Gerardo Machado. He permanently moved in 1936 and lead an active cultural life. He received the Talia Prize for his direction of La Dama de Alba by Alejandro Casona as well as the Justo de Lara Prize. In 1951, he received the Premio Nacional for the story Sola. Among his more famous novels is Ciudad Rebelde.

He was the first Cuban Revolutionary Government Ambassador to Portugal, and from 1961 he was the Cuban Ambassador to the Holy See, where he was the dean of the diplomatic corps. He died in Rome, Italy.
