= Walter C. Alvarez =

American medical doctor (1884–1978)

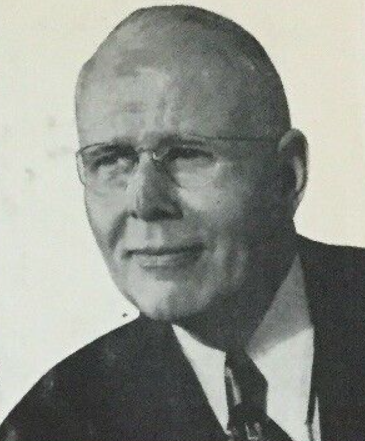
- Born: Walter Clement Álvarez; July 22, 1884; San Francisco, California
- Died: June 18, 1978 (aged 93); San Francisco, California
- Education: Cooper Medical College
- Occupation: physician
- Years active: 1913-1925
- Spouse: Harriet Skidmore Smythe (m. 1907; died 1973)
- Children: Gladys, Luis, Robert and Bernice
- Parent: Luis F. Alvarez
- Relatives: Mabel Alvarez

Walter Clement Alvarez (July 22, 1884 – June 18, 1978) was an American physician of Spanish descent. He authored several dozen books on medicine, and wrote introductions and forewords for many others.

== Biography ==
He was born in San Francisco and spent his childhood in Hawaii, where his father, Luis F. Alvarez, was a government physician. His father worked as a physician in California and Hawaii and developed a method for the better diagnosis of macular leprosy. In Hawaii, his father looked after migrant laborers working on sugar cane plantations. His sister was California artist and oil painter Mabel Alvarez. In 1910, having received his medical education in Stanford University, he began his practice.

From 1913 to the end of 1925, Alvarez practiced internal medicine in San Francisco and conducted research at the University of California, Berkeley. He lived at 3837 Clay Street raising his family. In 1926, he joined the Mayo Clinic practice in Rochester, Minnesota until his retirement in 1950, where he lived at 815 5th St SW in the historic Pill Hill neighborhood. In 1934, he became Professor of Medicine at the University of Minnesota (Mayo Foundation) and later served as Consultant in Medicine Emeritus. In his 25 years as a physician at Mayo, Alvarez published 347 scientific papers, focusing on digestion and the human gut. He would be praised by colleagues for his willingness to explore beyond his specialty, and peer into the minds of his patients during treatment.

Alvarez was married to the former Harriet Skidmore Smythe and the couple had four children: Gladys, Luis, Robert and Bernice. Luis later became a Nobel Prize-winning physicist. His grandson is Walter Alvarez, a Professor of Geology at the University of California, Berkeley.

Beginning after his retirement in 1951, Alvarez began writing a medical column which soon became syndicated throughout North America in hundreds of daily and weekly newspapers. The Walter C. Alvarez Memorial Award is named in his honor and is presented to a member or nonmember of the American Medical Writers Association to honor excellence in communicating health care developments and concepts to the public. He worked to make his findings more understandable for the public. He is most notable for his enlightened approach to homosexuality and his efforts to educate the medical profession and the broader public about the topic. He is regarded as an ally of the homophile movement in the 1950s-1970s. He is known for his work on gastroenterology, with many thousands of physicians of the 20th century studying his notes and writings.

Alvarez' syndrome, a syndrome of hysterical or neurotic abdominal bloating without any excess of gas in the digestive tract, and Alvarez-waves, painless uterine contractions occurring during the length of pregnancy, are named after him.

Alvarez was the first to investigate electric activity of a stomach and, thereby, became the founder of a new diagnostic gastroenterology branch — electrogastrography. Aside from that, he also was among some of the first doctors in the world to emphasize the weight and significance of food allergy.

He died in California in 1978.

His personal papers are held by Lane's Archives and Special Collections.

== Alvarez's syndrome ==
Alvarez's syndrome is a medical disorder in which the abdomen becomes bloated without any obvious reason, such as intestinal gas. It may be caused when the muscles of the superior abdominal wall contract and push the contents of the abdomen inferiorly and anteriorly. It may be a psychogenic disorder. Currently, there is no cure to Alvarez's syndrome, but symptoms can often be improved through dietary changes, medications and in rare cases, surgery. It was discovered by and named by Alvarez in the late 1940s.

== Publications ==
- Alvarez on Alvarez, 1977
- Walter C. Alvarez: American Man of Medicine, 1976
- Inglenook Doctor Book, 1975
- Dr. Walter C. Alvarez on Health & Life, 1975
- Gay Liberation and Homosexuality and Other Forms of Sexual Deviance (co-written with Sue March), 1974
- The New Home Medical Encyclopedia (co-authored with Samuel L. Andelman), 1974
- Nerves in Collision, 1972
- Danger Signals: How to Recognize the Warnings of Serious Diseases, 1966
- Little Strokes, 1966
- Incurable Physician, An Autobiography, 1963
- Minds that Came Back, 1961
- Geriatrics: Devoted to Research and Clinical Study of the Diseases, 1958
- Practical Leads to Puzzling Diagnoses: Neuroses that Run Through Families, 1958
- Live at Peace with Your Nerves, 1958
- How to Live with Your Arthritis, 1953
- The Neuroses: Diagnosis and Management of Functional Disorders and Minor Psychoses, 1951
- How to Live with Your Ulcer, 1951
- Brief Psychotheraphy: A Handbook for Physicians on the Clinical Aspects of Neuroses (co-written with Bertrand S. Frohman and Evelyn P. Frohman), 1948
- Nervousness, Indigestion and Pain, 1943 (Previously issued as Nervous Indigestion)
- Help Your Doctor to Help You When You Have Food Allergy, 1941
- Help Your Doctor to Help You When You Have Gallstones and Disease of the Gallbladder, 1941
- The March of Medicine (co-written with Karl A. Menninger), 1940
- An Introduction to Gastroenterology, 1940
- How to Live with your Ulcer, 1933
- Nervous Indigestion, 1931
- The Mechanics of the Digestive Tract: An Introduction to Gastroenterology, 1928
- The Mechanics of the Digestive Tract, 1922
