= Riberas =

Northern Spanish parish

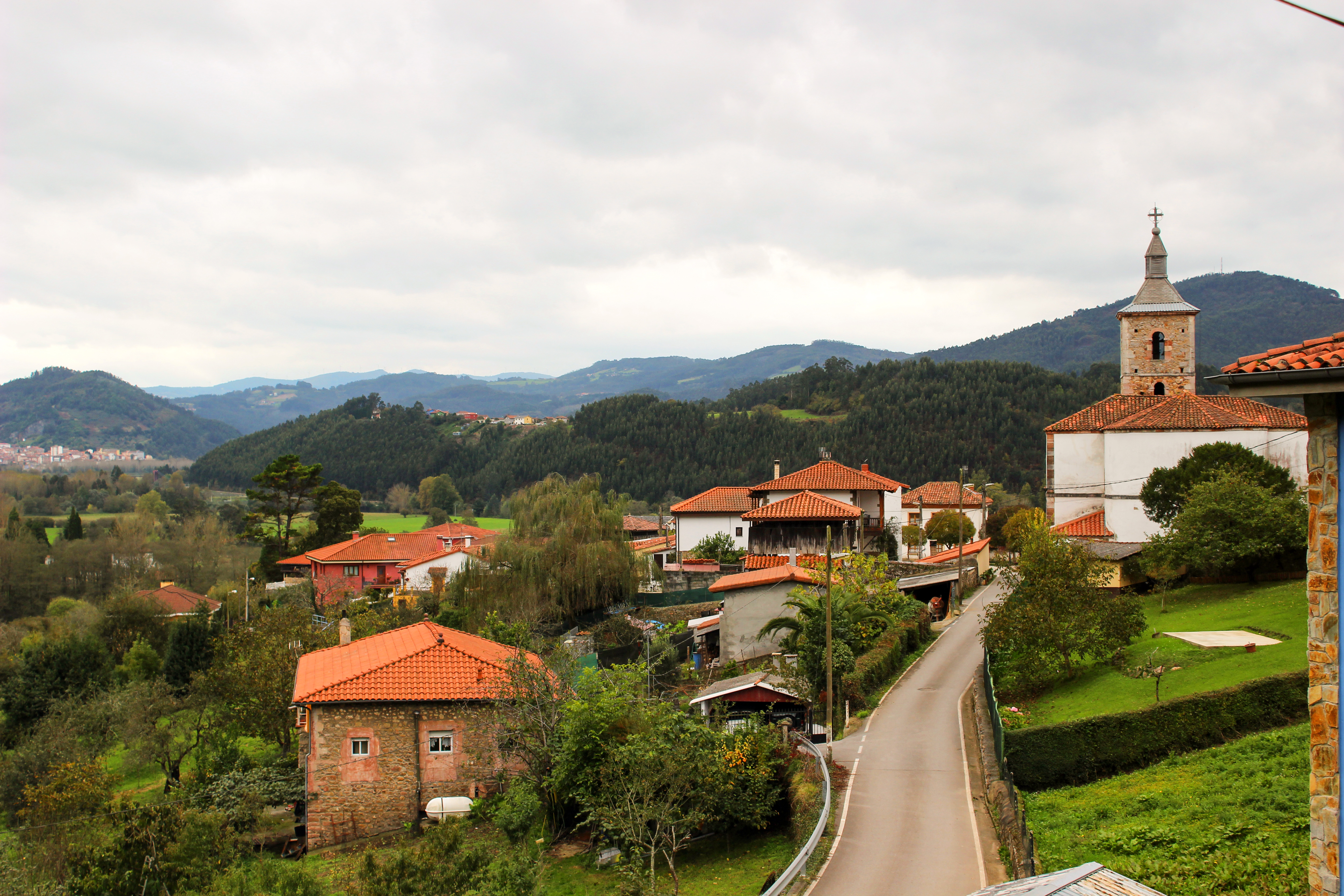
Riberas (Soto del Barco, Asturias)

Riberas is one of five parishes (administrative divisions) in Soto del Barco, a municipality within the province and autonomous community of Asturias, in northern Spain. The journalist and ambassador Luis Amado-Blanco Fernandez was born here in 1903.

Situated at 212 m (696 ft) above sea level, it is 11.48 km^{2} (4.43 sq mi) in size, with a population of 385 (INE 2011). The postal code is 33127.

== Villages and hamlets ==
- La Barrera
- La Bernadal 43.508354°N 6.070223°W
- La Carretera
- Carrocero
- Cotollano
- La Llamera
- Monterrey 43.500746°N 6.071067°W
- Las Rabias
- Riberas
- Santa Eulalia
- El Truébano
- Ucedo
- Los Veneros
- La Quintanona
- La Bimera
