= La Corrada =

Coordinates: 43.52727°N 6.04188°W

La Corrada is one of five parishes (administrative divisions) in Soto del Barco, a municipality within the province and autonomous community of Asturias, in northern Spain.

Situated at 190 m (620 ft) above sea level, it is 7.48 km^{2} (2.89 sq mi) in size, with a population of 409 (INE 2007). The postal code is 33458.

== Villages ==
- Arenas
- Los Calbuetos
- La Carcabina
- Carcedo
- La Corrada
- La Ferrería
- Folgueras
- Ponte
- Ríocuevas
- Sombredo
- La Tejera
