= Soto del Barco =

Soto del Barco Sotu'l Barcu (Asturian)
- Municipality
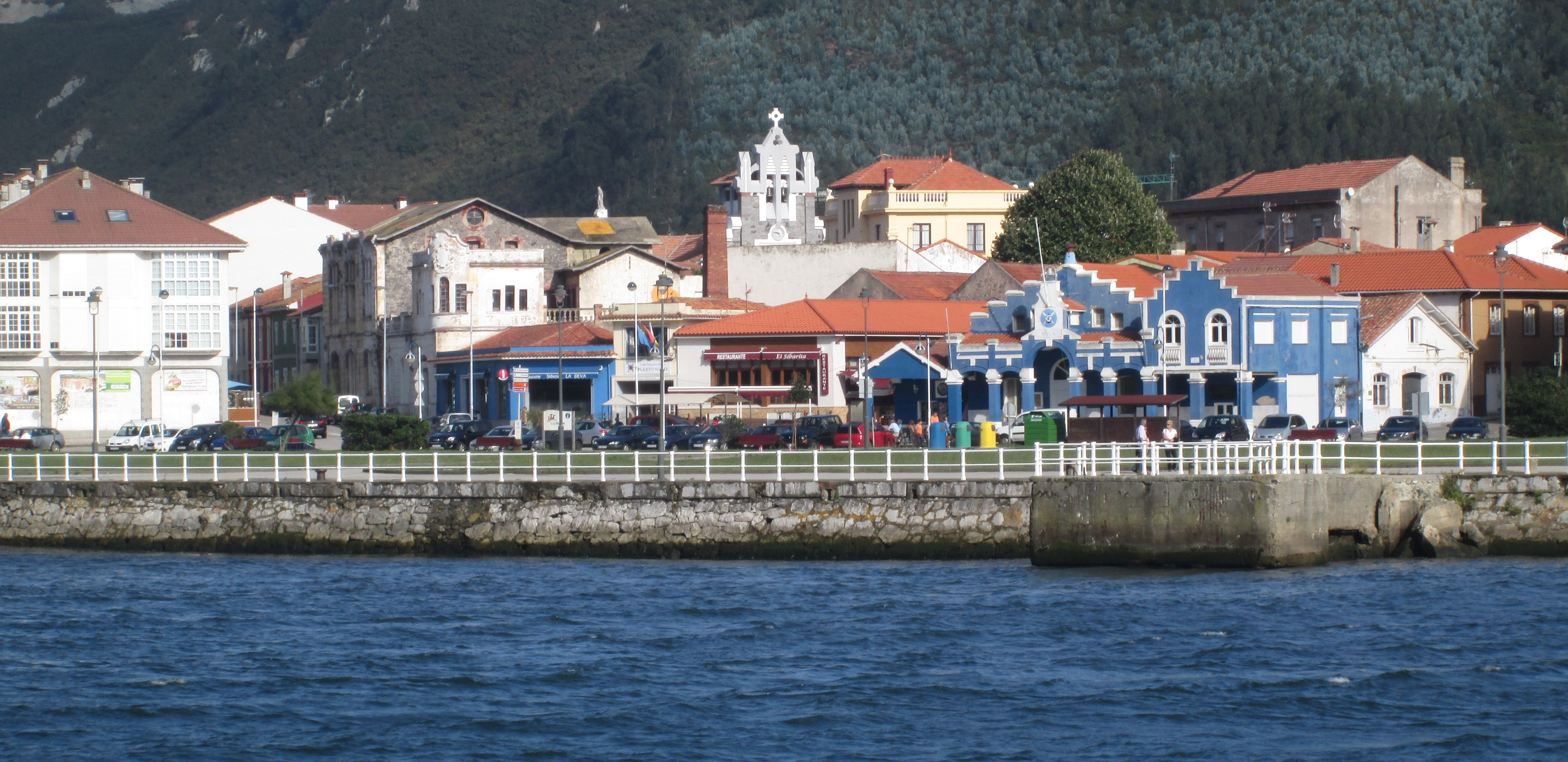
- San Juan de la Arena

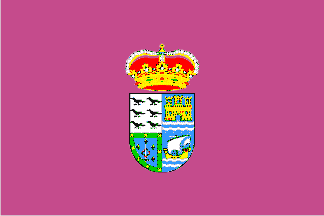
- Flag Coat of arms

- Location in Spain
- Coordinates: 43°33′N 6°6′W
- Country: Spain
- Autonomous community: Asturias
- Province: Asturias
- Judicial district: Pravia
- Capital: Soto

Government
  - Alcalde: María del Carmen Arango Sánchez (PSOE)

Area
  - Total: 8.09 km^{2} (3.12 sq mi)
- Highest elevation: 131 m (430 ft)

Population (2023)
  - Total: 3,818
  - Density: 472/km^{2} (1,220/sq mi)
- Demonym: murense
- Time zone: UTC+1 (CET)
  - Summer (DST): UTC+2 (CEST)
- Postal code: 33138
- Website: Official website

Soto del Barco (Asturian: Sotu'l Barcu) is a small, coastal municipality in the Autonomous Community of the Principality of Asturias, Spain. It is located on the banks of the mouth of the Nalón and along the Cantabrian coast. As of 2023, the municipality is home to 3,818 people who reside in five parishes: Soto del Barco, L'Arena, Ranón, Riberas, and La Corrada.

After the Roman occupation of Iberia, a fort, which had been constructed in the area in order to defend the mouth of the Nalón, was either restored or reconstructed by Alfonso III; this fort is still standing and is known as the Castillo de San Martín. Until 1836, Soto del Barco fell under the municipality of Pravia; it became independent on 29 December. Its population reached its peak at over 6,000 in the 1960s; due to the weakening of the local fishing and canning industries, the population has fallen markedly since that decade. The service and tourism industries are now the largest in the municipality.

== Gallery ==
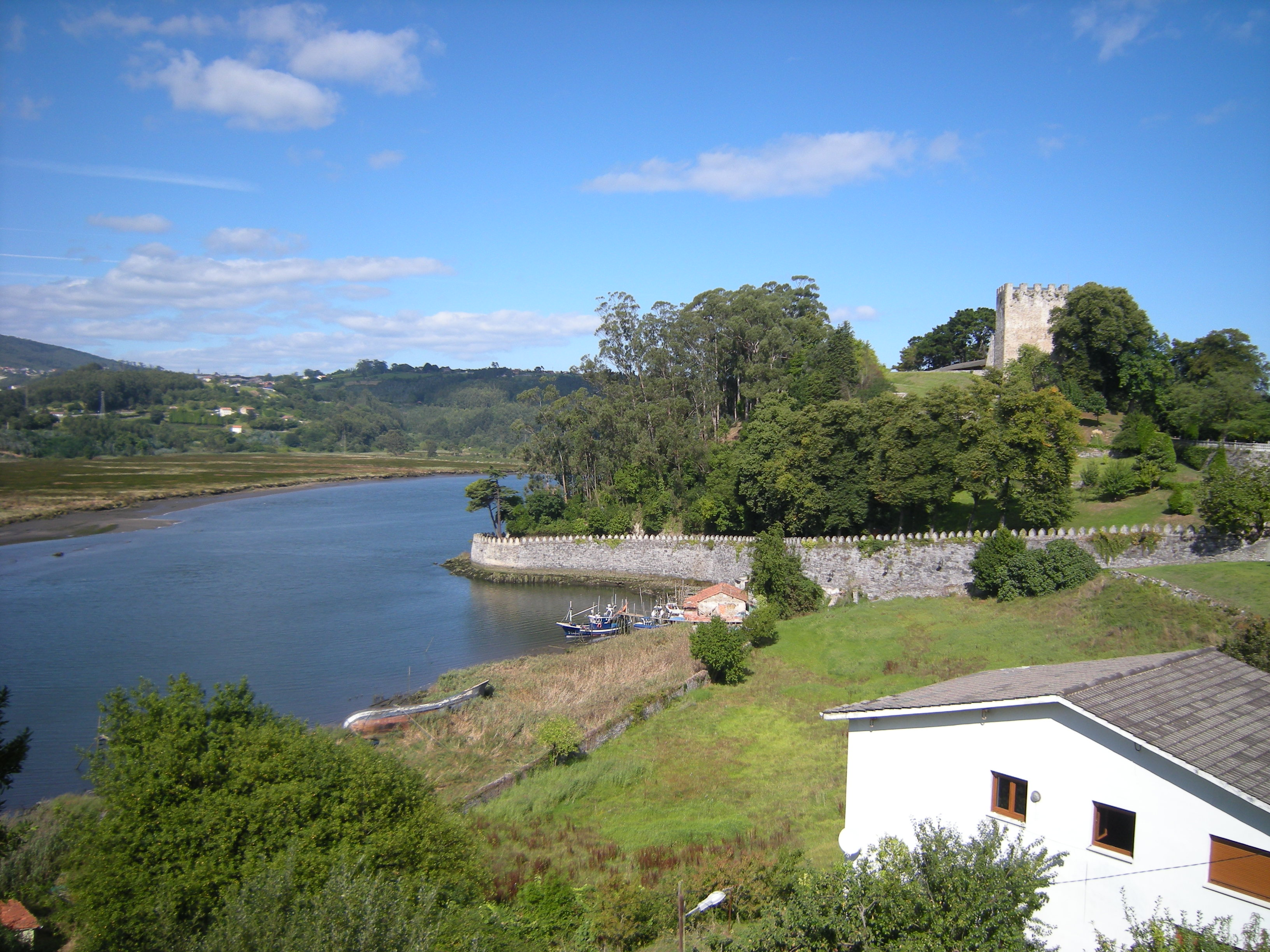
Castillo de San Martín

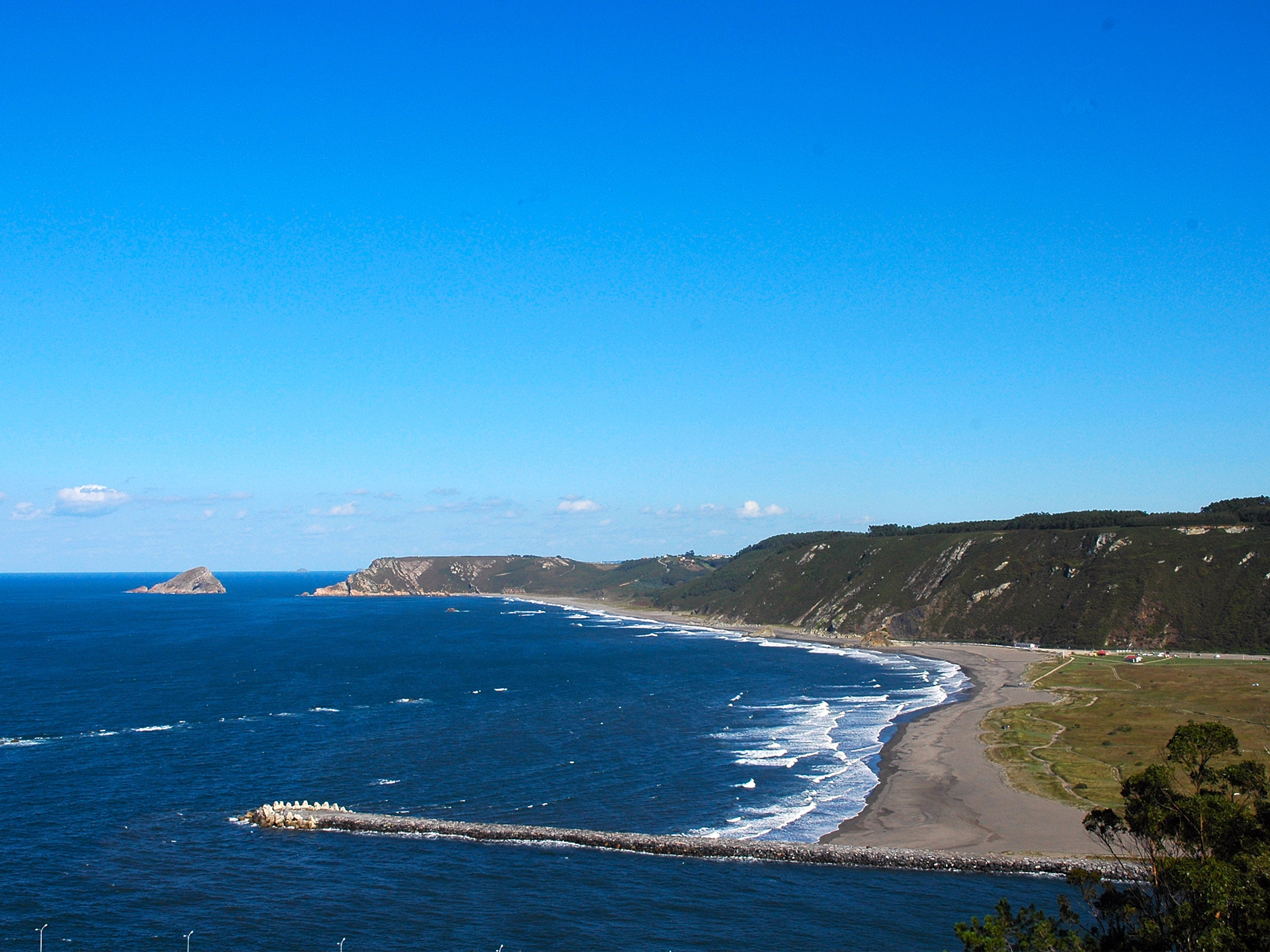
Los Quebrantos Beach

== See also ==
- List of municipalities in Asturias
