= Ranón =

Parish in Asturias, Spain

Coordinates: 43.566667°N 6.05°W

Ranón is one of five parishes (administrative divisions) in Soto del Barco, a municipality within the province and autonomous community of Asturias, in northern Spain.

Situated at 190 m (620 ft) above sea level, it is 6.29 km^{2} (2.43 sq mi) in size, with a population of 1,722 (INE 2007). The postal code is 33459.
