= Maecina =

Coordinates: 43.45°N 6.25°W

Maecina (Spanish Mallecina) is one of 28 parishes (administrative divisions) in Salas, a municipality within the province and autonomous community of Asturias, in northern Spain.

It is 6.28 km^{2} (2.42 sq mi) in size, with a population of 186.

== Villages ==
- L'Alba
- Cabornu
- El Barriu
- Fontanal
- La Puerta
- Las Corradas
- Maecina
- Valdarrodeiru
- La Retuerta
