= Condado =

Condado or El Condado may refer to:

== Places ==
Brazil

- Condado, Pernambuco
- Condado, Paraíba
- "O Condado" is the official translation of The Shire, a fictional region found in The Lord of the Rings and other works written by J.R.R. Tolkien

Spain

- El Condado (Laviana), Asturias
- Condado de Treviño, Castile and León
- O Condado, Galicia

United States

- Condado (Santurce), Puerto Rico
  - Condado Lagoon
  - Condado Vanderbilt Hotel

== People ==
- Cuitlahuac Condado Escamilla (born 1978), Mexican politician
- Jeudiel Condado (born 1990), Venezuelan business administrator

== Other uses ==
- Condado (horse), a racehorse
