= El Tozu =

El Tozu can refer to two parishes in Asturias:

- El Tozu (Caso)
- El Tozu (Piloña)
