= Casín cheese =

Asturian semi-hard cheese

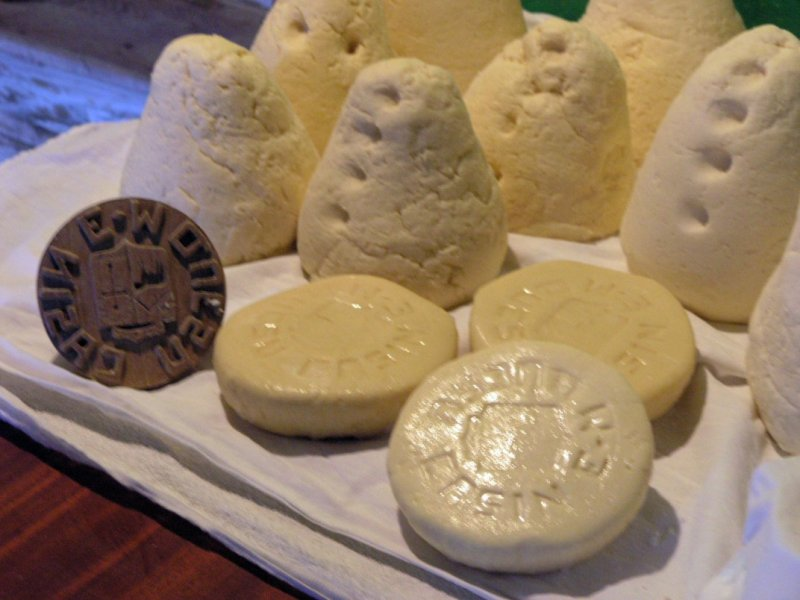
- Country of origin: Spain
- Region: Asturias
- Source of milk: Cows
- Texture: Semi-hard
- Dimensions: 10-20 cm × 4-7 cm
- Weight: 250-1000 g.
- Certification: D.O.P.

Casín cheese (Spanish: queso Casin)is a Spanish cheese made in the Principality of Asturias. Its name is covered by a protected designation of origin (PDO). It is made from full-fat, unpasteurized cows' milk from specific breeds, namely Asturian Mountain (Asturiana de la Montaña, a.k.a. Casina), Asturian Valley (Asturiana de la Valles), Friesian and any crosses between these breeds. Specifically the geographic area of manufacture is the southern part of Asturias which includes the Redes Natural Park (Parque Natural de Redes) and associated land, this is within the municipalities of Caso, Sobrescobio and Piloña. The cheese is classified as hard and semi-hard, and can be semi-cured or cured. It takes its name from one of the breeds of cattle whose milk is used, in turn named after the town of Caso. The shape of the cheese is a thick disc-shape, sometime more conical, of 10–20 cm diameter and 4–7 cm in height. The weight is between 250 and 1,000 g (8.8 and 35.3 oz).

== Manufacturing process ==
The milk used must come from suppliers who are registered with the regulating council. The cows must have fed on local, natural foodstuffs. The milk is coagulated by using animal products, fermenting products are also used along with calcium chloride. The milk is heated to a temperature of 30–35 °C (86–95 °F) for the coagulation, this takes about 45 minutes. The curd is then cut with lyres and the temperature is raised by 2 °C and at the same time the curd is stirred for a minimum of 10 minutes, until it has become coarsely granular, the grains being the size of a hazel nut. It is then left to rest for about 10 minutes. Next the broken curd is put into sacking bags or plastic containers with fine holes to allow the whey to drain. The cheese is then placed in ventilated rooms at 15–20 °C (59–68 °F) for 3 or more days during which they are turned over daily. The cheese is then moulded into its characteristic shape either manually or mechanically. At this time a little salt is added. It is then stored in ventilated rooms for a period of between 5 days to 2 weeks, each piece being turned over daily. Finally the cheeses are given another pressing to give them an aesthetic appearance and the decoration and the mark of the manufacturer is added on the rind. They are left a further 2 more days in the ventilating room. The final maturation takes place in a room between 8–10 °C (46–50 °F) and a humidity of 80%. A period of 2 months is necessary between the coagulation of the milk and final maturity.

The cheese is wrapped before sale to protect the surface of the cheese as it is intended that all the cheese will be eaten. It can be wrapped in paper, cardboard, wood or culinary grade plastic.

== Properties ==
Casín cheese has a strong dairy flavour. It is slightly acid and peppery in well matured cheese, and less so in less matured cheese. The flavour is long-lasting in the mouth.

== Texture ==
Its texture is firm and friable but slightly rubbery and homogeneous. It should have no cavities within the cheese but may have tiny cracks running through the body of the cheese.

== Rind ==
Casín cheese has a smooth, thin rind. It is a yellowy, cream colour, sometimes with whitish patches. It should be clean and dry but slightly greasy. On the surface will be decorations in the form of flowers, plants or geometric figures and the symbol or name of the manufacturer.

== See also ==
Spanish cheeses
