= Asturian Mountain cattle =

Breed of cattle

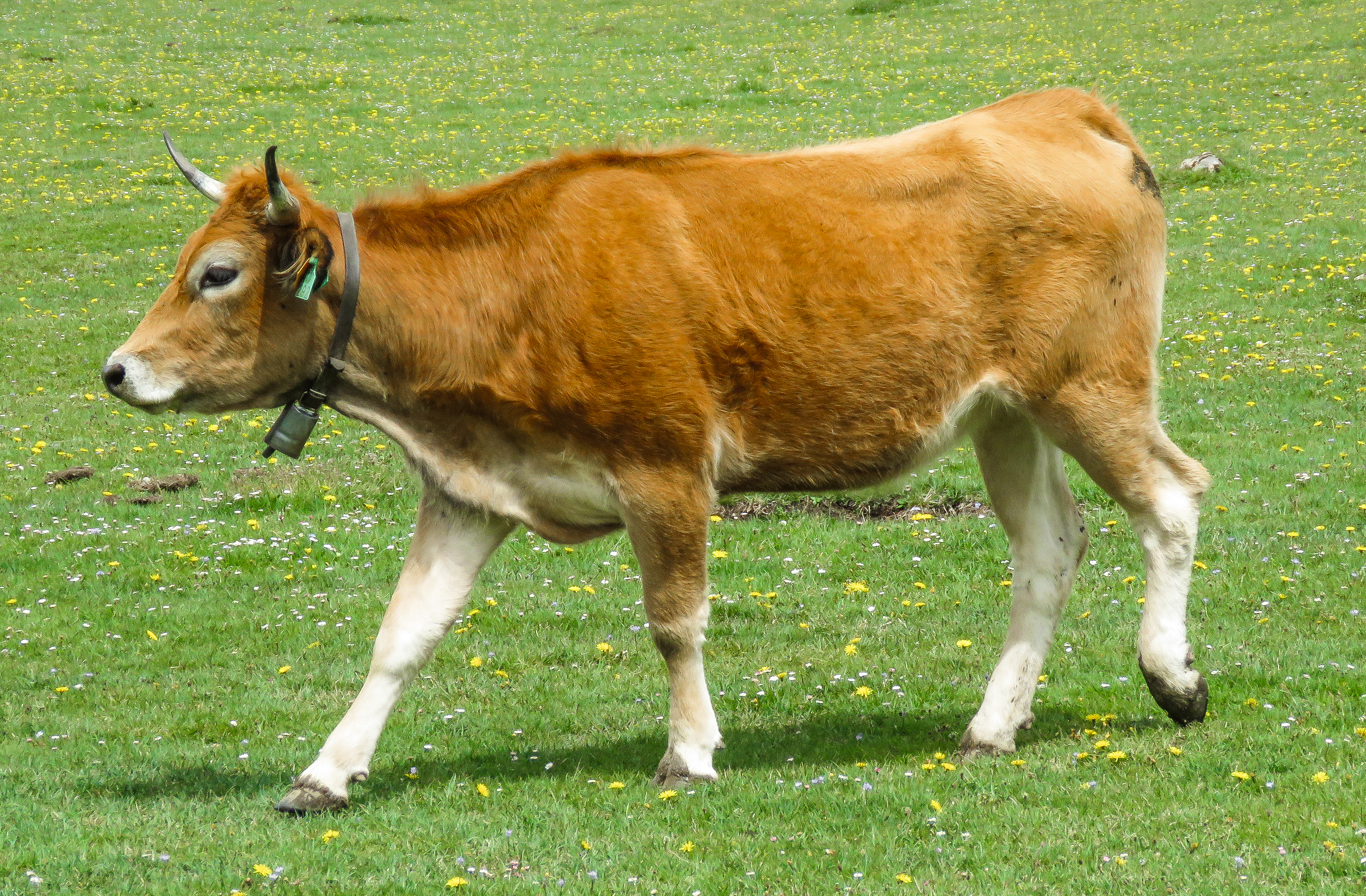
Asturian Mountain Cattle

Asturian Mountain (Spanish: Asturiana de la Montaña) is a local Spanish breed of cattle named after the Asturias, which possess breeding capacity and docility. They are primarily raised in the east of Asturias, in the north of Spain, particularly in the mountain range of the Picos de Europa, including within the National Park of Covadonga. The breed is also known as the Casina (named after the town of Caso) They are beef cattle and one of three breeds used to produce Casín cheese.

== History ==
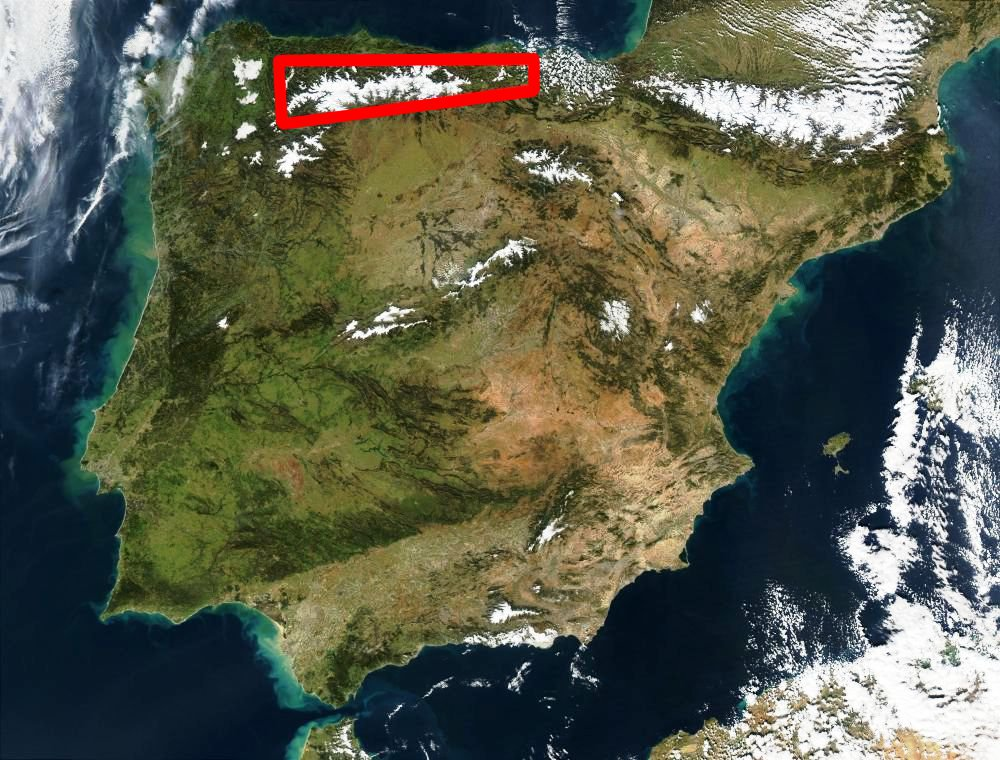
Area where Asturian Mountain cattle are prominent

The official census of Asturian Mountain cattle proceeds from the herdbook, which is managed by La Asociación Española de criadores de ganado vacuno selecto de la raza Asturiana de la Montaña (ASEAMO, 'Spanish Association of breeders of selected cattle of the Asturian Mountain breed') since its creation in 1986.

== Breeding and farming ==
ASEAMO represents associated farmers in Asturias, Cantabria, the Basque Country, Castille-León, Madrid, and La Rioja, Spain.

== Commercial output ==
Asturian Mountain (Casina) cattle meat has the protected designation Casín beef or meat, and the breed is one of three that may be used to produce Casín cheese.

== See also ==
- Asturian Valley
