= Tozo =

Tozo may refer to:

== People ==
- Minanogawa Tōzō (1903–1971), Japanese sumo wrestler
- Tozo, Brazilian football player

== Places ==
- Tozo (Caso), Spain
- Tozo (Piloña), Spain
- Tozo, South Sudan
