= Caso, Asturias =

Caso Casu
- Municipality
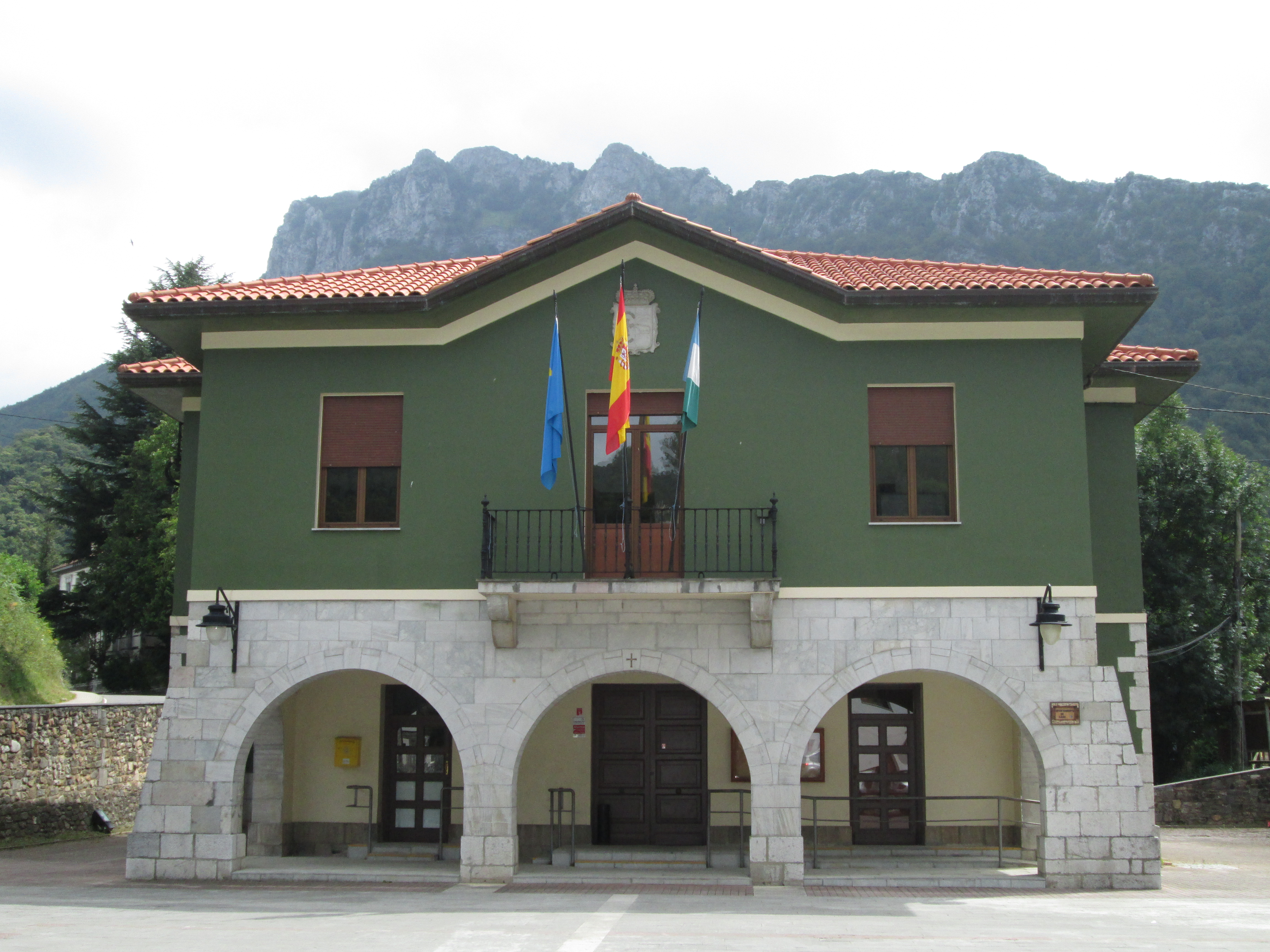
- Town Hall

- Coat of arms

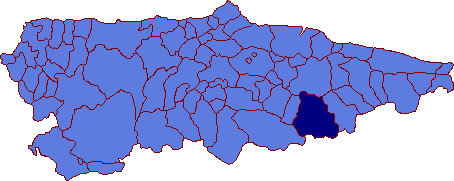
- Interactive map of Caso
- Location in Spain
- Coordinates: 43°11′N 5°21′W
- Country: Spain
- Autonomous community: Asturias
- Province: Asturias
- Comarca: Nalón
- Judicial district: Laviana
- Capital: Campo de Caso

Government
  - Alcalde: Miguel Ángel Fernández (FSA-PSOE)

Area
  - Total: 307.94 km^{2} (118.90 sq mi)
- Highest elevation: 2,022 m (6,634 ft)

Population (2025-01-01)
  - Total: 1,437
  - Density: 4.666/km^{2} (12.09/sq mi)
- Demonym: casín
- Time zone: UTC+1 (CET)
  - Summer (DST): UTC+2 (CEST)
- Postal code: 33990 - 33999
- Website: Official website

Caso (Asturian: Casu) is a municipality in the Spanish Principality of Asturias. It shares a boundary to the North with Piloña; to the East with Ponga; to the South with León and to the West with Sobrescobio and Laviana.

Most of the inhabitants of Caso live in the Nalón Valley, on which the largest town is the capital El Campu. The town is divided in two neighbourhoods: L'Arrobiu and El Barru.

The municipalities of Caso and Sobrescobio together constitute the Redes Natural Park, designated by the UNESCO as a Biosphere Reserve. The Natural Monument of the Cueva Deboyu (the Nalón River passes through a cave in the mountain) is also located in Caso. Caso is famous for its landscape, European beech forests, wood handcraft and its Casín cheese.

In the past, most of Caso's people worked in coal mining and livestock farming. Nowadays, tourism has become one of the more important activities in Caso, but farming is still the most relevant.

The Dam of Tanes provides electric energy and drinking water to the central part of Asturias.

== Access ==
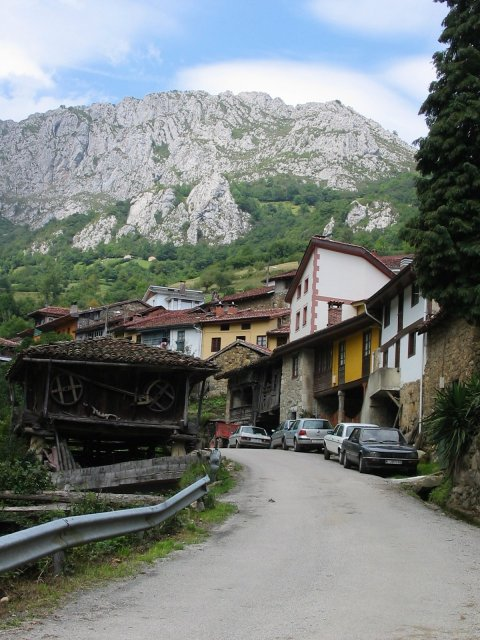
The town of Caleao

The AS-17 (Avilés - Pass of Tarna) road is the easiest form to reach Caso from Oviedo or Gijón. The AS-254 (El Campu - L'Infiestu) road connects Caso with Piloña and the N-634 road. Caso and León are connected by the Pass of Tarna. The nearest train station is located in Pola de Laviana.

== Parishes ==
- Bueres
- Caleao
- Campo de Caso
- Coballes
- Felguerina
- Orlé
- Sobrecastiello
- Tanes
- Tarna
- Tozo

== Representative fauna ==
- Brown bear
- Capercaillie
- Red deer
- Wolf
- Boar
- Chamois
- Roe deer
- Golden eagle
- Griffon vulture
- Fallow deer
- Trout

== Representative flora ==
- European beech
- Holly
- Oak
- Yew
- Birch
- Chestnut

== Feasts ==
- 24 June, Saint John the Baptist, El Campu
- 25 July, Saint James the Great, Bueres
- 6 August, San Salvador, Bezanes
- 8 August, Harvester's Feast, Caliao
- Last weekend of August, Casín Cheese's Contest, Collada de Arnicio (Gobezanes)
- 8 October, Cattle Market and Contest, El Campu

== Tourist attractions ==
The municipality is located in a wild and mountainous area in which there are plenty of hiking routes and natural places to visit:

- Arrudos Defile, in Caleao.
- Deboyu Cave, in Campo de Caso.
- Tabayón del Mongayu (waterfall), in Tarna.
- Brañagallones (shepherd's huts in the mountain), in Bezanes. Very nice prairie, surrounded by mounts where there are several old huts and a mountain lodge.

There is also some old churches and interesting civil constructions.

- Pandu Quarter (traditional asturian architecture), in Campo de Caso.
- Santa María la Real Church (16th century), in Tanes.
- Santa Cruz de la Real Church (Baroque altarpiece), in Caleao.
- Museo de la Madera y la Madreña (wood handcraft museum), in Veneros.
- Taller de la Madera y la Madreña (wood handcraft workshop), in Pendones.
- Redes Visitor Centre, in Campo de Caso.

== See also ==
- List of municipalities in Asturias
