= Oviñana =

Oviñana can refer to:

- Oviñana (Cudillero), parish in Cudillero, Asturias, Spain
- Oviñana (Sobrescobio), parish in Sobrescobio, Asturias, Spain
