= Entrialgo =

Coordinates: 43°14′6.6474″N 5°33′16.8114″W

Entrialgo Entralgo (Spanish)
- Parish
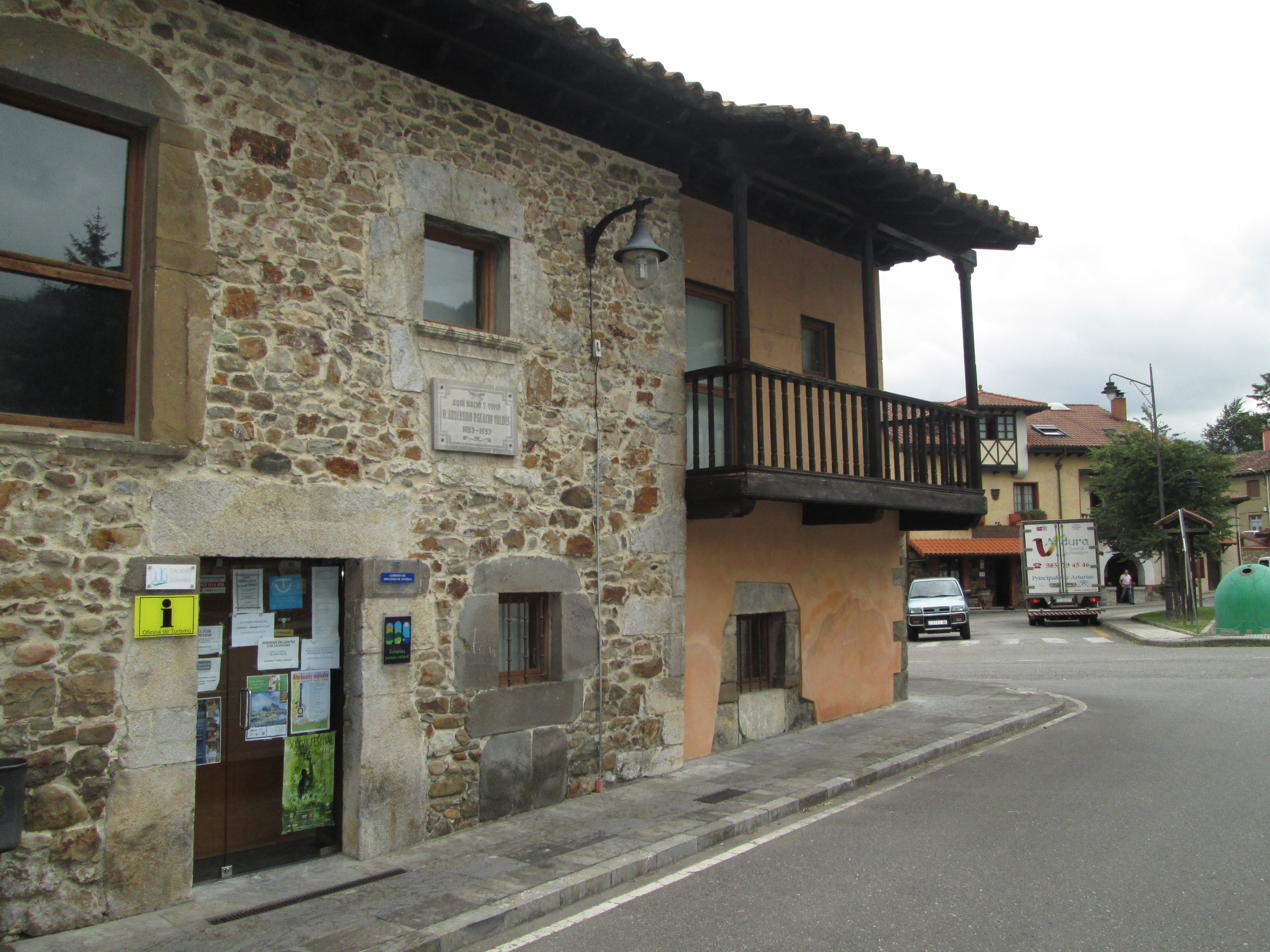
- Place of birth and museum of Armando Palacio Valdés
- Interactive map of Entrialgo
- Country: Spain
- Autonomous community: Asturias
- Province: Asturias
- Municipality: Laviana

Population
  - Total: 250

Entrialgo (Entralgo in Spanish) is one of the nine parishes in Laviana, a municipality within the province and autonomous community of Asturias, in northern Spain. The population as of 2011 is 250 people and it has a surface of 6,87 km^{2}.

== Location ==
Between the AS-17 and AS-52 roads, Entrialgo is located two kilometers from Pola de Laviana, the capital of the municipality.

== Villages and hamlets ==
- Canzana
- Entrialgo (known as the place of birth of writer Armando Palacio Valdés)
- El Meruxalín
- La Peruyal
- La Boza
- Mardana
- Los Cuarteles

Other small entities:

- La Casa'l Regueru
- La Chalana (widely known for its bridge and the Descenso Folclórico del Nalón)
- La Curuxera
- Les Llanes
- La Segá
- Tambarriegues

== Notable people ==
- Armando Palacio Valdés, writer
