= Tarna =

Tarna may refer to:

== People ==
- Nicu Țărnă (born 1977), Moldovan musician, actor, songwriter, showman and TV presenter

== Places ==
- Tarna, Kardzhali Province, Bulgaria
- Tarna (Caso), Spain
- Tarna Mare, Romania
- Tarna River, Hungary

== Other ==
- Tarna Feir, character in the Wheel of Time series
- Tarna, the main city in the video game Quest for Glory III: Wages of War
