= Laviana =

Laviana Llaviana
- Municipality
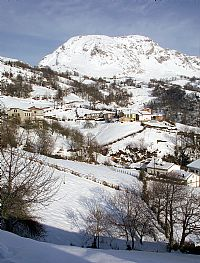
- Peñamayor Mountain, at Llaviana.

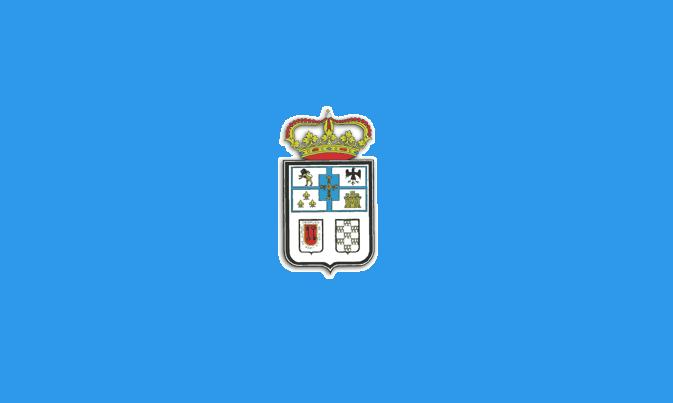
- Flag Coat of arms

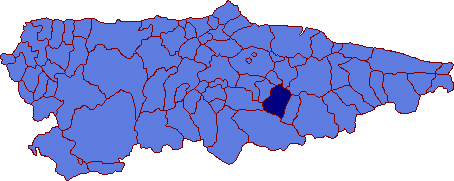

- Location in Spain
- Coordinates: 43°14′8.74″N 5°33′22.5″W
- Country: Spain
- Autonomous community: Asturias
- Province: Asturias
- Comarca: Nalón
- Capital: Pola de Laviana

Government
  - Alcalde: Julio García Rodríguez (PSOE)

Area
  - Total: 130.99 km^{2} (50.58 sq mi)
- Highest elevation: 1,560 m (5,120 ft)

Population (2025-01-01)
  - Total: 12,352
  - Density: 94.297/km^{2} (244.23/sq mi)
- Demonym: lavianés
- Time zone: UTC+1 (CET)
  - Summer (DST): UTC+2 (CEST)
- Postal code: 33970, 33979, 33980
- Official language(s): Bable, Spanish
- Website: Official website

Laviana (Asturian: Llaviana) is a municipality in the Autonomous Community of the Principality of Asturias, located in Spain. It is bordered on the north by Bimenes and Nava, on the south by Aller, on the east by Piloña and Sobrescobio, and on the west by San Martín del Rey Aurelio and Mieres.

Situated in the basin of the Rio Nalon, it is a terminal for the FC de Langreo railway, now part of FEVE, which connects it to the port of Gijón.

== Economy ==
Mining, agriculture, and stock-rearing have been the principal industries since the early 20th century.

== History ==
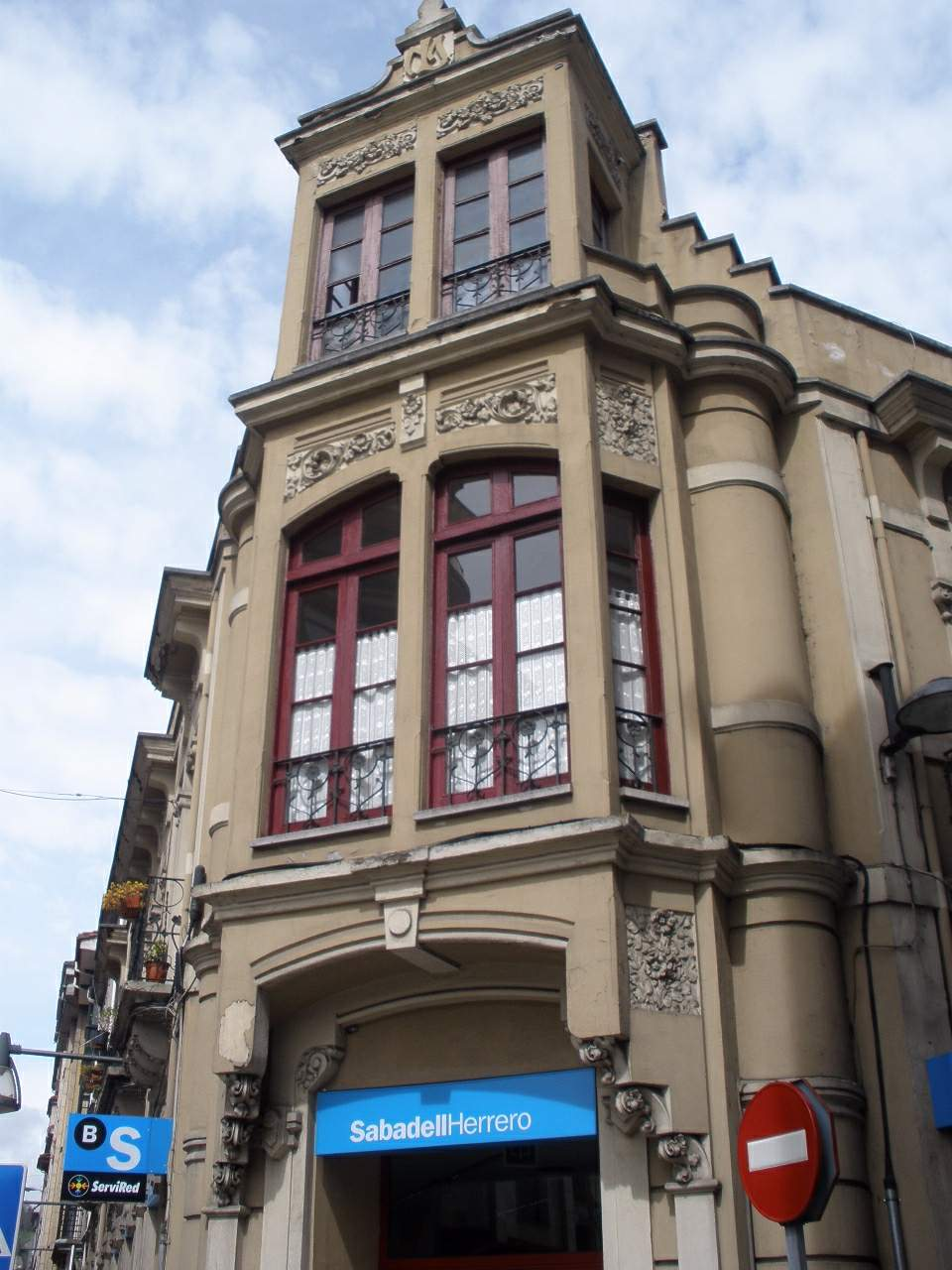
Pola de Laviana

Prehistoric signs are found almost everywhere in Asturias, including in the Laviana region. Several Hill Forts and Dolmen dating to the Bronze Age and Iron Age are still accessible (Castro de El Cercu, El Prau in Castiello and La Corona in Boroñes).
Additionally, the Romans built bridges along the Rio Nalon Street, which are still in use today.

The name Flaviana was first recorded in 1115, when the area bordered the Monastery of "San Vicente de Oviedo".
During the Peninsular War and the Carlism revolution, Laviana was the site of several notable battles.

=== Coat of arms ===
- Top left: Coat of Arms from family León > León
- Middle left: Coat of Arms from family León > France
- Bottom left: Coat of Arms from family Quirós
- Top right: Coat of Arms from family León > Holy Roman Empire (Austria)
- Middle right: Coat of Arms from family León > Castile
- Bottom right: Coat of Arms from family Alvarez de las Asturias
- The middle: the Victorycross

== Demography ==
Historical population
Year	1991	1996	2001	2004	2007
Pop.	15,204	15,105	14,531	14,373	14,312
±%	—	−0.7%	−3.8%	−1.1%	−0.4%

== Politics ==
The current mayor of Llaviana is Julio García Rodríguez (FSA-PSOE), in office since 20 October 2017.

Local elections
Party/List	1979	1983	1987	1991	1995	1999	2003	2007	2011	2015
FSA-PSOE	8	10	7	7	7	8	8	8	8	8
PCE / IU-BA / IU-The Greens	5	4	5	6	6	3	4	3	3	4
Somos										2
CD / AP / PP		3	1	2	4	4	4	5	3	2
FAC									3	1
PAS / URAS-PAS					0	1	0	1	0	
URAS / URAS-PAS						1	1	1	0	
UCD / CDS	4		1	1						
GIL			3	1						
Total	17	17	17	17	17	17	17	17	17	17

== Points of interest ==
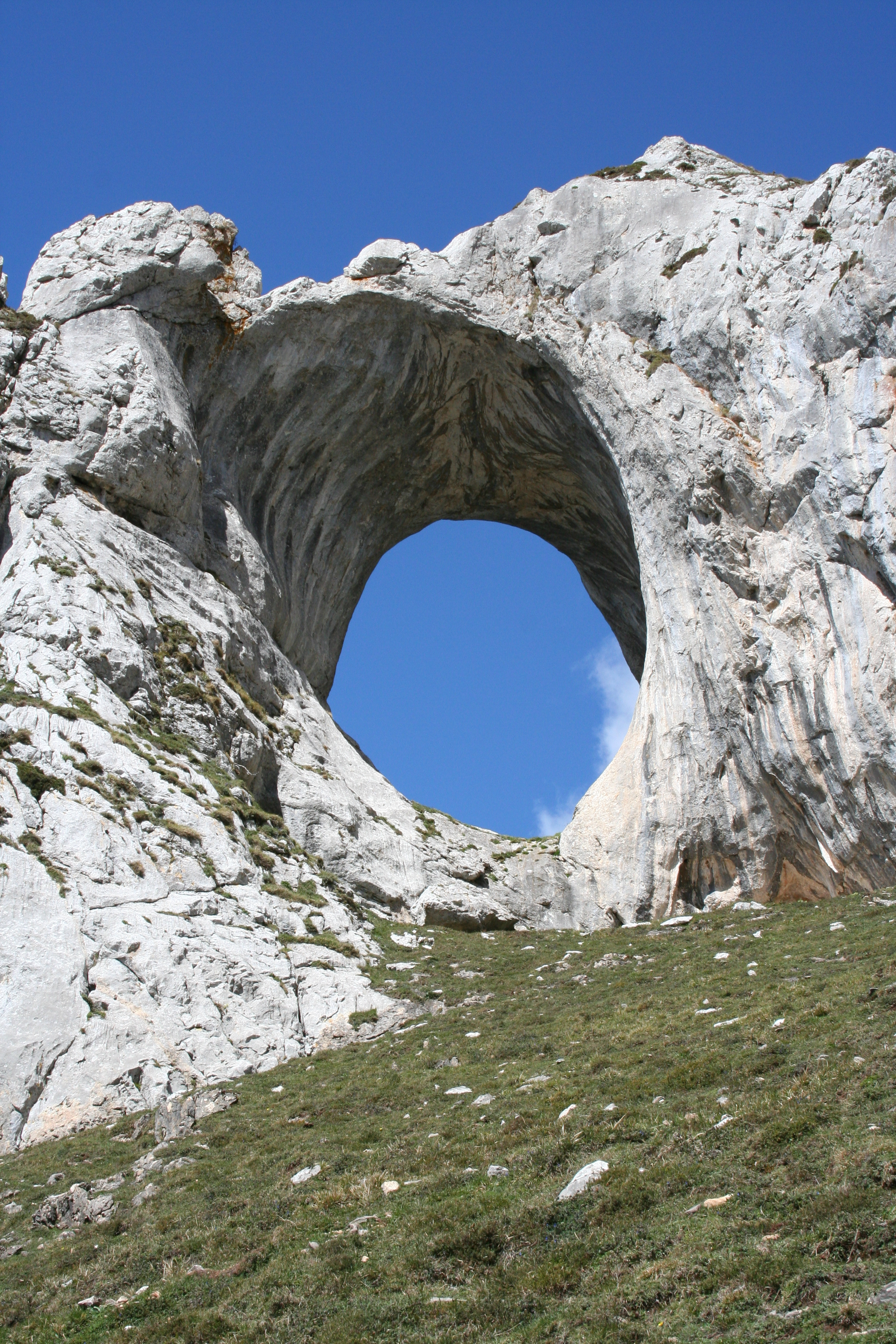
Ojo de buey in Peña Mea, Llaviana (Asturies)

- Iglesia (Church) de San Nicolás (from the 12th century)
- Iglesia de Nuestra Señor de Otero
- La Casona de los Menéndez (cheese production)
- also take a look into the website Monumentos

== Fiesta and feria ==
Special events take place in the region almost every month; important dates can be found on the website ´´Fiestas´´

== Parroquias (parishes) ==
Parroquia	Population (2014)	Males	Females
Carrio	123	54	69
El Condado/El Condao	596	302	294
Entralgo	245	120	125
Lorio	682	313	369
Pola de Laviana	9151	4372	4779
Tiraña	1804	888	916
Tolivia	187	91	96
Villoria	1003	478	525

== Famous people ==
- Armando Palacio Valdés, writer
- Los Berrones, agro-rock group
- Roberto Canella, football player
- Viti Rozada, football player

== See also ==
- List of municipalities in Asturias
