= Sobrecastiellu =

Parish in Caso, Asturias, Spain

- Parish
- Location within Spain
- Coordinates: 43.1541°N 5.3021°W
- Country: Spain
- Autonomous community: Asturias
- Province: Asturias
- Municipality: Caso

Sobrecastiellu is one of ten parishes (administrative divisions) in Caso, a municipality within the province and autonomous community of Asturias, in northern Spain.

The parroquia is 89.05 km^{2} (34.38 sq mi) in size, with a population of 469 (INE 2006). The postal code is 33996.

== Villages and hamlets ==
Sobrecastiellu, which in asturian means uppercastle, is composed by the following villages and hamlets:

- Belerda
- Bezanes
- La Foz
- Pendones
- Sotu
