= El Campu =

- Parish
- Interactive map of El Campu
- Location within Spain
- Coordinates: 43.183333°N 5.35°W
- Country: Spain
- Autonomous community: Asturias
- Province: Asturias
- Municipality: Caso

El Campu (Spanish: Campo de Caso) is one of ten parishes (administrative divisions) in Caso, a municipality within the province and autonomous community of Asturias, in northern Spain.

The parroquia is 13.22 km^{2} (5.10 sq mi) in size, with a population of 412 (INE 2007). The postal code is 33990.

== Villages and hamlets ==
- El Barru
- El Campu
- Veneros

=== Other small places ===
- El Barriquín
- L'Arrobiu
- L'Azorea
- La Yana
- Les Yanes
- Moñu
