= Tañes =

- Parish
- Location within Spain
- Coordinates: 43.2°N 5.4°W
- Country: Spain
- Autonomous community: Asturias
- Province: Asturias
- Municipality: Caso

Tañes (Spanish: Tanes) is a parish (administrative division) in Caso, a municipality within the province and autonomous community of Asturias, in northern Spain.

The parroquia is 23.1 km^{2} (8.9 sq mi) in size, with a population of 215 (INE 2006). The postal code is 33994.

== Villages and hamlets ==
- Abantru
- Prieres
- Tañes
