= Villoria (Laviana) =

- Parish
- Location within Spain
- Country: Spain
- Autonomous community: Asturias
- Province: Asturias
- Municipality: Laviana

Population (2011)
  - Total: 1,079

Villoria is one of nine parishes (administrative divisions) in Laviana, a municipality within the province and autonomous community of Asturias, in northern Spain.

== Villages ==
- Arbín
- La Barrosa
- Les Bories
- Brañifraes
- La Boza
- Braña Baxo
- Braña Riba
- Bustiello
- El Cabu
- Campumayáu
- La Caúcia
- El Cerezaliru
- El Collaín
- El Colláu
- Corián
- El Corazal
- La Correoria
- El Fabariegu
- Faiseques
- Febreru
- Fechaladrona
- Fonfría
- Los Fornos
- Grandiella
- Grandón
- La Llosagra
- El Llosón
- El Meruxal
- Les Mestres
- Migalpiri
- La Paraína
- Piedresnegres
- El Pisón
- La Pumará
- Les Quintanes
- La Reodina
- Reondo
- El Ribayón
- El Rosil
- Sampedro Villoria
- Sograndiella
- Solano Baxo
- Solano Riba
- Tablazo
- Tarrucio
- El Tendiyón
- Los Tornos
- Valdelafaya
- Vallicastañal
- Los Veneros
- Villoria
- Viscozá
- Los Veneros
