= Carrio =

- Parish
- Location within Spain
- Coordinates: 43.25°N 5.566667°W
- Country: Spain
- Autonomous community: Asturias
- Province: Asturias
- Municipality: Laviana

Carrio is one of nine parishes (administrative divisions) in Laviana, a municipality within the province and autonomous community of Asturias, in northern Spain.
