= Llorío =

- Parish
- Location within Spain
- Country: Spain
- Autonomous community: Asturias
- Province: Asturias
- Municipality: Laviana

Llorío is one of nine parishes (administrative divisions) in Llaviana, a municipality within the province and autonomous community of Asturias, in northern Spain.

== Villages ==
- L'Acebal
- La Cabaña
- Ciargüelo
- La Fomermeya
- Iguanzo
- La Llera
- Muñera
- Pando
- Payandi
- El Puente d'Arcu
- Ribota
- Soto
- La Canterona
- La Curuxera
