= Llaíñes =

Parish (parroquia) in Sobrescobio, Asturias, Spain

Coordinates: 43.2°N 5.45°W

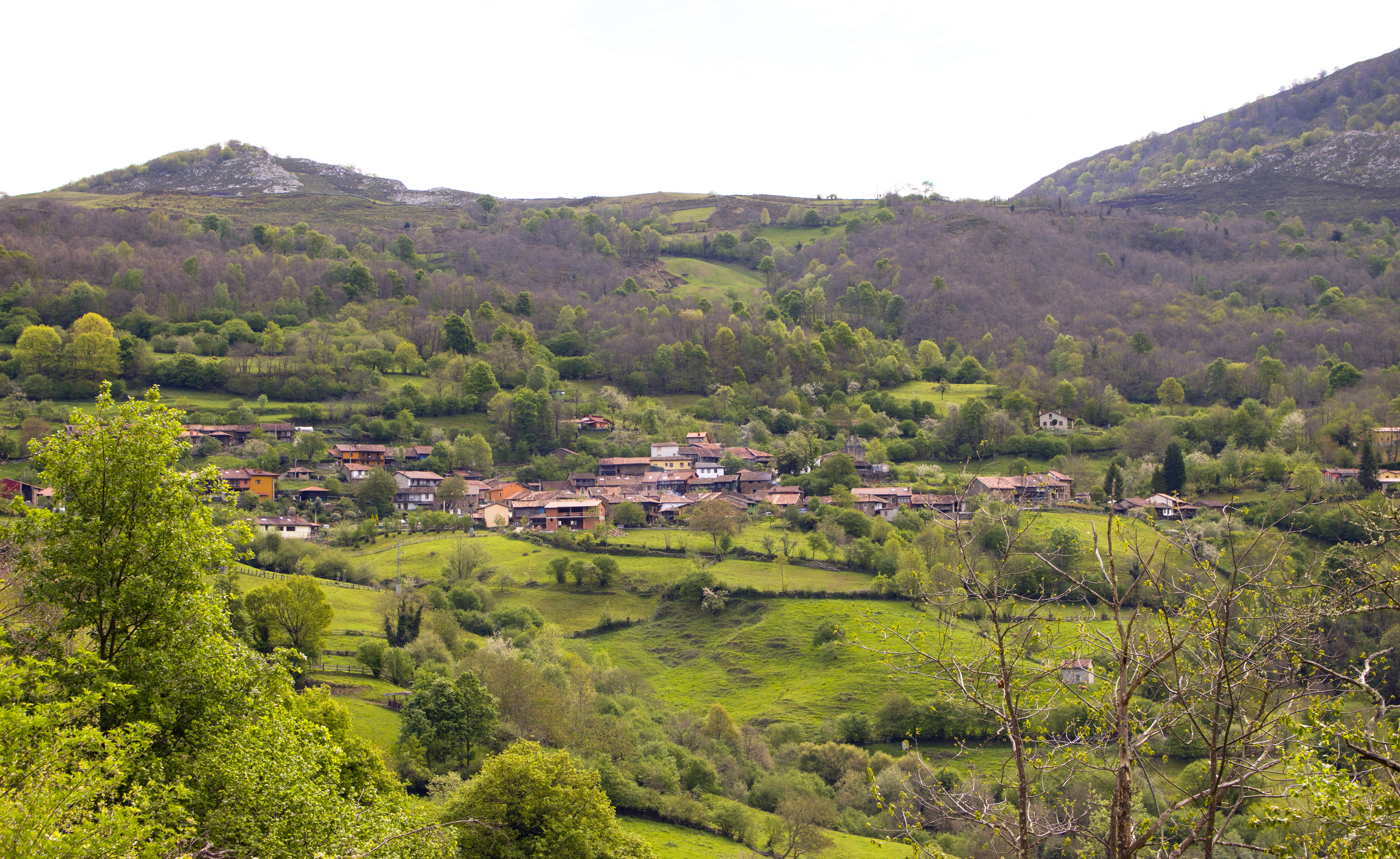
Ladines (Sobrescobio, Asturias)

Llaíñes (Spanish: Ladines, officially Llaíñes/Ladines) is one of three parishes (administrative divisions) in Sobrescobio, a municipality within the province and autonomous community of Asturias, in northern Spain. People from Llaíñes are called caresinos.

It is 14.07 km^{2} (5.43 sq mi) in size, with a population of 51 (INE 2005).
