= Caliao =

- Parish
- Location within Spain
- Coordinates: 43.15°N 5.416667°W
- Country: Spain
- Autonomous community: Asturias
- Province: Asturias
- Municipality: Caso

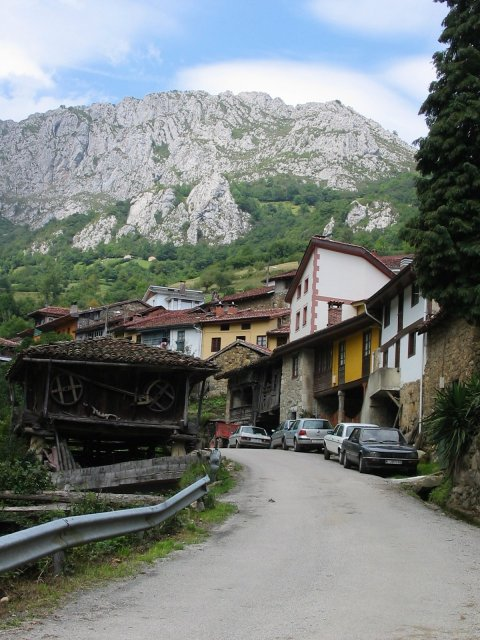
View of Caliao.

Caliao (Spanish: Caleao) is one of ten parishes (administrative divisions) in Caso, a municipality within the province and autonomous community of Asturias, in northern Spain.

The parroquia is 49.97 km^{2} (19.29 sq mi) in size, with a population of 173 (INE 2007). The postal code is 33995.

== Places ==
- El Balséu
- La Braña Uxil
- La Braña Vieya
- La Cabritera
- Les Cases d'Abaxu
- Los Collaos
- El Cotu
- La Encruceyada
- Les Felguerines
- Fresnéu
- La Fresnosa
- Los Oyancos
- Pandefresnu
- Prendeoriu
- Riafresnu
- La Vega'l Cándanu
