= Bueres =

- Parish
- Location within Spain
- Coordinates: 43.2101°N 5.3506°W
- Country: Spain
- Autonomous community: Asturias
- Province: Asturias
- Municipality: Caso

Bueres is one of ten parishes (administrative divisions) in Caso, a municipality within the province and autonomous community of Asturias, in northern Spain.

Situated at 700 m (2,300 ft) above sea level, it is 27.17 km^{2} (10.49 sq mi) in size with a population of 166 (INE 2007). The postal code is 33990.

== Villages ==
- Bueres
- Gobezanes
- Nieves
