= Coballes =

- Parish
- Location within Spain
- Coordinates: 43.2°N 5.383333°W
- Country: Spain
- Autonomous community: Asturias
- Province: Asturias
- Municipality: Caso

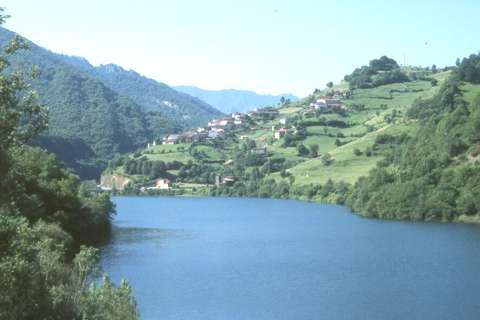
Coballes

Coballes (Asturian: Coballes) is one of ten parishes (administrative divisions) in Caso, a municipality within the province and autonomous community of Asturias, in northern Spain.

Situated at 741 m (2,431 ft) above sea level, the parroquia is 8.65 km^{2} (3.34 sq mi) in size, with a population of 107 (INE 2007). The postal code is 33995.

== Villages and hamlets ==
- Buspriz
- Coballes
