= La Felguerina =

- Parish
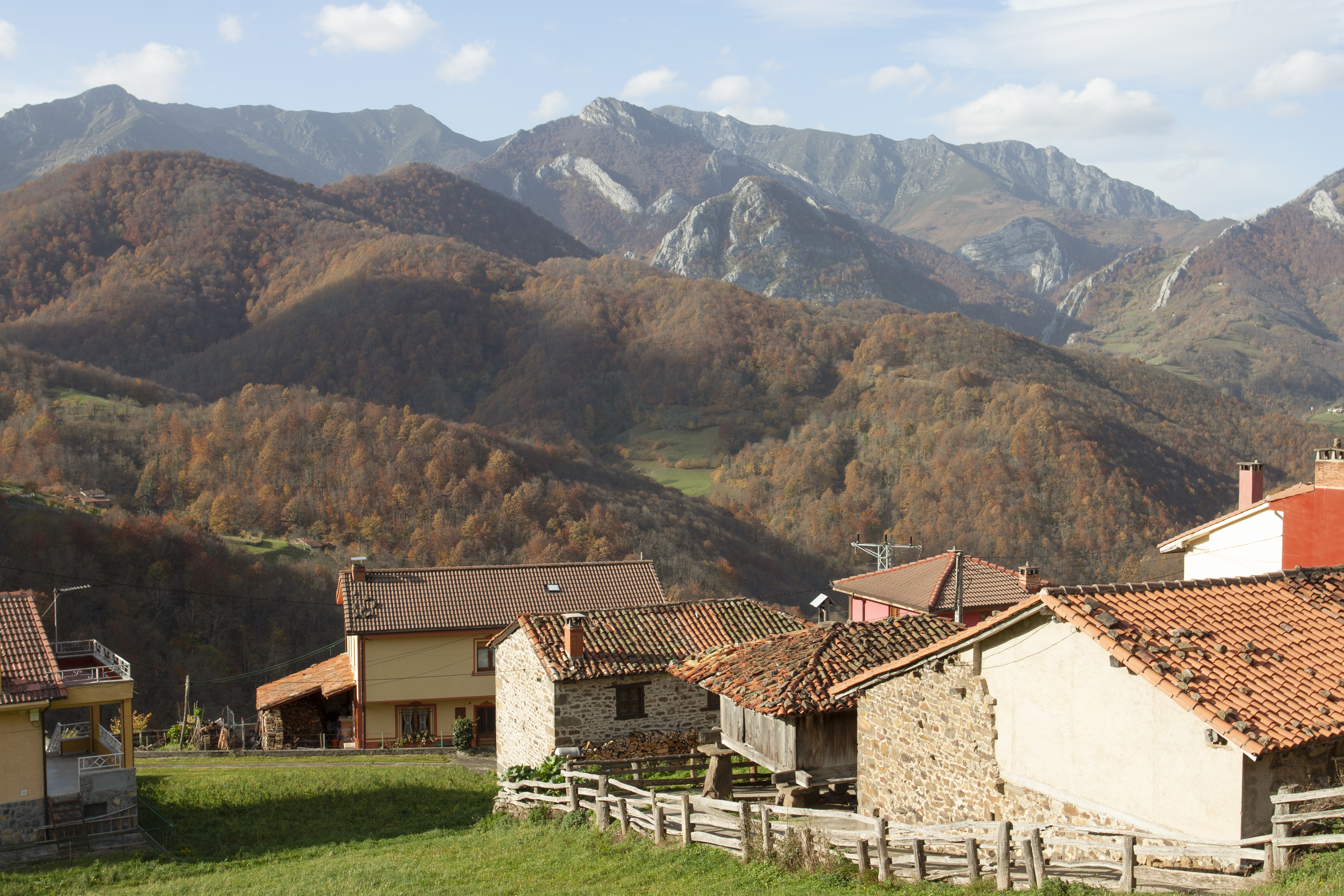

- Location within Spain
- Coordinates: 43.15°N 5.3667°W
- Country: Spain
- Autonomous community: Asturias
- Province: Asturias
- Municipality: Caso

La Felguerina is one of ten parishes (administrative divisions) in Caso, a municipality within the province and autonomous community of Asturias, in northern Spain.

Situated at 840 m (2,760 ft) above sea level, the parroquia is 11.8 km^{2} (4.6 sq mi) in size, with a population of 101 (INE 2007). The postal code is 33995.

== Villages ==
- La Felguerina
- Brañafría
- El Burgosu
- El Pandu
- El Vallín
- La Cabañona
- La Cuesta
- La Infiesta
- Peréu
- Ricao
- Valquemáu
- Zamploña
