= Tolivia =

- Parish
- Location within Spain
- Coordinates: 43.2°N 5.583333°W
- Country: Spain
- Autonomous community: Asturias
- Province: Asturias
- Municipality: Laviana

Tolivia is one of nine parishes (administrative divisions) in Laviana, a municipality within the province and autonomous community of Asturias, in northern Spain.

== Villages ==
- La Cuesta Baxo
- La Cuesta Riba
- Fresneo
- Valdelafaya
- Valsemana
- Les Palombes
- La Bárgana
- La Cuesta los Valles
- El Navaliegu
- La Brañivieya
