= Orllé =

Parish in Caso, Asturias, Spain

Orlé
- Parish
- Location within Spain
- Coordinates: 43.197222°N 5.325556°W
- Country: Spain
- Autonomous community: Asturias
- Province: Asturias
- Municipality: Caso

Orlé (Spanish: Orlé) is one of ten parishes (administrative divisions) in Caso, a municipality within the province and autonomous community of Asturias, in northern Spain.

Situated at 660 m (2,170 ft) above sea level, the parroquia is 33.08 km^{2} (12.77 sq mi) in size, with a population of 145 (INE 2006). The postal code is 33990.
