= Soto (Sobrescobio) =

Parish (parroquia) in Sobrescobio, Asturias, Spain

- Parish
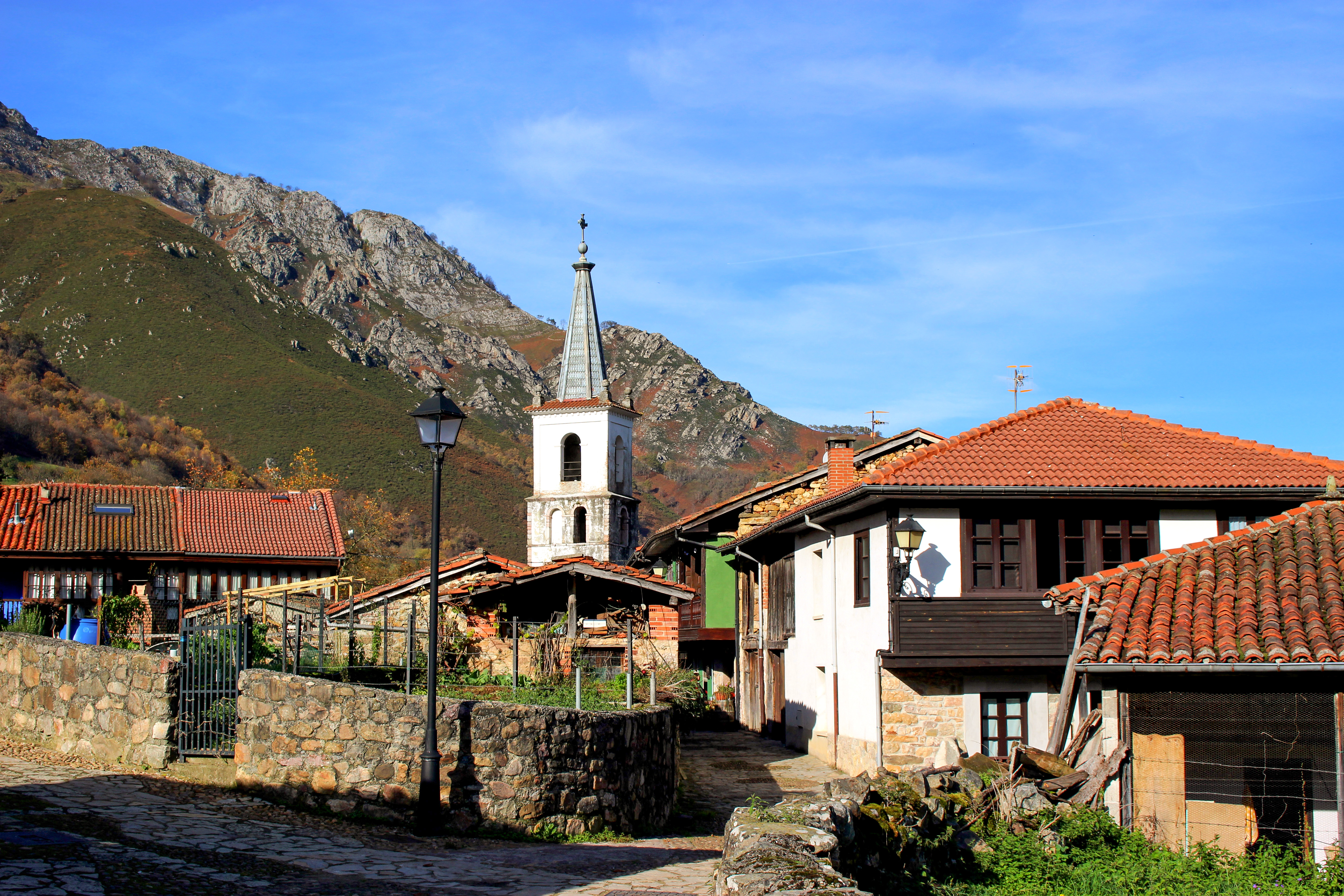

- Location within Asturias
- Coordinates: 43°12′06″N 5°27′35″W

Soto (also Soto d'Agues) is one of three parishes (administrative divisions) in Sobrescobio, a municipality within the province and autonomous community of Asturias, in northern Spain.

It is 35.63 km^{2} (13.76 sq mi) in size, with a population of 274 (INE 2005).

== Villages ==
- Agues
- Soto
- San Andrés
