= Armando Palacio Valdés =

Spanish novelist (1853–1938)

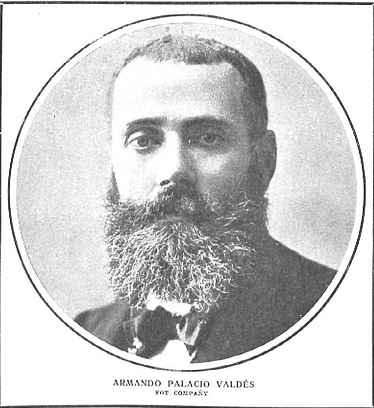
- Photograph from Nuevo Mundo by Manuel Compañy
- Born: Armando Francisco Bonifacio Palacio y Rodríguez-Valdés; 4 October 1853; Entralgo, Spain
- Died: 29 January 1938 (aged 84); Madrid, Spain
- Writing career
- Language: Spanish
- Genres: novels, short stories

Seat k of the Real Academia Española
- In office 12 December 1920 (Note: Elected on 3 May 1906) – 29 January 1938
- Preceded by: José María de Pereda
- Succeeded by: Ángel González Palencia

Armando Francisco Bonifacio Palacio y Rodríguez-Valdés (4 October 1853 – 29 January 1938) was a Spanish novelist and critic.

== Biography ==
Palacio was born at Entrialgo in the province of Asturias on 4 October 1853, eldest son of Silverio Palacio y Cárcaba, a lawyer, and Eduarda Rodríguez-Valdés y Alas, an aristocrat. His brothers, Atanasio and Leopoldo, also were writers.

His first writings were printed in the Revista Europea. These were pungent essays, remarkable for independent judgment and refined humour, and found so much favor with the public that the young beginner was soon appointed editor of the Revista. The best of his critical work is collected in Los Oradores del Ateneo (1878), Los Novelistas españoles (1878), Nuevo viaje al Parnaso and La Literatura en 1881 (1882), this last being written in collaboration with Leopoldo Alas.

In 1881 he published a novel, El señorito Octavio, which shows an uncommon power of observation, and the optimistic promise of better things to come. In Marta y Maria (1883), a portrayal of the struggle between religious vocation and earthly passion, somewhat in the manner of Valera, Palacio Valdés achieved a popular triumph.

According to a contemporaneous assessment by James Fitzmaurice-Kelly in the Encyclopædia Britannica Eleventh Edition:

El Idilio de un enfermo (1884), a most interesting fragment of autobiography, has scarcely met with the recognition which it deserves: perhaps because the pathos of the story is too unadorned. The publication of Peredas Sotileza is doubtless responsible for the conception of José (1885), in which Palacio Valdés gives a realistic picture of the manners and customs of seafaring folk, creates the two convincing characters whom he names José and Leonarda, and embellishes the whole with passages of animated description barely inferior to the finest penned by Pereda himself. The emotional imagination of the writer expressed itself anew in the charming story Riverita (1886), one of whose attractive characters develops into the heroine of Maximina (1887); and from Maximina, in its turn, is taken the novice who figures as a professed nun among the personages of La Hermana San Sulpicio (1889), in which the love-passages between Zeferino Sanjurjo and Gloria Bermúdez are set off with elaborate, romantic descriptions of Seville. El Cuarto poder (1888) is, as its name implies, concerned with the details, not always edifying, of journalistic life. Two novels issued in 1892, La Espuma and La Fe, were enthusiastically praised in foreign countries, but in Spain their reception was cold ... Subsequently Palacio Valdés returned to his earlier and better manner in Los Majos de Cádiz (1896) and in La Alegría del Capitán Ribot (1899). In these novels, and still more in Tristán, ó el pesimismo (1906), he frees himself from the reproach of undue submission to French influences. In any case he takes a prominent place in modern Spanish literature as a keen analyst of emotion and a sympathetic, delicate, humorous observer.

Palacio was elected to seat k of the Real Academia Española on 3 May 1906, he took up his seat on 12 December 1920.

A collection of his short stories appeared in English translation in 1935.

== Works ==
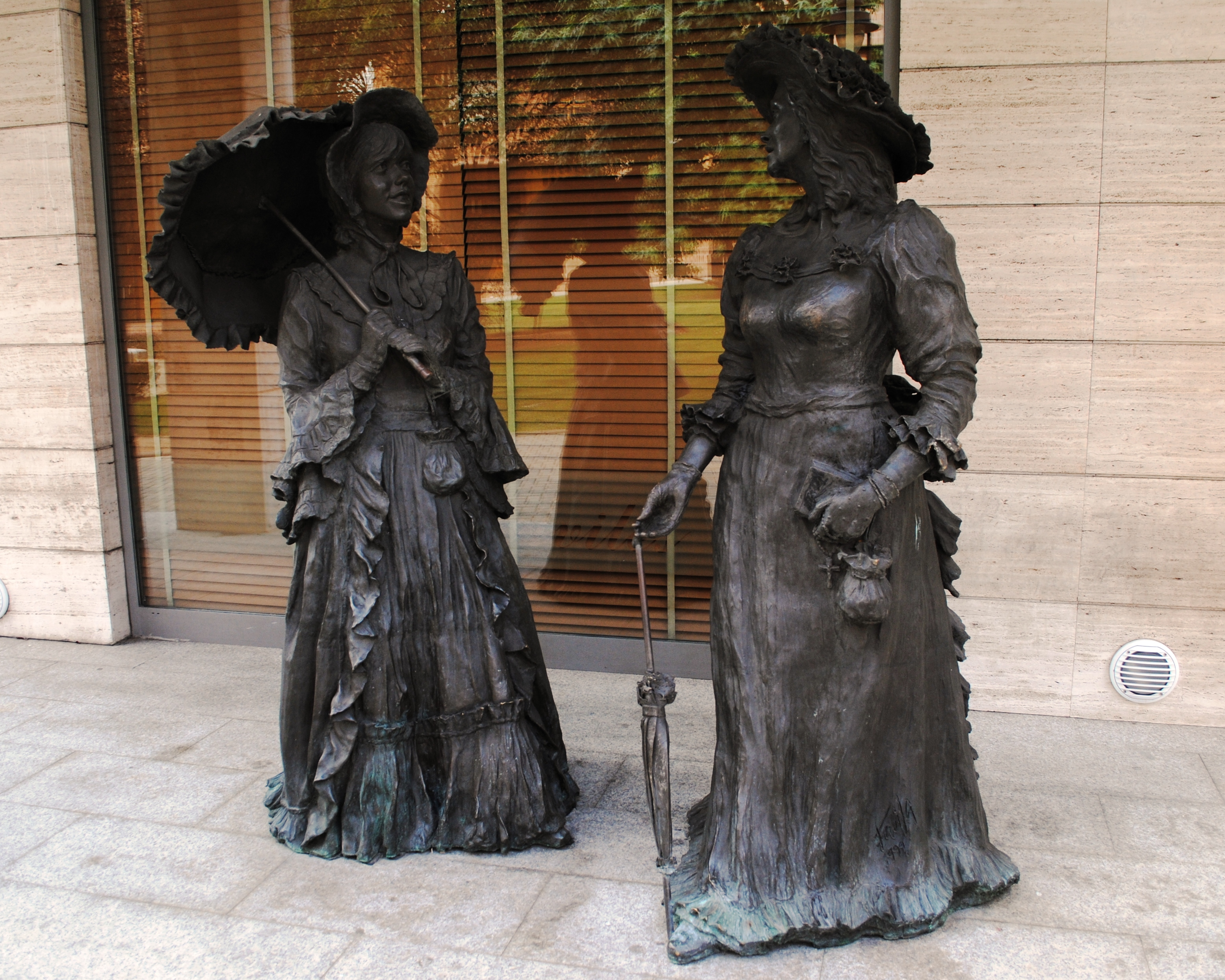
Marta y María, by Amado González Hevia, known as "Favila"

- Semblanzas literarias (1871)
- Los oradores del Ateneo (1878)
- El nuevo viaje al Parnaso (1879)
- La literatura en (1881), with Leopoldo Alas
- El señorito Octavio (1881)
- Marta y María (1883)
- Aguas fuertes (1884)
- El idilio de un enfermo (1884)
- José (1885)
- Riverita (1886)
- Maximina (1887)
- El cuarto poder (1888)
- La hermana San Sulpicio (1889)
- La espuma (1890)
- La espuma (1891)
- La fe (1892)
- El maestrante (1893)
- El Orígen del Pensamiento(1893)
- Los majos de Cádiz (1896)
- La alegría del capitán Ribot (1899) ("The Joy of Captain Ribot", 1900)
- Tristán o el pesimismo (1906)
- La aldea perdida (1911)
- Los papeles del doctor Angélico (1911)
- Años de juventud del doctor Angélico (1918)
- La novela de un novelista (1921)
- Cuentos escogidos (1923)
- La hija de Natalia (1924)
- El pájaro en la nieve y otros cuentos (1925)
- Santa Rogelia (1926)
- Los cármenes de Granada (1927)
- Testamento literario (1929)
- Sinfonía pastoral (1930)
- El gobierno de las mujeres (1931)
- Obras completas (1935)
- Álbum de un viejo (1940)
- El Crimen en Calle de la Perseguida (Unknown)

== See also ==
=== In English ===
- Literary realism: General vision of the movement
- Spanish literature: Evolution of Spanish literature

=== In Spanish ===
- wikisource:es:Armando Palacio Valdés
- es:Literatura española del Realismo
