= Condado, Paraíba =

Coordinates: 6°54′36″S 37°36′03″W

- Municipality
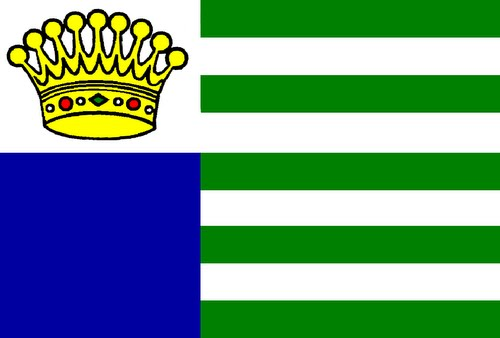
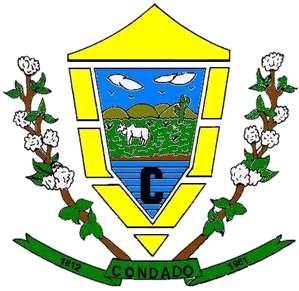
- Flag Coat of arms
- Interactive map of Condado, Paraíba
- Country: Brazil
- Region: Northeast
- State: Paraíba
- Mesoregion: Sertao Paraibana

Population (2020)
  - Total: 6,658
- Time zone: UTC−3 (BRT)

Condado, Paraíba is a municipality in the state of Paraíba in the Northeast Region of Brazil.

== See also ==
- List of municipalities in Paraíba
