= Oviñana (Sobrescobio) =

Parish (parroquia) in Sobrescobio, Asturias, Spain

Coordinates: 43.2207°N 5.4549°W

Oviñana is one of three parishes (administrative divisions) in Sobrescobio, a municipality within the province and autonomous community of Asturias, in northern Spain.

It is 35.66 km^{2} (13.77 sq mi) in size, with a population of 564 (INE 2011). The postal code is 33993.

== Villages ==
- Anzó
- Campiellos
- Comiyera
- La Polina
- Rusecu/Rioseco
- Villamoréi
- La Molina
