= Cuitlahuac Condado Escamilla =

Mexican politician

- Born: 1 January 1978 (age 48); Acayucan, Veracruz, Mexico
- Occupation: Politician
- Political party: PRD

Cuitlahuac Condado Escamilla (born 1 January 1978) is a Mexican politician from the Party of the Democratic Revolution. From 2006 to 2009 he served as Deputy of the LX Legislature of the Mexican Congress representing Veracruz.
