= El Condao =

- Parish
- Location within Spain
- Coordinates: 43°14′13″N 5°30′14″W
- Country: Spain
- Autonomous community: Asturias
- Province: Asturias
- Municipality: Laviana

El Condao (Spanish: Condado) is one of nine parishes (administrative divisions) in Laviana, a municipality within the province and autonomous community of Asturias, in northern Spain.

== Villages ==
- L'Aldea
- Boroñes
- El Condao
- La Ferrera
- La Xerra
