= Asturian Valley cattle =

Breed of cattle

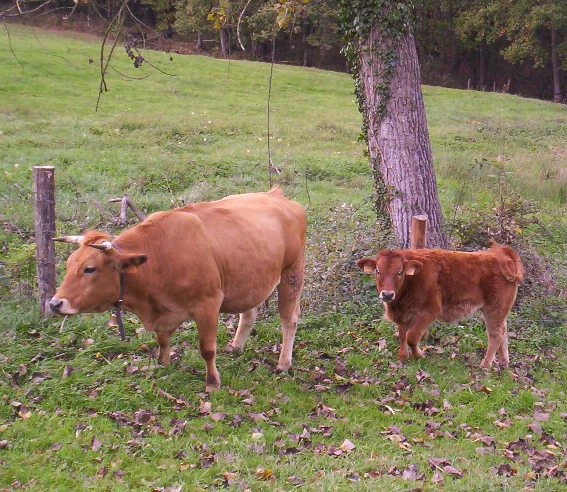
Vaca Asturiana de los Valles

Asturian Valley cattle originate from the valleys of Asturias, Spain. They are mostly raised in the northern coastal areas on the Bay of Biscay and the river valleys at the foot of the Cordillera Cantábrica mountain range. This breed belongs to an exclusive bovine group in Spain known as the tronco Cantábrico ('Cantabric trunk') that only includes breeds native to northern Spain; it also includes the Asturian Valley cattle. of all those breeds, Asturian Valley maintain the largest number. Traditionally the cattle were used for milk, meat, and work. Since other milk breeds have been introduced to Spain, their prominence has declined in the dairy industry. They remain one of three breeds that may be used to produce Casín cheese.

== History ==
Asturian Valley cattle are native to northern Spain and are thought to have been bred and raised in the valleys of Asturias, Spain. By the 19th century, they were the most abundant breed in northern Spain. At the beginning of the 20th century, a massive invasion of foreign breeds dangerously lowered the numbers of Asturian Valley to about 22,000 head. During the 1980s, the Asociación Española de criadores de ganado vacuno selecto de la raza Asturiana de los Valles (ASEAVA, 'Spanish Association of breeders of selected cattle of the Asturian Valley breed', founded in 1981) and the Spanish government initiated motions to protect the breed. Now the breed is once again prominent in northern areas and spreading to other parts of Spain.

== Description ==
A typical animal weigh between 600 and 700 kilograms. Their color varies from dark brown to a light golden brown sometimes with a white head (apart from the eyes), underside of the abdomen. They are most appreciated for high quality of meat and milk rich in fat and protein.

== See also ==
- List of cattle breeds
