= Iglesia de Santa María (Tanes) =

Coordinates: 43°12′26″N 5°24′12″W

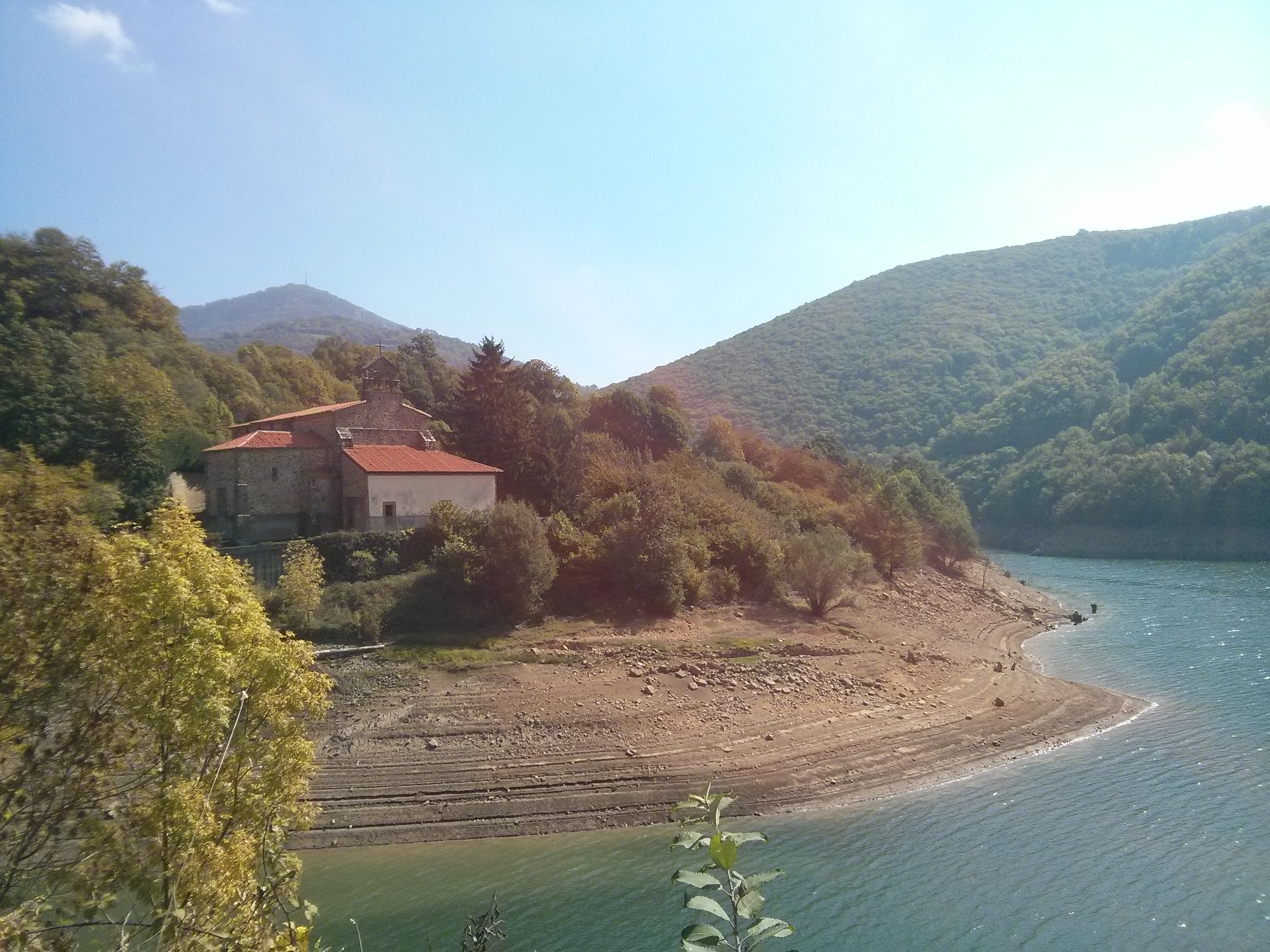
- Iglesia de Santa María (Tanes)
- Location: Asturias, Spain

Iglesia de Santa María (Tanes) is a church in Asturias, Spain.
