= Tarna (Caso) =

- Parish
- Location within Spain
- Coordinates: 43.116667°N 5.233333°W
- Country: Spain
- Autonomous community: Asturias
- Province: Asturias
- Municipality: Caso

Tarna is one of ten parishes (administrative divisions) in Caso, a municipality within the province and autonomous community of Asturias, in northern Spain.

The population is 100 (INE 2006).

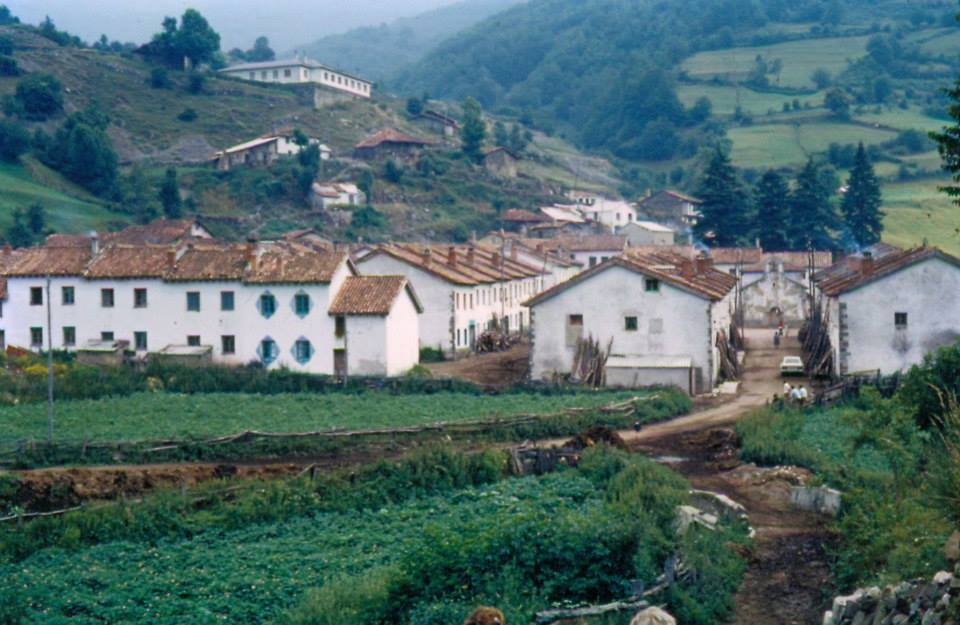
Tarna

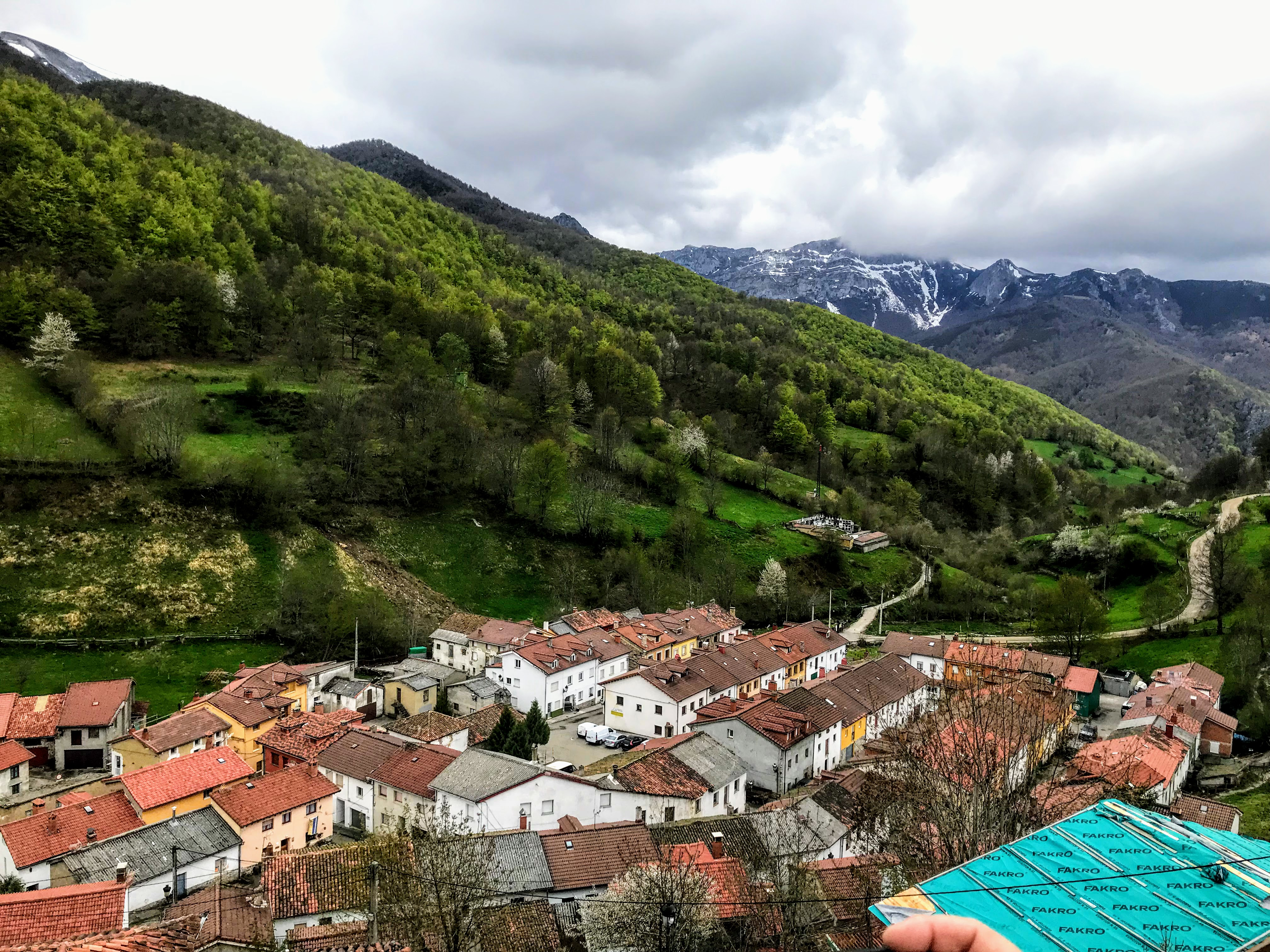
Tarna Village view

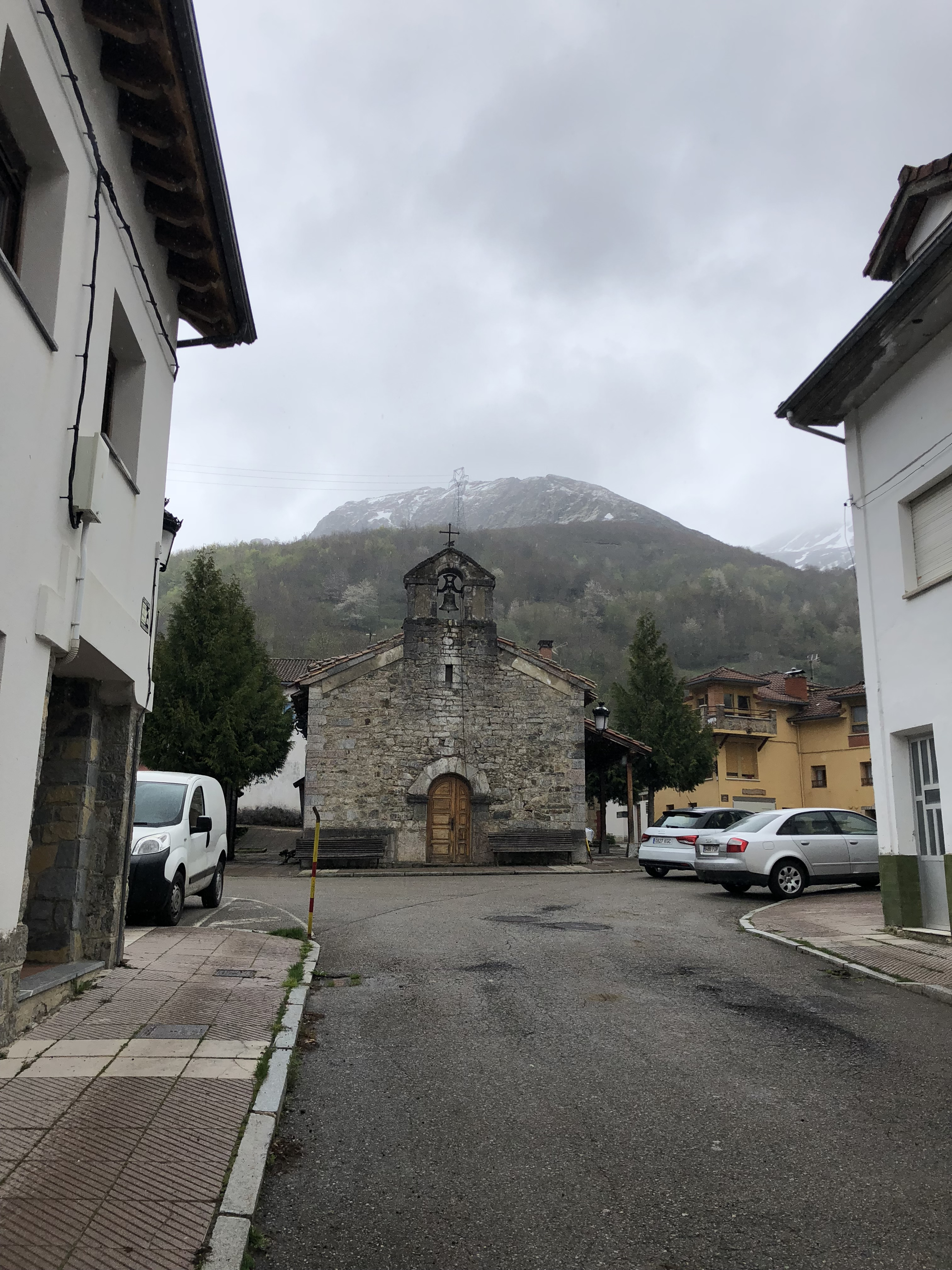
The village parish

== Tarna Before the Spanish Civil War ==
=== Origins ===
The origin of Tarna is not completely known, especially because the town has many Jewish surnames. It's believed that it may be an area founded by Sephardim, although its strategic position as a passage between the Cantabrian Coast and the Meseta suggests that the place could have some kind of occupation from the Cantabrian Wars or even in the pre-Roman era. This possibility is supported by the fact that there are nearby Roman influences, such as Campo de Caso and Puente de Arco. Unfortunately, there is no archaeological evidence to confirm this.

The earliest surviving reference to the town of Tarna is a donation letter from 1142 in which Alfonso VII donates the Villa de Tarna to his butler Martín Díaz.

Since the term "villa" was still used in the Roman sense, it's possible that Tarna was some kind of farm or a large house that dominated the area through agricultural exploitation.

=== Middle Ages ===
Due to geographical advantages during the High Middle Ages, Tarna was an early territory dominated by the Asturian Monarchy in the Reconquista. During the Late Middle Ages it continued to be a well-known region for agricultural and livestock. An early version of the Camino Real existed as a natural route. In historic texts, the town is occasionally called "Villa Tarana"

=== 18th Century ===
On December 9, 1774, Tarna was devastated after a violent flood. The Nalón River was naturally blocked for days and the reservoir was suddenly released, along with a large accumulation of logs and rocks. It’s documented in a letter sent to King Carlos III.

The request for help was answered through an aid of a thousand reales alms, which is documented in a letter from the Cathedral of Oviedo dated February 6.

A popular legend originated from the flood, saying that the Tarninos threw the image of their patron San Pedro into the river when in reality it was dragged by the flood to La Foz. A chapel was built there in 1786, where it is housed to this day.

The flood, known as “Argayu de los Picones”, was not only catastrophic for the Tarninos, but also had immediate repercussions on the Asturian communications system. The Marqués de Vista Alegre, attorney of the Caso council, wrote to the King in 1775 asking for help, arguing that the Camino Real de Tarna is key and must once again be passable for the greater good. This is evidence that the town was not an isolated place but a busy location that linked the coast and the plateau.

=== 19th Century ===
In the 19th century, Tarna participated in the Peninsular War against Napoleonic troops. In March 1809, royal troops stationed in Tarna, Maraña, and Sobrecastiello, and received a supply of food and supplies through a brigade made up of a neighbor from each town in the council.

At the start of 1810, Juan Díaz Porlier was part of the army of Asturias with about 1,000 men who made up the flying division called Cantabria. After a recent expedition through the La Rioja area, his group was stationed south of the Cantabrian Mountains, in the port of Tarna, near the border with León. By January 25, General Bonet's division, which had launched an offensive from Cantabria with some 5,300 men, had managed to occupy Llanes, Ribadesella, and Infiesto. In February of the same year, Porlier came from Tarna to Infiesto. He defeated a French detachment capturing many prisoners to cut off enemy communications with Cangas de Onís.

During the war against the French, Las Torres was fortified. In 1816, after the war, representatives of peoples from all over the council met in Tarna to discuss how to claim recognition for the services rendered

The cemetery is dated from 1834, which still exists today. It is located in the lower area of the town next to the river.

The Carlist Wars also had repercussions in Tarna, with the Almansa Regiment stationed there in 1836 Tarna was one of the “locations” of the famous “Gómez Expedition” of that year.

General Espartero tried to catch up with Gómez from the Leonese town of La Uña by crossing the field. Since he was unable to access the right paths to town, he had to withdraw.

A notable event in the mid-nineteenth century is the destruction of the Tarna Inn by an avalanche. The inn, which was located at the entrance of the town, was buried by snow in 1843 with several fatalities. As a result of this catastrophe, locals today refuse to build in the western part of the town.

=== 20th Century ===
The 20th century is marked by the strong emigration to the Americas that began at the end of the 19th century.

Various neighbors stand out, who managed to make their fortune in several Latin American countries and bring modern ideas to Tarna. From humble beginnings, many Tarninos managed to position themselves in those societies. They grew to be much more sophisticated and wealthy, becoming known as Indianos to Tarna. The residents who remained in the town maintained a modest but plentiful economy, which was supported by four areas:

- Tillage, with special importance of legumes and harvest, on which the livestock depended.
- Livestock, mainly cattle, but also horses, vital for transport, as well as the raising of farm animals such as pigs, chickens, and so on.
- Crafts, with a marked accent on the manufacture of madreñas, a product in which the town became a major exporter, both to other Asturian populations and to areas of the province of León, until well into the 1980s.
- Incipient service sector: Various "winches" that combined the function of bar, grocer, pension, and restaurant.

==== 1916-Villa Lucila - La Casona ====
One special case of the emigration from Tarna to the Americas and its effect on the town is constituted by the “Villa Lucila” farm built by Los Simones in 1916 in the corral known as “La Casona” (The name of La Casona already appears in documentation from 1758 and has nothing to do with the 1916 house, a popular source of confusion).

Its silhouette stood out in the town. It was a recognizable element that characterized Tarna for 20 years. It was a medium-sized villa, built by José Simón González, who designated it as a summer home. He had started working in a bakery in Cuba and later carried sacks. At that time he was running an important business network with his cousins José Simón Corral (who was nicknamed “Corralín” to differentiate him), Tomás Simón García and Pelayo Simón Santos.

The town was called Villa Lucila in honor of Lucila Simón Torres, wife of José Simón González, and it was commissioned to some builders from Sama. Since the current road dates from 1935, the construction materials were brought through the Camino Real, which in 1916 still acted as a “national highway” between the plateau and Asturias.

The house was notable for its total of five floors, at a time when most of the houses in Tarna had two floors. It was characterized by a strongly symmetrical design with a square plan, and the south face was a three-level gallery. This was a common design at the time, aimed at capturing solar energy and tempering the house.

The purpose of its large size was to accommodate several families at the same time. The Simones spent their summers in their native Tarna, and they even financed infrastructure projects, such as the public laundry and schools.

==== 192?-The Laundry Building ====
Throughout the 1920s, the Simones built the town's laundry (which still exists, adjacent to Villa Lucila). It is a simple, rectangular facility that allowed the neighbors to wash their clothes nearby, instead of the river.

==== 1929-The Schools ====
In 1929, Tarna received one of its notable facilities when the schools were built, financed by the Simon families. In the upper part of the town, a plinth of great proportions is terraced by means of a retaining wall in stone, still observable today, and on it, a building with a U-shaped plan is erected. This building suffered strong wear after the civil war when it was used to house the battalions of prisoners. It would be remade in 1957. The original building had a ‘boys wing’ and a ‘girls wing’, an outdoor patio for the summer and interior hall that served as recreation in winter. The 1929 building and the 1957 building can be externally differentiated in the composition of the south façade, facing the town, with a succession of semicircular arches.

==== 1935-The General Highway ====
In 1935, the general highway opened for traffic, a milestone that shortened and facilitated the connection between Asturias and Castilla. Compared to the Camino Real, this new road is a modern means perfectly suitable for road traffic, after long efforts to save the rugged orography of the area.

== Tarna in the Civil War ==
The Spanish Civil War had significant consequences for the people of Tarna and the physical buildings in town. On July 18, 1936, a part of the Army attempted a coup against the Republic but failed: Civil war broke out in Spain, and in a few days, two zones were clearly defined: One, to the power of the government, and another, to the power of the rebels. Tarna was in the republican zone, while the neighboring province of León fell almost entirely into the hands of the coup plotters. The strategic position of Port of Tarna faced heavy fighting between both armies, which led to the destruction of the town.

=== Initial stage ===
During the first days of battle, there was a rapid mobilization of the workers who managed to reduce the coup plotters in Asturias: Faced with the appearance that the coup had already passed, more than 2,000 Asturian militiamen immediately left towards León and Ponferrada, but Aranda, colonel of Oviedo, took advantage of that moment to rebel and launch their forces into the street. As a result, the city of Oviedo became surrounded by Aranda and his army inside.

Consequently, the Republican attempt to conquer León was postponed, and in a matter of weeks, the battlefront became stabilized parallel to the Cantabrian mountain range that included the Port of Tarna.

This line provided geographical advantages:

- Port of Leitariegos
- Vega de los Viejos
- San Pedro de Luna
- Magdalena area
- La Robla
- Tarna
- The Pontoon

Soon the republican forces militarily controlled the area of the Case Council including Tarna. Villa Lucila transitioned into a field hospital and command headquarters.

Throughout 1936, this front line maintained regular battles but remained stable, since both sides were living in the Asturian West. Francoist troops advanced from Galicia with the intention of reaching Oviedo. Republican forces were absorbed by the task of containing this attack from the west, and at the same time, tried to defeat Aranda to take Oviedo before the enemy arrived from the west.

They enacted several attempts to recover Oviedo. The strongest attack took place on October 8, 1936, which encircled the town itself: fighting street by street, but they failed to take control of the city. Finally, the Francoists managed to establish a "corridor" through Grado and conquer Oviedo on the 17th. The Republicans tried to cut this "corridor" on several occasions, with 50,000 men, which included their aviation and a large part of their artillery. The struggle through the "Corridor of Grado", stopped and resumed three times, consuming enormous efforts on both sides.

Meanwhile, the Tarna area maintained a "containment" role since there was a balance of forces. The most strategic points were fortified. Even today, concrete structures like the Fort of Alboleya, the Fort of Guaranga, and the two forts that remain in the Port of Tarna exist.

These structures resemble a small part of the military deployment of the time, which was characterized by large areas protected by trenches, observation points, barbed wire, and a “no-man's-land” space between the two armies. Each republican battalion (except casualties and wounded) consisted of 500 men, and in Tarna: 252, 228, and 231 This reality altered daily life and culture in the town. During calm seasons, the soldiers would go down from the port to the town and would be served a liquor nicknamed "parapet jumper" similar to brandy. This also created civil problems due to a large concentration of troops in a small area.

=== The Republican Offensive of May, 1937 ===
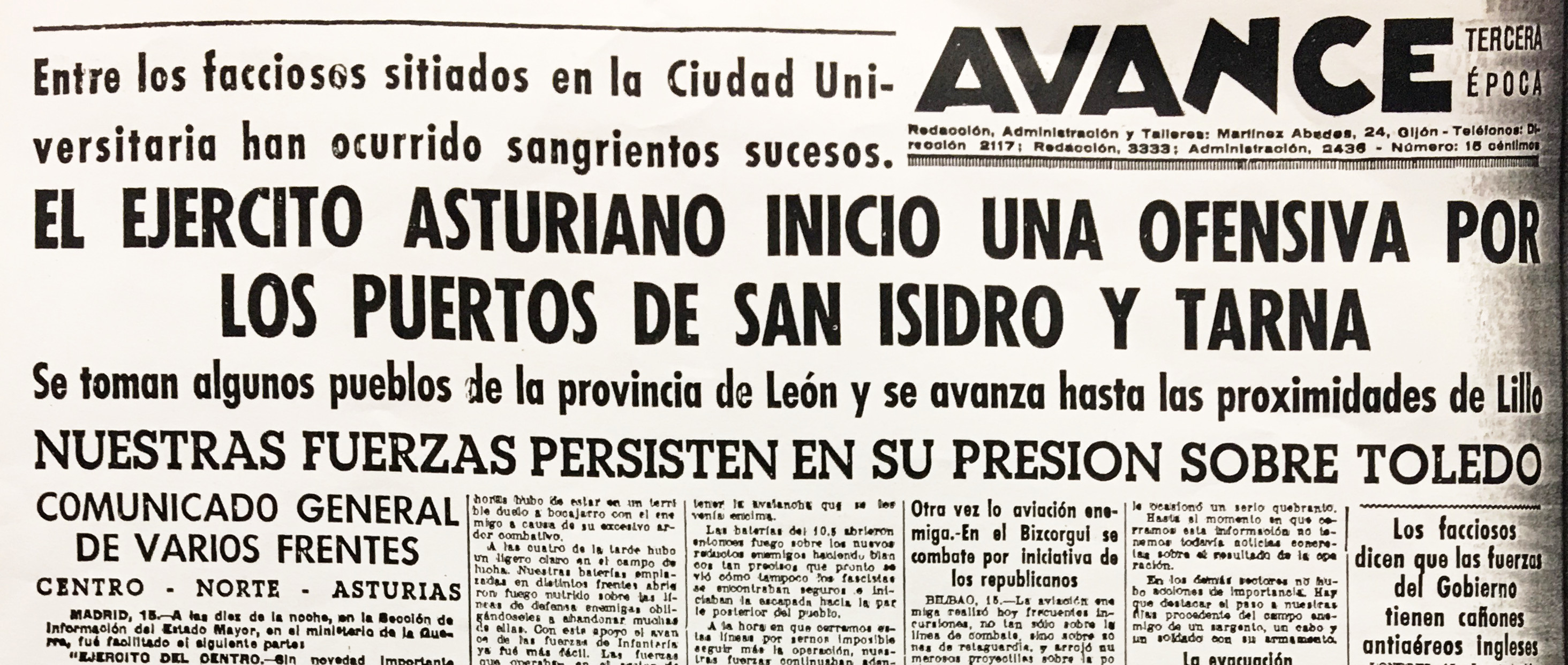
2017-09-29 Titular Diario Avance Mayo 1937

Since the start of 1937, the Francoist army prioritized conquering Madrid. The city proved to be well-armed and fortified, making it impossible at the time. Franco decided to change strategy. He redirected his forces to attack the Cantabrian coast, starting with Euskadi.

Franco's army began to concentrate its force against the Basque Country, the Republican side attempted an offensive from Tarna and Pajares that forced the enemy to divert forces.

Certain factors affected the present war:

- The Trubia Arms Factory remained in Republican power
- Russian weapons are unloaded in Santander
- The area has raw materials, such as steel and coal
- It is not possible to import weapons or ammunition from France to Asturias
- The North Front is isolated and surrounded by land
- The Republican Fleet is in the Mediterranean protecting Soviet shipments and the Cantabrian Sea is almost in the hands of the Francoist navy
- The Francoists are greater in number, with 160,000 men compared to 120,000
- Franco received weapons from Hitler and Mussolini, in greater quantities than their enemy, with 400 artillery against 250, and 60 tanks against 40
- Aviation forces between both sides are strongly skewed, with Franco's own 70 planes, 70 Italian planes and 80 German planes, compared to 70 Republican planes

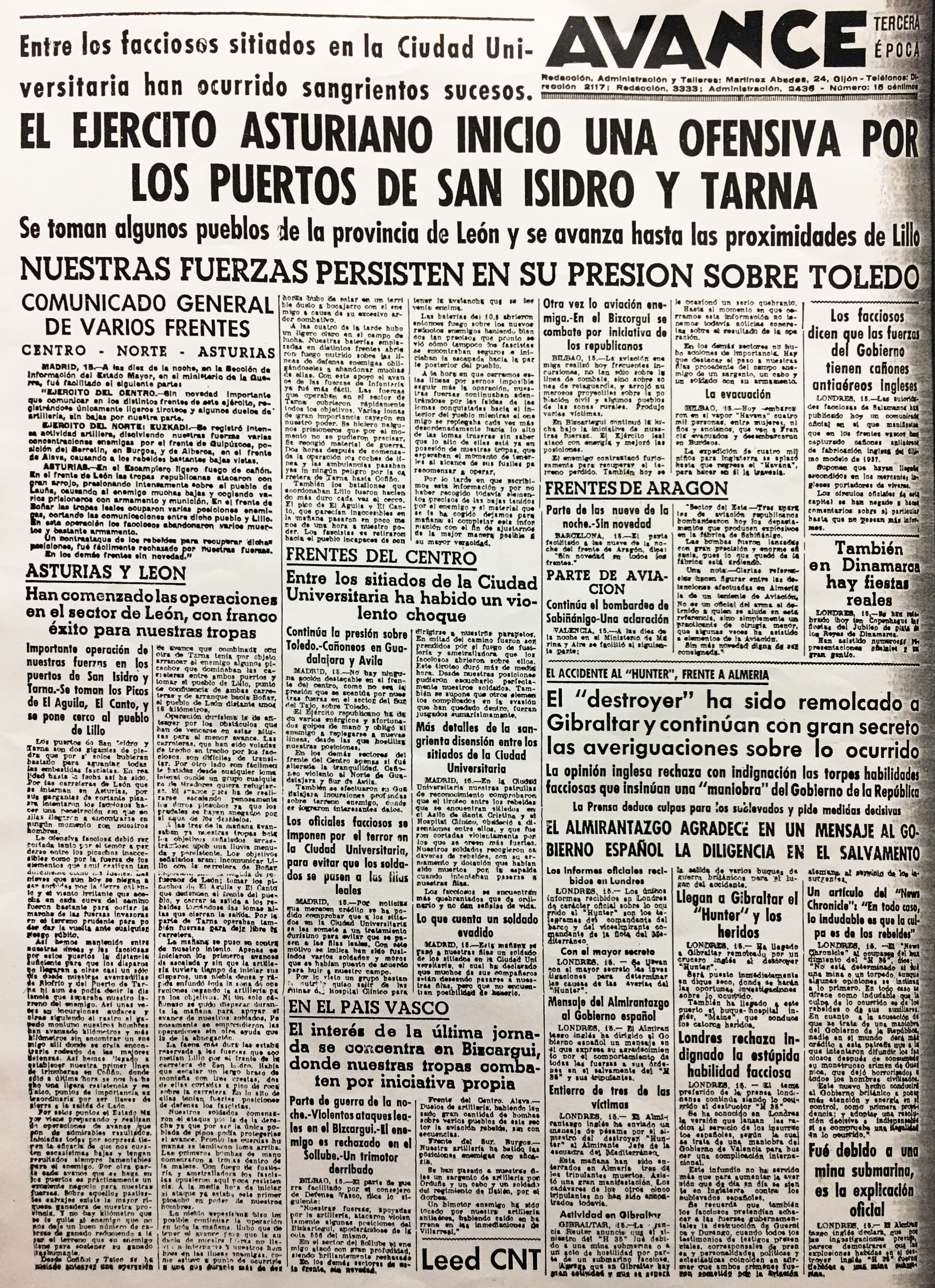
2017-09-29 Diario Avance portada

Despite the odds, the Republican offensive was well-planned and started successfully, breaking the balance of forces that existed in the San Isidro-Tarna area. The Republicans advanced through the Cofiñal valley, conquering the Sierra de Rebollares and the opposite bank. They reached Puebla de Lillo. In response, the Francoist command sent 50 trucks with two tanks of regulars and other infantry, to block the advance.

Immediately, from its base in León, the German Condor Legion, tried to dislodge the Republicans by bombarding their positions, while Franco's artillery did the same from the ground. This combination wore them out for 20 days. According to some sources, on June 9, Franco visited the area to give direct instructions. The Republican army suffered from its lack of supplies, and after almost three weeks of combat, it yielded, retreating to San Isidro-Isoba-Cofiñal-Puerto de Tarna.

Tarna, which housed a headquarters and a field hospital for the Republicans, had a direct relationship with the front. The General Command made a request to collect milk from the neighbors for the field hospital from Villa Lucila. At the time, the mayor of the council sent a letter to Tarna asking the cow owners for cooperation:

On June 19, Bilbao fell. On the Tarna front, the “containment” fighting continued, without the line of fire moving until the end of September.
