= Sobrescobio =

- Municipality
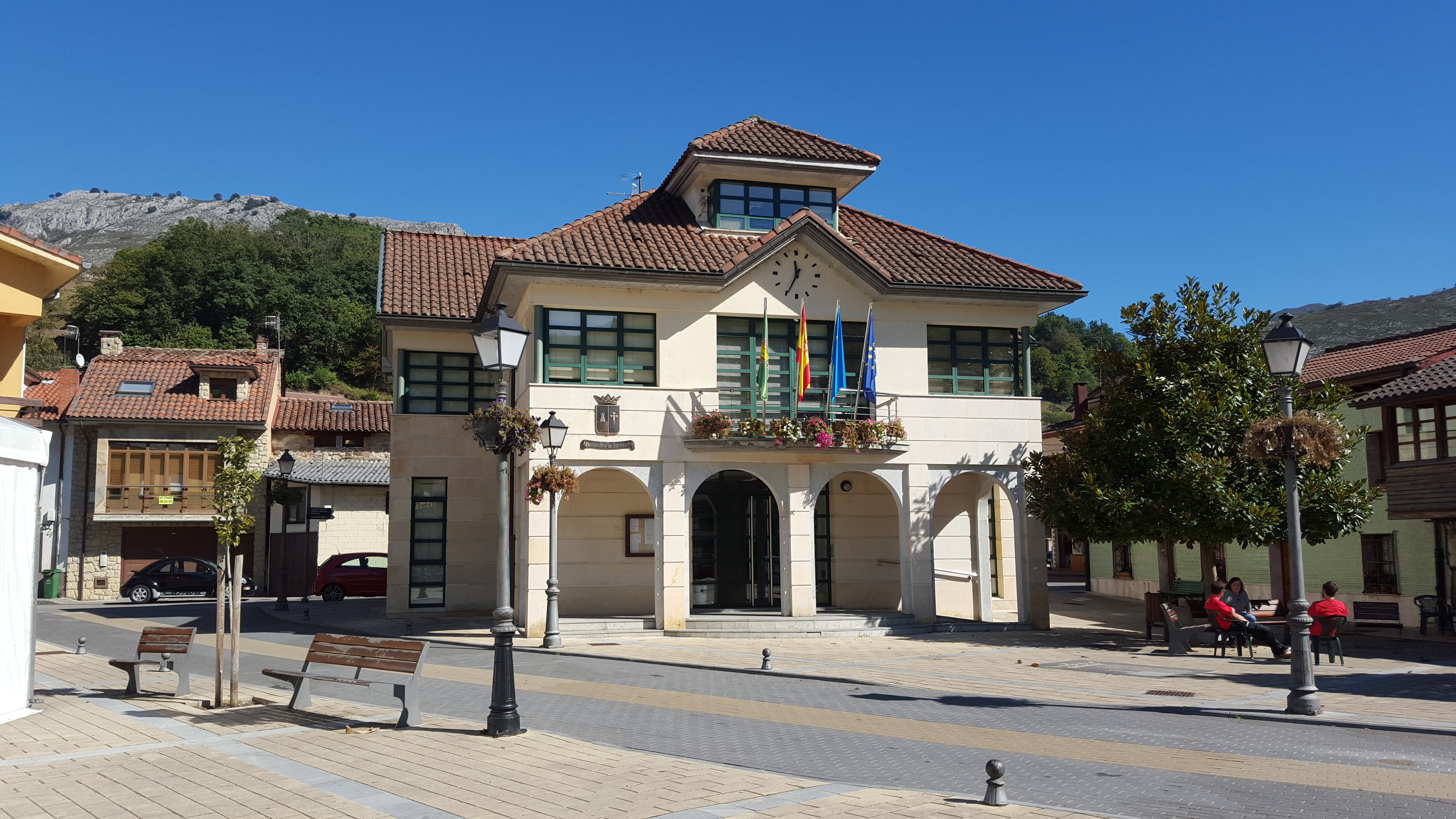
- Town Hall at Rioseco

- Flag Coat of arms

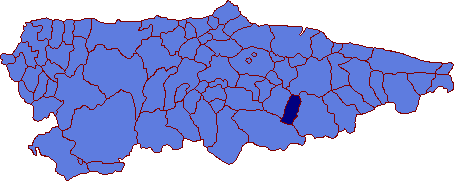

- Location in Spain
- Coordinates: 43°12′N 5°28′W
- Country: Spain
- Autonomous community: Asturias
- Province: Asturias
- Comarca: Nalón
- Capital: Rioseco

Government
  - Alcalde: Marcelino Martínez (PSOE)

Area
  - Total: 69.43 km^{2} (26.81 sq mi)
- Elevation: 381 m (1,250 ft)
- Highest elevation: 1,862 m (6,109 ft)

Population (2025-01-01)
  - Total: 838
  - Density: 12.1/km^{2} (31.3/sq mi)
- Demonym: coyanés
- Time zone: UTC+1 (CET)
  - Summer (DST): UTC+2 (CEST)
- Website: Official website

Sobrescobio (Spanish pronunciation: [soβɾesˈkoβjo]; Asturian: Sobrescobiu, locally [soβɾesˈkuβju]) is a municipality in the Autonomous Community of the Principality of Asturias, Spain. It is bordered on the north by Piloña, on the east by Caso, on the south by Aller, and on the west by Laviana. It is situated in the southeast section of Asturias, at the eastern limit of the Nalón mineral basin.

It forms part of the Communal Valley of Nalón, together with Langreo, San Martín del Rey Aurelio, Laviana and Caso. With Caso, it forms part of the Parque Natural de Redes.

== Geography ==
=== Geology ===
Limestone, slate and occasionally sandstone are the typical rocks in this area. The mountains of the Sierra Grandesllanes, Sierra Carderu, Sierra del Crespón, Sierra Mermeja and Sierra de Collaroces surround the area with El Retriñón, (1.862 m) as highest point.

=== Rivers and lakes ===
Río Nalon passes Sobrescobio. The rivers Rio del Alba, Rio Llaimu, Rio Nozalin and Rio Huegro are located nearby. The reservoir Embalse de Rioseco is in Rioseco, the Capital of Sobrescobio.

=== Climate ===
The climate includes warm summers and mild winters. Strong storms can occur in spring and fall.

== History ==
Human settlement in the area dates to prehistoric times. Some Hill Forts (at Agues (Soto de Agues), Campiellos and Corona de Castro) also Dolmen (at Pumarín, Unqueru, Campu La Braña und Monte Caón) are open to visitors.

The Romans built some bridges along the Rio Nalon.

In the Middle Ages the area was held by the Order of Santiago. In 1528 Philip II sold Sobrescobio for the price of 600,000 Maravedí to the Benedictine Monastery of San Vicente of Oviedo. To this occasion dates the first documented use of the town's name. Later in the 16th century it became an autonomous possession of the Spanish crown.

During the Peninsular War General Jean Pierre François Bonet passed through Sobrescobio on the way to the Battle of Salamanca.

== Economics ==
Agriculture dominated the area until the 19th century. The chestnuts from Sobrescobio where well known in Spain. Falling prices and the industrial expansion in Oviedo and Gijón caused an exodus from Sobrescobio. Regional tourism is expanding, attracting those who appreciate nature and silence.

== Demography ==
From: INE Archiv

== Parishes ==
- Llaíñes
- Oviñana
- Soto

=== Villages ===
==== Llaíñes ====
- Llaíés
- El Castrín
- Castru

==== Oviñana ====
- Campiellos
- La Polina
- Rusecu
- Villamoréi
- Anzó
- Comiyera
- La Molina

==== Soto ====
- Soto
- Agues
- San Andrés

== Main sights ==
- Castle of Villamorey
- "Casa de los Canella" (16th century)
- Parish church of Santa María la Real de Oviñana (15th century)
- Natural Park of Redes

== Notable people ==
- Juan Bautista Gutiérrez (1896–1978), businessman based in Guatemala; he was born in the village of Campiellos.

== See also ==
- List of municipalities in Asturias
