= Redes Natural Park =

Nature park in Spain

- Parque natural de Redes
- IUCN category V (protected landscape/seascape)
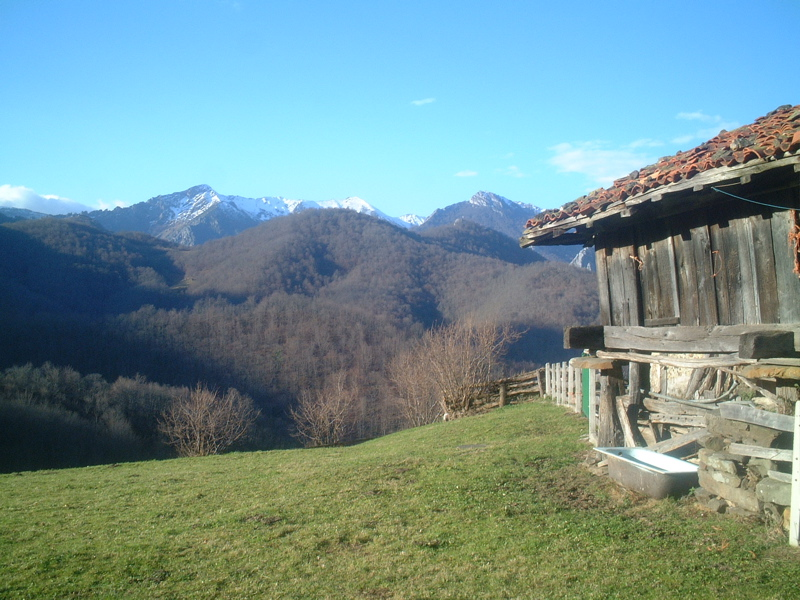
- The structure on right is a type of barn called a hórreo.
- Interactive map of Redes Natural Park
- Location: Spain
- Coordinates: 43.174°N 5.367°W
- Area: 37,803 ha (93,410 acres)
- Established: 1996
- Governing body: Principality of Asturias
- Website: naturalezadeasturias.es/espacios/visita/destinos/PN-redes.html

The Redes Natural Park (Spanish: Parque Natural de Redes) is located in the Principality of Asturias in northern Spain. Its total area is 377.36 km^{2} (145.70 sq mi), split between two municipalities: Caso (307.94 km^{2} (118.90 sq mi)) and Sobrescobio (69.42 km^{2} (26.80 sq mi)). It was declared a natural park in 1996.

== Conservation ==
In September 2001, the park was included by Unesco in the global network of Biosphere reserves. Redes is one a group of biosphere reserves in the Cantabrian Mountains, which includes Picos de Europa National Park and Somiedo Natural Park. Since 2007 there has been discussion of creating a single super-reserve called Gran Cantabrica to protect the mountain eco-system. This integration is expected to benefit animals such as the Cantabrian brown bear which have been adversely affected by habitat fragmentation.

Since 2003 Redes has been protected as a Special Protection Area for birds.

== Tourist attractions ==
There are three natural monuments in the park:

- Ruta del Alba, an old miners' road by the river Alba.
- Deboyu Cave
- El Tabayón del Mongayu (waterfall)

There are various museums in the area including a bee-keeping museum.

== Flora ==
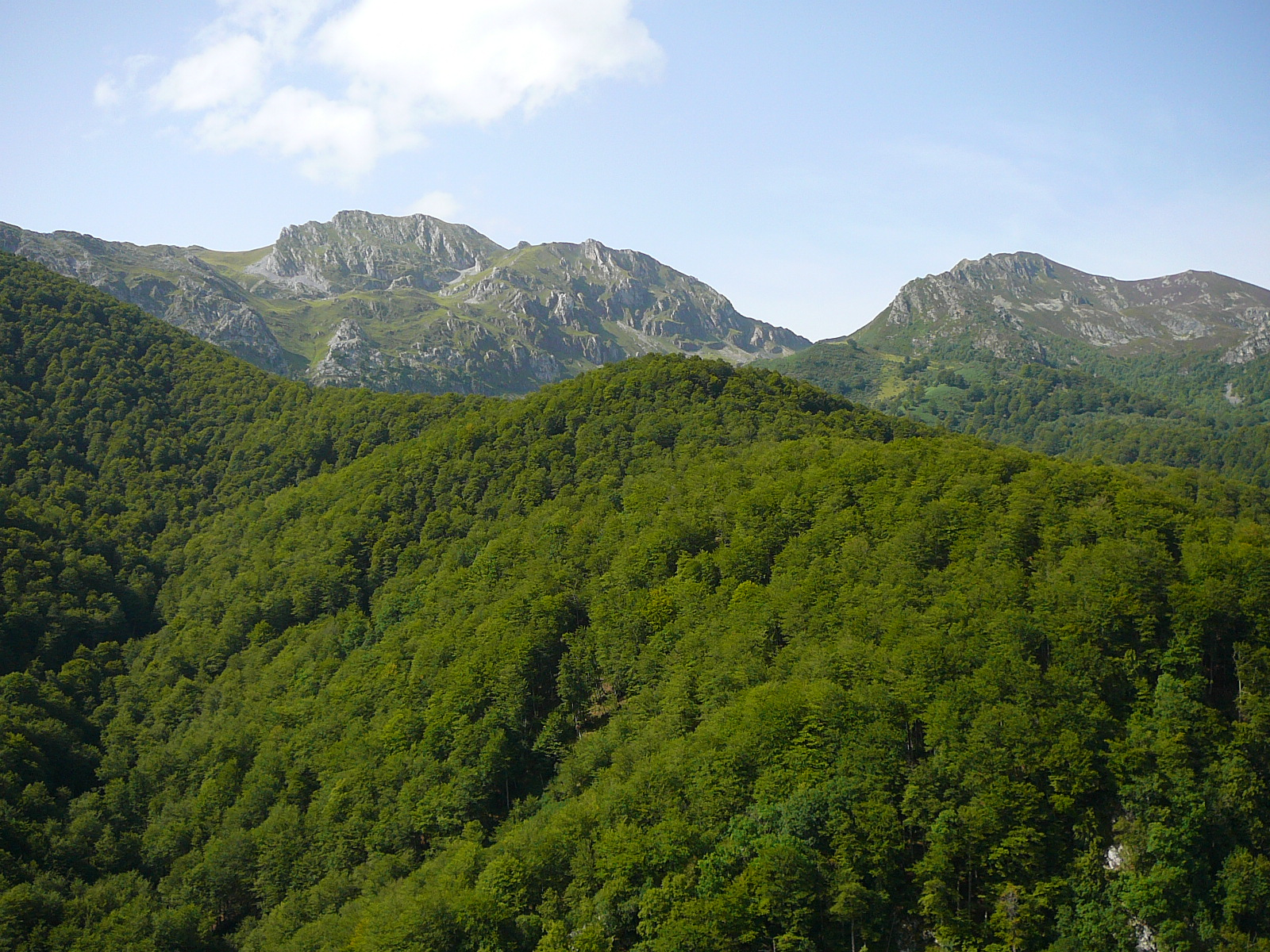
Woods in the park from the Brañagallones trail.

Temperate deciduous woodland is typical of the park.

== Fauna ==
=== Farming ===
The human population carries out traditional livestock farming including transhumance using high pastures called "brañas". The biosphere reserve aims to protect traditional farming as a sustainable use of natural resources.

=== Mammals ===
Cantabrian brown bears are often found in the park, which appears to have a key role in the corridors used by this endangered species. Genetic studies show that the surviving Cantabrian brown bears were divided in the twentieth century into two populations separated by a bear-free zone. (This rupture has been interpreted as the consequence of the development of communication infrastructures and human pressure). However, genetic evidence has been found in Redes of hybridisation, the result of recent breeding between individuals from the two populations. This is good news for the bears as it shows that they have found a way to reverse the fragmentation of their habitat.

There is a breeding population of wolves.

=== Birds ===
Bird-life includes the Cantabrian Capercaillie, a member of the grouse family which is dependent on large tracts of mature woodland. The subspecies has been in decline, partly related to a decline in the quality of its habitat. A recovery plan has been in operation, funded by the LIFE Programme, which is due to end in 2016. The recovery plan operates across 16 SPAs, including Redes. There has been work to improve the birds' habitat and to reintroduce them to areas where it appears they have become extinct. Reintroductions have involved a facility for raising capercaillies in captivity at Sobrescobio.

=== Invertebrates ===
Gastropod species include the Kerry slug.

== See also ==
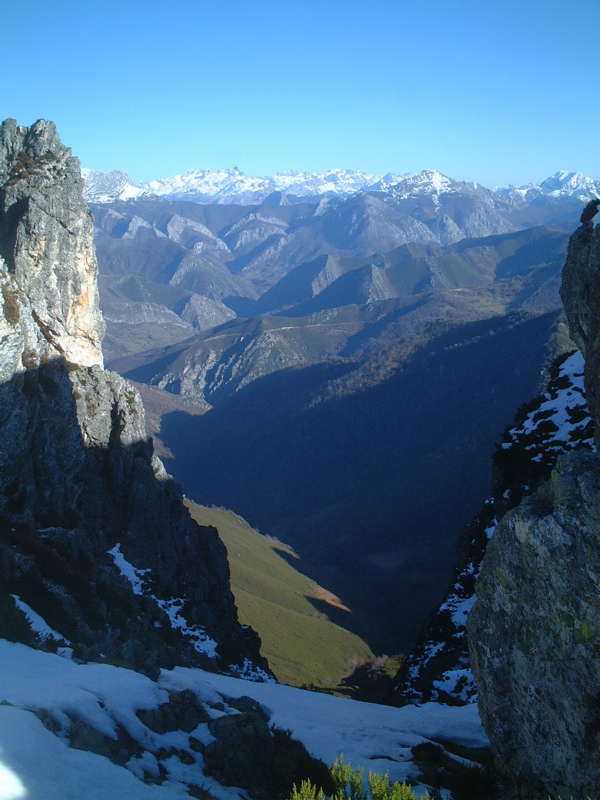
View of the Picos de Europa from Redes

- Ponga, a nearby locality which also has a natural park.
