= Pola de Laviana =

Coordinates: 43°14′42″N 5°33′43″W

La Pola Llaviana/Pola de Laviana
- Parish
- Location within Spain
- Country: Spain
- Autonomous community: Asturias
- Province: Asturias
- Municipality: Laviana

Population (2011)
  - Total: 9,106

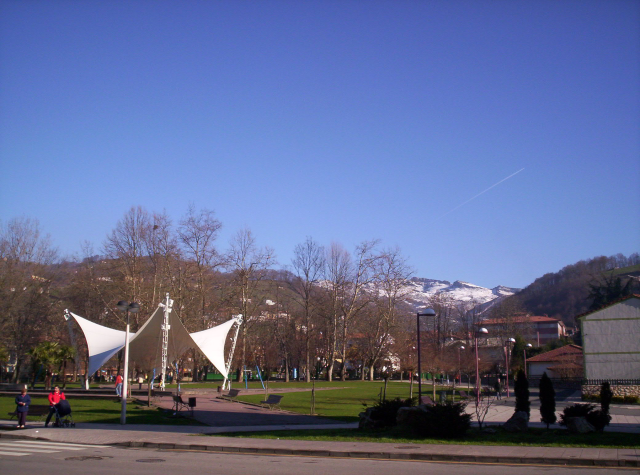
Park in Pola de Laviana

Pola de Laviana (Asturian La Pola Llaviana and officially La Pola Llaviana/Pola de Laviana) is one of nine parishes (administrative divisions) in Laviana, a municipality within the province and autonomous community of Asturias, in northern Spain. This parish is the most populated of Laviana and it is located in Nalon Valley.

Moreover, Pola de Laviana is the capital of the Laviana municipality.

The extension of this parish is 9.8 km^{2} and its population is 9,106 inhabitants (2011).

== The Parish ==
Pola de Laviana is especially known for its gastronomy. It celebrates the annual religious celebrations of the Virgin of the Otero, the celebrations of the neighborhood of the Pontona, the celebrations on the occasion of the Descent Folkloric of the Nalón, declared of Regional Tourist Interest, the festivities of the Xeronda and The Chalana. Pola de Laviana, as capital, has several administrative, educational, sports and cultural services.

== Art ==
- Parish Church of Our Mistress of the Assumption whose style is neo-Gothic historical.
- Church of Our Mistress of Otero. This church is a work after the fifteenth century. It has a Latin cross shape with a bell gable in a cross shape. This church is dedicated to the patron saint of La Pola.
- Chapel of San José. Rebuilt in the historic style of the popular type with ornaments of mountain taste.

Other notable buildings are the Consistorial House, the Ancient Maxi Theater and the traditional buildings of the historical center.

== Villages ==
According to the gazetteer the parish of Pola de Laviana comprises the following villages:

- El Cantu Baxu: 4 residents;
- El Cantu Riba: 9 residents;
- La Carba les Llanes: 5 residents;
- La Carba: 13 residents;
- Casapapiu: 7 residents;
- La Castañal : 7 residents;
- El Castrillón : 11 residents;
- La Chalana: uninhabited;
- El Felguerón : 3 residents;
- L'Horrón de Riba : 7 residents;
- Les Llanes : 13 residents;
- Les Quintanes
- Les Bories
- Llancuervu : uninhabited;
- Lloreo : 15 residents;
- El Llosón: 2 residents;
- El Meruxal : 20 residents;
- L'Umines : uninhabited;
- La Ortigosa : 3 residents;
- L'Otero : 9 residents;
- El Pandu : 1 resident;
- Pielgos : 10 residents;
- La Piniella : 47 residents;
- La Pola Llaviana/Pola de Laviana : 8.887 residents;
- Les Portielles : 4 residents;
- La Quinta Norte : 9 residents;
- La Quinta : 2 residents;
- La Rasa: 1 resident;
- La Robellá : 17 residents;
- El Rebollusu : 2 residents;
- El Robledal : 12 residents;
- La Sartera : 4 residents;
- Solavelea : uninhabited;
- Sospelái : uninhabited;
- La Traviesa : uninhabited;
- Valdelesabeyes de Baxo : 6 residents;
- Valdelesabeyes de Riba : uninhabited;
- El Vallebregón : 1 resident.
- Villoria

== Sports ==
Pola de Laviana has its own soccer team, it's Real Titánico.
