= El Tozu (Piloña) =

Coordinates: 43°16′02″N 5°23′55″W

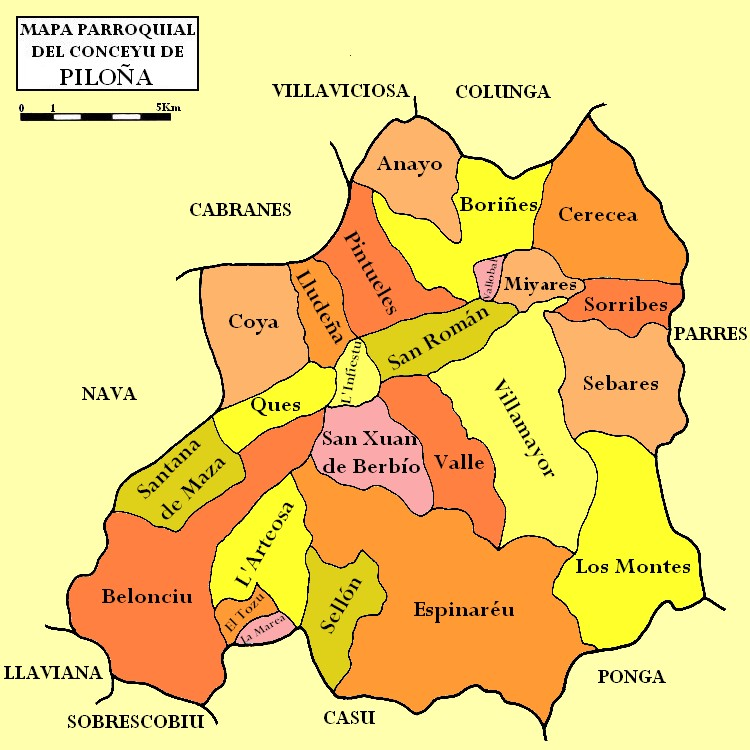
map of parishes in Piloña, with El Tozu at lower left

El Tozu is one of 24 parishes (administrative divisions) in Piloña, a municipality within the province and autonomous community of Asturias, in northern Spain.

The population is 23.
