= El Tozu (Caso) =

- Parish
- Location within Spain
- Coordinates: 43.266°N 5.398°W
- Country: Spain
- Autonomous community: Asturias
- Province: Asturias
- Municipality: Caso

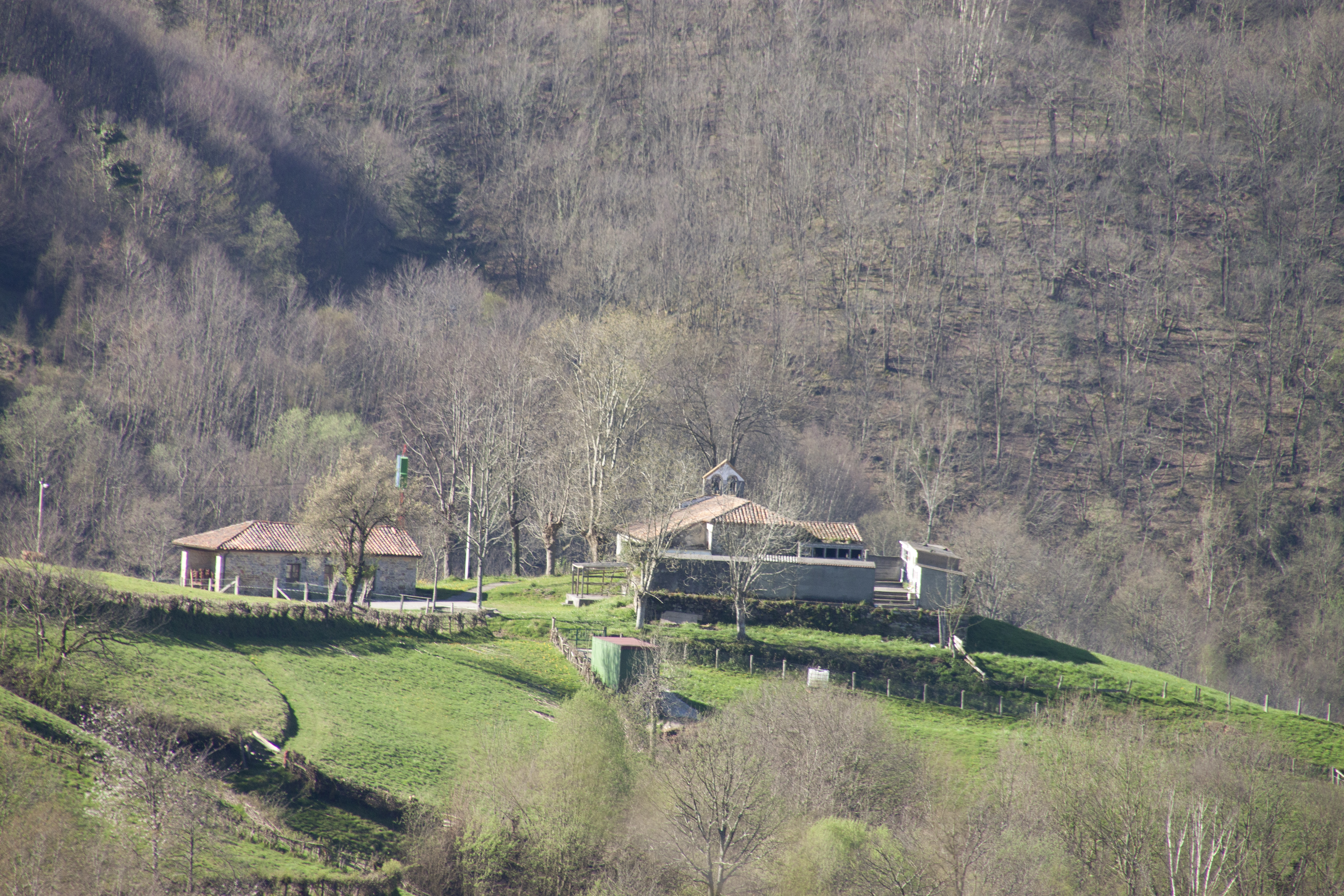
El Tozu (Caso, Asturias)

El Tozu (Spanish: Tozo) is one of ten parishes (administrative divisions) in Caso, a municipality within the province and autonomous community of Asturias, in northern Spain.

The population is 75 (INE 2006).

== Villages ==
- El Tozu
- Cabañaderecha
