= 12th General Junta of the Principality of Asturias =

12th General Junta
←	11th	13th	→
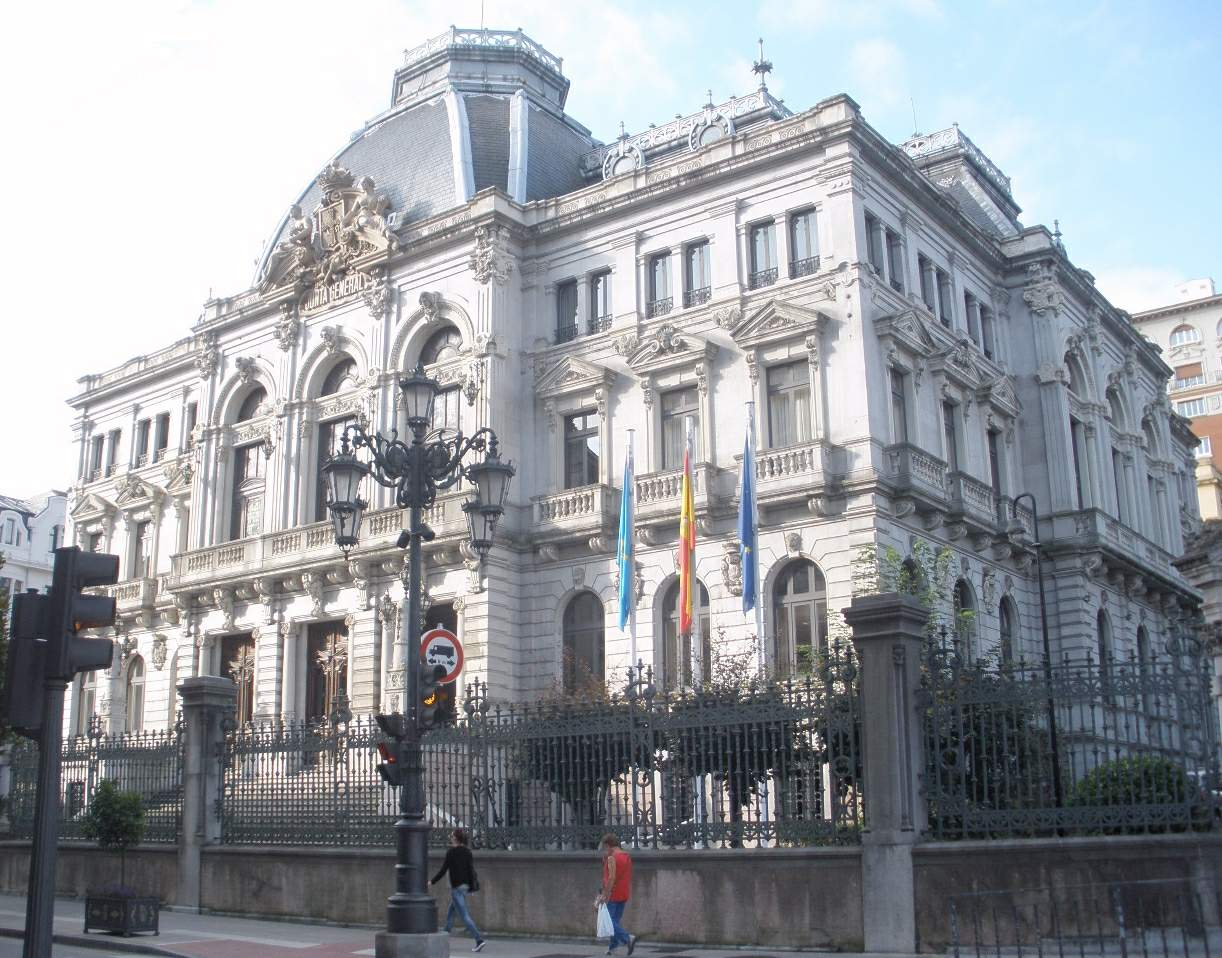

Overview
- Legislative body: General Junta of the Principality of Asturias
- Term: 26 June 2023 –
- Election: 28 May 2023
- Government: Barbón II
- Website: jgpa.es

Deputies
- Members: 45
- President: Juan Cofiño (PSOE)
- First Vice-President: Celia Fernández (PSOE)
- Second Vice-President: José Agustín Cuervas-Mons (PP)
- First Secretary: Delia Campomanes (IU–MP–IAS)
- Second Secretary: María del Pilar Fernández (PP)

The 12th General Junta is the current meeting of the General Junta, the parliament of the Principality of Asturias, with the membership determined by the results of the regional election held on 28 May 2023. The congress met for the first time on 26 June 2023, with a maximum term of four years.

== Election ==
The 12th Asturian regional election was held on 28 May 2023. At the election the Spanish Socialist Workers' Party (PSOE) remained the largest party in the General Junta despite losing one seat, falling short of a majority again. The People's Party of Asturias (PP) gained 7 seats after the collapse of Citizens (CS).

Alliance	Votes	%	Seats	+/–
Spanish Socialist Workers' Party (PSOE)	195,999	36.49%	19	▼1
People's Party (PP)	175,131	32.61%	17	▲7
Vox (Vox)	54,273	10.10%	4	▲2
Assembly for Asturias United Left–More Country–Asturian Left (IU–MP–IAS)	40,774	7.59%	3	▲1
We Can Asturias (Podemos Asturies)	21,052	3.92%	1	▼3
Asturias Forum (Foro)	19,652	3.65%	1	▼1
SOS Asturias–Empty Spain (SOS Asturias)	5,838	1.08 %	0	Steady
Citizens–Party of the Citizenry (CS)	4,974	0.92%	0	▼5
Others/blanks	19,330	3.64%	0	
Total	537,023	100.00%	45	Steady

== History ==
The new parliament met for the first time on 26 June 2023 and Juan Cofiño (PSOE) was elected as President of the General Junta with the support of United Left and Asturian Forum.

President
Candidate		Votes
Juan Cofiño	PSOE	23
José Manuel Felgueres	PP	17
Gonzalo Centeno	Vox	4
Blank		1
Total		45

== Deaths, resignations and suspensions ==
The 12th General Junta has seen the following deaths, resignations and suspensions:

- 9 August 2023 - María Concepción Saavedra (Ind., PSOE) resigned after being appointed Minister of Health in the Asturian regional cabinet. She was replaced by Ricardo Fernández (PSOE) on 14 September 2023.
- 14 September 2023 - Enrique Fernández (PSOE) resigned after being appointed senator by the General Junta. He was replaced by Jacinto Braña (PSOE) on 10 October 2023.
- 13 October 2023 - Diego Canga (PP), leader of the People's Party, announced his resignation and decision on returning to his post as civil servant in Brussels. He was replaced by Pedro de Rueda (PP) on 24 October 2023. Member Álvaro Queipo (PP) was elected to replace him as leader of the People's Party of Asturias on a primary election in early November with 85,34%.
- 2 February 2024 - Pablo González (PP) resigned. He was replaced by Nuria González-Nuevo (PP) on 7 February 2024.
- 27 January 2026 - Cristina Vega (PP) resigned after being named civil servant. She was replaced by Salomé Sánchez (PP) on 30 January 2026.

== Members ==
Name	Constituency	No.	Party	Alliance	Group	Took office	Left office	Notes
Rafael Alonso	Central	12	PPA	PP	People's	26 June 2023		
Alba Álvarez	Western	2	FSA	PSOE	Socialists	26 June 2023		
Sara Concepción Álvarez	Central	3	Vox	Vox	Vox	26 June 2023		
Adrián Barbón	Central	1	FSA	PSOE	Socialists	26 June 2023		
Jacinto Braña	Central	15	FSA	PSOE	Socialists	10 October 2023		Replaces Enrique Fernández
Sandra María Camino	Central	10	PPA	PP	People's	26 June 2023		
Delia Campomanes	Central	2	IU/IX	IU–MP–IAS	IU–MP–IAS	26 June 2023		
Diego Canga	Central	1	PPA	PP	People's	26 June 2023	13 October 2023	Replaced by Pedro de Rueda.
María Dolores Carcedo	Central	4	FSA	PSOE	Socialists	26 June 2023		
Gonzalo Centeno	Central	4	Vox	Vox	Vox	26 June 2023		
Manuel Cifuentes	Central	11	PPA	PP	People's	26 June 2023		
Juan Manuel Cofiño	Central	3	FSA	PSOE	Socialists	26 June 2023		
José Luis Costillas	Central	9	PPA	PP	People's	26 June 2023		
José Agustín Cuervas-Mons	Central	5	PPA	PP	People's	26 June 2023		
José Manuel Felgueres	Eastern	2	PPA	PP	People's	26 June 2023		
Enrique Fernández	Central	7	FSA	PSOE	Socialists	26 June 2023	14 September 2023	Replaced by Jacinto Braña.
Lidia Fernández	Western	3	FSA	PSOE	Socialists	26 June 2023		
Luis Ramón Fernández	Central	9	FSA	PSOE	Socialists	26 June 2023		
María Celia Fernández	Central	6	FSA	PSOE	Socialists	26 June 2023		
María del Pilar Fernández	Central	2	PPA	PP	People's	26 June 2023		
Ricardo Fernández	Central	14	FSA	PSOE	Socialists	14 September 2023		Replaces María Concepción Saavedra.
Susana Fernández	Central	8	PPA	PP	People's	26 June 2023		
María Esther Freile	Eastern	3	FSA	PSOE	Socialists	26 June 2023		
José Ramón García	Central	5	FSA	PSOE	Socialists	26 June 2023		
María Gloria García	Central	6	PPA	PP	People's	26 June 2023		
Ana Isabel González	Central	13	FSA	PSOE	Socialists	26 June 2023		
Pablo González	Central	4	PPA	PP	People's	26 June 2023		
Javier Jové	Central	2	Vox	Vox	Vox	26 June 2023		
Gimena Llamedo	Eastern	1	FSA	PSOE	Socialists	26 June 2023		
Carolina López	Central	1	Vox	Vox	Vox	26 June 2023		
Noelia Macías	Central	12	FSA	PSOE	Socialists	26 June 2023		
Marcelino Marcos	Western	1	FSA	PSOE	Socialists	26 June 2023		
Salvador Menéndez	Western	3	PPA	PP	People's	26 June 2023		
Ángel Ricardo Morales	Eastern	2	FSA	PSOE	Socialists	26 June 2023		
Beatriz Polledo	Central	3	PPA	PP	People's	26 June 2023		
Ana Isabel Puerto	Central	10	FSA	PSOE	Socialists	26 June 2023		
Adrián Pumares	Central	1	Foro	Foro	Mixed	26 June 2023		
Álvaro Queipo	Western	1	PPA	PP	People's	26 June 2023		
Mónica Ronderos	Central	8	FSA	PSOE	Socialists	26 June 2023		
Andrés David Ruiz	Central	7	PPA	PP	People's	26 June 2023		
Pedro de Rueda	Central	13	PPA	PP	People's	24 October 2023		Replaced Diego Canga.
María Concepción Saavedra	Central	2	Independent	PSOE	Socialists	26 June 2023	9 August 2023	Replaced by Ricardo Fernández.
René Suárez	Central	11	FSA	PSOE	Socialists	26 June 2023		
Covadonga Tomé	Central	1	Podemos	Podemos	Mixed	26 June 2023		
Cristina Vega	Western	2	PPA	PP	People's	26 June 2023		
Xabel Vegas	Central	3	SMR	IU–MP–IAS	IU–MP–IAS	26 June 2023		
Luis Miguel Venta	Eastern	1	PPA	PP	People's	26 June 2023		
Ovidio Zapico	Central	1	IU/IX	IU–MP–IAS	IU–MP–IAS	26 June 2023		
