= 2027 Asturian regional election =

Election in the Spanish region of Asturias

- 23 May 2027

All 45 seats in the General Junta of the Principality of Asturias 23 seats needed for a majority
- Opinion polls
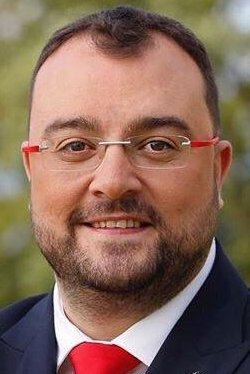

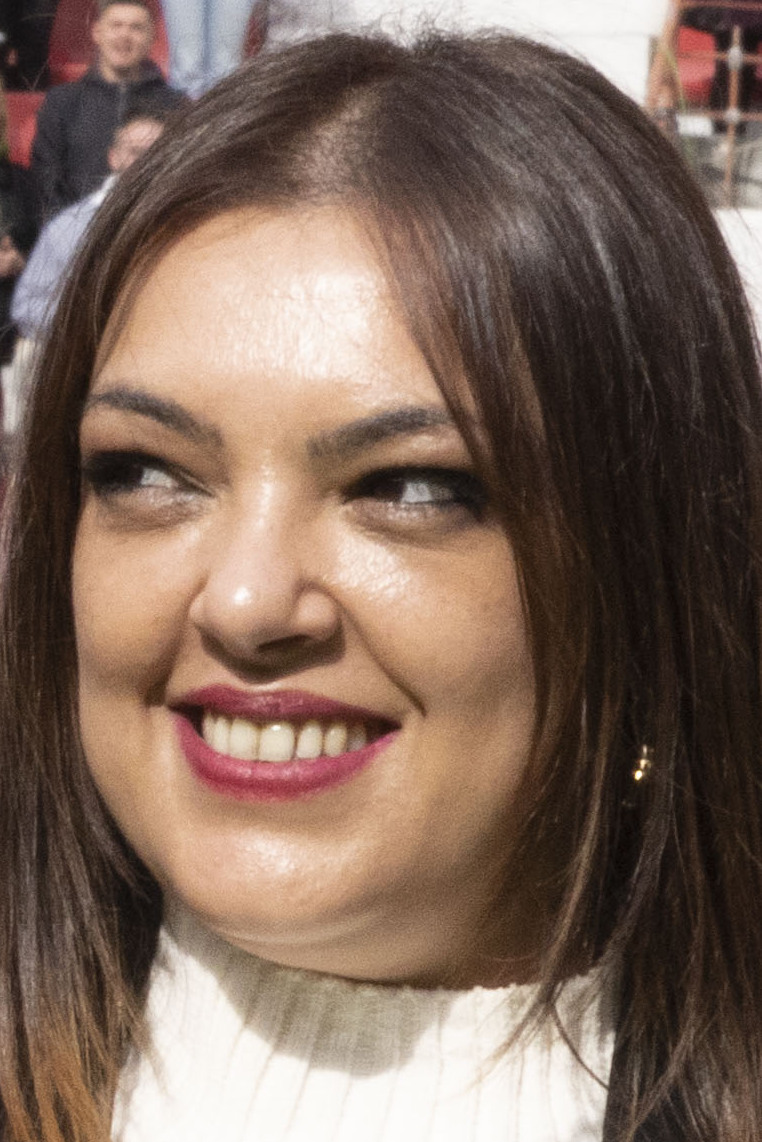

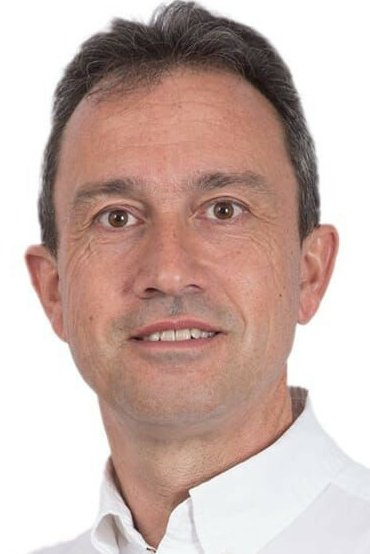

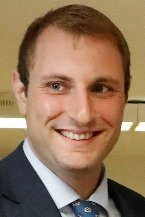

| Leader | Adrián Barbón | Álvaro Queipo | Carolina López |
| Party | PSOE | PP | Vox |
| Leader since | 17 September 2017 | 18 November 2023 | 19 January 2023 |
| Leader's seat | Central | Western | Central |
| Last election | 19 seats, 36.5% | 17 seats, 32.6% | 4 seats, 10.1% |
| Current seats | 19 | 17 | 4 |
| Seats needed | ▲4 | ▲6 | ▲19 |
| Leader | Ovidio Zapico | Adrián Pumares | TBD |
| Party | IU–MP–IAS | Foro | Podemos Asturias |
| Leader since | 5 April 2023 | 1 October 2022 | — |
| Leader's seat | Central | Central | — |
| Last election | 3 seats, 7.6% | 1 seat, 3.7% | 1 seat, 3.9% |
| Current seats | 3 | 1 | 0 |
| Seats needed | ▲20 | ▲22 | ▲23 |
Incumbent President
Adrián Barbón
PSOE

A regional election will be held in Asturias on 23 May 2027 to elect the 13th General Junta of the autonomous community. All 45 seats in the General Junta will be up for election. It will be held concurrently with regional elections in at least six other autonomous communities and local elections all across Spain.

== Overview ==
Under the 1981 Statute of Autonomy, the General Junta of the Principality of Asturias is the unicameral legislature of the homonymous autonomous community, having legislative power in devolved matters, as well as the ability to grant or withdraw confidence from a regional president. The electoral and procedural rules are supplemented by national law provisions.

=== Date ===
The term of the General Junta of the Principality of Asturias expires four years after the date of its previous election, with election day being fixed for the fourth Sunday of May every four years. The election decree shall be issued no later than 54 days before the scheduled election date and published on the following day in the Official Gazette of the Principality of Asturias (BOPA). The previous election was held on 28 May 2023, setting the date for election day on the fourth Sunday of May four years later, which is 23 May 2027.

The regional president has the prerogative to dissolve the General Junta of the Principality of Asturias at any given time and call a snap election, provided that no motion of no confidence is in process, no nationwide election is due and some time requirements are met: namely, that dissolution does not occur either during the first legislative session or during the last year of parliament before its planned expiration, nor before one year after a previous one. In the event of an investiture process failing to elect a regional president within a two-month period from the first ballot, the General Junta shall be automatically dissolved and a fresh election called. Any snap election held as a result of these circumstances does not alter the date of the chamber's next ordinary election, with elected lawmakers serving the remainder of its original four-year term.

=== Electoral system ===
Voting for the General Junta is based on universal suffrage, comprising all Spanish nationals over 18 years of age, registered in Asturias and with full political rights, provided that they have not been deprived of the right to vote by a final sentence.

The General Junta has a minimum of 35 and a maximum of 45 seats, with electoral provisions fixing its size at the latter number. All are elected in three multi-member constituencies—corresponding to sub-provincial divisions, each of which is assigned an initial minimum of two seats and the remaining 39 distributed in proportion to population—using the D'Hondt method and closed-list proportional voting, with a three percent-threshold of valid votes (including blank ballots) in each constituency. The use of this electoral method may result in a higher effective threshold depending on district magnitude and vote distribution.

As a result of the aforementioned allocation, each General Junta constituency (comprising the municipalities indicated below) would be entitled the following seats:

| Seats | Constituencies | Municipalities |
|---|---|---|
| 34 | Central | Aller, Avilés, Bimenes, Carreño, Caso, Castrillón, Corvera de Asturias, Gijón, Gozón, Illas, Las Regueras, Langreo, Laviana, Lena, Llanera, Mieres, Morcín, Noreña, Oviedo, Proaza, Quirós, Ribera de Arriba, Riosa, San Martín del Rey Aurelio, Santo Adriano, Sariego, Siero, Sobrescobio, Soto del Barco |
| 6 | Western | Allande, Belmonte de Miranda, Boal, Candamo, Cangas del Narcea, Castropol, Coaña, Cudillero, Degaña, El Franco, Grado, Grandas de Salime, Ibias, Illano, Muros de Nalón, Navia, Pesoz, Pravia, Salas, San Martín de Oscos, Santa Eulalia de Oscos, San Tirso de Abres, Somiedo, Tapia de Casariego, Taramundi, Teverga, Tineo, Valdés, Vegadeo, Villanueva de Oscos, Villayón, Yernes y Tameza |
| 5 | Eastern | Amieva, Cabrales, Cabranes, Cangas de Onís, Caravia, Colunga, Llanes, Nava, Onís, Parres, Peñamellera Alta, Peñamellera Baja, Piloña, Ponga, Ribadedeva, Ribadesella, Villaviciosa |

The law does not provide for by-elections to fill vacant seats; instead, any vacancies arising after the proclamation of candidates and during the legislative term will be filled by the next candidates on the party lists or, when required, by designated substitutes.

=== Current parliament ===
The table below shows the composition of the parliamentary groups in the chamber at the present time.

Current parliamentary composition
| Groups | Parties | Legislators | |
| Groups | Parties | Seats | Total |
|---|---|---|---|
| Socialist Parliamentary Group | PSOE | 19 | 19 |
| People's Parliamentary Group | PP | 17 | 17 |
| Vox Parliamentary Group | Vox | 4 | 4 |
| Assembly for Asturias Parliamentary Group | IU/IX | 2 | 3 |
| Assembly for Asturias Parliamentary Group | MS | 1 | 3 |
| Mixed Parliamentary Group | Foro | 1 | 2 |
| Mixed Parliamentary Group | SA | 1 (Note: Covadonga Tomé, former Podemos legislator.) | 2 |

== Parties and candidates ==
The electoral law allows for parties and federations registered in the interior ministry, alliances and groupings of electors to present lists of candidates. Parties and federations intending to form an alliance are required to inform the relevant electoral commission within 10 days of the election call, whereas groupings of electors need to secure the signature of at least one percent of the electorate in the constituencies for which they seek election, disallowing electors from signing for more than one list. Amendments in 2024 required a balanced composition of men and women in the electoral lists through the use of a zipper system.

Below is a list of the main parties and alliances which will likely contest the election:

| Candidacy | Parties and alliances | Leading candidate | Ideology | Previous result | | Gov. | Ref. |
| Candidacy | Parties and alliances | Leading candidate | Ideology | Vote % | Seats | Gov. | Ref. |
|---|---|---|---|---|---|---|---|
| PSOE | List: Spanish Socialist Workers' Party (PSOE) | Adrián Barbón | Social democracy | 36.5% | 19 | Yes | |
| PP | List: People's Party (PP) | Álvaro Queipo | Conservatism; Christian democracy | 32.6% | 17 | No | |
| Vox | List: Vox (Vox) | Carolina López | Right-wing populism Ultranationalism; National conservatism | 10.1% | 4 | No | |
| IU–MP–IAS | List: United Left of Asturias (IU/IX) – Communist Party of Asturias (PCA) – The Dawn Marxist Organization (La Aurora (OM)) – Republican Left (IR); More Country (Más País); Asturian Left (IAS) | Ovidio Zapico | Socialism; Communism | 7.6% | 3 | Yes | |
| Podemos; Asturies | List: We Can Asturias (Podemos Asturies) | TBD | Left-wing populism Direct democracy Democratic socialism | 3.9% | 1 | No | |
| Foro | List: Asturias Forum (Foro) | Adrián Pumares | Regionalism; Conservatism | 3.7% | 1 | No | |

== Opinion polls ==
The tables below list opinion polling results in reverse chronological order, showing the most recent first and using the dates when the survey fieldwork was done, as opposed to the date of publication. Where the fieldwork dates are unknown, the date of publication is given instead. The highest percentage figure in each polling survey is displayed with its background shaded in the leading party's colour. If a tie ensues, this is applied to the figures with the highest percentages. The "Lead" column on the right shows the percentage-point difference between the parties with the highest percentages in a poll.

=== Voting intention estimates ===
The table below lists weighted voting intention estimates. Refusals are generally excluded from the party vote percentages, while question wording and the treatment of "don't know" responses and those not intending to vote may vary between polling organisations. When available, seat projections determined by the polling organisations are displayed below (or in place of) the percentages in a smaller font; 23 seats are required for an absolute majority in the General Junta of the Principality of Asturias.

| Polling firm/Commissioner | Fieldwork date | Sample size | Turnout | PSOE | PP | Vox | CxAst | Podemos | Foro | SOS | CS | Sumar | SALF | Lead |
|---|---|---|---|---|---|---|---|---|---|---|---|---|---|---|
| Sigma Dos/El Mundo | 26 Aug–3 Sep 2026 | 1,129 | ? | 32.4; 15/17 | 32.0; 16/17 | 17.9; 7/9 | 7.6; 3 | 3.0; 0/1 | 1.5; 0 | – | – | – | – | 0.4 |
| EM-Analytics/Electomanía | 1–28 Jun 2026 | 1,270 | ? | 33.5; 17 | 34.4; 19 | 13.6; 5 | (Note: Within Sumar.) | 2.5; 0 | 1.4; 0 | – | 0.2; 0 | 10.8; 4 | – | 0.9 |
| Sigma Dos/El Mundo | 18–21 May 2026 | 1,077 | ? | 34.0; 18 | 32.4; 17/18 | 13.7; 6/7 | 8.5; 3 | 2.6; 0 | 2.4; 0 | – | – | – | – | 1.6 |
| NC Report/La Razón | 16–31 May 2025 | 350 | ? | ? 18 | ? 19 | ? 4 | ? 3 | ? 1 | – | – | – | – | – | ? |
| Sigma Dos/El Mundo | 5–19 May 2025 | 1,003 | ? | 36.6; 18/20 | 33.8; 17/19 | 9.8; 3/4 | 8.3; 3 | 4.6; 1/2 | 3.6; 1 | – | – | – | – | 2.8 |
| Celeste-Tel/PP | 5–17 Feb 2025 | 1,000 | ? | 34.9; 18 | 35.0; 19 | 12.2; 4 | 8.0; 3 | 3.4; 1 | 2.9; 0 | – | – | – | – | 0.1 |
| Celeste-Tel/PP | 25 Sep–23 Oct 2024 | 1,000 | ? | 35.9; 18 | 35.8; 19 | 10.8; 4 | 8.6; 3 | 3.0; 1 | 2.4; 0 | – | – | – | – | 0.1 |
| EM-Analytics/Electomanía | 29 Jul–28 Aug 2024 | 1,270 | ? | 35.2; 18 | 36.2; 20 | 8.9; 3 | | 2.6; 0 | 3.4; 0 | 0.4; 0 | 0.8; 0 | 10.3; 4 | – | 1.0 |
| 2024 EP election | 9 Jun 2024 | —N/a | 44.7 | 35.0 | 36.9 | 10.0 | | 3.8 | – | – | 0.7 | 5.9 | 3.3 | 1.9 |
| GAD3/PP | 13–21 Mar 2024 | 1,000 | ? | 36.1; 18/20 | 37.4; 18/20 | 8.8; 3 | 7.8; 3 | 3.4; 1 | 2.3; 0 | – | – | – | – | 1.3 |
| Celeste-Tel/PP | 26 Jan–8 Feb 2024 | 1,270 | ? | 36.2; 18 | 34.8; 19 | 9.9; 4 | 7.4; 3 | 3.0; 1 | 3.2; 0 | – | – | – | – | 1.4 |
| EM-Analytics/Electomanía | 26 Sep–29 Oct 2023 | 1,270 | ? | 37.4; 20 | 32.2; 17 | 9.6; 3 | 8.3; 3 | 3.6; 1 | 3.6; 1 | 0.8; 0 | 1.0; 0 | – | – | 5.2 |
| 2023 general election | 23 Jul 2023 | —N/a | 62.9 | 34.3 | 35.6 | 12.5 | | | – | 0.4 | – | 14.8 | – | 1.3 |
| 2023 regional election | 28 May 2023 | —N/a | 56.8 | 36.5; 19 | 32.6; 17 | 10.1; 4 | 7.6; 3 | 3.9; 1 | 3.7; 1 | 1.1; 0 | 0.9; 0 | – | – | 3.9 |

=== Voting preferences ===
The table below lists raw, unweighted voting preferences.

| Polling firm/Commissioner | Fieldwork date | Sample size | PSOE | PP | Vox | CxAst | Podemos | Foro | Sumar | SALF | Question | X mark | Lead |
|---|---|---|---|---|---|---|---|---|---|---|---|---|---|
| CIS | 7–31 Mar 2025 | 433 | 34.7 | 22.7 | 6.7 | 4.9 | 1.9 | 0.8 | 3.4 | 0.2 | 16.2 | 4.3 | 12.0 |
| 2024 EP election (Note: Does not include non-resident citizens.) | 9 Jun 2024 | —N/a | 17.7 | 18.7 | 5.0 | | 1.9 | – | 3.0 | 1.7 | —N/a | 49.1 | 1.0 |
| 2023 general election | 23 Jul 2023 | —N/a | 24.2 | 25.1 | 8.8 | | | – | 10.5 | – | —N/a | 28.9 | 0.9 |
| 2023 regional election | 28 May 2023 | —N/a | 23.2 | 20.7 | 6.4 | 4.8 | 2.5 | 2.3 | – | – | —N/a | 35.6 | 3.9 |

=== Preferred President ===
The table below lists opinion polling on leader preferences to become president of the Principality of Asturias.

| Polling firm/Commissioner | Fieldwork date | Sample size | | | | | Other/ None/ Not care | Question | Lead |
| Polling firm/Commissioner | Fieldwork date | Sample size | Barbón PSOE | Queipo PP | López Vox | Zapico IU | Other/ None/ Not care | Question | Lead |
|---|---|---|---|---|---|---|---|---|---|
| CIS (Note: Responses denoting a party's generic candidate are aggregated to that party's main candidate/leader at the time of the poll.) | 7–31 Mar 2025 | 433 | 33.7 | 14.0 | 4.4 | 1.3 | 5.4 | 41.2 | 19.7 |

== Bibliography ==
- Ley Orgánica 5/1985, de 19 de junio, del Régimen Electoral General (Organic Law 5/1985). Official State Gazette (in Spanish). 19 June 1985 [version as of 2 July 2026]. BOE-A-1985-11672.
- Ley Orgánica 7/1981, de 30 de diciembre, de Estatuto de Autonomía para Asturias (Organic Law 7/1981). Official State Gazette (in Spanish). 30 December 1981 [version as of 17 July 2010]. BOE-A-1982-634.
- Ley 6/1984, de 5 de julio, del Presidente y del Consejo de Gobierno del Principado de Asturias (Law 6/1984). Official State Gazette (in Spanish). 5 July 1984 [version as of 24 September 2018]. BOE-A-1984-19762.
- Ley 14/1986, de 26 de diciembre, sobre régimen de elecciones a la Junta General del Principado de Asturias (Law 14/1986). Official State Gazette (in Spanish). 26 December 1986 [version as of 27 March 1991]. BOE-A-1987-3910.
