= Covadonga Tomé =

Spanish doctor and politician (born 1970)

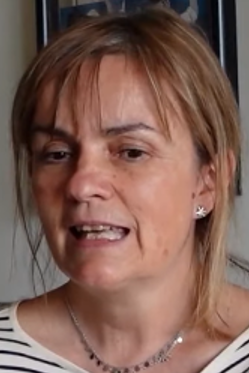
Tomé in 2023

Covadonga Tomé Nestal (born 30 August 1970) is a Spanish pediatrician and politician. She was elected to the General Junta of the Principality of Asturias as Podemos's only deputy in 2023, and continued to sit as an independent following her expulsion from the party in the same year.

== Early and personal life ==
Tomé was born in Luarca in Asturias. Her father, who was from Santiago de Compostela in Galicia, was a doctor specialised in internal medicine. He died from tobacco-induced lung disease aged 46, when she was 12. Tomé said in 2023 that her father had influenced her profession and her political views. Her mother was born in Mieres in Asturias, raised in Galicia, and worked as a pediatrician in Luarca until the age of 70.

A middle child with two brothers, Tomé studied medicine from 1988 to 1994, becoming a pediatrician specialised in digestive issues. She practiced medicine in Ourense and Barcelona before returning to her region of birth.

Tomé married Luis Menéndez in 1999, having met when he was studying a business course. They have one son and one daughter. When asked in 2023 how that Podemos's economic positions could be reconciled with her husband's business profession, Tomé said that her husband was not a supporter of the party, nor was she interested how he would vote at all.

== Political career ==
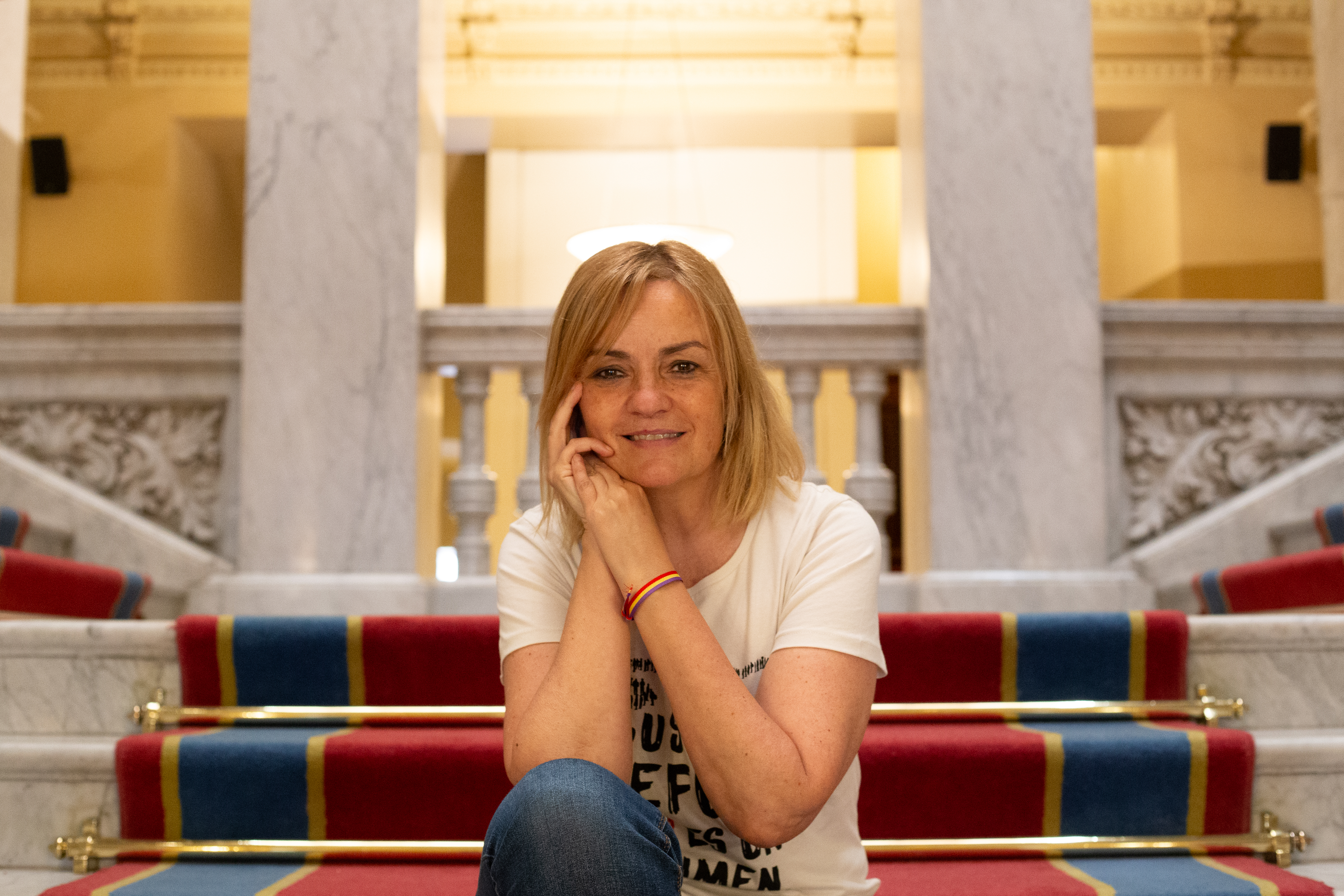
Tomé inside the building of the General Junta of the Principality of Asturias

Tomé ran against incumbent Podemos Asturias secretary Alba González to be the party's lead candidate in the 2023 Asturian regional election. She won by 1,565 votes to 1,150. Podemos's election campaign was beset with disputes between Tomé and the party's new regional secretary general Sofía Castañón, over the expulsion of Castañón's predecessor Daniel Ripa. Tomé also had disputes with the party's national leadership, whom she accused of not funding the campaign at all. Podemos fell from four deputies in the General Junta of the Principality of Asturias to just Tomé, who was elected by the Central constituency.

On 19 July 2023, Tomé gave her support for Adrián Barbón to have a second term as President of Asturias. Her vote was essential for the second government of Adrián Barbón to have a majority, as his Spanish Socialist Workers' Party (PSOE) had 19 of 45 seats, and three votes of approval were given by the deputies of the Convocatoria por Asturias. Tomé had called an online consultation of Podemos members, and agreed to support Barbón as 70% of the 205 consulted had said so; the executive of Podemos in Asturias had already decide to support Barbón and said that Tomé's measures were not binding. Tomé said that her motivation to vote in Barbón's government was to avoid a People's Party government, and to avoid Podemos being accused of right-wing sympathies.

In December 2023, Tomé was expelled from Podemos, who alleged that she was criticising its decisions, breaking its statutes and not making donations. She had been suspended for the previous two months, during which she said she would not resign her seat.

Tomé's expulsion was made final in March 2024. The following month, she said that she and her also expelled allies were in the process of making a new party for the next Asturian regional election, scheduled for 2027. She said that she did not rule out joining Sumar, but said that group was losing ground to the United Left and its allies in Asturias.
