= Alba González =

Spanish writer and politician

Member of the Gijón City Council
- In office 15 June 2019 – 15 January 2020

Personal details
- Born: Alba González Sanz; 18 January 1986 (age 40) Oviedo, Spain
- Party: Podemos Asturias
- Education: University of Oviedo
- Occupation: Writer, politician

Alba González Sanz (born 18 January 1986) is a Spanish writer and politician of the party Podemos Asturias.

== Biography ==
Born in Oviedo in 1986, Alba González grew up and lived in Posada de Llanera until 2013, when she moved to Gijón. She has spent periods of study in Madrid and the United States.

She earned a licentiate in 2009 in Hispanic philology from the University of Oviedo. She added a master's degree in gender equality in human, legal, and social sciences from the Spanish National Research Council (CSIC) in 2010, and one in gender and diversity from the University of Oviedo in 2011.

From 2006 to 2012, together with Héctor Gómez Navarro and Laura Casielles, she was coordinator of the Hesperya Cultural Association. This included publication of a magazine of the same name and the editing of two poetry collections on paper and one in electronic format. The association also promoted La Ciudad en Llamas (The City on Fire), a national meeting of young poets.

In 2012, González and plastic artist Job Sánchez curated the exhibition Estrada-Cuadernos de viaje.

In 2014, she appeared in Se dice poeta, a feminist documentary about contemporary Spanish poetry with a gender perspective, directed by writer and audiovisual producer Sofía Castañón.

Since 2006, she has written reviews, reports, and conducted interviews for various print and online media, including La tormenta en un vaso, Quimera, El Cuaderno, and the feminist portal La tribu de Frida.

Her areas of interest are related to Spanish literature of the 19th and 20th centuries written by women, as well as the study of the insertion of women into the culture of Spanish modernity, women's writing, and political demands.

== Political career ==
In the municipal elections of May 2019, González was elected to a seat on the Gijón City Council for the 2019–2023 plenary sessions. On 15 January 2020, she resigned as councilor upon being appointed Director-General for Equality of Treatment and Ethnnoracial Diversity for the national Ministry of Equality. However, her appointment received criticism, and she was replaced by Rita Bosaho before taking office. From January 2020 to February 2022, González was an advisor at the Ministry of Equality, with Irene Montero as minister.

In 2021, Sofia Castañón won a tight election over Daniel Ripa to become general secretary of Podemos Asturias, and González was appointed organizational secretary of its new board of directors.

In the 2023 Asturian regional election, González ran in the primary against Covadonga Tomé, allied with the former Ripa board. She represented the sector linked to the Podemos Asturies board. She lost in the election of 4 November 2022. The following January, she resigned as organization secretary of Podemos Asturies, criticizing pressure received from the sector linked to Tomé and Ripa. She also cited health problems.

== Awards and recognition ==
- 2008 – Arquímedes Award for University Research for her analysis of tragic structure in the work of Ricardo Menéndez Salmón
- 2010 – Gloria Fuertes Award for Youth Poetry for her book Apuntes de espera

== Works ==
=== Poetry collections ===
- Apuntes de espera. Colección Gloria Fuertes (Torremozas, Madrid, 2010)
- Parentesco. (Suburbia, 2012)
- Traje roto. (Ejemplar único, Alzira, 2015)

=== Collective works ===
- Bar Sobia magazine (Córdoba, 2007)
- Mephisto. University humanist literary gazette (Complutense University of Madrid, 2008)
- La edad del óxido. Anthology of young Asturian narrators (Laria, 2009)
- Nayagua. Magazine of the José Hierro Poetry Center (2009, 2014)
- MLRS magazine (2009)
- Poetry anthology 50 maneras de ser tu amante (Puntos Suspensivos, 2010)
- Entre sin llamar. Anthology (2013)
- Siete Mundos (Impronta, 2015)
- Exploradoras. Illustrated graphic poetry album by Nathalie Bellón (Libros de la Herida, 2015)
- Lunula magazine
- Mordisco magazine
- Hesperya

=== Festivals and poetry circles ===
- Versátil.es (Valladolid)
- La piedra en el charco (Teruel)
- Cosmopoética (Córdoba)
- Intersecciones (University of Salamanca)
- Poesía Salvaxe (Ferrol)
- La tribu (University of Seville)
