= Second government of Adrián Barbón =

Second Government of Adrián Barbón
- Government of the Principality of Asturias
- 2023-present
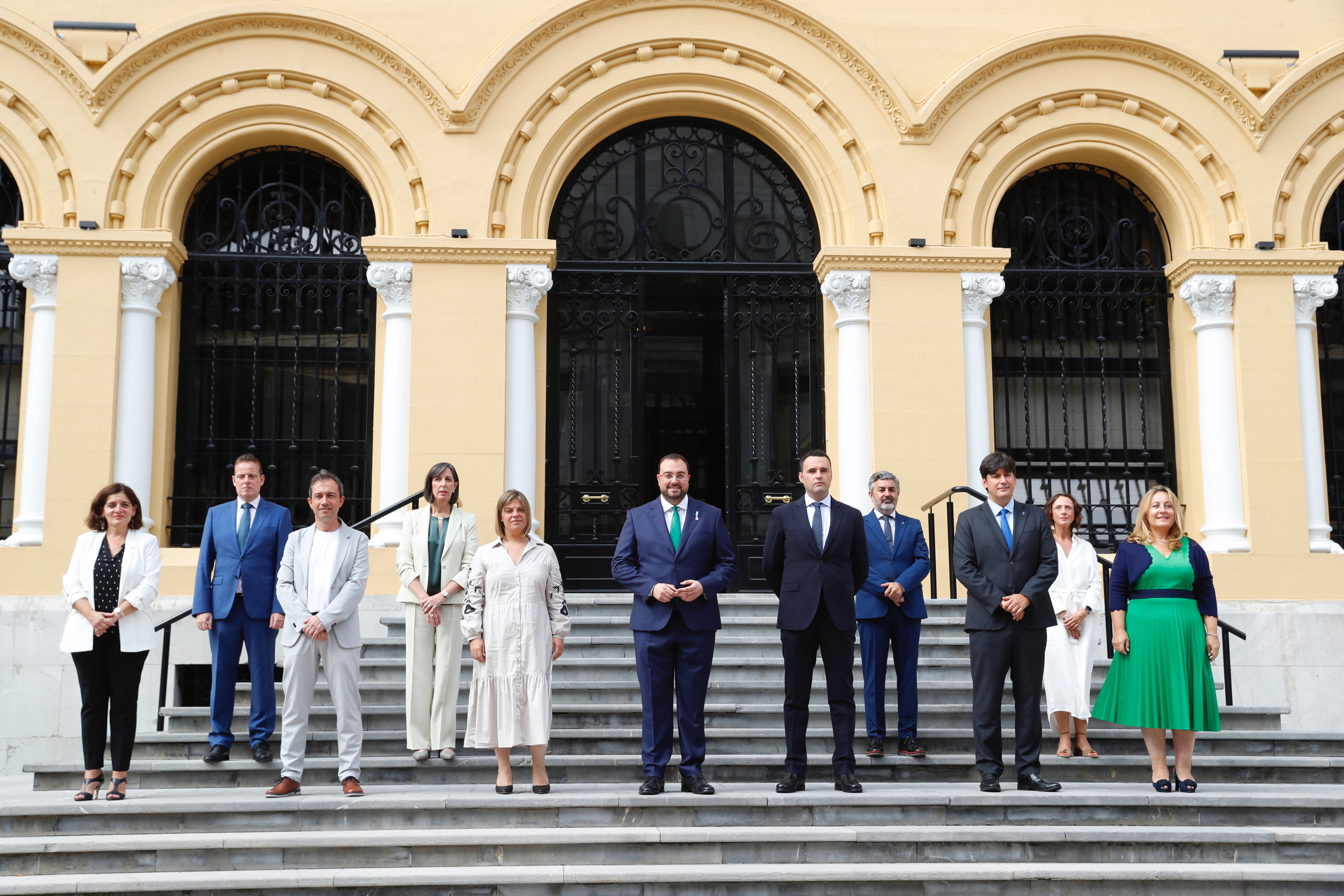
- The government in August 2023.
- Date formed: 1 August 2023

People and organisations
- Monarch: Felipe VI
- President: Adrián Barbón
- Vice President: Gimena Llamedo
- No. of ministers: 10 (Note: Does not include the President.)
- Member party: PSOE; IU–MP–IA
- Status in legislature: Minority coalition government
- Opposition party: PP
- Opposition leader: Diego Canga (until October 2023); Álvaro Queipo (since October 2023)

History
- Election: 2023 regional election
- Legislature term: 12th General Junta
- Budget: 2024
- Predecessor: Barbón I

The second government of Adrián Barbón was formed on 1 August 2023, following the latter's reelection as President of the Principality of Asturias by the General Junta of the Principality of Asturias on 19 July and his swearing-in on 27 July, as a result of the Spanish Socialist Workers' Party (PSOE) emerging as the largest parliamentary force at the 2023 regional election and reaching a coalition agreement with Assembly for Asturias, that comprises United Left of Asturias, More Asturias and Asturian Left. It succeeded his first government and is the incumbent Government of the Principality of Asturias since 1 August 2023.

The cabinet comprises members of the PSOE, United Left and a number of independents.

== Investiture ==
Investiture
Ballot →	19 July 2023	
Required majority →	23 out of 45	
Adrián Barbón (PSOE): • PSOE (19); • IU–MP–IAS (3); • Podemos (1)	23 / 45	check
Abstentions: • PP (17); • Vox (4); • Foro (1)	22 / 45	
Absentees	0 / 45	
