= Teresa Mallada =

Spanish politician

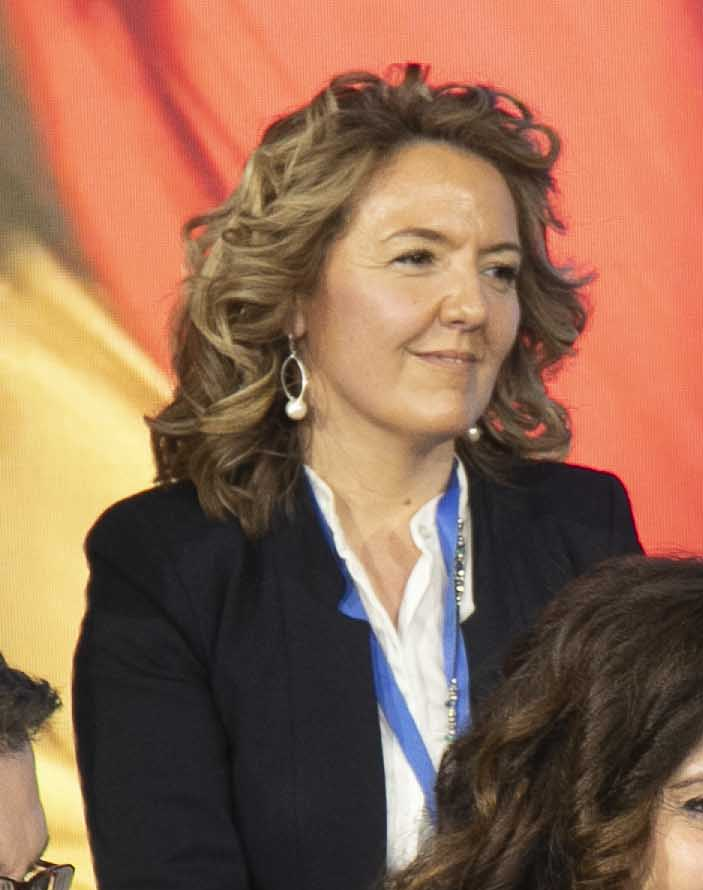

María Teresa Mallada de Castro (born 14 January 1973) is a Spanish People's Party (PP) politician. A mining engineer, she was the first woman and youngest person to be president of the public mining corporation Hunosa (2012–2018). She led her party in the General Junta of the Principality of Asturias from 2019 to 2022, and the following year was elected to the Senate of Spain.

== Biography ==
=== Early life and mining engineering ===
Mallada was born in Cabañaquinta, Asturias to a local father and a mother from the Province of Jaén in Andalusia. She studied Advanced Mining Engineering at the University of Oviedo and began working at a gold mine, before joining the public mining corporation Hunosa initially on an internship in 1999.

At the age of 20, Mallada joined the People's Party (PP), becoming the leader of the New Generations and the party proper in the municipality of Aller. In 2010, she became Vice Secretary of the People's Party of Asturias and was on the list for the 2011 Asturian regional election, without being elected.

In February 2012, Mallada became president of Hunosa. She was the youngest person and first woman to hold the position. She left the corporation's presidency in July 2018 and was one of 164 employees who went into early retirement a year later when she was 46; unions and the state had agreed that those soon to be aged 51 could have early retirement due to the danger of the job.

=== Political career ===
Mallada was personally chosen by PP president Pablo Casado to lead the party in the 2019 Asturian regional election, having polled better than the previous lead candidate Mercedes Fernández. The party came second, dropping one seat to ten. Mallada's selection ahead of Fernández led to a leadership crisis in the Asturian PP, ending when the latter accepted a place in the Senate; the party' regional presidency remained vacant until Mallada assumed it in October 2020.

In September 2022, national PP leader Alberto Núñez Feijóo announced that Mallada would not be the lead candidate for the 2023 Asturian regional election; in November, she resigned her presidency of the party in Asturias. Álvaro Queipo succeeded her as party president and Diego Canga as lead candidate; she remained as the party's spokesperson in the General Junta until the end of the calendar year, when the other deputies signed a document to hand that responsibility to Beatriz Polledo.

Mallada was second on the PP list for the Senate of Spain in the Asturias constituency in the 2023 Spanish general election. She was elected as her party took three of the four seats.
