= Carolina López =

Carolina López may refer to:

- Carolina López (sailor) (born 1975), Spanish Paralympian sailor
- Carolina López (politician) (born 1985), Spanish politician
- Carolina López (handballer) (born 1993), Dominican handball player
- Carolina López-Chacarra (born 2003), Spanish golfer
- Carolina López-Ruiz, Spanish classicist
