= Zapico =

Zapico is a Spanish surname. Notable people with the surname include:

- Emilio Zapico (1944–1996), Spanish motorcyclist
- Ovidio Zapico (born 1971), Spanish politician
