= Queipo =

Surname

Queipo is a surname. Notable people with the surname include:

- Álvaro Queipo (born 1988), Spanish politician
- Antonio Queipo (1931–1979), Spanish equestrian
- Daniel Queipo (born 2002), Spanish footballer
- Francisco de Borja Queipo de Llano, 8th Count of Toreno (1840–1890), Spanish noble and politician
- Gonzalo Queipo de Llano (1875–1951), Spanish Army Officer who fought for the Nationalists during the Spanish Civil War
- José María Queipo de Llano Ruiz de Saravia, 7th Count of Toreno (1786–1843), 19th-century Spanish politician and historian
- Manuel Abad y Queipo (1751–1825), Spanish Roman Catholic bishop of Valladolid
