= Assembly for Asturias =

Assembly for Asturias Convocatoria por Asturias
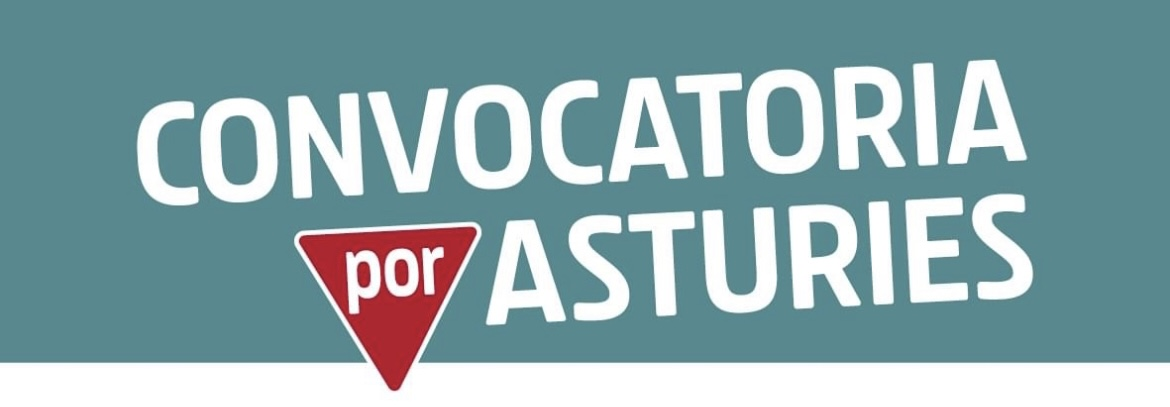
- Abbreviation: CxAst
- Leader: Ovidio Zapico
- Spokesperson: Javier González Vegas
- Founded: 5 April 2023
- Preceded by: Asturias por la Izquierda
- Ideology: Democratic socialism Asturian nationalism Progressivism
- Political position: Left-wing
- Colors: Teal
- Members: United Left of Asturias; Más País; Asturian Left
- General Junta of the Principality of Asturias: 3 / 45
- Mayors (municipalities of Asturias): 9 / 78
- Councillors (municipalities of Asturias): 122 / 922

Assembly for Asturias (Spanish: Convocatoria por Asturias) is a Spanish electoral alliance in the Principality of Asturias, comprising the United Left of Asturias, Más País and the Asturian Left. The alliance was formed for the 2023 Asturian regional election, and local elections in Asturias on the same day. It is led by Ovidio Zapico, leader of the United Left of Asturias.

The alliance won three seats in the regional election, and gave its support to Adrián Barbón as President of Asturias. For this, it was given control of one ministry in the second government of Adrián Barbón, to be run by Zapico.

== History ==
The United Left of Asturias (IU) and the Asturian Left (IAS) ran together in the 2019 Asturian regional election as Asturias por la Izquierda. They obtained two seats.

On 31 March 2023, the IU and Más País announced their alliance and the name of it. Leader Ovidio Zapico had previously been in negotiations in February for Podemos to join the coalition. The list was finally formed by IU, Más País, and the IAS. Five IU members, led by Avilés councillor Fernando Díaz Rañón, threatened to walk out due to what they saw as disproportionately high rankings for members of the smaller parties on the list.

The united list came fourth with 7.6% of the vote in the 2023 Asturian regional election, electing three deputies: Zapico, Delia Campomanes Isidoro and Xabel Vegas. All were elected by the Central constituency. The three deputies and the one from Podemos supported Spanish Socialist Workers' Party (PSOE) leader Adrián Barbón as President of the Principality of Asturias, helping him to a majority of 23 out of 45 seats. In the Second government of Adrián Barbón, it was given one of the eleven ministries: the Ministry of Land Use Planning, Urban Development, Housing and Citizen Rights, to be led by Zapico.

In the 2023 Spanish local elections, the Convocatoria por Oviedo, led by former IU coordinator general Gaspar Llamazares, came fifth in Oviedo with over 10% of the vote, and 3 out of 27 seats. This was no change on the previous result from four years earlier. The Convocatoria por Gijón rose from one seat to two in Gijón, led by Javier Suárez Llana. The party abstained on the vote for mayor, which went to Carmen Moriyón of the People's Party (PP), supported by the Asturias Forum and Vox.

Más País dissolved in late 2023, apart from Más Madrid. Xabel Vegas joined the national executive of Sumar, the platform led by Yolanda Díaz of which all three parties of the Assembly for Asturias were members.
