= Ovidio Zapico =

Spanish politician

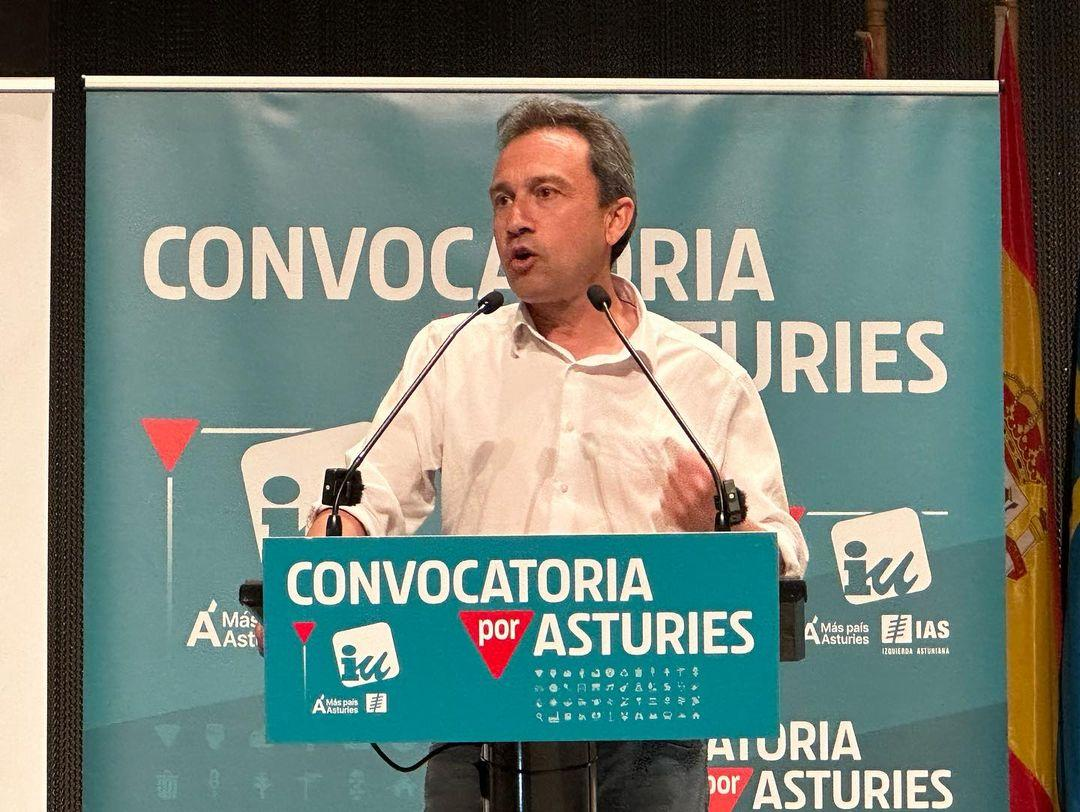

Ovidio Zapico González (born 1971) is a Spanish politician of the United Left (IU). He was a town councillor in Sobrescobio from 2011 to 2017. In 2015, he was elected to the General Junta of the Principality of Asturias.

Zapico was elected coordinator general of the United Left of Asturias in 2020. In 2023, he founded the Assembly for Asturias (CxAst) coalition with Más País and the Asturian Left and supported Adrián Barbón as President of the Principality of Asturias. CxAst formed the second government of Adrián Barbón as the junior partner to the Spanish Socialist Workers' Party (PSOE) and Zapico was given a ministry.

== Biography ==
Zapico was born in Pola de Laviana in Asturias. A hotel manager, he led the United Left (IU) list in the town of Sobrescobio in the 2011 Spanish local elections, aiming to get the party on the council for the first time. He was elected again in 2015, and resigned on 28 November 2017, passing his office to the younger Alejandro Alonso.

Ahead of the 2015 Asturian regional election, Gaspar Llamazares named Zapico third on the IU electoral list in the Central constituency. The party maintained their five seats.

In the 2019 Asturian regional election, the IU fell to two seats in the General Junta of the Principality of Asturias: Ángela Vallina and Zapico. In February 2020, Zapico ran unopposed and became the new coordinator general of the United Left of Asturias, succeeding Ramón Argüelles.

Having already run in 2019 with the Asturian Left as Asturias por la Izquierda, the two added Más País to their list for the 2023 Asturian regional election, and named in Assembly for Asturias (CxAst). The list, led by Zapico, received 7.6% of the votes and had three members elected, all by the Central Constituency. Together with the one deputy from Podemos, they supported Spanish Socialist Workers' Party (PSOE) leader Adrián Barbón as President of the Principality of Asturias, helping him to a majority of 23 out of 45 seats. In the Second government of Adrián Barbón, the PSOE governed with CxAst, and Zapico was given the Ministry of Land Use Planning, Urban Development, Housing and Citizen Rights.

In December 2024, at the 13th Congress of the United Left of Asturias, Zapico was re-elected coordinator general unanimously.
