= Sofía Castañón =

Spanish writer and politician

Sofía Castañón MP
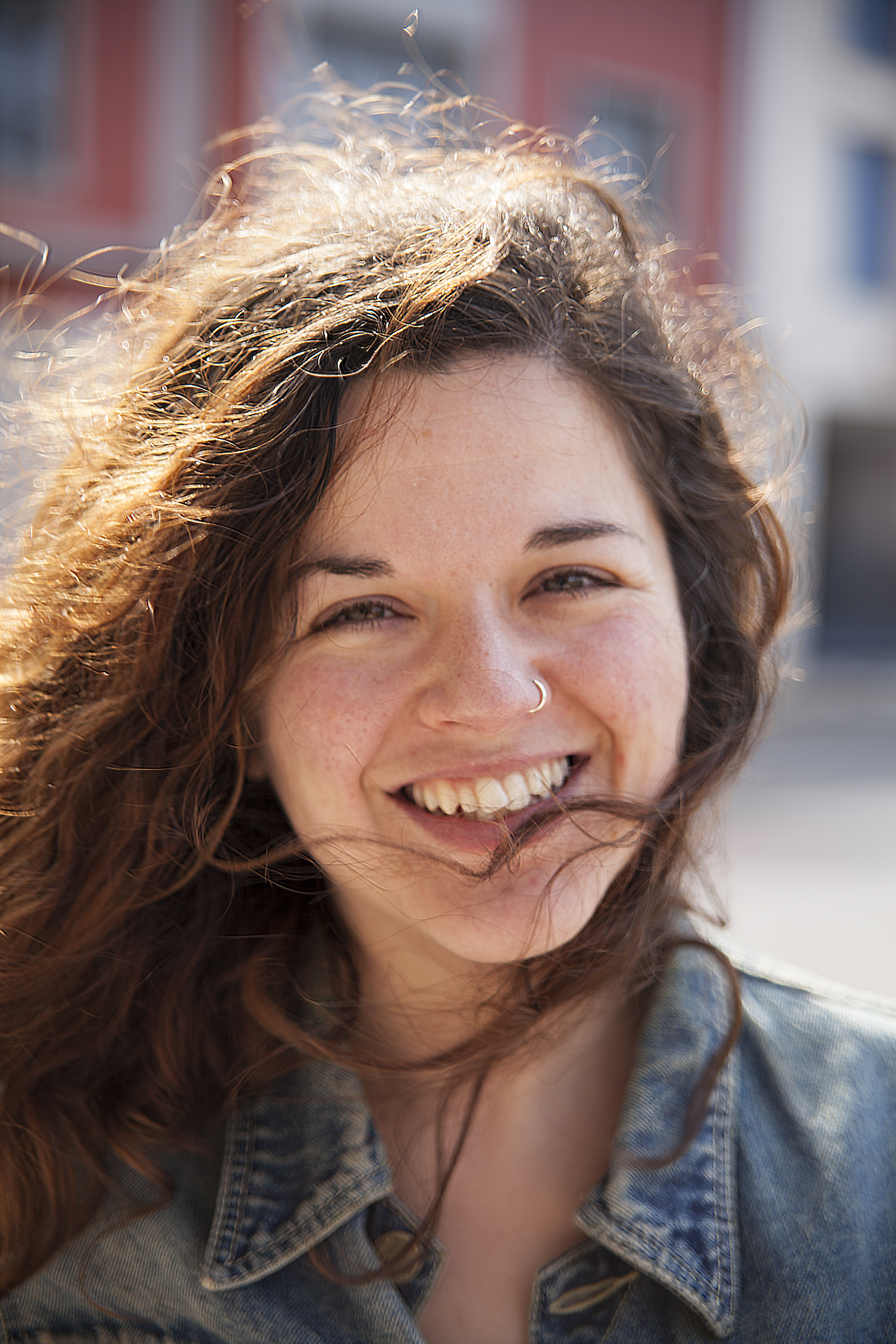

Leader
- Incumbent
- Assumed office 22 December 2021
- Preceded by: Daniel Ripa

Member of the Congress of Deputies
- Incumbent
- Assumed office 13 January 2016
- Constituency: Asturias

Party Secretary of Cultures
- Incumbent
- Assumed office 18 February 2017

Personal details
- Born: Sofía Fernández Castañón; 1 November 1983 (age 43) Gijón, Spain
- Party: Podemos Asturies
- Education: University of Oviedo
- Occupation: Writer, journalist, politician
- Website: Official Facebook

Sofía Fernández Castañón (born 1 November 1983) is a Spanish poet, writer, audiovisual producer, and politician. She has worked in print, television, and radio, and received several poetry prizes. Since January 2016 she has been a member of the Spanish Congress of Deputies for Podemos, representing Asturias, and since 2020 she has served as deputy spokesperson for the Unidas Podemos Confederal Parliamentary Group. In December 2021 she was elected leader of the regional branch of the party, Podemos Asturies. Furthermore, since 2017 she has been a member of the party's national board, where she has served first as Secretary of Intersectional Feminism and LGTBI and currently as Secretary of Cultures.

== Biography ==
One of Sofía Castañón's grandfathers was a foreman of mines, and her family comes from the Cuencas Mineras. The daughter of Asturian writer Laura Castañón, she grew up surrounded by books. She studied Spanish Philology at the University of Oviedo, and combines her poetic activity with journalistic work and creative writing workshops. She has published several books of poetry in Castilian and Asturian, for which she has received awards such as the Asturias Joven in 2006, the Pablo García Baena de Poesía Joven in 2007, and the Nené Losada Rico in 2009.

From 2009 to 2010 she was a scholarship holder for the City Council of Madrid in the Residencia de Estudiantes, and was one of La Casa Encendida's 2010 Voz + Joven poets.

In 2010 and 2011 she directed the radio show El sillón Voltaire on Radio del Círculo de Bellas Artes in Madrid.

From 2012 to 2015 she coordinated municipal reading clubs in Gijón and gave workshops on literary creation and audiovisual narrative, as well as participating in the humorous collective Fundición Príncipe de Astucias (now Fundición Princesa de Astucias).

She participates in the audiovisual production company Señor Paraguas, for which she has created music videos, documentaries, and video art, focusing on culture from a social and political perspective.

She directed her first feature film with this company in 2014, the documentary Se dice poeta. In it, Castañón interviews 21 women born between 1974 and 1989 to discuss their relationship with poetry, criticism, and the dissemination of their work. Taking as a starting point the question about why the term poetess may be preferred if the definition of the word poet encompasses both men and women, this documentary looks at the role of gender in the current poetic panorama in Spain. In the media she has worked at Televisión Local Gijón, Localia, and TeleAsturias.

For Televisión del Principado de Asturias (TPA), she directed the collection Dicires, a visual dictionary of Asturian in 120 clips. She has also written articles for media outlets such as El Comercio, La Corriente Alterna, La Nueva España, Hesperya, Diagonal, and the Huffington Post.

== Political career ==
From January 2015 to February 2017 Castañón was a member of the Citizen Council of Podemos Xixón. In July 2015, she participated in the Podemos state primaries in the list promoted by the national management of Pablo Iglesias, and which was included on the alternative list proposed by the Asturian and Andalusian groups. She was the candidate who received the most votes, with 36,685.

During the Constituent Session of the Congress of the 11th Legislature, she used Asturian to pledge her position with the following formula: "I promise to abide by this Constitution and work to change it. For the memory of our grandmothers, for the future of our children. Never again a country without its people and its towns."

She returned as a candidate in the general elections of July 2016 and was reelected to her seat in the Congress of Deputies, where she is currently the spokesperson of the Equality Commission and a member of the Subcommittee on the State Pact on Gender Violence.

At the Vistalegre II meeting she was a candidate on the Pablo Iglesias list and was elected a member of the Podemos State Citizen Council, ranking 14th with 3,574,113 points (28.79%).

On 18 February 2017, she was elected Secretary of Intersectional Feminism and LGBTI, a position that had not previously existed in the Podemos Executive, and that had been held by Clara Serra in the Citizen Council.

== Works ==
=== Poetry ===
==== In Castilian ====
- Animales interiores (2006 Asturias Joven Award, Trabe 2007)
- Últimas cartas a Kansas (2007 Pablo García Baena Award, La Bella Varsovia 2008)
- La noche así (Ya lo dijo Casimiro Parker, 2012)
- La otra hija (Suburbia Ediciones, 2013)
- Prohibido silbar (Baile del Sol, 2014)

==== In Asturian ====
- Tiempu de render (2009 Nené Losada Award, Trabe 2010)
- Destruimientu del xardín (Hesperya, 2012)

=== Anthologies ===
- Hank Over/Resaca (Caballo de Troya, 2008)
- 23 Pandoras (Baile del Sol, 2009)
- Poetas asturianos para el siglo XXI (Trea, 2009)
- Por partida doble (Trabe, 2009)
- El libro del voyeur (anthologist and illustrator: Pablo Gallo, Ediciones del Viento, 2010)
- Esto no rima (Origami, 2012)
- Gente de Nod (anthologist: Emma Cabal, photographs: Alejandro Nafría; KRK, 2016)

=== Booklets ===
- La sombra de Peter Pan (2009)
- Culpa de Pavlov (2008 Jóvenes Creadores del Ayto Award of Madrid, Colección Resurrección 2012)

=== Documentaries ===
- Se dice poeta (2014). Director

== Awards ==
- 2006 Astragal Award
- 2006 Asturias Joven de Poesía
- 2007 Pablo García Baena de Poesía Joven
- 2009 Nené Losada Rico
- 2010 La Casa Encendida Voz + Joven
- 2012 Astragal Award for the exhibit Paraíso postal
