= Adrián Pumares =

Spanish Politician

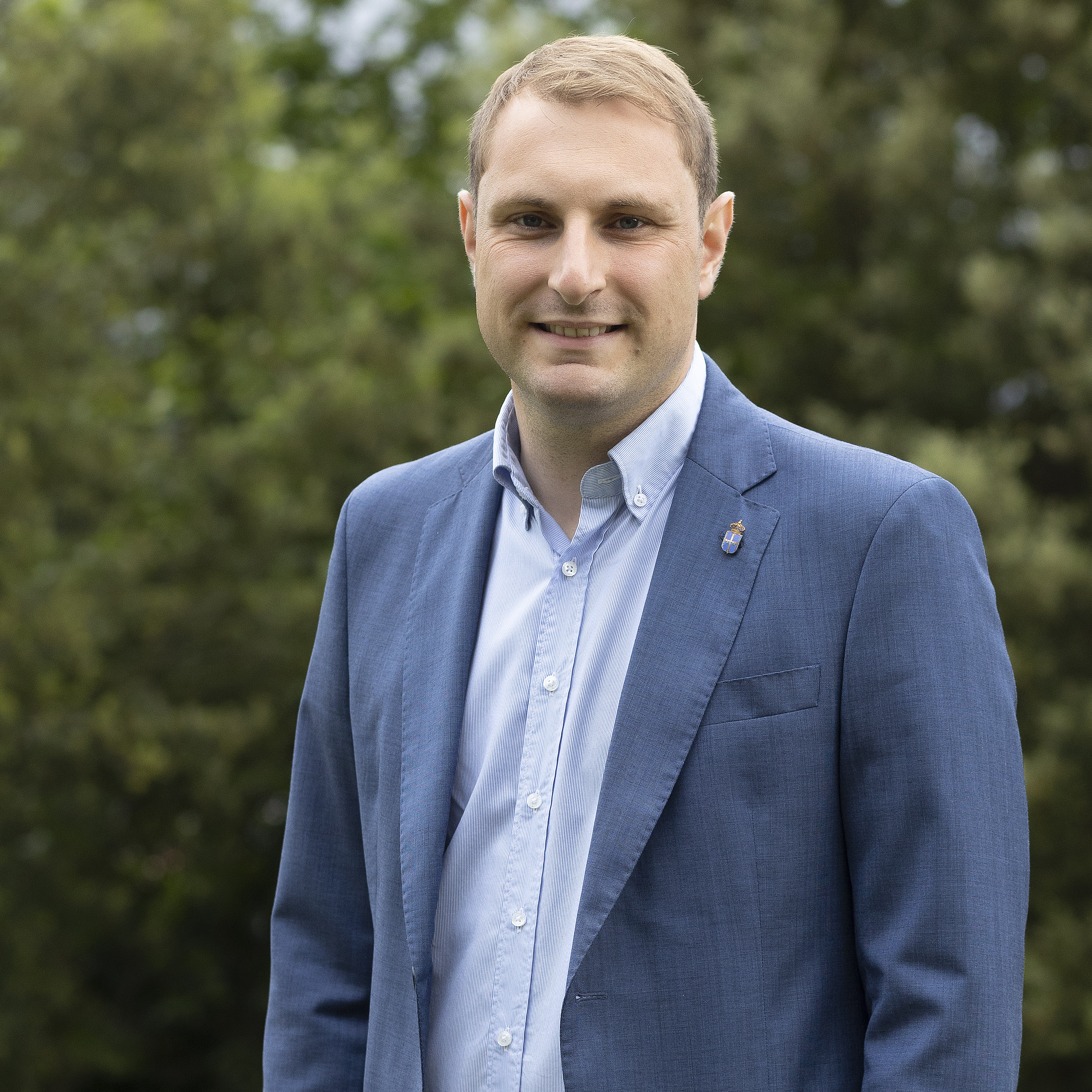

Adrián Pumares Suárez (born 14 June 1989) is a Spanish politician of the party Asturias Forum. He has been the secretary general of the party since 2018. He was elected to the General Junta of the Principality of Asturias in 2019.

== Biography ==
Pumares was born in Laviana in Asturias. His grandfather and father were miners, and he graduated in economics from the University of Oviedo.

Pumares joined the Asturias Forum shortly after it was founded as a splinter from the People's Party (PP) in 2011. He was elected to the town council in Laviana in 2015 but resigned due to concentrating on his professional career.

In September 2018, Carmen Moriyón, president of the Asturias Forum, named Pumares as secretary general. In the 2019 Asturian regional election, only two members of the party were elected to the General Junta of the Principality of Asturias, namely Moriyón and Pumares; the former resigned before taking her seat, leaving the spokesmanship of the party to Pumares.

In October 2021, Pumares supported the government of Adrián Barbón – led by the Spanish Socialist Workers' Party (PSOE) and aided by the United Left (IU) and Podemos – in legislation concerning co-official status for the Asturian language. He was subsequently attacked on billboards by Vox, who accused him of "imposing on a million Asturians a language that is not theirs". Later, Vox released another billboard showing Barbón and Pumares kissing each other, with the slogan "The Adrians want to slip their tongue on you".

At the 5th Congress of the Asturian Forum in October 2022, Moriyón was re-elected to the presidency unanimously, and Pumares named the lead candidate for the 2023 Asturian regional election. The party fell to only having him as a deputy in the legislature. While Moriyón formed a pact with Vox in order to be re-elected mayor of Gijón, Pumares said that such an arrangement made him "uncomfortable"; he said that Vox wished to take powers away from Asturias and that he would support legislation whether from the PSOE or PP as long as it benefitted the region.
