= Álvaro Queipo =

Spanish politician

Álvaro Queipo Somoano (born 9 May 1988) is a Spanish politician of the People's Party (PP). He was a town councillor in Castropol from 2011 to 2020, and was elected to the General Junta of the Principality of Asturias in 2019. Since 2022, he has led the People's Party of Asturias.

== Biography ==
Queipo was born in Oviedo in Asturias, and raised in Castropol from the age of six. His father was a tax administrator and his mother a building society employee, while one of his grandfathers was the first democratically elected mayor of Cangas del Narcea. Queipo received an award from the President of the Principality of Asturias, Vicente Álvarez Areces, for having the best Spanish Baccalaureate results in the region in 2006. He graduated with degrees in industrial engineering from the University of Oviedo. Queipo has been champion of Asturias in rowing, and twice a bronze medallist in national championships.

Queipo joined the People's Party (PP) in 2008 and was elected to the town council in Castropol in 2011. In 2013, he became PP leader in the town and ended a prospective split that would have limited the party to two seats on the council; he ran unsuccessfully for mayor in 2015. In the 2019 local elections, he did not run as list leader in the town, as he was also list leader in the Western District constituency in the regional election. He was elected in both elections.

In November 2020, after being named secretary-general of the People's Party of Asturias, Queipo resigned his local offices. Two years later, after the resignation of Teresa Mallada, he was put in interim charge of the party. In October 2023, Diego Canga resigned from the legislature and Queipo was chosen unanimously as the parliamentary spokesperson of the PP, and therefore leader of the opposition to the Second government of Adrián Barbón. The following month, he took 95.8% of the vote to become the official leader of the PP in Asturias, after a history of internal divisions.
