= Gimena Llamedo =

Spanish politician (born 1981)

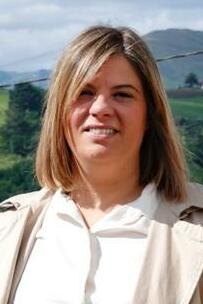
- Llamedo in 2023

Vice President of Asturias
- Incumbent
- Assumed office 1 August 2023
- President: Adrián Barbón
- Preceded by: Juan Cofiño González

Personal details
- Born: 14 July 1981 (age 44)
- Party: Asturian Socialist Federation

Gimena Llamedo González (born 14 July 1981) is a Spanish politician. She has served as vice president of Asturias and as minister of the presidency, demographic challenge, equality and tourism since 2023. Until 2023, she served as deputy secretary general for organization and coordination of the Asturian Socialist Federation.
