= Carolina López (politician) =

Spanish politician

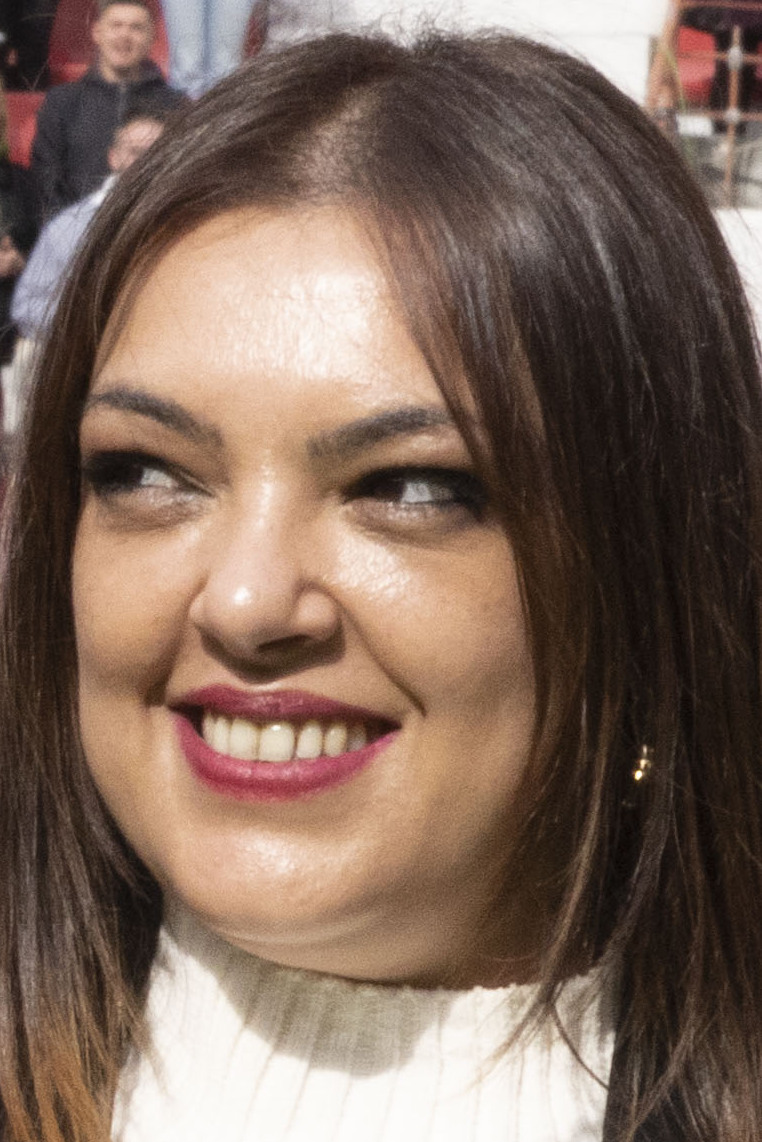

Carolina López Fernández (born 18 January 1985) is a Spanish politician of the party Vox. After four years as a town councillor in Tinéu, she was Vox's lead candidate in the 2023 Asturian regional election, and has since led the party in the General Junta of the Principality of Asturias.

== Biography ==
Born in Tinéu in Asturias, López is one of three children of a couple who ran a restaurant and a nightclub; her grandparents were farmers. She had to relocate to Oviedo at age 16 when the business shut down due to increased household rent. She graduated with a degree in technical architecture from the University of Salamanca.

López had no interest in politics until being told about Vox and its leader Santiago Abascal by her best friend during a weekend in Santander. In the 2019 Spanish local elections, she was elected as the only Vox member of the town council in Tinéu. In January 2023, she was chosen as Vox's lead candidate for the 2023 Asturian regional election, replacing Ignacio Blanco who had left politics. Vox rose from two to four seats on the General Junta of the Principality of Asturias, becoming the third-largest party therein; she said that the moment was not to be celebrated, as the Spanish Socialist Workers' Party (PSOE) of Adrián Barbón continued to govern.

In May 2025, López was chosen by Vox's national executive to be the president of the party in Asturias, the fourth person and first woman to hold the office. The previous holder, José María Figaredo, had spent insufficient time in the principality due to being a member of the Congress of Deputies and holding national roles in the party.
