= Diego Canga =

Spanish civil servant

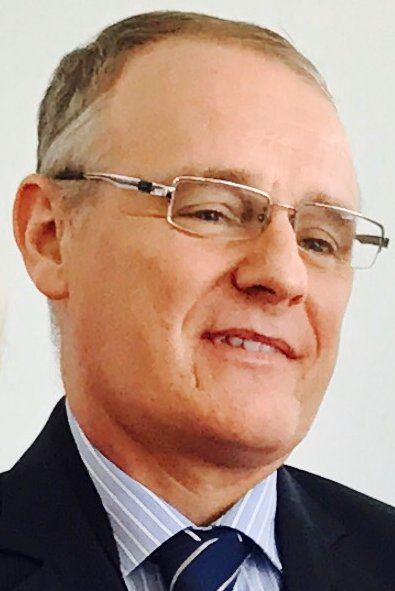

Diego Canga Fano (born 25 December 1964) is a Spanish civil servant for the European Union. He was the lead People's Party (PP) candidate in the 2023 Asturian regional election, and sat in the General Junta of the Principality of Asturias that year.

== Biography ==
Born in Oviedo, Asturias, Canga graduated from the Department of Law at the University of Oviedo and obtained a degree in Special Law of European Affairs from the Université libre de Bruxelles and a certificate in English law from the University of Cambridge. In 1991, he began work as a civil servant within the organs of the European Union: the European Commission, the European Parliament and the Council of the European Union. From February 2017, he worked as chief of cabinet for the President of the European Parliament, Antonio Tajani.

Canga was a founder of Compromiso Asturias XXI, a non-profit organisation that connects emigrants from the region. In September 2018, he received the Silver Medal of Asturias for his work with the organisation.

In November 2022, Canga was chosen as the People's Party (PP) lead candidate in the 2023 Asturian regional election, while the previous lead candidate Teresa Mallada would remain as president of the People's Party of Asturias. The PP rose from 10 seats in the General Junta of the Principality of Asturias to 17 after the election, but was unable to tip the balance to the right, and the Spanish Socialist Workers' Party under Adrián Barbón remained in power. Canga lamented that if the PP had run on a joint list with Asturias Forum, Citizens and a smaller regional party, the right would have won the majority. In October 2023, Canga resigned his seat and left politics for personal reasons.
