= 2023 Asturian regional election =

Election in the Spanish region of Asturias

- 28 May 2023

All 45 seats in the General Junta of the Principality of Asturias 23 seats needed for a majority
- Opinion polls
- Registered: 958,658 ▼1.6%
- Turnout: 545,002 (56.8%) ▲1.7 pp
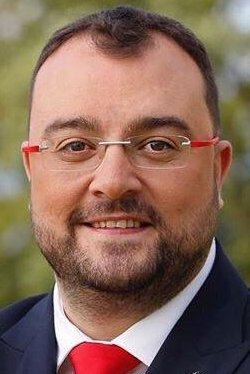

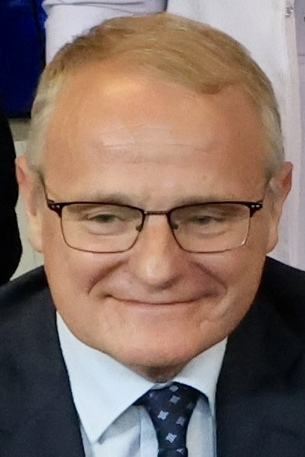

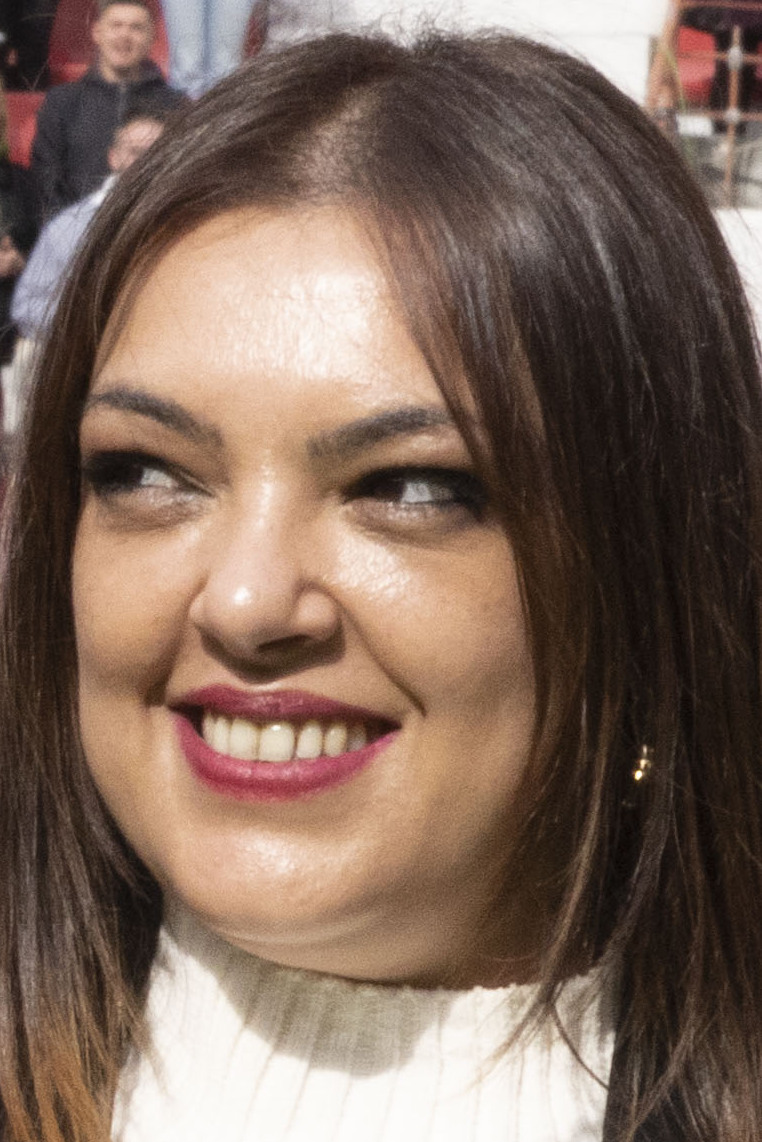

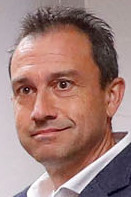

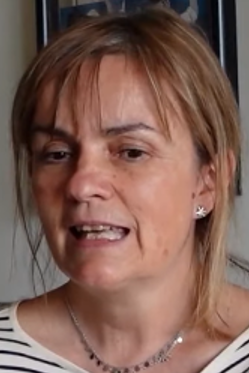

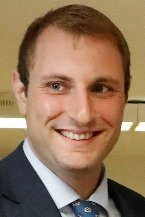
	First party	Second party	Third party
Leader	Adrián Barbón	Diego Canga	Carolina López
Party	PSOE	PP	Vox
Leader since	17 September 2017	28 November 2022	19 January 2023
Leader's seat	Central	Central	Central
Last election	20 seats, 35.3%	10 seats, 17.5%	2 seats, 6.4%
Seats won	19	17	4
Seat change	▼1	▲7	▲2
Popular vote	195,999	175,131	54,273
Percentage	36.5%	32.6%	10.1%
Swing	▲1.2 pp	▲15.1 pp	▲3.7 pp
	Fourth party	Fifth party	Sixth party
Leader	Ovidio Zapico	Covadonga Tomé	Adrián Pumares
Party	IU–MP–IAS	Podemos Asturies	Foro
Leader since	5 April 2023	4 November 2022	1 October 2022
Leader's seat	Central	Central	Central
Last election	2 seats, 6.6% (Note: Results for IU–IAS in the 2019 election.)	4 seats, 11.0%	2 seats, 6.5%
Seats won	3	1	1
Seat change	▲1	▼3	▼1
Popular vote	40,774	21,052	19,652
Percentage	7.6%	3.9%	3.7%
Swing	▲1.0 pp	▼7.1 pp	▼2.8 pp
President before election
Adrián Barbón
PSOE
Elected President
Adrián Barbón
PSOE

A regional election was held in Asturias on 28 May 2023 to elect the 12th General Junta of the autonomous community. All 45 seats in the General Junta were up for election. It was held concurrently with regional elections in eleven other autonomous communities and local elections all across Spain.

== Overview ==
Under the 1981 Statute of Autonomy, the General Junta of the Principality of Asturias was the unicameral legislature of the homonymous autonomous community, having legislative power in devolved matters, as well as the ability to grant or withdraw confidence from a regional president. The electoral and procedural rules were supplemented by national law provisions.

=== Date ===
The term of the General Junta of the Principality of Asturias expired four years after the date of its previous election., with election day being fixed for the fourth Sunday of May every four years. The election decree was required to be issued no later than 54 days before the scheduled election date and published on the following day in the Official Gazette of the Principality of Asturias (BOPA). The previous election was held on 26 May 2019, setting the date for election day on the fourth Sunday of May four years later, which was 28 May 2023.

The regional president had the prerogative to dissolve the General Junta of the Principality of Asturias at any given time and call a snap election, provided that no motion of no confidence was in process, no nationwide election was due and some time requirements were met: namely, that dissolution did not occur either during the first legislative session or during the last year of parliament before its planned expiration, nor before one year after a previous one. In the event of an investiture process failing to elect a regional president within a two-month period from the first ballot, the General Junta was to be automatically dissolved and a fresh election called. Any snap election held as a result of these circumstances did not alter the date of the chamber's next ordinary election, with elected lawmakers serving the remainder of its original four-year term.

The election to the General Junta of the Principality of Asturias was officially called on 4 April 2023 with the publication of the corresponding decree in the BOPA, setting election day for 28 May.

=== Electoral system ===
Voting for the General Junta was based on universal suffrage, comprising all Spanish nationals over 18 years of age, registered in Asturias and with full political rights, provided that they had not been deprived of the right to vote by a final sentence.

The General Junta had a minimum of 35 and a maximum of 45 seats, with electoral provisions fixing its size at the latter number. All were elected in three multi-member constituencies—corresponding to sub-provincial divisions, each of which was assigned an initial minimum of two seats and the remaining 39 distributed in proportion to population—using the D'Hondt method and closed-list proportional voting, with a three percent-threshold of valid votes (including blank ballots) in each constituency. The use of this electoral method resulted in a higher effective threshold depending on district magnitude and vote distribution.

As a result of the aforementioned allocation, each General Junta constituency (comprising the municipalities indicated below) was entitled the following seats:

Seats	Constituencies	Municipalities
34	Central	Aller, Avilés, Bimenes, Carreño, Caso, Castrillón, Corvera de Asturias, Gijón, Gozón, Illas, Las Regueras, Langreo, Laviana, Lena, Llanera, Mieres, Morcín, Noreña, Oviedo, Proaza, Quirós, Ribera de Arriba, Riosa, San Martín del Rey Aurelio, Santo Adriano, Sariego, Siero, Sobrescobio, Soto del Barco
6	Western	Allande, Belmonte de Miranda, Boal, Candamo, Cangas del Narcea, Castropol, Coaña, Cudillero, Degaña, El Franco, Grado, Grandas de Salime, Ibias, Illano, Muros de Nalón, Navia, Pesoz, Pravia, Salas, San Martín de Oscos, Santa Eulalia de Oscos, San Tirso de Abres, Somiedo, Tapia de Casariego, Taramundi, Teverga, Tineo, Valdés, Vegadeo, Villanueva de Oscos, Villayón, Yernes y Tameza
5	Eastern	Amieva, Cabrales, Cabranes, Cangas de Onís, Caravia, Colunga, Llanes, Nava, Onís, Parres, Peñamellera Alta, Peñamellera Baja, Piloña, Ponga, Ribadedeva, Ribadesella, Villaviciosa

The law did not provide for by-elections to fill vacant seats; instead, any vacancies arising after the proclamation of candidates and during the legislative term were filled by the next candidates on the party lists or, when required, by designated substitutes.

=== Outgoing parliament ===
The table below shows the composition of the parliamentary groups in the chamber at the time of the election call.

Parliamentary composition in April 2023
Groups	Parties	Legislators	
Groups	Parties	Seats	Total
Socialist Parliamentary Group	PSOE	20	20
People's Parliamentary Group	PP	10	10
Citizens Parliamentary Group	CS	4	4
We Can Asturias Parliamentary Group	Podemos	4	4
Asturias Forum Parliamentary Group	Foro	2	2
United Left Parliamentary Group	IU/IX	2	2
Vox Parliamentary Group	Vox	2	2
Mixed Parliamentary Group	INDEP	1 (Note: Luis Armando Fernández Bartolomé, former CS legislator.)	1

== Parties and candidates ==
The electoral law allowed for parties and federations registered in the interior ministry, alliances and groupings of electors to present lists of candidates. Parties and federations intending to form an alliance were required to inform the relevant electoral commission within 10 days of the election call, whereas groupings of electors needed to secure the signature of at least one percent of the electorate in the constituencies for which they sought election, disallowing electors from signing for more than one list. Additionally, a balanced composition of men and women was required in the electoral lists, so that candidates of either sex made up at least 40 percent of the total composition.

Below is a list of the main parties and alliances which contested the election:

Candidacy	Parties and alliances	Leading candidate	Ideology	Previous result		Gov.	Ref.
Candidacy	Parties and alliances	Leading candidate	Ideology	Vote %	Seats	Gov.	Ref.
PSOE	List: Spanish Socialist Workers' Party (PSOE)	Adrián Barbón	Social democracy	35.3%	20	Yes	
PP	List: People's Party (PP)	Diego Canga	Conservatism; Christian democracy	17.5%	10	No	
CS	List: Citizens–Party of the Citizenry (CS)	Manuel Iñarra	Liberalism	14.0%	5	No	
Podemos; Asturies	List: We Can Asturias (Podemos Asturies)	Covadonga Tomé	Left-wing populism Direct democracy Democratic socialism	11.0%	4	No	
IU–MP–IAS	List: United Left of Asturias (IU/IX) – Communist Party of Asturias (PCA) – The Dawn Marxist Organization (La Aurora (OM)) – Republican Left (IR); More Country (Más País); Asturian Left (IAS)	Ovidio Zapico	Socialism; Communism	6.6%	2	No	
Foro	List: Asturias Forum (Foro)	Adrián Pumares	Regionalism; Conservatism	6.5%	2	No	
Vox	List: Vox (Vox)	Carolina López	Right-wing populism Ultranationalism; National conservatism	6.4%	2	No	

== Campaign ==
=== Debates ===
2023 Asturian regional election debates
Date	Organizer(s)	Moderator(s)	P Present (Note: Denotes a main invitee attending the event.)								
Date	Organizer(s)	Moderator(s)	PSOE	PP	CS	Podemos	CxAst	Foro	Vox	Audience	Ref.
17 May	RTPA	Nacho Monserrat; Natalia Alonso	P Barbón	P Canga	P Iñarra	P Tomé	P Zapico	P Pumares	P López	6.8% (19,000)	

== Opinion polls ==
The tables below list opinion polling results in reverse chronological order, showing the most recent first and using the dates when the survey fieldwork was done, as opposed to the date of publication. Where the fieldwork dates are unknown, the date of publication is given instead. The highest percentage figure in each polling survey is displayed with its background shaded in the leading party's colour. If a tie ensues, this is applied to the figures with the highest percentages. The "Lead" column on the right shows the percentage-point difference between the parties with the highest percentages in a poll.

=== Graphical summary ===
Local regression trend line of poll results from 26 May 2019 to 28 May 2023, with each line corresponding to a political party.

=== Voting intention estimates ===
The table below lists weighted voting intention estimates. Refusals are generally excluded from the party vote percentages, while question wording and the treatment of "don't know" responses and those not intending to vote may vary between polling organisations. When available, seat projections determined by the polling organisations are displayed below (or in place of) the percentages in a smaller font; 23 seats were required for an absolute majority in the General Junta of the Principality of Asturias.

Polling firm/Commissioner	Fieldwork date	Sample size	Turnout	PSOE	PP	CS	Podemos	CxAst	Foro	Vox	Unidas Podemos	SOS	Lead
2023 regional election	28 May 2023	—N/a	56.8	36.5; 19	32.6; 17	0.9; 0	3.9; 1	7.6; 3	3.7; 1	10.1; 4	–	1.1; 0	3.9
NC Report/La Razón	22 May 2023	?	?	36.8; 19/20	32.3; 17/18	–	(Note: Within Unidas Podemos.)		4.8; 1	9.3; 3	10.5; 4	–	4.5
KeyData/Público	17 May 2023	?	60.1	35.7; 19	29.8; 16	1.8; 0	7.6; 3	6.4; 2	4.7; 1	9.3; 4	–	–	5.9
EM-Analytics/El Plural	11–17 May 2023	600	?	37.2; 20	28.8; 16	2.0; 0	6.6; 2	6.4; 2	4.6; 1	10.7; 4	–	0.9; 0	8.4
GESOP/La Nueva España	2–17 May 2023	2,806	?	36.4; 18/20	29.5; 15/16	2.0; 0	5.3; 2	7.3; 3	4.1; 1	10.2; 4/5	–	1.0; 0	6.9
EM-Analytics/El Plural	4–10 May 2023	600	?	37.1; 20	28.8; 16	2.1; 0	6.5; 2	6.6; 2	4.6; 1	10.7; 4	–	0.8; 0	8.3
GAD3/Vocento	28 Apr–3 May 2023	1,004	?	37.8; 19/20	31.9; 17	1.3; 0	5.0; 2	6.3; 2	4.7; 1	9.9; 3/4	–	–	5.9
EM-Analytics/El Plural	26 Apr–3 May 2023	600	?	37.3; 20	29.4; 16	2.2; 0	6.3; 2	6.3; 2	4.8; 1	10.4; 4	–	0.8; 0	7.9
Sondaxe/La Voz de Asturias	24 Apr–2 May 2023	800	?	34.5; 19	28.8; 16	2.6; 0	9.3; 4	6.6; 2	4.6; 1	8.1; 3	–	–	5.7
CIS	10–26 Apr 2023	494	?	36.7	27.3	3.7	8.0	6.8	4.5	9.1	–	–	9.4
EM-Analytics/El Plural	19–25 Apr 2023	600	?	37.3; 20	28.5; 15	2.1; 0	6.3; 2	6.6; 2	5.1; 2	10.8; 4	–	0.9; 0	8.8
GAD3/PP	14–18 Apr 2023	1,014	?	36.3; 18/19	33.9; 17	1.3; 0	7.0; 2/3	5.2; 2	2.3; 0/1	10.8; 4/5	–	–	2.4
EM-Analytics/El Plural	12–18 Apr 2023	600	?	37.7; 20	27.9; 15	2.1; 0	7.0; 2	6.1; 2	5.2; 2	11.0; 4	–	0.9; 0	9.8
Simple Lógica/elDiario.es	4–13 Apr 2023	452	?	36.6; 19/20	27.8; 15/16	3.0; 0	5.8; 2/3	12.9; 3/4	3.4; 0/1	8.9; 3/4	–	–	8.8
EM-Analytics/El Plural	5–11 Apr 2023	600	?	38.5; 20	26.6; 13	1.8; 0	7.3; 3	6.5; 2	5.1; 2	11.2; 4	–	0.9; 1	11.9
EM-Analytics/El Plural	27 Mar–4 Apr 2023	600	?	38.8; 20	26.0; 13	1.7; 0	7.4; 3	6.5; 2	5.1; 2	11.5; 4	–	0.9; 1	12.8
NC Report/La Razón	3–10 Mar 2023	?	54.9	33.4; 18	31.4; 17	–			5.0; 1	8.9; 3	15.2; 6	–	2.0
GAD3/IU (Note: Extrapolation from results for the Central District.)	1–7 Mar 2023	2,003	?	34.8; 18/19	32.4; 16	2.3; 0	8.3; 3	6.0; 2	4.8; 1/2	10.4; 4	–	–	2.4
EM-Analytics/Electomanía	15 Jan–26 Feb 2023	1,101	?	? 21	? 12	? 0	? 3	? 2	? 2	? 4	–	? 1	?
Sigma Dos/El Mundo	9–15 Dec 2022	711	?	33.9; 19	26.9; 15	4.5; 0/1	8.8; 3/4	6.4; 2	4.7; 0/1	10.9; 4	–	–	7.0
CIS (Note: Vote+Simpathy figures with undecided and/or abstentionists excluded.)	17 Nov–2 Dec 2022	266	?	45.5	19.3	1.6			0.5	8.4	14.9	–	26.2
EM-Analytics/Electomanía	1 Jun–13 Jul 2022	231	?	42.1; 22	19.5; 11	1.6; 0	7.8; 3	6.4; 2	5.4; 2	13.0; 5	–	0.8; 0	22.6
Metroscopia/PP	23–29 Jun 2022	800	?	33.7; 17	35.4; 19	1.0; 0	8.7; 3	5.1; 2	1.6; 0	11.5; 4	–	–	1.7
La Nueva España	23 Mar–7 Apr 2022	?	?	? 20/21	? 10	? 0	? 4	? 2	? 2	? 4/5	–	–	?
EM-Analytics/Electomanía	15 Oct–29 Nov 2021	1,093	?	41.4; 23	20.6; 11	2.1; 0	8.4; 3	6.4; 2	6.5; 2	11.1; 4	–	–	20.8
EM-Analytics/Electomanía	15 Apr 2021	800	?	42.4; 22	21.5; 11	4.0; 1	7.7; 3	5.2; 2	5.4; 2	10.0; 4	–	–	20.9
SyM Consulting	27–31 Dec 2020	1,276	60.6	35.8; 18	16.9; 8	9.1; 4	13.9; 6/7	6.9; 3	6.4; 2	8.2; 3/4	–	–	18.9
ElectoPanel/Electomanía	1 Apr–15 May 2020	?	?	43.3; 23	19.6; 10	7.2; 2	5.8; 2	7.2; 3	5.0; 1	10.0; 4	–	–	23.7
SyM Consulting	4–6 May 2020	1,194	62.2	43.9; 23/24	19.8; 10	6.4; 2	6.3; 2/3	6.6; 2	4.2; 1	11.1; 4	–	–	24.1
November 2019 general election	10 Nov 2019	—N/a	58.1	33.3	23.2	6.7			(Note: Within PP.)	15.9	16.0	–	10.1
2019 regional election	26 May 2019	—N/a	55.1	35.3; 20	17.5; 10	14.0; 5	11.0; 4	6.6; 2	6.5; 2	6.4; 2	–	–	17.8

=== Voting preferences ===
The table below lists raw, unweighted voting preferences.

Polling firm/Commissioner	Fieldwork date	Sample size	PSOE	PP	CS	Podemos	CxAst	Foro	Vox	Unidas Podemos	Question	X mark	Lead
2023 regional election	28 May 2023	—N/a	23.2	20.7	0.6	2.5	4.8	2.3	6.4	–	—N/a	35.6	2.5
Sondaxe/La Voz de Asturias	24 Apr–2 May 2023	800	19.0	15.9	–	4.3	2.9	–	3.9	–	–	–	3.1
CIS	10–26 Apr 2023	494	28.9	19.7	1.7	4.5	5.6	2.8	6.2	–	25.6	1.7	9.2
CIS	17 Nov–2 Dec 2022	266	25.9	12.7	0.6			0.4	6.5	9.5	34.6	4.4	13.2
November 2019 general election	10 Nov 2019	—N/a	21.6	15.1	4.3				10.3	10.4	—N/a	34.5	6.5
2019 regional election	26 May 2019	—N/a	21.8	10.8	8.6	6.8	4.1	4.0	4.0	–	—N/a	37.6	11.0

== Results ==
=== Overall ===
← Summary of the 28 May 2023 General Junta of the Principality of Asturias election results →
Parties and alliances	Popular vote			Seats	
Parties and alliances	Votes	%	±pp	Total	+/−
Spanish Socialist Workers' Party (PSOE)	195,999	36.50	+1.24	19	−1
People's Party (PP)	175,131	32.61	+15.09	17	+7
Vox (Vox)	54,273	10.11	+3.68	4	+2
Assembly for Asturias United Left–More Country–Asturian Left (IU–MP–IAS)^{1}	40,774	7.59	+0.97	3	+1
We Can Asturias (Podemos Asturies)	21,052	3.92	−7.12	1	−3
Asturias Forum (Foro)	19,652	3.66	−2.86	1	−1
SOS Asturias–Empty Spain (SOS Asturias)	5,838	1.09	New	0	±0
Citizens–Party of the Citizenry (CS)	4,974	0.93	−13.04	0	−5
Animalist Party with the Environment (PACMA)^{2}	3,271	0.61	−0.03	0	±0
Greens–Equo Asturias (V–Q)	1,717	0.32	−0.08	0	±0
Communist Party of the Workers of Spain (PCTE)	1,401	0.26	+0.06	0	±0
Andecha Astur (Andecha)	1,245	0.23	−0.07	0	±0
Unite Principality (SMP)	1,148	0.21	New	0	±0
For a Fairer World (PUM+J)	789	0.15	New	0	±0
State of Spain Unionist Party (PUEDE)	236	0.04	New	0	±0
Blank ballots	9,523	1.77	+0.67		
Total	537,023			45	±0
Valid votes	537,023	98.54	−0.52		
Invalid votes	7,979	1.46	+0.52		
Votes cast / turnout	545,002	56.85	+1.73		
Abstentions	413,656	43.15	−1.73		
Registered voters	958,658				
Sources
Footnotes: ^{1} Assembly for Asturias United Left–More Country–Asturian Left results are compared to United Left–Asturian Left: Asturias by the Left totals in the 2019 election.; ^{2} Animalist Party with the Environment results are compared to Animalist Party Against Mistreatment of Animals totals in the 2019 election.

Popular vote
PSOE	36.50%
PP	32.61%
Vox	10.11%
IU–MP–IAS	7.59%
Podemos Ast.	3.92%
Foro	3.66%
SOS Asturias	1.09%
Others	2.75%
Blank ballots	1.77%

Seats
PSOE	42.22%
PP	37.78%
Vox	8.89%
IU–MP–IAS	6.67%
Podemos Ast.	2.22%
Foro	2.22%

=== Distribution by constituency ===
Constituency	PSOE		PP		Vox		CxAst		Podemos		Foro	
Constituency	%	S	%	S	%	S	%	S	%	S	%	S
Central	36.2	13	32.0	12	10.7	4	8.2	3	4.3	1	3.2	1
Eastern	38.3	3	36.4	2	9.5	−	4.7	−	2.6	−	3.9	−
Western	37.0	3	35.0	3	6.5	−	5.4	−	1.7	−	6.7	−
Total	36.5	19	32.6	17	10.1	4	7.6	3	3.9	1	3.7	1

== Aftermath ==
Barbón was elected invested as President with majority in the first voting.

Investiture
Ballot →	19 July 2023	
Required majority →	23 out of 45	
Adrián Barbón (PSOE): • PSOE (19); • IU–MP–IAS (3); • Podemos (1)	23 / 45	check
Abstentions: • PP (17); • Vox (4); • Foro (1)	22 / 45	
Absentees	0 / 45	

== Bibliography ==
- Ley Orgánica 5/1985, de 19 de junio, del Régimen Electoral General (Organic Law 5/1985). Official State Gazette (in Spanish). 19 June 1985 [version as of 3 October 2022]. BOE-A-1985-11672.
- Ley Orgánica 7/1981, de 30 de diciembre, de Estatuto de Autonomía para Asturias (Organic Law 7/1981). Official State Gazette (in Spanish). 30 December 1981 [version as of 17 July 2010]. BOE-A-1982-634.
- Ley 6/1984, de 5 de julio, del Presidente y del Consejo de Gobierno del Principado de Asturias (Law 6/1984). Official State Gazette (in Spanish). 5 July 1984 [version as of 24 September 2018]. BOE-A-1984-19762.
- Ley 14/1986, de 26 de diciembre, sobre régimen de elecciones a la Junta General del Principado de Asturias (Law 14/1986). Official State Gazette (in Spanish). 26 December 1986 [version as of 27 March 1991]. BOE-A-1987-3910.
- Decreto 11/2023, de 3 de abril, del Presidente del Principado, por el que se convocan elecciones a la Junta General del Principado de Asturias (PDF) (Decree 11/2023). Official Gazette of the Principality of Asturias (in Spanish). 3 April 2023. 2023-02827.
