= Daniel Ripa =

Spanish psychologist and politician

- Daniel Marí Ripa
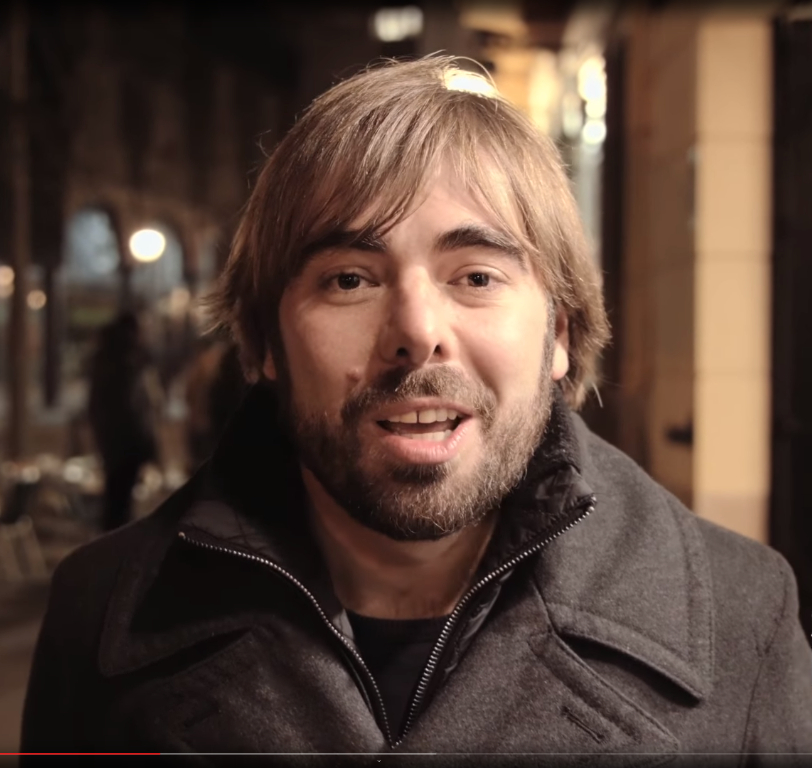

Secretary-General of Podemos Asturias
- Incumbent
- Assumed office 14 February 2015
- Preceded by: Position established

Deputy in the General Junta of the Principality of Asturias
- Incumbent
- Assumed office 16 June 2015
- Constituency: Asturias

Personal details
- Born: 25 July 1982 (age 44) Jaca, Spain
- Party: Podemos Asturias
- Education: Psychology; Work's Science
- Alma mater: University of Oviedo; UNED

Daniel Marí Ripa (Jaca, Spain, 25 July 1982) is a Spanish politician, deputy in the General Junta of the Principality of Asturias and member of Podemos.

== Biography ==
Daniel Ripa graduated in Psychology and Work Science by the University of Oviedo, has an expertise in Social Inclusion Policies by the UNED and has a PhD in Psychology from the University of Oviedo. He has had various jobs as a job counselor, waiter, drug prevention technician, librarian, warehouse clerk or social cooperation manager until he began his predoctoral research about the impact of companies on health.

In February 2015 he was elected Secretary-General of Podemos in Asturias, getting a seat as deputy in the regional elections of May.

In December 2017, he was reelected Secretary-General of Podemos Asturias.
