= Asturian Left =

Asturian Left Izquierda Asturiana
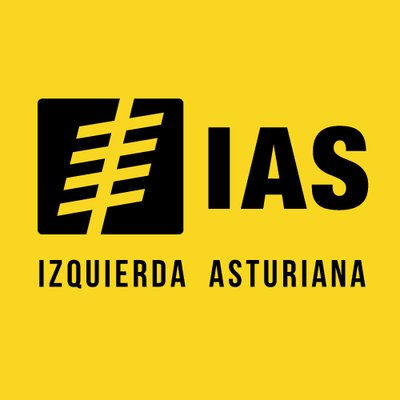
- Spokesperson: Faustino Zapico Álvarez
- Founded: 1992
- Headquarters: Oviedo
- Youth wing: Mocedá d'Izquierda Asturiana
- Ideology: Asturian nationalism Socialism; Ecologism
- Political position: Left-wing
- National affiliation: Popular Unity (2015–2016); Unidos Podemos (2016); Sumar (2023–2026); Broad Front (since 2026)
- Regional affiliation: Convocatoria por Asturias (since 2023)
- Union affiliation: Corriente Sindical d'Izquierda
- General Junta of the Principality of Asturias: 0 / 45

Website
- www.ias.as

Izquierda Asturiana (IAS; English: Asturian Left) is an Asturian nationalist leftist political party of Asturias, Spain.

== History ==
Izquierda Asturiana was founded in 1992 by former members of the Unidá Nacionalista Asturiana. In the European Parliamentary elections of 2004, they made contact with Andecha Astur but could not agree on a platform, so they ran separate candidates.

In the 2015 Spanish general election they were a part of the Popular Unity coalition. In the 2016 Spanish general election they ran within the Unidos Podemos coalition. They were part of a coalition pact with United Left of Asturias in the 2019 Asturian regional election, and in the 2023 Asturian regional election, Más País was added to form Convocatoria por Asturias. In the 2023 Spanish general election, the party formed part of the Sumar coalition.

== Ideology ==
Among the party's objectives is the defense of the Asturian language, as well as the promotion of Asturian leftist politics without the influence of an outside party.
