= Podemos Asturias =

Podemos Asturias Podemos Asturies
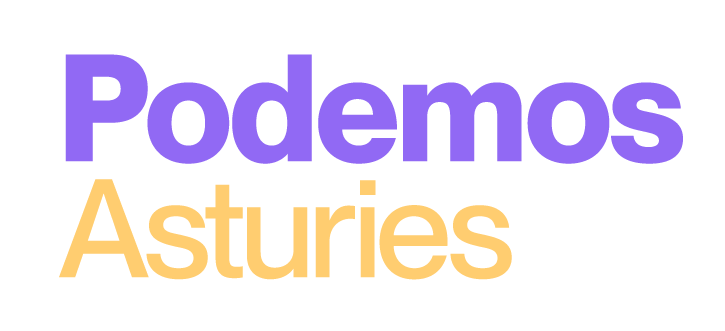
- Secretary General: Sofía Castañón
- Headquarters: c/ Jesús, 16, Oviedo, Asturias
- Ideology: Left-wing populism
- Political position: Left-wing
- National affiliation: Podemos
- Colours: Purple
- General Junta: 0 / 45
- Congress of Deputies (Asturian seats): 0 / 7

Website
- asturias.podemos.info

Podemos Asturias (Asturian: Podemos Asturies) is the regional branch of Podemos in Asturias, Spain.

== History ==
=== Beginning and first elections ===
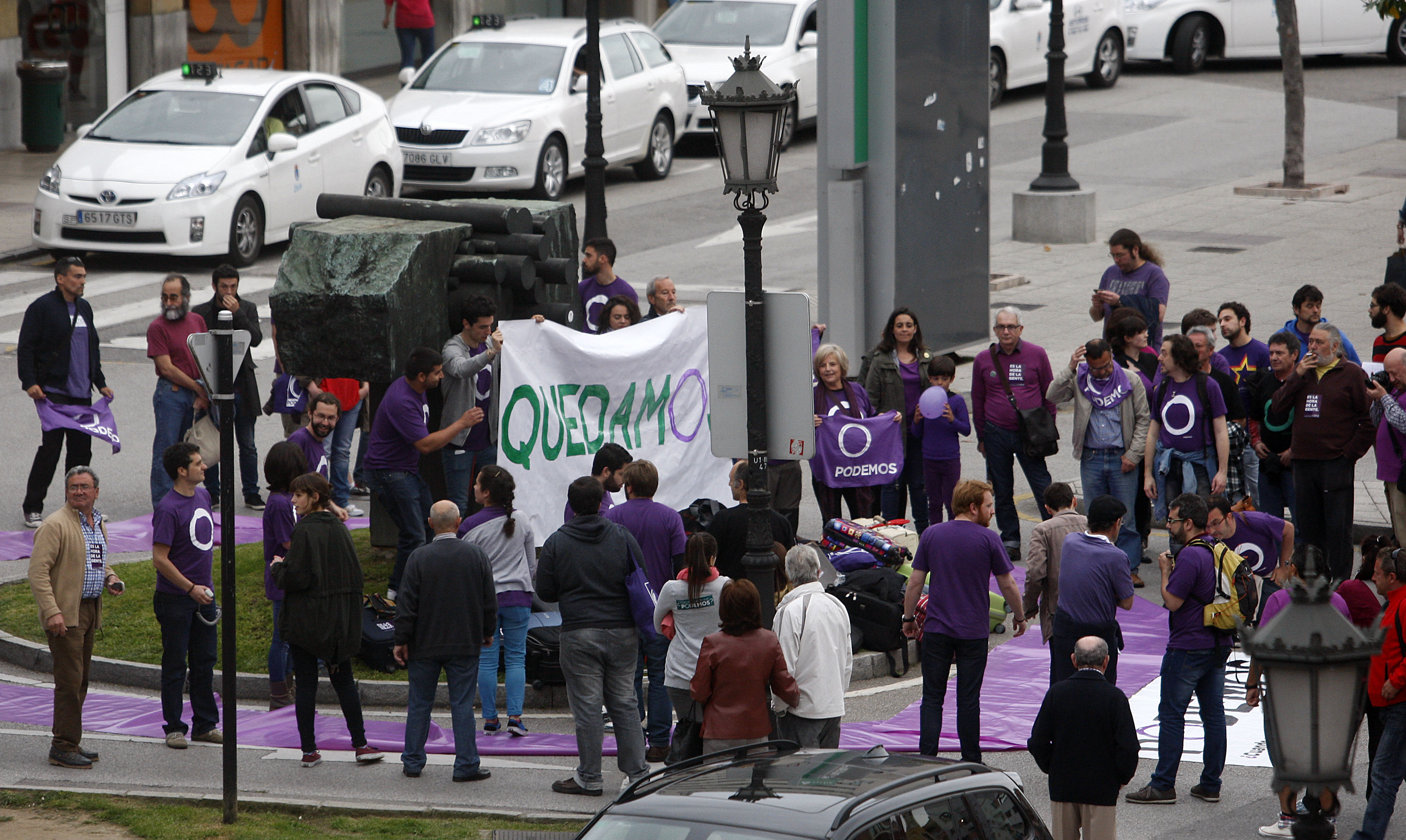
Start of the electoral campaign of Podemos Asturias for the 2014 European elections, in Oviedo.

The Podemos movement was officially launched on 16 January 2014 in the Teatro del Barrio in the Lavapiés neighbourhood of Madrid, with a press conference attended by hundreds of people. One of the organisers was Asturian economist Segundo González, who later became a member of the Congress of Deputies. As a result, in Asturias the formation of one of the 'circles' in which the party is organised at a territorial level began to take shape. The first steps of Podemos in the region were taken from the social centre 'La Madreña', in Oviedo. One of the key figures in this centre was the future candidate for regional President Emilio León. The future regional deputy, Daniel Ripa, also participated in the organisation.

After the official launch, the focus shifted to the organisation of the political campaign for the 2014 European elections. In Podemos' list for the election there were two important Asturias' personalities, Tania González (number six) and above-mentioned Daniel Ripa (number eleven). After the spectacular results of the formation in the European elections, winning five seats, and in which in the case of Asturias, it managed to be the 3rd most voted party, ahead of United Left. Avilesian Tania González was elected as MEP after the resignation of one of the candidates ahead of her on the list. After the election González claimed that "this is just the beginning" and about the result in Asturias, in an interview in La Nueva España, she claimed that in the region "citizens are especially dissatisfied with the corruption scandals and the way of doing politics of the traditional parties [PP and PSOE].".

After the good results in the European elections, the number of militants increased considerably, reaching more than 4,000 supporters in Asturias in August 2014, which would be 8,000 in mid-November, making Asturias the region with the most members per capita.

=== 2015 regional elections ===
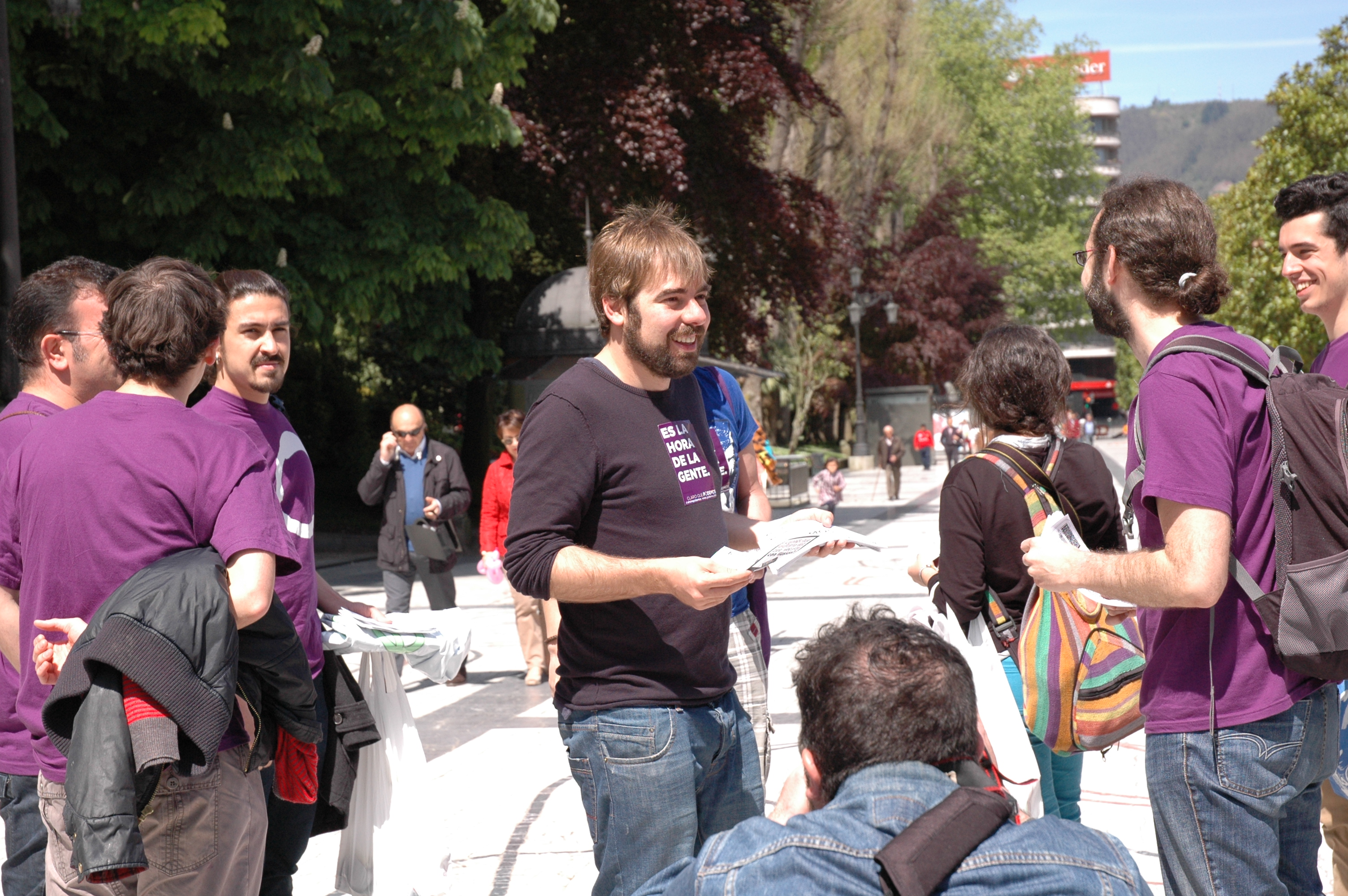
Daniel Ripa distributes electoral pamphlets in 2014 accompanied by Emilio León (on the right, with his back to the camera)

The next elections in Asturias would be the local and regional elections of 2015, for which the party was beginning to prepare. In the local elections, the party renounced to present itself and opted for the 'circles' of each municipality, thirty as of August 2014, to form their own candidacies, which in the Asturian case would bear the name of Somos ('We are') + 'name of the municipality'. At the regional level, the party's leadership was formally established in February 2015 after the holding of primary elections in which Daniel Ripa emerged after obtaining 68% of the support. The other candidacy was led by María José González. Turnout in these primaries was one of the highest in Spain, with more than 5,600 voters (48% of the members in Asturias). In the same primaries, the party's first leadership team was also elected.

In March 2015, just two months before the elections, Podemos introduced his candidate for the presidency, Emilio León. The whole list was chosen by the party via primary, in which León won 86% of the votes. A few days after the decision, information emerged about the participation of León in lists of Asturian nationalist parties, however he denied supporting those ideas and claimed he just did it so that friends of his could run a candidacy.

==== Results and aftermath ====
In the regional elections of that year Podemos managed to position itself as the third force in the regional parliament, after obtaining 9 seats, two less than the PP, in second position. The most voted party was the PSOE, but without achieving an absolute majority. The PSOE quickly ruled out a coalition with any party, and Podemos made the renunciation of some privileges a condition for reaching agreements.

Due to the difficulties in reaching an agreement with the PSOE and the refusal to support the People's Party, León decided to run a candidacy at the investiture session, in which he only received the support of the deputies of his party, given the refusal of the United Left to support him. He was eliminated in the first round and the party refused to support any other candidate in the following rounds. Finally, Javier Fernández (PSOE) was re-elected president with the support of United Left.

=== 2019 regional elections ===
At the end of July 2018, Emilio León announced his resignation as parliamentary spokesman for Podemos Asturies. From some media, this decision was linked to internal discrepancies with the general secretary of the party, Daniel Ripa. Leon denied it and said it was merely for "personal reasons." He later decided not to run again in the 2019 regional election, meaning that a primary took place to choose the list that Lorena Gil won with 78% of the votes after being supported by the regional leadership of Podemos.

On that election, Podemos lost five seats but decided to try to reach an agreement with PSOE. However, Adrián Barbón, the leader of PSOE, reached an agreement with United Left, so that support was no necessary.

Lorena Gil was made spokesperson of the party for the 11th General Junta, however she resigned in November 2020 and her resignation letter said that "There are more and more obstacles to guarantee political work that lives up to the principles".

=== 2021–22 leadership crisis ===
On the run up of the 2023 regional elections Podemos Asturies celebrated a primary election to choose its secretary general. Incumbent Daniel Ripa faced Congress of the Deputies member Sofía Castañón, who also had the support of the national leadership of the party. Castañón won over Ripa for just a hundred votes, but he denounced irregularities in the celebration of primaries. A few days before the vote, the national leadership of Podemos intervened in the party's accounts at the regional level after detecting irregularities, denounced by Castañón's team, in donations to associations allegedly close to Daniel Ripa.

In August 2022, Ripa was sanctioned and later expelled from taking organic duties in the party due to alleged irregularities during his time as secretary general. In February 2023, he was expelled from Podemos.

=== 2023 regional elections ===
In November 2022, Podemos run a primary election to elect their leader for the coming 2023 regional elections. Covadonga Tomé, who was supported by former leader Daniel Ripa, won over Alba González, even though she had the support of the recently renewed leadership in Asturias. Those primaries took place at the same place in other regions, however Asturias was the only one in which the turnout increased when compared with 2019.

In April 2023, just a month before the regional elections, tensions arose in the party regarding the composition of the list. The list, that was voted in a primary election, featured Jorge Fernández as number four. However, he was suspended from the party for "serious and continuous verbal attacks for months on multiple party comrades". Fernández denied it all and said that it was a witch hunt. To prevent his expulsion from the list, Tomé and others locked themselves in the party's headquarters in Gijón for six days, but were unsuccessful as Fernández was finally replaced by Oviedo councillor Ana Taboada in the list.

After the election, Podemos lost all but one seat in the General Junta, its worst result to date. In the local elections they lost all their seats in Oviedo and Langreo, with widespread losses across the region. Members of the party renewed their calls for the regional leadership to resign.

== Electoral performance ==
=== General Junta of the Principality of Asturias ===
Date	Votes			Seats		Status	Size
Date	#	%	±pp	#	±	Status	Size
2015	103,571	19.1%	+19.1	9 / 45	9	Opposition	3rd
2019	57,893	11.0%	-8.1	4 / 45	5	Opposition	4th

=== Cortes Generales ===
Congress of Deputies
Date	Votes			Seats		Size
Date	#	%	±pp	#	±	Size
2015	132,984	21.3%	+21.3	2 / 8	2	3rd
2016	141,845	23.9%	N/A	2 / 8	0	*
2019 (Apr)	106,630	17.2%	N/A	1 / 7	1	*
2019 (Nov)	88,393	16.0%	N/A	1 / 7	0	*

Senate
Date	Seats		Size
Date	#	±	Size
2015	0 / 4	0	3rd
2016	0 / 4	0	*
2019 (Apr)	0 / 4	0	*
2019 (Nov)	0 / 4	0	*

- * Within Unidos Podemos.

=== European Parliament ===
Date	Votes			Size
Date	#	%	±pp	Size
2014	51,778	13.6%	+13.6	3rd
2019	76,949	14.7%	N/A	*

- *Within Unidas Podemos Cambiar Europa
