= Adrián Barbón =

Spanish politician

The Most Excellent Adrián Barbón
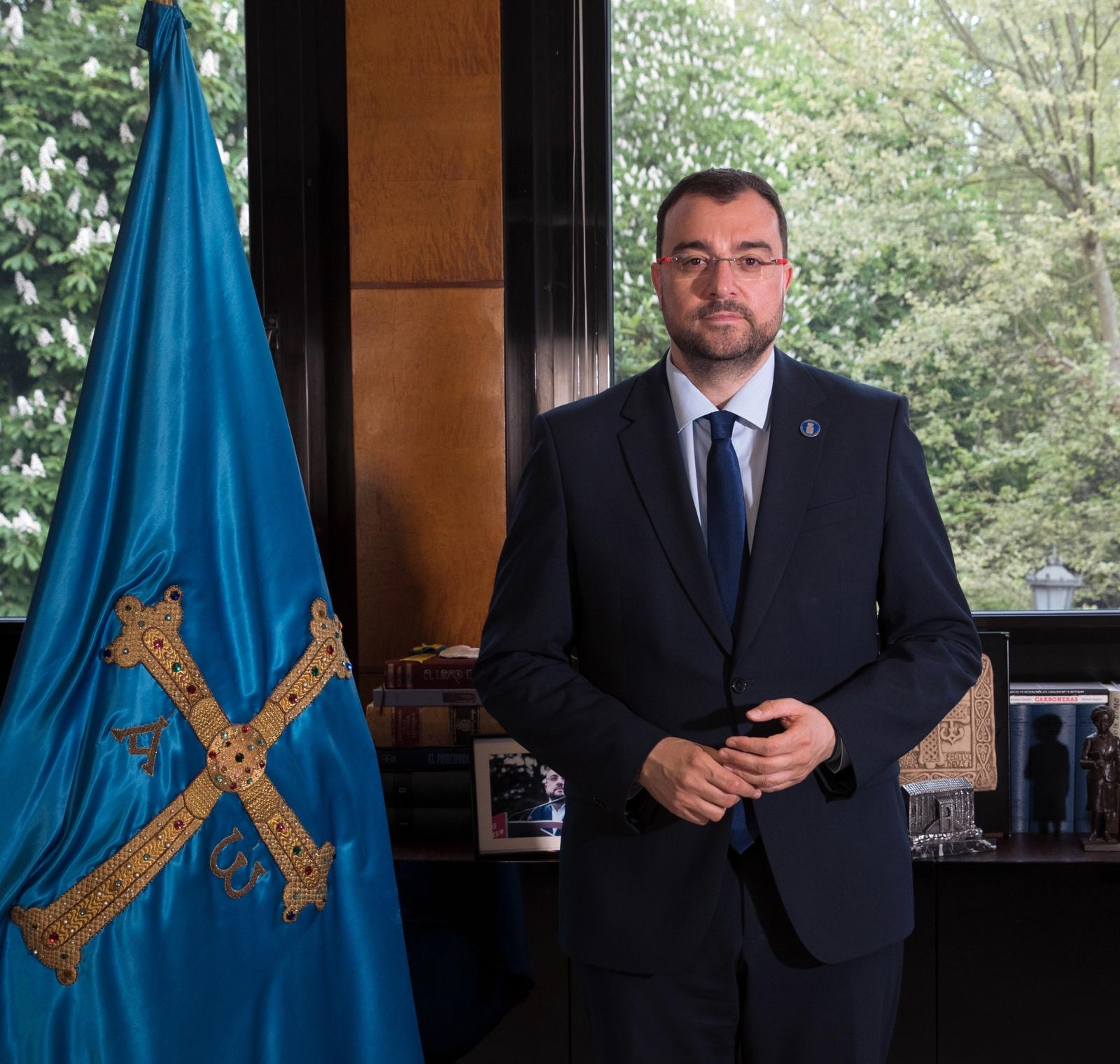

9th President of the Principality of Asturias
- Incumbent
- Assumed office 16 July 2019
- Monarch: Felipe VI
- Vice President: Juan Cofiño; Gimena Llamedo
- Preceded by: Javier Fernández

Secretary-General of the Asturian Socialist Federation
- Incumbent
- Assumed office 17 September 2019
- Preceded by: Javier Fernández

Member of the Congress of Deputies
- In office 29 September 2015 – 27 October 2015
- Constituency: Asturias

Mayor of Laviana
- In office 30 September 2008 – 9 October 2017

Member of the General Junta of the Principality of Asturias
- Incumbent
- Assumed office 24 June 2019
- Constituency: Central District

Personal details
- Born: 4 January 1979 (age 47) Laviana, Asturias, Spain
- Party: PSOE
- Education: University of Oviedo

Adrián Barbón Rodríguez (born 4 January 1979) is a Spanish politician. He is the secretary general of the Asturian Socialist Federation, the regional socialist party affiliated with the national Spanish Socialist Workers' Party (PSOE) and the current President of the Principality of Asturias.

== Personal life ==
Adrián Barbón was born 4 January 1979, in the municipality of Laviana, in the heart of mining region of Asturias. He received his primary education in San José School, located in the neighbouring town of Sotrondio, that closed in 2019 as a consequence of the decline in population in the region. He finished secondary education in IES David Vázquez Martínez, in his hometown of Pola de Laviana. Adrián Barbón graduated in law from the University of Oviedo.

== Political career ==
After serving as mayor of Laviana since 2008 to 2017, Barbón assumed the general secretariat of the Asturian Socialist Federation on 17 September 2017. Two years later, after winning the 2019 Asturian regional election, he was named President of the Principality of Asturias.

On 17 December 2021, he was diagnosed with COVID-19, being hospitalized and with his vice-president Juan Cofiño replacing him as interim President.

On 10 January 2026, with his visit to Pope Leo XIV, he became the first president of Asturias to meet a Pope at the Vatican City.

Political offices
Preceded by Marciano Barreñada Bazán	Mayor of Laviana; 2008–2017	Succeeded by Julio García Rodríguez
Preceded by Javier Fernández	President of the Principality of Asturias; 2019–present	Incumbent
Party political offices
Preceded by Javier Fernández	Secretary-General of the Asturian Socialist Federation; 2017–present	Incumbent
