= Trevín government =

- Council of Government of Asturias

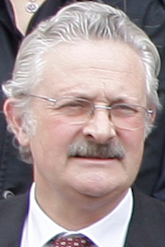
- Date formed: 24 June 1993
- Date dissolved: 17 July 1995

People and organisations
- Head of government: Antonio Trevín
- No. of ministers: 8
- Member party: Asturian Socialist Federation
- Status in legislature: Minority government
- Opposition party: People's Party of Asturias
- Opposition leader: Isidro Fernández Rozada

History
- Legislature term: 3rd General Junta (1991–1995)
- Predecessor: Rodríguez-Vigil
- Successor: Marqués

The Trevín government was the regional government of Asturias led by President Antonio Trevín. It was formed in June 1995 after the resignation of Juan Luis Rodríguez-Vigil due to the Petromocho scandal.

== Investiture ==
Investiture; Antonio Trevín (PSOE)
Ballot →	16 June 1993
Required majority →	23 of 45
Yes: • PSOE (21); • IU (6)	27 / 45
No: • PP (15); • CDS (2); • PAS–UNA (1)	18 / 45
Abstentions	0 / 45

== Composition ==
← Trevín government → (24 June 1993 – 17 July 1995)
Office	Name	Term of office	^{Ref.}
President	Antonio Trevín	18 June 1993 – 14 July 1995	
Minister of the Interior and Public Administrations	María Antonia Fernández Felgueroso	24 June 1993 – 17 July 1995	
Minister of Finance, Economy and Planning	Avelino Viejo	24 June 1993 – 17 July 1995	
Minister of Education, Culture, Sports and Youth	Amelia Valcárcel	24 June 1993 – 17 July 1995	
Minister of Health and Social Services	José García González (es)	24 June 1993 – 17 July 1995	
Minister of Infrastructures and Housing	Juan Manuel Cofiño	24 June 1993 – 17 July 1995	
Minister of Rural Affairs and Fisheries	Santiago Alonso	24 June 1993 – 17 July 1995	
Minister of Industry, Tourism and Employment	Julián Bonet	24 June 1993 – 17 July 1995	
Minister of the Environment and Urban Development	María Luisa Carcedo	24 June 1993 – 17 July 1995	
