= Rafael Fernández government =

- Council of Government of Asturias
- Date formed: 24 May 1982
- Date dissolved: 21 June 1983

People and organisations
- Head of government: Rafael Fernández
- No. of ministers: 10
- Member party: Asturian Socialist Federation

History
- Legislature terms: Provisional General Junta (1982–1983)
- Successor: De Silva I

The Rafael Fernández government was the first regional government of Asturias led by President Rafael Fernández.

== Investiture ==
Investiture; Emilio García-Pumarino (UCD)
Ballot →	15 April 1982
Required majority →	30 of 58
Yes: • UCD (22)	22 / 58
No: • PSOE; • PCA–PCE	31 / 58
Abstentions: • AP; • Mixed group	4 / 58
Absentees: • UCD (1)	1 / 58

Investiture; Rafael Fernández (PSOE)
Ballot →	15 April 1982
Required majority →	30 of 58
Yes: • PSOE; • PCA–PCE	31 / 58
No: • UCD (22); • AP; • Mixed group	26 / 58
Abstention	0 / 58
Absentees: • UCD (1)	1 / 58

== Composition ==
Rafael Fernández government → (24 May 1982 – 21 June 1983)
Office	Name	Term of office	^{Ref.}
President	Rafael Fernández	26 April 1982 – 18 June 1983	
Minister of Presidency	Bernardo Fernández (es)	24 May 1982 – 21 June 1983	
Minister of Finance and Economy	Faustino Alcalde	24 May 1982 – 21 June 1983	
Minister of Territorial Administration	Juan Ramón Zapico	24 May 1982 – 30 May 1983	
Minister of Territorial Policy and Housing	Arturo Gutiérrez de Terán	24 May 1982 – 21 June 1983	
Minister of Education and Culture	Antonio Masip	24 May 1982 – 21 April 1983	
Minister of Health and Social Security	Juan Luis Rodríguez-Vigil	24 May 1982 – 21 June 1983	
Minister of Public Works, Transports and Communications	Víctor Manuel Zapico	24 May 1982 – 21 June 1983	
Minister of Agriculture and Livestock	Jesús Arango	24 May 1982 – 21 June 1983	
Minister of Labour Relations and Social Assistance	Emilio Barbón	24 May 1982 – 21 June 1983	
Minister of Industry, Commerce and Tourism	Manuel Fernández	24 May 1982 – 21 June 1983	
