= De Silva government =

Pedro de Silva formed the first cabinet in 1983 after becoming the first President of the Principality of Asturias elected democratically. He was nominated again in 1987.

== First De Silva government (1983–1987) ==
De Silva government
- Council of Government of Asturias

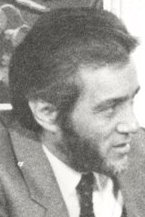
- Date formed: 21 June 1983
- Date dissolved: 28 July 1987

People and organisations
- Head of government: Pedro de Silva
- No. of ministers: 10
- Member party: Asturian Socialist Federation
- Status in legislature: Majority government
- Opposition party: People's Coalition
- Opposition leader: Francisco Álvarez-Cascos

History
- Election: 1983 regional election
- Legislature term: 1st General Junta (1983–1987)
- Predecessor: Rafael Fernández
- Successor: De Silva II

The De Silvafirst government was the regional government of Asturias led by President Pedro de Silva, the first democratically elected one.

=== Investiture ===
Investiture; Pedro de Silva (PSOE)
| Ballot → | 15 June 1983 |
| Required majority → | 23 of 45 |
| Yes: • PSOE (26) | 26 / 45 |
| No: • AP–PDP–UL (14) | 14 / 45 |
| Abstentions: • PCA–PCE (5) | 5 / 45 |

=== Composition ===
← I De Silva government → (18 June 1983 – 27 July 1987)
| Office | Name | Term of office | ^{Ref.} |
| President | Pedro de Silva | 10 July 1991 – 18 June 1993 | |
| Minister of Presidency | Bernardo Fernández (es) | 21 June 1983 – 28 July 1987 | |
| Minister of Finance and Economy | Eduardo Arrojo | 21 June 1983 – 19 September 1986 | |
| Minister of Territorial Administration | Faustino González | 21 June 1983 – 28 July 1987 | |
| Minister of Territorial Policy, Housing and the Environment | Arturo Gutiérrez de Terán | 21 June 1983 – 28 July 1987 | |
| Minister of Education and Culture | Manuel Fernández (es) | 21 June 1983 – 28 July 1987 | |
| Minister of Health and Social Security | Juan Luis Rodríguez-Vigil | 21 June 1983 – 28 July 1987 | |
| Minister of Public Works, Transports and Communications | Pedro Piñera | 21 June 1983 – 28 July 1987 | |
| Minister of Agriculture and Livestock | Jesús Arango | 21 June 1983 – 28 July 1987 | |
| Minister of the Industry, Commerce and Tourism | Jesús Fernández | 21 June 1983 – 29 June 1984 | |
| Minister of Work and Social Action | Fernando Méndez de Andés | 21 June 1983 – 29 June 1984 | |

== Second De Silva government (1987–1991) ==
De Silva government
- Council of Government of Asturias

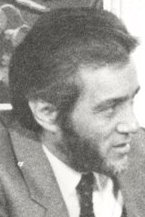
- Date formed: 28 July 1987
- Date dissolved: 11 July 1991

People and organisations
- Head of government: Pedro de Silva
- No. of ministers: 8
- Member party: Asturian Socialist Federation
- Status in legislature: Minority government
- Opposition party: People's Alliance
- Opposition leader: Isidro Fernández Rozada

History
- Election: 1987 regional election
- Legislature term: 2nd General Junta (1987–1991)
- Predecessor: De Silva I
- Successor: Rodríguez-Vigil

The De Silva government second was the regional government of Asturias led by President Pedro de Silva between 1987 and 1991.

=== Investiture ===
Investiture; Pedro de Silva (PSOE)
| Ballot → | 22 June 1987 | 24 June 1987 |
| Required majority → | 23 of 45 | Simple |
| Yes: • PSOE (20) | 20 / 45 | 20 / 45 |
| No | 0 / 45 | 0 / 45 |
| Abstentions: • AP (13); • CDS (8); • IU (6) | 25 / 45 | 25 / 45 |

=== Composition ===
← II De Silva government → (28 July 1987 – 11 July 1991)
| Office | Name | Term of office | ^{Ref.} |
| President | Pedro de Silva | 27 July 1987 – 10 July 1991 | |
| Minister of Presidency | Bernardo Fernández | 28 July 1987 – 11 July 1991 | |
| Minister of Finance, Economy and Planning | Eduardo Arrojo | 28 July 1987 – 11 July 1991 | |
| Minister of the Interior and Territorial Administration | Emilio Ballesteros | 28 July 1987 – 8 May 1991 | |
| Minister of Territorial Policy, Urbanism and Housing | Emilio Murcia | 28 July 1987 – 9 January 1990 | |
| Minister of Education, Culture and Sports | Manuel Fernández (es) | 28 July 1987 – 9 January 1990 | |
| Minister of Health and Social Security | Juan Luis Rodríguez-Vigil | 28 July 1987 – 8 May 1991 | |
| Minister of Public Works, Transports and Communications | Juan Ramón Zapico | 28 July 1987 – 11 July 1991 | |
| Minister of Agriculture and Fisheries | Jesús Cadavieco | 28 July 1987 – 11 July 1991 | |
| Minister of the Industry, Commerce and Tourism | Paz Fernández Felgueroso (es) | 28 July 1987 – 11 July 1991 | |
| Minister of the Youth | Pilar Alonso | 28 July 1987 – 11 July 1991 | |
==== Changes January 1991 ====
| Minister of Territorial Policy, Urbanism and Housing | Felipe Fernández | 9 January 1990 – 11 July 1991 | |
| Minister of Education, Culture and Sports | Jorge Fernández (es) | 9 January 1990 – 11 July 1991 | |
==== Changes May 1991 ====
| Minister of the Interior and Territorial Administration | Juan Ramón Zapico | 8 May 1991 – 11 July 1991 | |
| Minister of Health and Social Security | Felipe Fernández | 8 May 1991 – 11 July 1991 | |
