= Rodríguez-Vigil government =

- Council of Government of Asturias
- Date formed: 11 July 1991
- Date dissolved: 23 June 1993

People and organisations
- Head of government: Juan Luis Rodríguez-Vigil
- No. of ministers: 8
- Member party: Asturian Socialist Federation
- Status in legislature: Minority government
- Opposition party: People's Party of Asturias
- Opposition leader: Isidro Fernández Rozada

History
- Election: 1991 regional election
- Legislature term: 3rd General Junta (1991–1995)
- Predecessor: De Silva II
- Successor: Trevín

The Rodríguez-Vigil government was the regional government of Asturias led by President Juan Luis Rodríguez-Vigil. It was formed in July 1991 and ceased in June 1993 after the resignation of Rodríguez-Vigil due to the scandal of the Petromocho.

== Investiture ==
Investiture; Juan Luis Rodríguez-Vigil (PSOE)
Ballot →	9 June 1991
Required majority →	23 of 45
Yes: • PSOE (21); • IU (6)	27 / 45
No: • PP (15); • CDS (2); • PAS–UNA (1)	18 / 45
Abstentions	0 / 45

== Composition ==
← Rodríguez-Vigil government → (10 July 1991 – 18 June 1993)
Office	Name	Term of office	^{Ref.}
President	Juan Luis Rodríguez-Vigil	10 July 1991 – 18 June 1993	
Vice President	Bernardo Fernández (es)	11 July 1991 – 23 June 1993	
Minister of the Interior and Public Administrations	Bernardo Fernández (es)	11 July 1991 – 23 June 1993	
Minister of Finance, Economy and Planning	Avelino Viejo	11 July 1991 – 23 June 1993	
Minister of Education, Culture, Sports and Youth	María Antonia Fernández Felgueroso	11 July 1991 – 23 June 1993	
Minister of Health and Social Services	José García González (es)	11 July 1991 – 23 June 1993	
Minister of Infrastructures and Housing	Juan Ramón Zapico	11 July 1991 – 23 June 1993	
Minister of Rural Affairs and Fisheries	Felipe Fernández	11 July 1991 – 23 June 1993	
Minister of Industry, Tourism and Employment	Víctor Manuel Zapico	11 July 1991 – 23 June 1993	
Minister of the Environment and Urban Development	María Luisa Carcedo	11 July 1991 – 23 June 1993	
