= Marqués government =

- Council of Government of Asturias

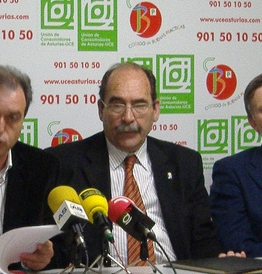
- Date formed: 17 July 1995
- Date dissolved: 22 July 1999

People and organisations
- Head of government: Sergio Marqués
- No. of ministers: 7
- Member party: People's Party (1995–1998); Asturian Renewal Union (1998–1999)
- Status in legislature: Minority government
- Opposition party: Asturian Socialist Federation
- Opposition leader: Antonio Trevín

History
- Election: 1995 regional election
- Legislature term: 4th General Junta (1995–1999)
- Predecessor: Trevín
- Successor: Areces I

The Marqués government was the regional government of Asturias led by President Sergio Marqués. It was formed in July 1995 after the regional election, becoming the first time that the Asturian Socialist Federation did not take the helm of the Council of Government.

In 1998, after several differences with members of the People's Party of Asturias, Marqués left the party and created his own one: the Asturian Renewal Union and remained in the government until 1999, despite a motion of no confidence.

== Investiture ==
Investiture; Sergio Marqués (PP)
Ballot →	6 July 1995	8 July 1995
Required majority →	23 of 45	Simple
Yes: • PP (21)	21 / 45	21 / 45
No: • PSOE (17); • IU (6) (on 6 Jul); • PAS (1) (on 6 Jul)	24 / 45	17 / 45
Abstentions: • IU (6) (on 8 Jul); • PAS (1) (on 8 Jul)	0 / 45	7 / 45

== Composition ==
← Marqués government → (17 July 1995 – 20 July 1999)
Office	Name	Term of office	^{Ref.}
President	Sergio Marqués	14 July 1995 – 20 July 1999	
Vice President	José Ramón García Cañal (es)	17 July 1995 – 16 June 1998	
Minister of Cooperation	José Ramón García Cañal (es)	17 July 1995 – 16 June 1998	
Minister of Economy	Juan Alsina (es)	17 July 1995 – 17 July 1996	
Minister of Culture	María Victoria Rodríguez	17 July 1995 – 22 July 1999	
Minister of Social Services	Antonio Cueto	17 July 1995 – 22 July 1999	
Minister of Development	Juan José Tielve	17 July 1995 – 22 July 1999	
Minister of Agriculture	Luis Peláez	17 July 1995 – 16 June 1998	
=== Changes July 1996 ===
Minister of Economy	José Antonio González	17 July 1996 – 22 July 1999	
=== Changes June 1998 ===
Vice President	Leonardo Verdín (es)	16 June 1998 – 22 July 1999	
Minister of Cooperation	Leonardo Verdín (es)	16 June 1998 – 22 July 1999	
Minister of Agriculture	Manuel Fernández	16 June 1998 – 22 July 1999	
