= UHP =

UHP may refer to:

- UHP (lamp), a mercury-arc lamp used in projectors
- Universal Hall Pass, a pop rock band
- Université Henri Poincaré or Henri Poincaré University, a French research university
- Utah Highway Patrol, a police agency in Utah
- Uníos Hermanos Proletarios or United Brothers of the Proletariat Republican organisation in the Spanish Civil War
- Urea hydrogen peroxide, a reagent in organic synthesis, and also a disinfectant and bleaching agent.
- Ultra high pressure, a mercury lamp invented by Philips for video projectors.
- Uhp, the symbol for the chemical element Unhexpentium
- University Hospitals Plymouth NHS Trust, a hospital group in England.
