= Uníos Hermanos Proletarios =

Labor alliance

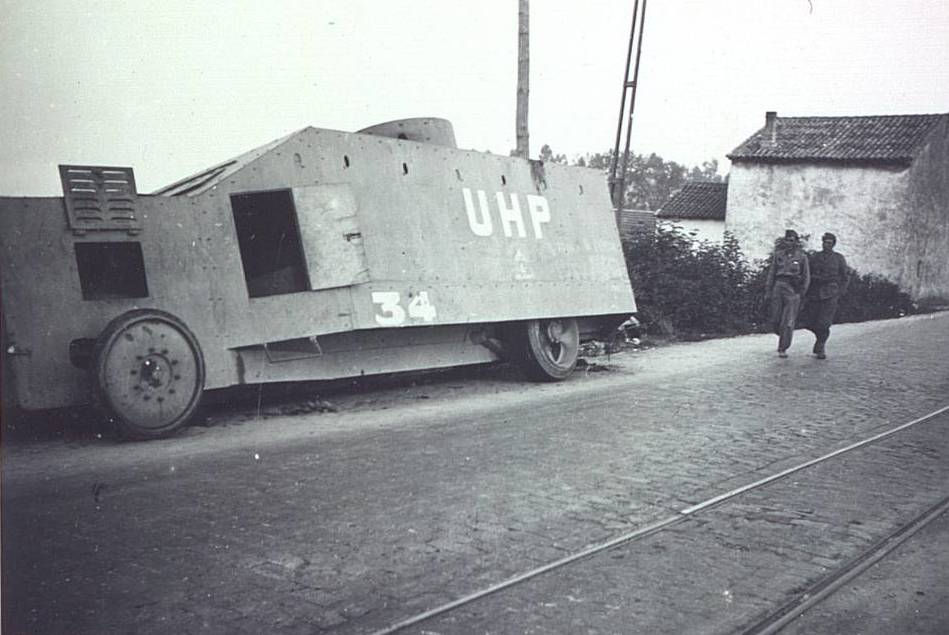
A Republican tank from the Civil War with the initials "UHP"

"Unite Proletarian Brothers" (Spanish: "Uníos Hermanos Proletarios", UHP) is a slogan symbolized in the labor alliance signed by the Asturian Socialist Federation, the Unión General de Trabajadores (UGT) and the Regional Labor Confederations of Asturias, León and Palencia of the Confederación Nacional del Trabajo (CNT), as well as the Workers and Peasants' Bloc and the Communist Left of Spain in February 1934. There was a document signed on March 28, 1934 between the CNT-UGT of Asturias.

== History ==
Originally the acronym "UHP" arose spontaneously among the bases of the union groups with a different meaning, "Union Horse Power", since the different machinery with which they worked at the time was almost all of English manufacture, of which the technical identification plates that dated their capacities and their legend highlighted the horsepower they possessed. From there, the slogan "Uníos Hermanos Proletarios" arose, devised by Amador Fernández.

Under the acronym UHP, the Asturian Socialist Federation, the Unión General de Trabajadores (UGT) and the Regional Labor Confederations of Asturias, León and Palencia of the Confederación Nacional del Trabajo (CNT), as well as the Workers and Peasants' Bloc and the Communist Left of Spain. In September, the Communist Party of Spain applied for membership. However, this was not allowed until it withdrew from its request everything related to anti-Trotskyism, since both the socialists and anarchists understood that unity of action was essential and that there would be no internal confrontations.

The slogan was adopted by the revolutionaries in the Asturias Revolution in October 1934, seeking to represent the unity of action of the Asturian proletariat and its various tendencies. In the newspaper El Siglo Futuro appeared this review: "They greet each other with the salute of a closed fist, and instead of the word "stop" to arrest the suspects, at the forefront they use the password "PHU", which is answered with "UHP". It seems that these initials correspond to the words Unión Proletaria Hispana".

Later it was a regular proclamation of the Republican faction and its defenders in the Spanish Civil War. The UHP locker was also used as a "form of payment" for the militiamen who made their purchases in small shops, leaving the corresponding debt.

== Post ==
The UHP published a newspaper in Guadalajara called UHP, Milicias Alcarreñas Antifascistas. Later it was called UHP Ejército Polular Comandancia de Guadalajara. Its first issue was published on August 12, 1936 and lasted until January 1937. A total of 24 numbers came out, oscillating their price or donation between 10 and 15 cents.

== Other data ==
- In Puerto Real, province of Cádiz, a street bears the name of "Union of Proletarian Brothers".
