= Rafael Fernández Álvarez =

Spanish politician

1st President of the Principality of Asturias
- In office January 11, 1982 – June 17, 1983
- Monarch: Juan Carlos I
- Preceded by: Office created
- Succeeded by: Pedro de Silva

President of the Regional Council of Asturias
- In office September 27, 1978 – January 11, 1982
- Monarch: Juan Carlos I
- Preceded by: Office created
- Succeeded by: Office abolished

Senator of the Senate of Spain
- In office June 15, 1977 – January 18, 2000

Personal details
- Born: 17 September 1913 Oviedo, Asturias, Spain
- Died: 18 December 2010 (aged 97) Oviedo, Asturias, Spain
- Party: Spanish Socialist Workers' Party (PSOE)

Rafael Luis Fernández Álvarez (September 17, 1913 – December 18, 2010) was a Spanish politician and former political exile. Fernández served as the President of the Regional Council of Asturias from 1978 until 1981 before becoming the first President of the Principality of Asturias from 1981 until May 1983. He was a member of the regional Federación Socialista Asturiana (FSA-PSOE) and the larger Spanish Socialist Workers' Party (PSOE).

Rafael Luis Fernández Álvarez was born into a poor family on September 17, 1913, in Oviedo, the capital of Asturias, Spain. His father, Carlos, was employed at the Fábrica de Armas, an arms factory in Oviedo. His mother, Dolores, operated a catering business in Oviedo. Fernández Álvarez enrolled at the University of Oviedo, but did not complete his law degree at the university. He received a scholarship to study at a university in Belgium, which he attended from 1933 until 1934.

Fernandez became politically active early in life and joined the Socialist Youth of Spain at the age of 17. He became the organization's Secretary General in 1932. Fernández then served as a member of the Socialist Provincial Committee of the Popular Front (Comité Provincial del Frente Popular) in Asturias during the Spanish Civil War. Fernandez, a supporter of the Republicans, fled into exile following the victory of the Nationalists and the establishment of Francoist Spain in 1939 under General Francisco Franco. He spent time in Paris and Rhode Island before landing in the Mexican port city of Veracruz. He worked a series of menial jobs upon arrival in Mexico City, starting as a dishwasher at the Cantábrico restaurant.

Fernández returned to Asturias from exile in 1976 following the death of Franco the previous year. He played a pivotal role in the transition to democracy in Asturias, as well as cemented the power of the Spanish Socialists in Asturias following the end of Franco's rule. In 1978, Fernandez began serving as the President of the Regional Council of Asturias. He served in that position until Asturias became an Autonomous communities of Spain (Statute of Autonomy) on December 30, 1981. Fernandez became the first President of the Principality of Asturias following the adoption of Asturian autonomy, an office he held until 1983 when he was succeeded by Pedro de Silva.

Fernández also served as a PSOE Senator in the Spanish Senate, the upper house of the Cortes Generales, from 1977 until he left office in 2000. He also served as the first secretary general and chairman of the Federación Socialista Asturiana (FSA-PSOE) from 1994 until his death in 2010.

Rafael Luis Fernández Álvarez died in his sleep at his home in Oviedo, Asturias, on December 18, 2010 at the age of 97. He was survived by his second wife, Belén Torrecillas, with whom he had been married to for fourteen years. Fernández's first wife, Purificación Tomás, whom he married in 1937, was an activist and the daughter of socialist politician Belarmino Tomás. The couple had four children during their marriage. Purificación Tomás died on November 10, 1990.

Preceded by New title	President of the Principality of Asturias; 1982–1983	Succeeded by Pedro de Silva
