= Asturian Socialist Federation =

Asturian Socialist Federation Federación Socialista Asturiana
- President: Pablo García Fernández
- Secretary-General: Adrián Barbón
- Founded: 27 January 1901
- Headquarters: C/ Santa Teresa, 20; Oviedo, Asturias
- Membership (2023): 7,145
- Ideology: Social democracy
- Political position: Centre to centre-left
- National affiliation: Spanish Socialist Workers' Party
- General Junta: 19 / 45
- Congress of Deputies: 2 / 7 (Asturian seats)
- Spanish Senate: 1 / 4 (Asturian seats)
- Mayors: 32 / 78
- Local seats: 395 / 922

Website
- www.fsa-psoe.org

The Asturian Socialist Federation (Spanish and Asturian: Federación Socialista Asturiana), often shortened to FSA–PSOE, is the regional section of the Spanish Socialist Workers' Party (PSOE) in the Principality of Asturias. It was formed on 27 January 1901 from the Socialist local groupings of Gijón (formed in 1891), Oviedo (1892), Mieres and Langreo (1897) and others.

Since the Spanish transition to democracy started in 1975 and since the establishment of the Spanish "State of Autonomies" in 1983, the FSA–PSOE has governed Asturias nearly uninterruptedly from 1983 to 1995, from 1999 to 2011 and again since 2012.

== History ==
=== Foundation and early years (1901-1931) ===
After the foundation of the PSOE on 2 May 1879, socialist groups were gradually organised in the main towns and cities of Asturias. Thus, in 1891, the Gijón local group was set up, followed by the Oviedo group in 1892 and those of Mieres and Sama de Langreo in 1897. Between 1899 and 1901, socialism took root in Asturias and finally, on 27 January 1901, the founding Congress of the Asturian Socialist Federation of the Spanish Socialist Workers' Party (FSA-PSOE) was held in Oviedo's Centro Obrero (Workers' Centre). Manuel Vigil Montoto was elected president of the first Provincial Committee.

=== Second Republic and Civil War (1931-1939) ===
In 1934, the FSA-PSOE formed part of the workers' alliance formalised in the Uníos Hermanos Proletarios (UHP, Unite Proletarian Brothers) and agreed with the pact signed between the socialist trade union Unión General de Trabajadores (UGT, General Union of Workers) and the Regional Confederation of Labour of Asturias, León and Palencia of the anarcho-syndicalist organisation CNT. The UHP - which was later joined by other workers' organisations - played a significant role in the 1934 Revolution.

During the Spanish Civil War, the Socialist Belarmino Tomás presided over the Interprovincial Council of Asturias and León, later transformed into the Sovereign Council of Asturias and León.

=== Franco's dictatorship (1939-1975) ===
Like all other left-wing and republican parties, the FSA was outlawed and its members persecuted and sometimes killed. While the UGT, the trade union linked to the party, maintained some activity during the dictatorship, especially during the labour conflicts in the region, the main opposition to the francoist regime was the Communist Party of Asturias (PCA) and its allies in the region.

=== Transition and democracy (since 1975) ===
After Franco's regime and with the advent of democracy, the FSA regained its leading role. Rafael Luis Fernández Álvarez presided over the two governments of the Regional Council of Asturias, the pre-autonomous body that would govern Asturias from 1978 to 1982, as well as the first pre-electoral government of the Principality of Asturias. On Sunday, 14 May 1978, Felipe González and Enrique Tierno Galván gave a rally in the El Molinón football stadium in Gijón attended by 25,000 people.

The FSA-PSOE won the Presidency of the Principality in the first regional election in 1983 with Pedro de Silva Cienfuegos-Jovellanos as leader. In 1991 he was succeeded by Juan Luis Rodríguez-Vigil Rubio, who resigned after the Petromocho scandal and was replaced by Antonio Trevín Lombán in 1993. After a legislature in opposition, in 1999 the FSA, led by Vicente Álvarez Areces, once again gained access to the regional government - thanks in part to the instability generated by regional president Sergio Marqués' break with the PP, founding the Unión Renovadora Asturiana (URAS, Asturias Renewal Union) in 1998. The socialists later won the regional elections in 2003 and 2007.

After six months in 2011 of minority government led by Francisco Álvarez-Cascos, president of Foro Asturias (FAC, Asturian Forum), another PP's split, the FSA regained the presidency of Asturias in 2012 with Javier Fernández Fernández. He was re-elected after the May 2015 elections.

In the PSOE crisis of 2016, a new leadership emerged in the FSA-PSOE that led to the 32nd congress and the election of Adrián Barbón as Secretary General on 1 October 2017. Barbón himself was the head of the list for the regional elections on 26 May 2019, winning six more seats than those won by Javier Fernández in 2015. Adrián Barbón was sworn in as President of the Principality of Asturias on 20 July 2019.

== Electoral performance ==
=== General Junta of the Principality of Asturias ===
General Junta of the Principality of Asturias
Election	Votes	%	#	Seats	+/–	Leading candidate	Status in legislature
1983	293,320	51.96%	1st	26 / 45	—	Pedro de Silva	Government
1987	222,326	38.85%	1st	20 / 45	6	Pedro de Silva	Government
1991	218,193	41.02%	1st	21 / 45	1	Juan Luis Rodríguez-Vigil	Government
1995	219,527	33.83%	2nd	17 / 45	4	Antonio Trevín	Opposition
1999	284,972	46.00%	1st	24 / 45	7	Vicente Álvarez Areces	Government
2003	250,474	40.48%	1st	22 / 45	2	Vicente Álvarez Areces	Coalition
2007	252,201	42.04%	1st	21 / 45	1	Vicente Álvarez Areces	Government (2007–2008)
2007	252,201	42.04%	1st	21 / 45	1	Vicente Álvarez Areces	Coalition (2008–2011)
2011	179,619	29.92%	1st	15 / 45	6	Javier Fernández	Opposition
2012	161,159	32.10%	1st	17 / 45	2	Javier Fernández	Government
2015	143,851	26.48%	1st	14 / 45	3	Javier Fernández	Government
2019	187,462	35.26%	1st	20 / 45	6	Adrián Barbón	Government
2023	195,999	36.50%	1st	19 / 45	1	Adrián Barbón	Government

=== Cortes Generales ===
Cortes Generales
Election	Asturias						
Election	Congress					Senate	
Election	Votes	%	#	Seats	+/–	Seats	+/–
1977	182,850	31.74%	1st	4 / 10	—	1 / 4	—
1979	200,346	37.28%	1st	4 / 10	0	3 / 4	2
1982	339,575	52.13%	1st	6 / 10	2	3 / 4	0
1986	278,946	45.99%	1st	5 / 9	1	3 / 4	0
1989	248,584	40.56%	1st	4 / 9	1	3 / 4	0
1993	271,877	39.32%	1st	4 / 9	0	3 / 4	0
1996	288,558	39.85%	2nd	4 / 9	0	1 / 4	2
2000	241,830	37.02%	2nd	3 / 9	1	1 / 4	0
2004	305,240	43.38%	2nd	4 / 8	1	1 / 4	0
2008	326,477	46.93%	1st	4 / 8	0	3 / 4	2
2011	185,526	29.34%	2nd	3 / 8	1	1 / 4	2
2015	145,113	23.29%	2nd	2 / 8	1	1 / 4	0
2016	147,920	24.87%	2nd	2 / 8	0	1 / 4	0
2019 (Apr)	207,586	33.13%	1st	3 / 7	1	3 / 4	2
2019 (Nov)	186,211	33.27%	1st	3 / 7	0	3 / 4	0
2023	205,049	34.34%	2nd	2 / 7	1	1 / 4	2

=== European Parliament ===
European Parliament
Election	Asturias		
Election	Votes	%	#
1987	244,323	42.43%	1st
1989	197,650	41.48%	1st
1994	173,986	32.07%	2nd
1999	256,497	41.52%	1st
2004	204,889	46.39%	1st
2009	189,783	44.05%	1st
2014	99,000	26.08%	1st
2019	201,642	38.58%	1st
2024	149,818	35.05%	2nd

== See also ==
- Spanish Socialist Workers' Party
