= President of the Principality of Asturias =

- Coat of Arms of the Principality of Asturias

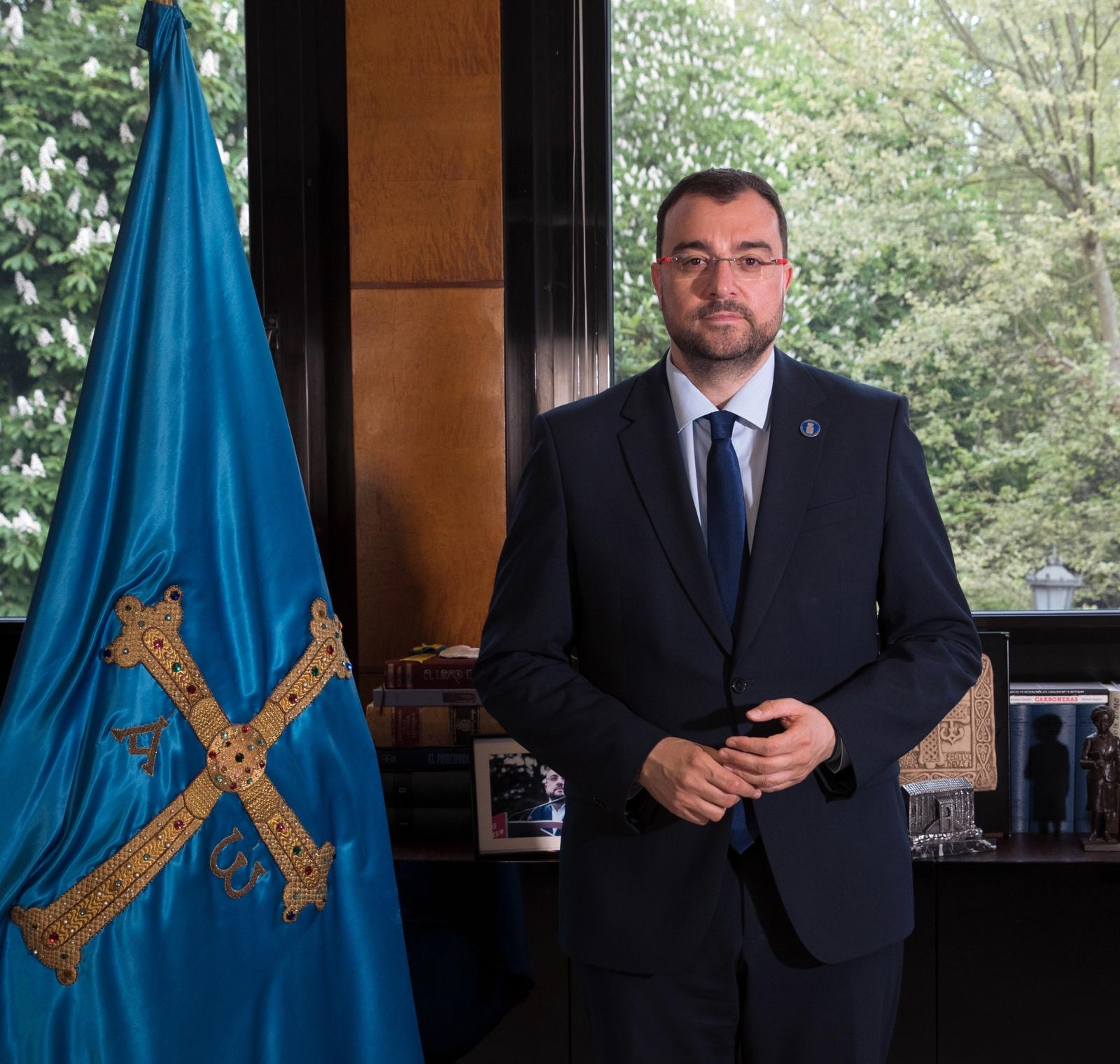
- Incumbent; Adrián Barbón since 16 July 2019
- Nominator: The General Junta
- Appointer: The Monarch countersigned by the Prime Minister
- Term length: No fixed term Regional election to the General Junta are held every 4 years at most. No term limits are imposed on the office.
- Constituting instrument: Statute of Autonomy
- Inaugural holder: Rafael Fernández Álvarez
- Formation: 1978

The President of the Principality of Asturias (Spanish: Presidente del Principado de Asturias; Asturian: Presidente del Principáu d'Asturies) is the head of government of the Spanish autonomous community of Asturias. The president is chosen by the General Junta of the Principality of Asturias, autonomous parliamentary institution.

== Election ==
The president is elected after the constitution of the General Junta or after the cessation of the former president.

A deputy can be nominated as candidate only if at least five members propose him.

During the Investiture proceedings the nominees present their political agenda in an Investiture Speech to be debated and submitted for a Vote of Confidence by the General Junta, effecting an indirect election of the head of government. A simple majority confirms the nominee and his program. At the moment of the vote, the confidence is awarded if the candidate receives a majority of votes in the first poll (currently 23 out of 45 deputies), but if the confidence is not awarded, a second vote is scheduled two days later in which a simple majority of votes cast (i.e., more "yes" than "no" votes) is required.

== Headquarters ==
The headquarters of the President of the Principality of Asturias are located in Oviedo. The building is in the back part of the General Junta of the Principality of Asturias and both buildings are connected by an underground passage.

The building was formerly the seat of the Bank of Spain in Oviedo until 1982

The Principality of Asturias acquired the building 1982 and reformed it for its current use between 1983 and 1985.

== List of officeholders ==
Governments:

- PSOE
- PP
- FAC
- Mixed coalition

Portrait	Name (Birth–Death)	Term of office			Party	Government Composition	Election	Ref.
Portrait	Name (Birth–Death)	Took office	Left office	Duration	Party	Government Composition	Election	Ref.
	Rafael Fernández Álvarez (1913–2010)	10 November 1978	18 June 1979	4 years and 222 days	PSOE	Fernández Álvarez I PSOE–UCD–AP–PCE	N/A	
	Rafael Fernández Álvarez (1913–2010)	18 June 1979	5 May 1982	4 years and 222 days	PSOE	Fernández Álvarez II; PSOE–UCD–AP–PCE	N/A	
	Rafael Fernández Álvarez (1913–2010)	5 May 1982	20 June 1983	4 years and 222 days	PSOE	Fernández Álvarez III; PSOE–PCE	N/A	
	Pedro de Silva (born 1945)	20 June 1983	28 July 1987	8 years and 21 days	PSOE	De Silva I PSOE	1983	
	Pedro de Silva (born 1945)	28 July 1987	11 July 1991	8 years and 21 days	PSOE	De Silva II; PSOE	1987	
	Juan Luis Rodríguez-Vigil (born 1945)	11 July 1991	19 June 1993	1 year and 343 days	PSOE	Rodríguez-Vigil; PSOE	1991	
	Antonio Trevín (1956–2025)	19 June 1993	17 July 1995	2 years and 28 days	PSOE	Trevín; PSOE	1991	
	Sergio Marqués (1946–2012)	17 July 1995	21 July 1999	4 years and 4 days	PP	Marqués; PP until Jun 1998; Ind./URAS from Jun 1998 (Note: Sergio Marqués had been suspended from PP membership in June 1998, then expelled from the party in February 1999 after he founded and joined the new URAS party.)	1995	
	Sergio Marqués (1946–2012)	17 July 1995	21 July 1999	4 years and 4 days	URAS	Marqués; PP until Jun 1998; Ind./URAS from Jun 1998	1995	
	Vicente Álvarez Areces (1943–2019)	21 July 1999	5 July 2003	11 years and 360 days	PSOE	Areces I PSOE	1999	
	Vicente Álvarez Areces (1943–2019)	5 July 2003	12 July 2007	11 years and 360 days	PSOE	Areces II; PSOE–IU–BA	2003	
	Vicente Álvarez Areces (1943–2019)	12 July 2007	16 July 2011	11 years and 360 days	PSOE	Areces III; PSOE until Nov 2008; PSOE–IU–BA from Nov 2008	2007	
	Francisco Álvarez-Cascos (born 1947)	16 July 2011	25 May 2012	314 days	FAC	Cascos; FAC	2011	
	Javier Fernández (born 1948)	25 May 2012	23 July 2015	7 years and 53 days	PSOE	Fernández I PSOE	2012	
	Javier Fernández (born 1948)	23 July 2015	17 July 2019	7 years and 53 days	PSOE	Fernández II; PSOE	2015	
	Adrián Barbón (born 1979)	17 July 2019	20 July 2023	7 years and 52 days	PSOE	Barbón I PSOE	2019	
	Adrián Barbón (born 1979)	20 July 2023	Incumbent	7 years and 52 days	PSOE	Barbón II; PSOE–IU	2023	

== See also ==
- General Junta of the Principality of Asturias
- Government of the Principality of Asturias
