= Pedro de Silva =

Spanish politician, lawyer, and writer

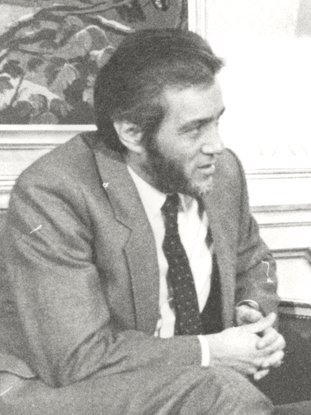

2nd President of the Principality of Asturias
- In office 18 June 1983 – 11 July 1991
- Monarch: Juan Carlos I
- Preceded by: Rafael Fernández Álvarez
- Succeeded by: Juan Luis Rodríguez-Vigil

Personal details
- Born: 18 August 1945 (age 80) Gijón, Asturias, Spain
- Party: Spanish Socialist Workers' Party (PSOE)
- Occupation: Writer, Lawyer
- Profession: Writer, Lawyer, Politician

Pedro de Silva Cienfuegos-Jovellanos (born 18 August 1945 Gijón, Spain) is a Spanish politician, lawyer and writer. He served as the second President of the Principality of Asturias from 17 June 1983, until 10 July 1991.

Pedro de Silva was born 18 August 1945 Gijón, Asturias, Spain. His father, Pedro de Silva Sierra, a lawyer as well, served as the dean of the Escuela de Práctica Jurídica in Gijón from 1975 until 1990. His mother, María Jesús Cienfuegos-Jovellanos Vigil-Escalera, died on 9 August 2004, at the age of 85. De Silva is a direct descendant of Gaspar Melchor de Jovellanos through his mother's lineage.

Preceded by Rafael Fernández	President of the Principality of Asturias; 1983–1991	Succeeded by Juan Luis Rodríguez-Vigil
