= Antonio Trevín =

Spanish politician and teacher (1956–2025)

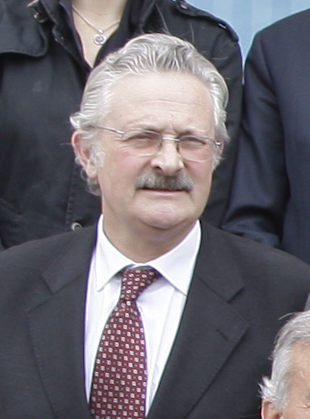
- Trevín in 2010

4th President of the Principality of Asturias
- In office 18 June 1993 – 11 July 1995
- Monarch: Juan Carlos I
- Preceded by: Juan Luis Rodríguez-Vigil
- Succeeded by: Sergio Marqués Fernández

Mayor of Llanes
- In office 30 June 1987 – 22 June 1993

Member of the Congress of Deputies
- In office 13 December 2011 – 31 August 2017
- Constituency: Asturias

Personal details
- Born: 27 February 1956 Avilés, Asturias, Spain
- Died: 23 July 2025 (aged 69) Llanes, Asturias, Spain
- Party: Asturian Socialist Federation (FSA-PSOE)

Antonio Ramón María Trevín Lombán (Spanish: [anˈtonjo raˈmon maˈɾia tɾeˈβin lomˈban]; 27 February 1956 – 23 July 2025) was a Spanish politician and academic. Trevín, a member of the Asturian Socialist Federation (FSA-PSOE), served as the President of the Principality of Asturias from 18 June 1993 to 11 July 1995.

Before being the President of Asturias, Trevín served as mayor of Llanes from 1987 to 1993. Between 2011 and 2017, he has served as a member of the Spanish Congress, representing Asturias.

Trevín died at his home in Llanes on 23 July 2025, at the age of 69. He had announced he was suffering from pancreatic cancer in January of that year.

Preceded by Juan Luis Rodríguez-Vigil	President of the Principality of Asturias; 1993–1995	Succeeded by Sergio Marqués
