= Petromocho =

El Petromocho was a political scandal that took place in the Principality of Asturias, Spain, in 1993. It led to the resignation of the Asturian President, Juan Luis Rodríguez-Vigil. The scandal occurred at a time when there was a need to attract productive investment to Asturias because of a declining industrial structure.

In October 1992, Jean-Maurice Lauze stated he was sent by the Saudi International Bank as a French intermediary to negotiate with the government of Asturias. His proposal was to make an investment of up to 100,000 million pesetas to build an oil refinery near the port of El Musel in Gijón. The negotiations lasted seven months, and the project was to receive a state subsidy of 1,000 million pesetas. The project was announced in May 1993, and was presented as one of the largest industrial investments ever made in Spain. Construction would begin in 1994 and was to be completed in 1998. The refinery, with a production capacity of 180,000 barrels a day, would create up to 4,000 jobs. A week after the announcement, and following an investigation by three of its editors, the newspaper Gijón Trade stated the project was a fraud. The Saudi International Bank confirmed that it had no knowledge of the project. The alleged New York bank that was to underwrite the operation did not exist. The Asturian government discovered that it had been deceived by an imposter. Rodríguez-Vigil and the Minister of Industry, Victor Zapico, each blamed the other. Zapico stated he had not received monetary compensation for the negotiations. A government spokesman suggested that the plan may have been conceived to discredit the Spanish Socialist Workers' Party (PSOE). Rodriguez-Vigil resigned in May 1993, citing reasons of "political dignity".

Though he maintained his innocence, Lauze was convicted in July 1994 of forging official commercial documents. The court held that his certificates were forged in the Saudi Kingdom embassy in Madrid. The documents claimed that Lauze was the head of oil supply contracts with the state-owned Saudi Samareg. The petrochemical complex proposal was said to have been instigated by the Saudi International Bank, a financial organization of Prince Abdullah ibn Faisal ibn Turki Al-Abdullah Al-Saud. The forged documents were attributed to a Swiss notary, Roland Rochat.
