= Juan Luis Rodríguez-Vigil =

Spanish politician

3rd President of the Principality of Asturias
- In office 11 July 1991 – 18 June 1993
- Monarch: Juan Carlos I
- Preceded by: Pedro de Silva
- Succeeded by: Antonio Trevín

Personal details
- Born: 15 March 1945 (age 81) Valdepeñas, Ciudad Real, Spain
- Party: Spanish Socialist Workers' Party (PSOE)

Juan Luis Rodriguez-Vigil Rubio (born 15 March 1945) is a Spanish Socialist Workers' Party (PSOE) politician. He was President of the Principality of Asturias between 1991 and 1993.

== Early years ==
He was born in Valdepeñas, Ciudad Real, Spain, but soon moved to Infiesto (Piloña) where he remained until he was 13, at which time he moved to Oviedo. As a teenager, he contracted pneumonia and was bedridden for an extended period at the family home in Teverga where he spent time reading books in his uncle's 19th-century library. Rodriguez-Vigil studied law at the University of Oviedo, and joined the Popular Liberation Front.

== Career ==
He worked in the Ministry of Industry and the Ministry of Public Works and Transport in Madrid. After requesting a leave of absence, he served as a labor lawyer for the Unión General de Trabajadores in Oviedo. He served as Minister of Health and Social Security from 1982 to 1991.

In 1971, he joined the PSOE. He belonged to several regional executive committees, and was regional executive secretary until 1991. Between 1982 and 1991, he was part of various regional governments. In the regional elections of May 1991, he was elected as a deputy and sworn in President of the Principality of Asturias. On 31 May 1993 he was forced to resign after the Petromocho petrochemical scandal, taking responsibility in the matter. He is a member of the Advisory Council of the Principality of Asturias.

== Personal life ==
Rodriguez-Vigil is married with three children. In 2005, he published the book The neighborhood and community mountains of Asturias. An African art expert, he is also knowledgeable of the architectural heritage of Asturias, as well as romantic adventure literature. On 10 January 2006 he became a fellow of the Royal Institute of Asturian Studies (RIDEA).

== Partial works ==
- Los montes comunales y vecinales de Asturias (2005)
- Integración o desmoronamiento. Crisis y alternativas del sistema nacional de salud español (2008)
- Geografía Sagrada de Asturias (2010)
- La sanidad pública en Asturias (2009, 2010)
- El futuro del medio rural asturiano (2009, 2010, 2011)

Preceded by Pedro de Silva	President of the Principality of Asturias; 1991–1993	Succeeded by Antonio Trevín
