= Council of Government of the Principality of Asturias =

Government body in Spain

Government of the Principality of Asturias
- Gobierno del Principado de Asturias; Gobiernu del Principáu d'Asturies

Overview
- Established: 1982
- Polity: Asturias
- Leader: President
- Appointed by: King of Spain
- Responsible to: General Junta
- Headquarters: Oviedo
- Website: www.asturias.es

The Government of the Principality of Asturias (Asturian: Gobiernu del Principáu d'Asturies), also known as the Council of Government of the Principality of Asturias (Asturian: Conseyu de Gobiernu del Principáu d'Asturies) is the executive branch of the General Junta of Asturias, one of the autonomous communities of Spain. It is responsible for the political action, regulation, and administration of the government of the autonomous region.

It has its headquarters in Oviedo.

== Composition ==
The President of the Principality of Asturias is the head of government, elected by the members of the General Junta. He appoints one vice-president and the counselors. These ones can be members of the General Junta or not.
