= 11th General Junta of the Principality of Asturias =

11th General Junta
←	10th	12th	→
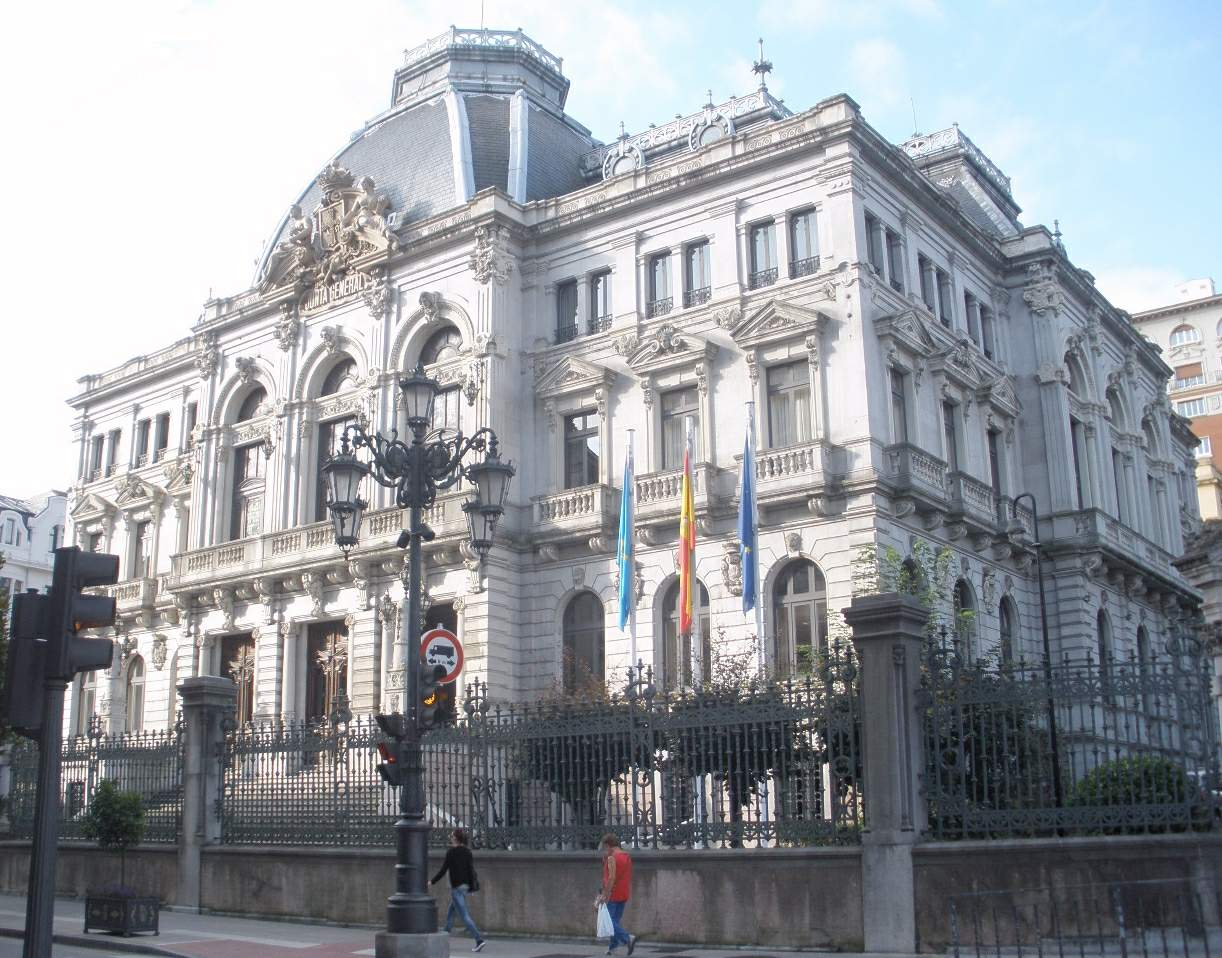

Overview
- Legislative body: General Junta of the Principality of Asturias
- Term: 24 June 2019 – 26 June 2023
- Election: 26 May 2019
- Government: Barbón I
- Website: jgpa.es

Deputies
- Members: 45
- President: Marcelino Marcos (PSOE)
- First Vice-President: Alfonso Rodríguez (PSOE)
- Second Vice-President: Javier Brea (PP)
- First Secretary: Ovidio Zapico (IU/IX)
- Second Secretary: Luis Armando Fernández (Cs)

The 11th General Junta was the meeting of the General Junta, the parliament of the Principality of Asturias, with the membership determined by the results of the regional election held on 26 May 2019. The congress met for the first time on 24 June 2019.

== Election ==
The 11th Asturian regional election was held on 26 May 2019. At the election the Spanish Socialist Workers' Party (PSOE) remained the largest party in the General Junta but fell short of a majority again.

Alliance	Votes	%	Seats	+/–
Spanish Socialist Workers' Party (PSOE)	187,462	35.26%	20	▲6
People's Party (PP)	93,147	17.52%	10	▼1
Citizens–Party of the Citizenry (Cs)	74,271	13.97%	5	▲2
We Can (Podemos)	58,674	11.04%	4	▼5
United Left–Asturian Left: Asturias by the Left (IU–IAS)	35,174	6.62%	2	▼3
Forum of Citizens (FAC)	34,687	6.52%	2	▼1
Vox (Vox)	34,210	6.43%	2	▲2
Others/blanks	14,059	2.64%	0	
Total	531,704	100.00%	45	Steady

== History ==
The new parliament met for the first time on 24 June 2019 and Marcelino Marcos (PSOE) was elected as President of the General Junta with the support of Podemos and United Left.

President
Candidate		Votes
Marcelino Marcos	PSOE	26
Blank		19
Total		45

On 29 July 2019, with the aim of avoiding a very big mixed group, a new proposal for creating groups with only two members was allowed. This reform allowed United Left, Asturias Forum and Vox to have their own parliamentary group.

== Deaths, resignations and suspensions ==
The 11th General Junta has seen the following deaths, resignations and suspensions:

- 29 May 2019 – Carmen Moriyón, leader of Foro Asturias and the number 1 candidate on FAC's list for the Central District, declined to take her seat in the General Junta after her party's poor results in the elections. She was replaced by Pedro Leal (FAC).
- 24 June 2019 - Juan Vazquez, an independent politician and number 1 candidate on Ciudadanos' list for the Central District, resigned a few hours after taking his seat, after political dissagrements with Ciudadanos' new pact policy, among other things. Ana Rosa Fonseca, also an independent politician, was number 6 candidate on Ciudadanos' list, and therefore, she should replace Juan Vazquez as deputy. However, she declined to take her seat for similar reasons than the ones put up by Vazquez. Susana Fernández (Cs) replaced Vazquez on 12 July 2019.
- 30 December 2019 - Ana María Coto (Cs) resigned after voting differently from her colleagues before the regional budget. On 4 January 2021, Cristobal de la Coba, who should replace Coto, announced that he will not be taking his seat. She was replaced by Luis Fanjul Villa on 7 January 2020.
- 19 November 2020 - Lorena Gil (Podemos), spokesperson for Podemos, resigned due to political disagreements with her party, saying that there were "obstacles" that prevented her from doing her political job correctly. Ricardo Menéndez (Independent, Podemos) replaced her on 23 December 2021, after Jara Cosculluela (Podemos), who was up in the list, declined to take her seat.
- 4 January 2022 - Laura Pérez Macho (Cs) resigned after various clashes with the regional leadership of the party. She was replaced by Manuel Cifuentes (Cs) on 26 January 2022.
- 17 December 2022 - Ignacio Blanco (Vox) announced his intention not to lead his party in the 2023 Asturian regional election. He also resigned as deputy. His decision came a few days after 'El Español' reported that Blanco was behind a society that owned a shopping centre in Llobregat (Barcelona) that was about to close down precisely because of the debt generated by that society. Blanco told 'La Nueva España': "My law firm has been dedicated to debt restructuring since 2009, and I am a bankruptcy administrator in many cases". He added that his resignation had nothing to do with the issue, and that it was a personal one in order to return to his job as lawyer. Javier Jové (Vox) replaced him on 14 February 2023.

== Members ==
Name	Constituency	No.	Party	Alliance	Group	Took office	Left office	Notes
Alfonso Albaladejo	Central	9	FSA	PSOE	Socialists	24 June 2019	26 June 2023	
Alba Álvarez	Western	2	FSA	PSOE	Socialists	24 June 2019	26 June 2023	
Pablo Álvarez-Pire	Central	4	PPA	PP	People's	24 June 2019	26 June 2023	
Sara Concepción Álvarez	Central	2	Vox	Vox	Vox	24 June 2019	26 June 2023	
Adrián Barbón	Central	1	FSA	PSOE	Socialists	24 June 2019	26 June 2023	
Ignacio Blanco	Central	1	Vox	Vox	Vox	24 June 2019	17 December 2022	Replaced by Javier Jové
Javier Brea	Eastern	2	PPA	PP	People's	24 June 2019	26 June 2023	
María Dolores Carcedo	Central	4	FSA	PSOE	Socialists	24 June 2019	26 June 2023	
Manuel Cifuentes	Central	10	Cs	Cs	Citizens	26 January 2022	26 June 2023	Replaces Laura Pérez Macho
Juan Cofiño	Central	3	FSA	PSOE	Socialists	24 June 2019	26 June 2023	
Ana María Coto	Central	2	Independent	Cs	Citizens	24 June 2019	30 December 2019	Replaced by Luis Carlos Fanjul
Luis Carlos Fanjul	Central	9	Cs	Cs	Citizens	28 January 2020	26 June 2023	Replaces Ana María Coto
José Manuel Felgueres	Eastern	1	PPA	PP	People's	24 June 2019	26 June 2023	
Susana Fernández	Central	7	Cs	Cs	Citizens	24 June 2019	26 June 2023	Replaces Juan Vázquez
Luis Armando Fernández	Central	5	Cs	Cs	Citizens	24 June 2019	26 June 2023	Expelled from Citizens in May 2022, later joined the Mixed group in July 2022.
Luis Armando Fernández	N/A	N/A	Independent	Independent	Mixed	24 June 2019	26 June 2023	Expelled from Citizens in May 2022, later joined the Mixed group in July 2022.
José Ramón Fernández	Central	13	FSA	PSOE	Socialists	24 June 2019	26 June 2023	
Celia Fernández	Central	2	Independent	PSOE	Socialists	24 June 2019	26 June 2023	
Lidia Fernández	Western	4	FSA	PSOE	Socialists	24 June 2019	26 June 2023	
Luis Ramón Fernández	Central	7	FSA	PSOE	Socialists	24 June 2019	26 June 2023	
Reyes Fernández	Central	2	PPA	PP	People's	24 June 2019	26 June 2023	
Enrique Fernández	Central	5	FSA	PSOE	Socialists	24 June 2019	26 June 2023	
Esther Freile	Eastern	3	FSA	PSOE	Socialists	24 June 2019	26 June 2023	
Gloria García	Central	6	PPA	PP	People's	24 June 2019	26 June 2023	
Sergio García	Central	3	Cs	Cs	Citizens	24 June 2019	26 June 2023	
Lorena Gil	Central	1	Podemos	Podemos	Podemos Asturias	24 June 2019	19 November 2020	Replaced by Ricardo Menéndez
Ana González Cachero	Central	6	FSA	PSOE	Socialists	24 June 2019	26 June 2023	
Pablo González	Central	3	PPA	PP	People's	24 June 2019	26 June 2023	
Javier Jové	Central	3	Vox	Vox	Vox	14 February 2023	26 June 2023	Replaces Ignacio Blanco
Pedro Leal	Central	3	FAC	FAC	Asturias Forum	24 June 2019	26 June 2023	Replaces Carmen Moriyón
Jimena Llamedo	Eastern	1	FSA	PSOE	Socialists	24 June 2019	26 June 2023	
Noelia Macías	Central	10	FSA	PSOE	Socialists	24 June 2019	26 June 2023	
Teresa Mallada	Central	1	PPA	PP	People's	24 June 2019	26 June 2023	
Marcelino Marcos	Western	1	FSA	PSOE	Socialists	24 June 2019	26 June 2023	
Ricardo Menéndez	Central	6	Independent	Podemos	Podemos Asturias	23 December 2020	26 June 2023	Replaces Lorena Gil
Ángel Morales	Eastern	2	FSA	PSOE	Socialists	24 June 2019	26 June 2023	
Carmen Ordieres	Central	12	FSA	PSOE	Socialists	24 June 2019	26 June 2023	
Rafael Palacios	Central	4	Podemos	Podemos	Podemos Asturias	24 June 2019	26 June 2023	
Laura Pérez Macho	Central	4	Cs	Cs	Citizens	24 June 2019	4 January 2022	Replaced by Manuel Cifuentes
Beatriz Polledo	Central	5	PPA	PP	People's	24 June 2019	26 June 2023	
Adrián Pumares	Central	2	FAC	FAC	Asturias Forum	24 June 2019	26 June 2023	
Álvaro Queipo	Western	1	PPA	PP	People's	24 June 2019	26 June 2023	
Daniel Ripa	Central	2	Podemos	Podemos	Podemos Asturias	24 June 2019	26 June 2023	
Nuria Rodríguez	Central	3	Podemos	Podemos	Podemos Asturias	24 June 2019	26 June 2023	
Mónica Ronderos	Central	8	FSA	PSOE	Socialists	24 June 2019	26 June 2023	
René Suárez	Central	11	FSA	PSOE	Socialists	24 June 2019	26 June 2023	
Ricardo Suárez	Western	3	FSA	PSOE	Socialists	24 June 2019	26 June 2023	
Ángela Vallina	Central	1	IU/IX	IU–IAS	United Left	24 June 2019	26 June 2023	
Juan Vázquez	Central	1	Cs	Cs	Citizens	24 June 2019	24 June 2019	Replaced by Susana Fernández
Cristina Vega	Western	2	PPA	PP	People's	24 June 2019	26 June 2023	
Ovidio Zapico	Central	2	IU/IX	IU–IAS	United Left	24 June 2019	26 June 2023	
