= 2019 Asturian regional election =

Election in the Spanish region of Asturias

- 26 May 2019

All 45 seats in the General Junta of the Principality of Asturias 23 seats needed for a majority
- Opinion polls
- Registered: 973,737 ▼1.4%
- Turnout: 536,734 (55.1%) ▼0.7 pp
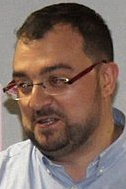

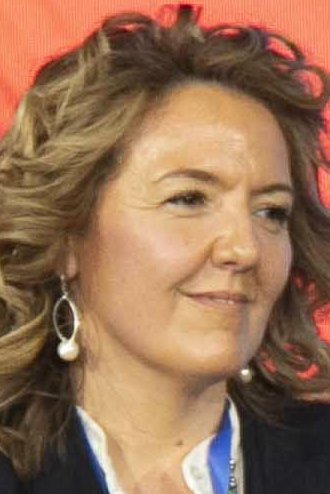

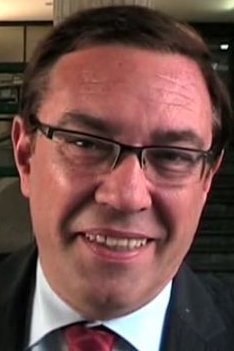

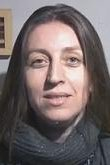

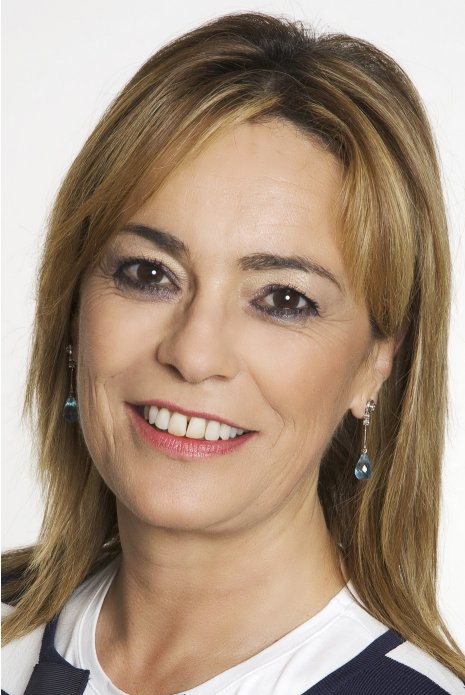

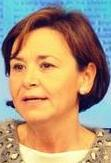

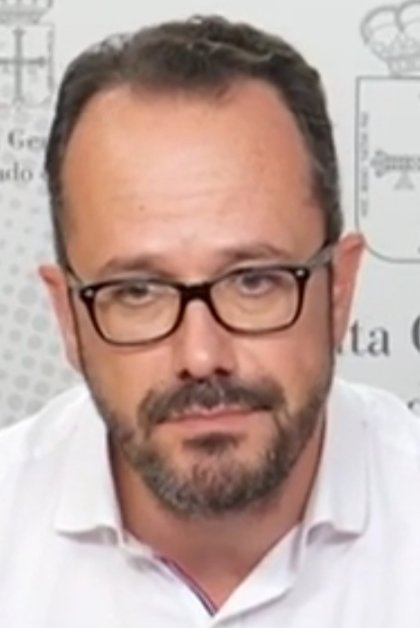
	First party	Second party	Third party
Leader	Adrián Barbón	Teresa Mallada	Juan Vázquez
Party	PSOE	PP	Cs
Leader since	17 September 2017	11 January 2019	2 March 2019
Leader's seat	Central	Central	Central
Last election	14 seats, 26.5%	11 seats, 21.6%	3 seats, 7.1%
Seats won	20	10	5
Seat change	▲6	▼1	▲2
Popular vote	187,462	93,147	74,271
Percentage	35.3%	17.5%	14.0%
Swing	▲8.8 pp	▼4.1 pp	▲6.9 pp
	Fourth party	Fifth party	Sixth party
Leader	Lorena Gil	Ángela Vallina	Carmen Moriyón
Party	Podemos Asturies	IU–IAS	FAC
Leader since	27 November 2018	10 March 2019	29 September 2018
Leader's seat	Central	Central	Central
Last election	9 seats, 19.1%	5 seats, 11.9%	3 seats, 8.2%
Seats won	4	2	2
Seat change	▼5	▼3	▼1
Popular vote	58,674	35,174	34,687
Percentage	11.0%	6.6%	6.5%
Swing	▼8.1 pp	▼5.3 pp	▼1.7 pp
	Seventh party
Leader	Ignacio Blanco
Party	Vox
Leader since	13 April 2015
Leader's seat	Central
Last election	0 seats, 0.6%
Seats won	2
Seat change	▲2
Popular vote	34,210
Percentage	6.4%
Swing	▲5.8 pp
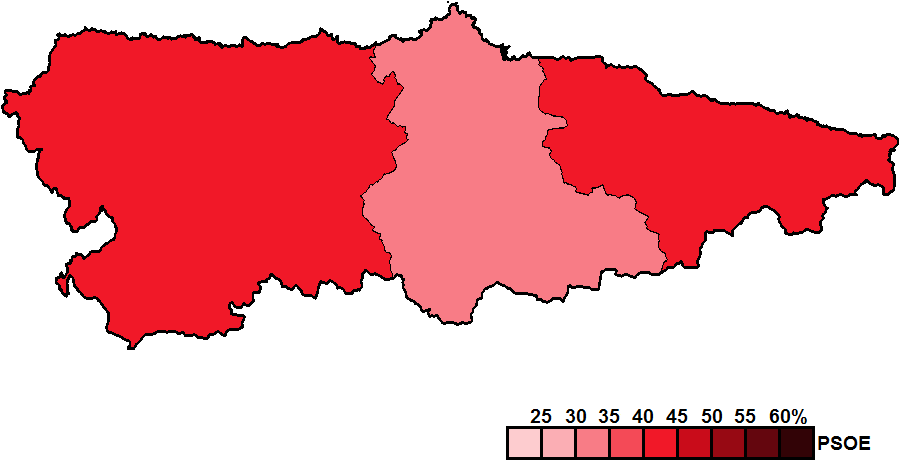
- Constituency results map for the General Junta of the Principality of Asturias
President before election
Javier Fernández
PSOE
Elected President
Adrián Barbón
PSOE

A regional election was held in Asturias on 26 May 2019 to elect the 11th General Junta of the autonomous community. All 45 seats in the General Junta were up for election. It was held concurrently with regional elections in eleven other autonomous communities and local elections all across Spain, as well as the 2019 European Parliament election.

== Overview ==
Under the 1981 Statute of Autonomy, the General Junta of the Principality of Asturias was the unicameral legislature of the homonymous autonomous community, having legislative power in devolved matters, as well as the ability to grant or withdraw confidence from a regional president. The electoral and procedural rules were supplemented by national law provisions.

=== Date ===
The term of the General Junta of the Principality of Asturias expired four years after the date of its previous election., with election day being fixed for the fourth Sunday of May every four years. The election decree was required to be issued no later than 54 days before the scheduled election date and published on the following day in the Official Gazette of the Principality of Asturias (BOPA). The previous election was held on 24 May 2015, setting the date for election day on the fourth Sunday of May four years later, which was 26 May 2019.

The regional president had the prerogative to dissolve the General Junta of the Principality of Asturias at any given time and call a snap election, provided that no motion of no confidence was in process, no nationwide election was due and some time requirements were met: namely, that dissolution did not occur either during the first legislative session or during the last year of parliament before its planned expiration, nor before one year after a previous one. In the event of an investiture process failing to elect a regional president within a two-month period from the first ballot, the General Junta was to be automatically dissolved and a fresh election called. Any snap election held as a result of these circumstances did not alter the date of the chamber's next ordinary election, with elected lawmakers serving the remainder of its original four-year term.

The election to the General Junta of the Principality of Asturias was officially called on 2 April 2019 with the publication of the corresponding decree in the BOPA, setting election day for 26 May.

=== Electoral system ===
Voting for the General Junta was based on universal suffrage, comprising all Spanish nationals over 18 years of age, registered in Asturias and with full political rights, provided that they had not been deprived of the right to vote by a final sentence.

The General Junta had a minimum of 35 and a maximum of 45 seats, with electoral provisions fixing its size at the latter number. All were elected in three multi-member constituencies—corresponding to sub-provincial divisions, each of which was assigned an initial minimum of two seats and the remaining 39 distributed in proportion to population—using the D'Hondt method and closed-list proportional voting, with a three percent-threshold of valid votes (including blank ballots) in each constituency. The use of this electoral method resulted in a higher effective threshold depending on district magnitude and vote distribution.

As a result of the aforementioned allocation, each General Junta constituency (comprising the municipalities indicated below) was entitled the following seats:

Seats	Constituencies	Municipalities
34	Central	Aller, Avilés, Bimenes, Carreño, Caso, Castrillón, Corvera de Asturias, Gijón, Gozón, Illas, Las Regueras, Langreo, Laviana, Lena, Llanera, Mieres, Morcín, Noreña, Oviedo, Proaza, Quirós, Ribera de Arriba, Riosa, San Martín del Rey Aurelio, Santo Adriano, Sariego, Siero, Sobrescobio, Soto del Barco
6	Western	Allande, Belmonte de Miranda, Boal, Candamo, Cangas del Narcea, Castropol, Coaña, Cudillero, Degaña, El Franco, Grado, Grandas de Salime, Ibias, Illano, Muros de Nalón, Navia, Pesoz, Pravia, Salas, San Martín de Oscos, Santa Eulalia de Oscos, San Tirso de Abres, Somiedo, Tapia de Casariego, Taramundi, Teverga, Tineo, Valdés, Vegadeo, Villanueva de Oscos, Villayón, Yernes y Tameza
5	Eastern	Amieva, Cabrales, Cabranes, Cangas de Onís, Caravia, Colunga, Llanes, Nava, Onís, Parres, Peñamellera Alta, Peñamellera Baja, Piloña, Ponga, Ribadedeva, Ribadesella, Villaviciosa

The law did not provide for by-elections to fill vacant seats; instead, any vacancies arising after the proclamation of candidates and during the legislative term were filled by the next candidates on the party lists or, when required, by designated substitutes.

=== Outgoing parliament ===
The table below shows the composition of the parliamentary groups in the chamber at the time of the election call.

Parliamentary composition in April 2019
Groups	Parties	Legislators	
Groups	Parties	Seats	Total
Socialist Parliamentary Group	PSOE	14	14
People's Parliamentary Group	PP	11	11
We Can Asturias Parliamentary Group	Podemos	9	9
United Left Parliamentary Group	IU/IX	5	5
Asturias Forum Parliamentary Group	FAC	3	3
Citizens Parliamentary Group	Cs	3	3

== Parties and candidates ==
The electoral law allowed for parties and federations registered in the interior ministry, alliances and groupings of electors to present lists of candidates. Parties and federations intending to form an alliance were required to inform the relevant electoral commission within 10 days of the election call, whereas groupings of electors needed to secure the signature of at least one percent of the electorate in the constituencies for which they sought election, disallowing electors from signing for more than one list. Additionally, a balanced composition of men and women was required in the electoral lists, so that candidates of either sex made up at least 40 percent of the total composition.

Below is a list of the main parties and alliances which contested the election:

Candidacy	Parties and alliances	Leading candidate	Ideology	Previous result		Gov.	Ref.
Candidacy	Parties and alliances	Leading candidate	Ideology	Vote %	Seats	Gov.	Ref.
PSOE	List: Spanish Socialist Workers' Party (PSOE)	Adrián Barbón	Social democracy	26.5%	14	Yes	
PP	List: People's Party (PP)	Teresa Mallada	Conservatism; Christian democracy	21.6%	11	No	
Podemos; Asturies	List: We Can Asturias (Podemos Asturies)	Lorena Gil	Left-wing populism Direct democracy Democratic socialism	19.1%	9	No	
IU–IAS	List: United Left of Asturias (IU/IX) – Communist Party of Asturias (PCA) – The Dawn Marxist Organization (La Aurora (OM)) – Republican Left (IR) – Feminist Party of Spain (PFE); Asturian Left (IAS)	Ángela Vallina	Socialism; Communism	11.9%	5	No	
FAC	List: Forum of Citizens (FAC)	Carmen Moriyón	Regionalism; Conservatism	8.2%	3	No	
Cs	List: Citizens–Party of the Citizenry (Cs)	Juan Vázquez	Liberalism	7.1%	3	No	
Vox	List: Vox (Vox)	Ignacio Blanco	Right-wing populism Ultranationalism; National conservatism	0.6%	0	No	

== Campaign ==
=== Party slogans ===
Party or alliance	Slogan (Spanish)	Slogan (Asturian)	English translation	Ref.
PSOE	« La mejor Asturias »	« La meyor Asturies »	"The best Asturias"	
PP	« Ilusión por Asturias » « Centrados en tu futuro »	« Ilusión por Asturies » « Centraos nel to futuru »	"Illusion for Asturias" "Focused on your future"	
Podemos	« Asturias en tus manos »	« Asturies nes tos manes »	"Asturias in your hands"	
IU–IAS	« Asturias por la izquierda »	« Asturies pela izquierda »	"Asturias by the left"	
Cs	« La Asturias de las oportunidades » « Sí, tú eres la oportunidad de Asturias »	« L'Asturies de les oportunidades » « Sí, tu yes la oportunidá d'Asturies »	"The Asturias of opportunities" "Yes, you are the opportunity of Asturias"	
FAC	« Con Carmen Moriyón, Asturias cambia y avanza »	« Con Carmen Moriyón, Asturies camuda y avanza »	"With Carmen Moriyón, Asturias changes and advances"	
Vox	« Tu voz en Asturias »	« La to voz n'Asturies »	"Your voice in Asturias"	

=== Debates ===
2019 Asturian regional election debates
Date	Organizer(s)	Moderator(s)	P Present (Note: Denotes a main invitee attending the event.)								
Date	Organizer(s)	Moderator(s)	PSOE	PP	Podemos	IU–IAS	FAC	Cs	Vox	Audience	Ref.
20 May	TPA	Nacho Monserrat	P Barbón	P Mallada	P Gil	P Vallina	P Moriyón	P Vázquez	P Blanco	6.9% (24,000)	

== Opinion polls ==
The table below lists voting intention estimates in reverse chronological order, showing the most recent first and using the dates when the survey fieldwork was done, as opposed to the date of publication. Where the fieldwork dates are unknown, the date of publication is given instead. The highest percentage figure in each polling survey is displayed with its background shaded in the leading party's colour. If a tie ensues, this is applied to the figures with the highest percentages. The "Lead" column on the right shows the percentage-point difference between the parties with the highest percentages in a poll. When available, seat projections determined by the polling organisations are displayed below (or in place of) the percentages in a smaller font; 23 seats were required for an absolute majority in the General Junta of the Principality of Asturias.

Color key:

Poll conducted after legal ban on opinion polls

Polling firm/Commissioner	Fieldwork date	Sample size	Turnout	PSOE	PP	Podemos	IU–IAS	FAC	Cs	PACMA	Vox	Unidas Podemos	Lead
2019 regional election	26 May 2019	—N/a	55.1	35.3; 20	17.5; 10	11.0; 4	6.6; 2	6.5; 2	14.0; 5	0.6; 0	6.4; 2	–	17.8
ElectoPanel/Electomanía	22–23 May 2019	?	?	31.4; 17	15.5; 7	14.7; 6	7.5; 3	5.7; 2	16.7; 8	–	7.1; 2	–	14.7
ElectoPanel/Electomanía	21–22 May 2019	?	?	31.5; 18	15.6; 7	14.1; 5	7.4; 3	5.9; 2	16.7; 8	–	7.0; 2	–	14.8
ElectoPanel/Electomanía	20–21 May 2019	?	?	31.6; 18	15.7; 7	14.1; 6	7.3; 2	6.0; 2	16.3; 7	–	7.4; 3	–	15.3
ElectoPanel/Electomanía	19–20 May 2019	?	?	31.7; 18	15.8; 7	14.0; 6	7.2; 3	6.0; 2	16.4; 7	–	7.1; 2	–	15.3
NC Report/La Razón	19 May 2019	?	?	32.1; 16	18.5; 8	? 7	? 4	? 2	? 5	–	? 3	–	13.6
DYM/La Nueva España	19 May 2019	?	?	35.0; 18	16.0; 7/8	13.0; 6	7.0; 2/3	4.0; 0/1	15.0; 6/7	–	9.0; 3/4	–	19.0
ElectoPanel/Electomanía	16–19 May 2019	?	?	31.8; 18	16.0; 7	13.0; 5	7.2; 2	6.2; 2	16.0; 8	–	7.4; 3	–	15.8
ElectoPanel/Electomanía	13–16 May 2019	?	?	31.9; 18	16.1; 7	12.5; 5	7.2; 2	6.8; 2	15.7; 8	–	7.6; 3	–	15.8
InvesMark/El Comercio	8–15 May 2019	1,100	?	31.2; 16/17	13.4; 6/7	15.1; 7	7.4; 2/3	5.2; 1/2	17.6; 8	–	7.3; 2	–	13.6
ElectoPanel/Electomanía	10–13 May 2019	?	?	30.9; 17	15.5; 7	12.4; 5	7.4; 3	6.7; 2	16.4; 8	–	8.3; 3	–	14.5
ElectoPanel/Electomanía	7–10 May 2019	?	?	30.6; 18	14.8; 7	12.0; 4	7.7; 3	6.7; 2	16.2; 8	–	9.2; 3	–	14.4
ElectoPanel/Electomanía	4–7 May 2019	?	?	29.9; 17	14.4; 7	12.1; 4	7.6; 3	7.1; 2	16.6; 8	–	9.5; 4	–	13.3
ElectoPanel/Electomanía	29 Apr–4 May 2019	?	?	29.6; 17	14.8; 7	12.0; 5	8.0; 3	7.0; 2	16.4; 8	–	8.8; 3	–	13.2
April 2019 general election	28 Apr 2019	—N/a	65.0	33.1; 17	17.9; 8	(Note: Within Unidas Podemos.)		(Note: Within PP.)	16.7; 8	1.1; 0	11.5; 4	17.1; 8	15.2
CIS	21 Mar–23 Apr 2019	584	?	30.8; 15/18	20.4; 10/11	17.0; 7/9	11.0; 4/5	3.7; 0/1	10.7; 4/5	–	4.6; 1	–	10.4
ElectoPanel/Electomanía	31 Mar–7 Apr 2019	?	?	27.2; 16	18.2; 10	11.9; 5	7.9; 3	4.0; 1	14.4; 6	–	10.8; 4	–	9.0
ElectoPanel/Electomanía	24–31 Mar 2019	?	?	27.3; 17	17.7; 10	11.6; 4	8.0; 3	4.2; 1	14.9; 6	–	10.9; 4	–	9.6
ElectoPanel/Electomanía	17–24 Mar 2019	?	?	28.2; 17	17.9; 10	11.2; 4	7.7; 3	4.1; 1	14.6; 6	–	10.7; 4	–	10.3
ElectoPanel/Electomanía	10–17 Mar 2019	?	?	26.9; 16	17.9; 10	11.3; 4	7.9; 3	4.2; 1	13.8; 6	–	12.8; 5	–	9.0
ElectoPanel/Electomanía	3–10 Mar 2019	?	?	26.5; 15	17.5; 10	11.5; 5	8.0; 3	4.3; 1	14.4; 6	–	12.7; 5	–	9.0
ElectoPanel/Electomanía	22 Feb–3 Mar 2019	?	?	26.3; 15	17.6; 10	11.8; 6	7.9; 3	4.1; 1	14.5; 5	–	12.7; 5	–	8.7
Asturbarómetro/La Nueva España	3 Jan 2019	401	?	24.1; 14	18.2; 10	12.5; 5	13.4; 5	3.2; 1	13.6; 5	–	12.6; 5	–	5.9
ElectoPanel/Electomanía	16–21 Dec 2018	450	?	23.8; 13	18.8; 10	13.7; 6	7.9; 3	3.8; 1	17.7; 8	0.6; 0	9.2; 4	–	5.0
SyM Consulting	10–12 Mar 2018	1,078	63.2	27.6; 13/14	20.8; 10	16.1; 7/8	14.6; 7	5.9; 2	10.1; 4/5	–	–	–	6.8
Asturbarómetro/El Comercio	4 Feb 2018	?	?	26.6; 15	22.4; 12	14.5; 6	12.1; 5	4.2; 1	15.3; 6	–	–	–	4.2
NC Report/AsturiasDiario	12–20 May 2017	1,200	49.1	24.1; 12	22.0; 11	19.6; 10	11.0; 5	7.2; 3	9.6; 4	–	–	–	2.1
2016 general election	26 Jun 2016	—N/a	61.1	24.9	35.3				12.6	1.1	0.2	23.9	10.4
2015 general election	20 Dec 2015	—N/a	63.8	23.3	30.1	21.3	8.4		13.6	0.7	0.3	–	6.8
2015 regional election	24 May 2015	—N/a	55.8	26.5; 14	21.6; 11	19.1; 9	11.9; 5	8.2; 3	7.1; 3	0.7; 0	0.6; 0	–	4.9

== Results ==
=== Overall ===
← Summary of the 26 May 2019 General Junta of the Principality of Asturias election results →
Parties and alliances	Popular vote			Seats	
Parties and alliances	Votes	%	±pp	Total	+/−
Spanish Socialist Workers' Party (PSOE)	187,462	35.26	+8.78	20	+6
People's Party (PP)	93,147	17.52	−4.07	10	−1
Citizens–Party of the Citizenry (Cs)	74,271	13.97	+6.85	5	+2
We Can Asturias (Podemos Asturies)	58,674	11.04	−8.02	4	−5
United Left–Asturian Left: Asturias by the Left (IU–IAS)	35,174	6.62	−5.32	2	−3
Forum of Citizens (FAC)	34,687	6.52	−1.67	2	−1
Vox (Vox)	34,210	6.43	+5.84	2	+2
Animalist Party Against Mistreatment of Animals (PACMA)	3,426	0.64	−0.09	0	±0
Greens–Equo (V–Q)	2,128	0.40	+0.03	0	±0
Andecha Astur (Andecha)	1,584	0.30	+0.12	0	±0
Communist Party of the Workers of Spain (PCTE)	1,083	0.20	New	0	±0
Blank ballots	5,858	1.10	−0.79		
Total	531,704			45	±0
Valid votes	531,704	99.06	+0.48		
Invalid votes	5,030	0.94	−0.48		
Votes cast / turnout	536,734	55.12	−0.67		
Abstentions	437,003	44.88	+0.67		
Registered voters	973,737				

Popular vote
PSOE	35.26%
PP	17.52%
Cs	13.97%
Podemos Ast.	11.04%
IU–IAS	6.62%
FAC	6.52%
Vox	6.43%
Others	1.55%
Blank ballots	1.10%

Seats
PSOE	44.44%
PP	22.22%
Cs	11.11%
Podemos Ast.	8.89%
IU–IAS	4.44%
FAC	4.44%
Vox	4.44%

=== Distribution by constituency ===
Constituency	PSOE		PP		Cs		Podemos		IU–IAS		FAC		Vox	
Constituency	%	S	%	S	%	S	%	S	%	S	%	S	%	S
Central	33.9	13	16.1	6	14.9	5	11.8	4	7.2	2	6.5	2	6.8	2
Eastern	40.5	3	22.2	2	10.5	−	7.8	−	3.3	−	8.9	−	5.1	−
Western	41.5	4	24.7	2	9.5	−	7.6	−	4.9	−	5.2	−	4.4	−
Total	35.3	20	17.5	10	14.0	5	11.0	4	6.6	2	6.5	2	6.4	2

== Aftermath ==
Just after the election, Asturias Forum candidate Carmen Moriyón renounced to take her seat in the General Junta, but continued as president of the party.

On 24 June 2019, the day of the constitution of the 11th General Junta, Juan Vázquez resigned as regional Cs spokesman due to divergences with the national leadership of the party.

Investiture
Ballot →	12 July 2019		15 July 2019	
Required majority →	23 out of 45		Simple	
Adrián Barbón (PSOE): • PSOE (20); • IU–IAS (2)	22 / 45	X mark	22 / 45	check
Abstentions: • PP (10); • Cs (5); • Podemos (4); • FAC (2); • Vox (2)	23 / 45		23 / 45	
Absentees	0 / 45		0 / 45	

== Bibliography ==
- Ley Orgánica 5/1985, de 19 de junio, del Régimen Electoral General (Organic Law 5/1985). Official State Gazette (in Spanish). 19 June 1985 [version as of 6 March 2019]. BOE-A-1985-11672.
- Ley Orgánica 7/1981, de 30 de diciembre, de Estatuto de Autonomía para Asturias (Organic Law 7/1981). Official State Gazette (in Spanish). 30 December 1981 [version as of 17 July 2010]. BOE-A-1982-634.
- Ley 6/1984, de 5 de julio, del Presidente y del Consejo de Gobierno del Principado de Asturias (Law 6/1984). Official State Gazette (in Spanish). 5 July 1984 [version as of 24 September 2018]. BOE-A-1984-19762.
- Ley 14/1986, de 26 de diciembre, sobre régimen de elecciones a la Junta General del Principado de Asturias (Law 14/1986). Official State Gazette (in Spanish). 26 December 1986 [version as of 27 March 1991]. BOE-A-1987-3910.
- Decreto 7/2019, de 1 de abril, del Presidente del Principado, por el que se convocan elecciones a la Junta General del Principado de Asturias (PDF) (Decree 7/2019). Official Gazette of the Principality of Asturias (in Spanish). 1 April 2019. 2019-03313.
