= 1987 Asturian regional election =

Election in the Spanish region of Asturias

- 10 June 1987

All 45 seats in the General Junta of the Principality of Asturias 23 seats needed for a majority
- Opinion polls
- Registered: 874,310 ▲0.1%
- Turnout: 582,077 (66.6%) ▲1.6 pp
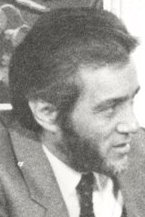

	First party	Second party	Third party
Leader	Pedro de Silva	Isidro Fernández Rozada	Alejandro Rebollo
Party	PSOE	AP	CDS
Leader since	15 March 1983	1983	1987
Leader's seat	Central	Central	Central
Last election	26 seats, 52.0%	14 seats, 30.2% (Note: Results for AP–PDP–UL in the 1983 election.)	0 seats, 3.5%
Seats won	20	13	8
Seat change	▼6	▼1	▲8
Popular vote	223,307	144,541	106,266
Percentage	38.9%	25.2%	18.5%
Swing	▼13.1 pp	▼5.0 pp	▲15.0 pp
	Fourth party
Leader	Francisco Javier Suárez
Party	IU
Leader since	1983
Leader's seat	Central
Last election	5 seats, 11.1% (Note: Results for PCA–PCE in the 1983 election.)
Seats won	4
Seat change	▼1
Popular vote	69,413
Percentage	12.1%
Swing	▲1.0 pp
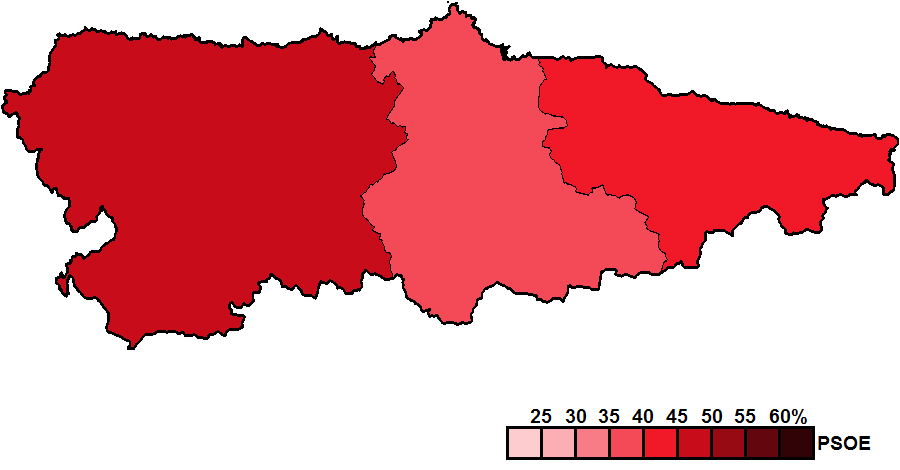
- Constituency results map for the General Junta of the Principality of Asturias
President before election
Pedro de Silva
PSOE
Elected President
Pedro de Silva
PSOE

The 1987 Asturian regional election was held on 10 June 1987 to elect the 2nd General Junta of the Principality of Asturias. All 45 seats in the General Junta were up for election. It was held concurrently with regional elections in twelve other autonomous communities and local elections all throughout Spain, as well as the 1987 European Parliament election.

The Spanish Socialist Workers' Party (PSOE) of incumbent President Pedro de Silva remained the most-voted party, but lost 13 percentage points as well as the absolute majority it had enjoyed in the previous legislature. The internal crisis within the People's Coalition after the breakup of the People's Democratic Party (PDP) from the alliance resulted in the People's Alliance (AP) standing alone in the election, losing 25,000 votes and 5 percentage points.

Disenchanted voters with the Socialist government that did not see AP as a credible opposition alternative went on to centrist Democratic and Social Centre (CDS), which saw a significant increase of its vote share and entered the General Junta with 8 seats. United Left (IU), the new incarnation of the Communist Party of Spain and its allies, lost 1 seat despite achieving more votes than in 1983.

== Overview ==
=== Electoral system ===
The General Junta of the Principality of Asturias was the devolved, unicameral legislature of the autonomous community of Asturias, having legislative power in regional matters as defined by the Spanish Constitution and the Asturian Statute of Autonomy, as well as the ability to vote confidence in or withdraw it from a regional president.

Voting for the General Junta was on the basis of universal suffrage, which comprised all nationals over 18 years of age, registered in Asturias and in full enjoyment of their political rights. The 45 members of the General Junta of the Principality of Asturias were elected using the D'Hondt method and a closed list proportional representation, with an electoral threshold of three percent of valid votes (Note: The 1986 electoral law lowered the electoral threshold from five percent regionally to three percent by constituency.)—which included blank ballots—being applied in each constituency. Seats were allocated to constituencies, which were established by law as follows:

- Central District, comprising the municipalities of Aller, Avilés, Bimenes, Carreño, Caso, Castrillón, Corvera de Asturias, Gijón, Gozón, Illas, Las Regueras, Langreo, Laviana, Lena, Llanera, Mieres, Morcín, Noreña, Oviedo, Proaza, Quirós, Ribera de Arriba, Riosa, San Martín del Rey Aurelio, Santo Adriano, Sariego, Siero, Sobrescobio and Soto del Barco.
- Eastern District, comprising the municipalities of Amieva, Cabrales, Cabranes, Cangas de Onís, Caravia, Colunga, Llanes, Nava, Onís, Parres, Peñamellera Alta, Peñamellera Baja, Piloña, Ponga, Ribadedeva, Ribadesella and Villaviciosa.
- Western District, comprising the municipalities of Allande, Belmonte de Miranda, Boal, Candamo, Cangas del Narcea, Castropol, Coaña, Cudillero, Degaña, El Franco, Grado, Grandas de Salime, Ibias, Illano, Muros de Nalón, Navia, Pesoz, Pravia, Salas, San Martín de Oscos, Santa Eulalia de Oscos, San Tirso de Abres, Somiedo, Tapia de Casariego, Taramundi, Teverga, Tineo, Valdés, Vegadeo, Villanueva de Oscos, Villayón and Yernes y Tameza.

Each constituency was allocated an initial minimum of two seats, with the remaining 39 being distributed in proportion to their populations.

In smaller constituencies, the use of the electoral method resulted in an effective threshold based on the district magnitude and the distribution of votes among candidacies.

=== Election date ===
The term of the General Junta of the Principality of Asturias expired four years after the date of its previous election. The election decree was required to be issued no later than the twenty-fifth day prior to the expiration date of parliament and published on the following day in the Official Gazette of the Principality of Asturias (BOPA), with election day taking place between the fifty-fourth and the sixtieth day from publication and set so as to make it coincide with elections to the regional assemblies of other autonomous communities. The previous election was held on 8 May 1983, which meant that the legislature's term would have expired on 8 May 1987. The election decree was required to be published in the BOPA no later than 14 April 1987, with the election taking place no later than the sixtieth day from publication, setting the latest possible election date for the General Junta on 13 June 1987.

The General Junta could not be dissolved before the expiration date of parliament except in the event of an investiture process failing to elect a regional president within a two-month period from the first ballot. In such a case, the General Junta was to be automatically dissolved and a snap election called, with elected lawmakers serving the remainder of its original four-year term.

== Parliamentary composition ==
The General Junta of the Principality of Asturias was officially dissolved on 14 April 1987, after the publication of the dissolution decree in the Official Gazette of the Principality of Asturias. The table below shows the composition of the parliamentary groups in the General Junta at the time of dissolution.

Parliamentary composition in April 1987
Groups	Parties	Legislators	
Groups	Parties	Seats	Total
Socialist Parliamentary Group	PSOE	27	27
People's Parliamentary Group	AP	10	10
People's Parliamentary Group	PCA–PCE	4	4
Mixed Parliamentary Group	PDP	3	4
Mixed Parliamentary Group	INDEP	1 (Note: Maximino Gorostiza, former AP legislator.)	4

== Parties and candidates ==
The electoral law allowed for parties and federations registered in the interior ministry, coalitions and groupings of electors to present lists of candidates. Parties and federations intending to form a coalition ahead of an election were required to inform the relevant Electoral Commission within ten days of the election call, whereas groupings of electors needed to secure the signature of at least one percent of the electorate in the constituencies for which they sought election, disallowing electors from signing for more than one list of candidates.

Below is a list of the main parties and electoral alliances which contested the election:

Candidacy	Parties and alliances	Leading candidate	Ideology	Previous result		Gov.	Ref.
Candidacy	Parties and alliances	Leading candidate	Ideology	Vote %	Seats	Gov.	Ref.
PSOE	List: Spanish Socialist Workers' Party (PSOE)	Pedro de Silva	Social democracy	52.0%	26	Yes	
AP	List: People's Alliance (AP)	Isidro Fernández Rozada	Conservatism; National conservatism	30.2%	14	No	
PDP	List: People's Democratic Party (PDP)	Celestino de Nicolás	Christian democracy	30.2%	14	No	
IU	List: Communist Party of Asturias (PCA–PCE); Socialist Action Party (PASOC); Communist Party of the Peoples of Spain (PCPE); Progressive Federation (FP); Republican Left (IR)	Francisco Javier Suárez	Socialism; Communism	11.1%	5	No	
CDS	List: Democratic and Social Centre (CDS)	Alejandro Rebollo	Centrism; Liberalism	3.5%	0	No	

== Opinion polls ==
The tables below list opinion polling results in reverse chronological order, showing the most recent first and using the dates when the survey fieldwork was done, as opposed to the date of publication. Where the fieldwork dates are unknown, the date of publication is given instead. The highest percentage figure in each polling survey is displayed with its background shaded in the leading party's colour. If a tie ensues, this is applied to the figures with the highest percentages. The "Lead" column on the right shows the percentage-point difference between the parties with the highest percentages in a poll.

=== Voting intention estimates ===
The table below lists weighted voting intention estimates. Refusals are generally excluded from the party vote percentages, while question wording and the treatment of "don't know" responses and those not intending to vote may vary between polling organisations. When available, seat projections determined by the polling organisations are displayed below (or in place of) the percentages in a smaller font; 23 seats were required for an absolute majority in the General Junta of the Principality of Asturias.

Polling firm/Commissioner	Fieldwork date	Sample size	Turnout	PSOE	AP–PDP–PL	IU	CDS	AP	PDP	Lead
1987 regional election	10 Jun 1987	—N/a	66.6	38.9; 20	–	12.1; 4	18.5; 8	25.2; 13	0.6; 0	13.7
Demoscopia/El País	22–26 May 1987	?	64	36.7; 19/20	–	11.6; 5/6	17.0; 8/9	24.0; 11	2.5; 0	12.7
Sofemasa/AP	16 Apr 1987	?	?	39.2	–	12.9	18.5	24.0	1.0	15.2
1986 general election	22 Jun 1986	—N/a	67.8	46.0	27.2	9.2	13.2	(Note: Within CP.)		18.8
1983 regional election	8 May 1983	—N/a	65.0	52.0; 26	30.2; 14	11.1 (Note: Result for PCA–PCE.); 5	3.5; 0			21.8

=== Voting preferences ===
The table below lists raw, unweighted voting preferences.

Color key:

Poll conducted after legal ban on opinion polls

Polling firm/Commissioner	Fieldwork date	Sample size	PSOE	AP–PDP–PL	IU	CDS	AP	PDP	Question	X mark	Lead
1987 regional election	10 Jun 1987	—N/a	25.6	–	8.0	12.2	16.6	0.4	—N/a	33.2	9.0
CIS	29 May–5 Jun 1987	1,386	29.3	–	9.6	9.4	10.2	0.3	32.8	7.1	19.1
CIS	8–16 May 1987	2,193	30.0	–	7.0	10.0	8.0	0.0	34.0	9.0	20.0
CIS	3–15 Apr 1987	2,185	34.0	–	7.0	11.0	8.0	–	29.0	8.0	23.0
CIS	6–26 Feb 1987	2,872	30.0	–	7.0	8.0	9.0	–	30.0	14.0	21.0
1986 general election	22 Jun 1986	—N/a	31.0	18.4	6.2	8.9			—N/a	31.2	12.6
1983 regional election	8 May 1983	—N/a	33.6	19.5	7.2	2.2			—N/a	35.0	14.1

=== Victory preferences ===
The table below lists opinion polling on the victory preferences for each party in the event of a regional election taking place.

Color key:

Poll conducted after legal ban on opinion polls

Polling firm/Commissioner	Fieldwork date	Sample size	PSOE	AP	IU	CDS	Other/ None	Question	Lead
CIS	29 May–5 Jun 1987	1,386	35.9	12.1	11.3	12.1	1.7	26.9	23.8
CIS	8–16 May 1987	2,193	36.0	10.0	9.0	13.0	1.0	30.0	23.0
CIS	3–15 Apr 1987	2,185	37.0	10.0	9.0	13.0	2.0	30.0	24.0
CIS	6–26 Feb 1987	2,872	34.0	11.0	7.0	10.0	2.0	35.0	23.0

=== Victory likelihood ===
The table below lists opinion polling on the perceived likelihood of victory for each party in the event of a regional election taking place.

Color key:

Poll conducted after legal ban on opinion polls

Polling firm/Commissioner	Fieldwork date	Sample size	PSOE	AP	IU	CDS	Other/ None	Question	Lead
CIS	29 May–5 Jun 1987	1,386	63.7	3.8	2.5	3.2	0.1	26.6	59.9
CIS	8–16 May 1987	2,193	61.0	4.0	2.0	4.0	0.0	28.0	57.0
CIS	3–15 Apr 1987	2,185	61.0	2.0	1.0	3.0	0.0	33.0	58.0
CIS	6–26 Feb 1987	2,872	55.0	3.0	1.0	3.0	0.0	38.0	52.0

=== Preferred President ===
The table below lists opinion polling on leader preferences to become president of the Principality of Asturias.

Color key:

Poll conducted after legal ban on opinion polls

Polling firm/Commissioner	Fieldwork date	Sample size						Other/ None/ Not care	Question	Lead
Polling firm/Commissioner	Fieldwork date	Sample size	De Silva PSOE	Rozada AP	Suárez IU	Rebollo CDS	De Nicolás PDP	Other/ None/ Not care	Question	Lead
CIS	29 May–5 Jun 1987	1,386	32.9	10.2	7.6	5.0	0.4	15.0	28.9	22.7
CIS	8–16 May 1987	2,193	30.0	6.0	4.0	5.0	0.0	22.0	33.0	24.0
CIS	3–15 Apr 1987	2,185	27.0	4.0	4.0	4.0	–	21.0	37.0	23.0

== Results ==
=== Overall ===
← Summary of the 10 June 1987 General Junta of the Principality of Asturias election results →
Parties and alliances	Popular vote			Seats	
Parties and alliances	Votes	%	±pp	Total	+/−
Spanish Socialist Workers' Party (PSOE)	223,307	38.91	−13.05	20	−6
People's Alliance (AP)^{1}	144,541	25.18	−5.05	13	−1
Democratic and Social Centre (CDS)	106,266	18.52	+15.07	8	+8
United Left (IU)^{2}	69,413	12.09	+0.96	4	−1
Asturianist Party (PAS)	7,348	1.28	New	0	±0
Workers' Party of Spain–Communist Unity (PTE–UC)	4,875	0.85	New	0	±0
People's Democratic Party (PDP)	3,606	0.63	New	0	±0
Asturian Nationalist Ensame (ENA)	2,809	0.49	+0.05	0	±0
Workers' Socialist Party (PST)	2,493	0.43	−0.40	0	±0
Humanist Platform (PH)	1,251	0.22	New	0	±0
Spanish Phalanx of the CNSO (FE–JONS)	957	0.17	New	0	±0
Blank ballots	7,076	1.23	+0.82		
Total	573,942			45	±0
Valid votes	573,942	98.60	−0.74		
Invalid votes	8,135	1.40	+0.74		
Votes cast / turnout	582,077	66.58	+1.54		
Abstentions	292,233	33.42	−1.54		
Registered voters	874,310				
Sources
Footnotes: ^{1} People's Alliance results are compared to People's Coalition totals in the 1983 election.; ^{2} United Left results are compared to Communist Party of Asturias totals in the 1983 election.

Popular vote
PSOE	38.91%
AP	25.18%
CDS	18.52%
IU	12.09%
PAS	1.28%
Others	2.79%
Blank ballots	1.23%

Seats
PSOE	44.44%
AP	28.89%
CDS	17.78%
IU	8.89%

=== Distribution by constituency ===
Constituency	PSOE		AP		CDS		IU	
Constituency	%	S	%	S	%	S	%	S
Central	37.0	13	23.6	8	19.9	7	13.6	4
Eastern	44.3	3	35.3	2	13.6	−	3.7	−
Western	45.9	4	27.8	3	13.8	1	8.7	−
Total	38.9	20	25.2	13	18.5	8	12.1	4

== Aftermath ==
Investiture
Ballot →	22 June 1987		24 June 1987	
Required majority →	23 out of 45		Simple	
Pedro de Silva (PSOE): • PSOE (20)	20 / 45	X mark	20 / 45	check
Abstentions: • AP (13); • CDS (8); • IU (4)	25 / 45		25 / 45	
Absentees	0 / 45		0 / 45	
