= 1983 Asturian regional election =

Election in the Spanish region of Asturias

- 8 May 1983

All 45 seats in the General Junta of the Principality of Asturias 23 seats needed for a majority
- Opinion polls
- Registered: 873,690
- Turnout: 568,271 (65.0%)
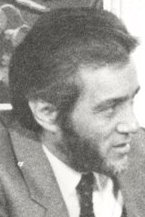

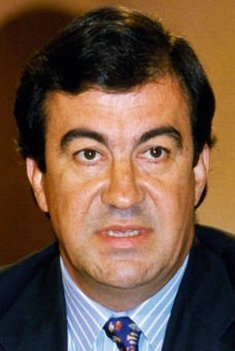

	First party	Second party	Third party
Leader	Pedro de Silva	Francisco Álvarez Cascos	Francisco Javier Suárez
Party	PSOE	AP–PDP–PL	PCE
Leader since	15 March 1983	1983	1983
Leader's seat	Central	Central	Central
Seats won	26	14	5
Popular vote	293,320	170,654	62,855
Percentage	52.0%	30.2%	11.1%
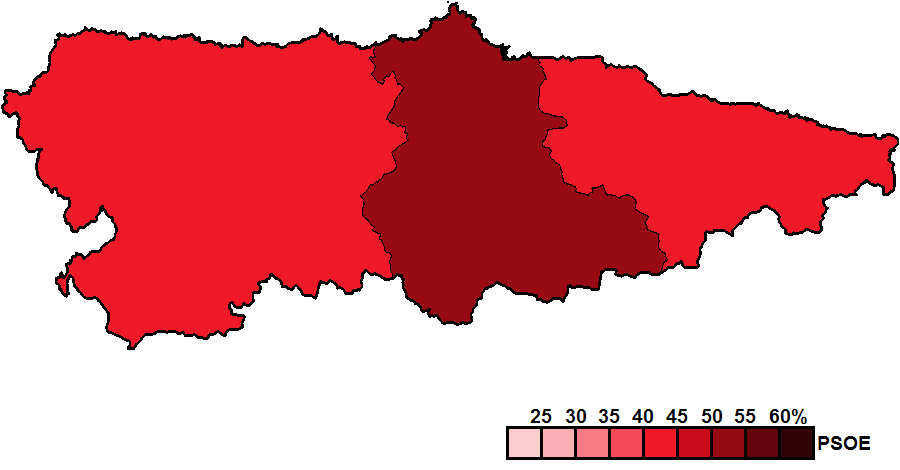
- Constituency results map for the General Junta of the Principality of Asturias
President before election
Rafael Fernández
PSOE
Elected President
Pedro de Silva
PSOE

The 1983 Asturian regional election was held on 8 May 1983 to elect the 1st General Junta of the Principality of Asturias. All 45 seats in the General Junta were up for election. It was held concurrently with regional elections in twelve other autonomous communities and local elections all throughout Spain.

The Spanish Socialist Workers' Party (PSOE) scored a landslide victory by securing a comfortable absolute majority of 26 out of 45 seats, with 52% of the vote. The People's Coalition, headed by the conservative People's Alliance and joined by the People's Democratic Party (PDP) and the Liberal Union (UL) became the second political force and the main opposition party in the General Junta with 14 seats and 30.2%. The Communist Party of Spain (PCE) obtained 5 seats and 11.1%, whereas the Democratic and Social Centre (CDS) was left as an extra-parliamentary party after failing to reach the 5% regional threshold. The former ruling party of Spain, the Union of the Democratic Centre (UCD), had chosen to dissolve itself in February 1983 and did not contest the election as a result.

After the election, Socialist Pedro de Silva replaced Rafael Fernández as president of the Principality of Asturias. The election remains, together with 1999, the only occasion to date in which a party has obtained an absolute majority of seats on its own in an Asturian regional election.

== Overview ==
=== Electoral system ===
The General Junta of the Principality of Asturias was the devolved, unicameral legislature of the autonomous community of Asturias, having legislative power in regional matters as defined by the Spanish Constitution of 1978 and the regional Statute of Autonomy, as well as the ability to vote confidence in or withdraw it from a regional president.

Transitory Provision First of the Statute established a specific electoral procedure for the first election to the General Junta of the Principality of Asturias, to be supplemented by the provisions within Royal Decree-Law 20/1977, of 18 March, and its related regulations. Voting for the General Junta was on the basis of universal suffrage, which comprised all nationals over 18 years of age, registered in Asturias and in full enjoyment of their civil and political rights. The 45 members of the General Junta of the Principality of Asturias were elected using the D'Hondt method and a closed list proportional representation, with an electoral threshold of five percent of valid votes—which included blank ballots—being applied regionally. Seats were allocated to constituencies, which were established as follows:

- Central District, comprising the municipalities of Aller, Avilés, Bimenes, Carreño, Caso, Castrillón, Corvera de Asturias, Gijón, Gozón, Illas, Las Regueras, Langreo, Laviana, Lena, Llanera, Mieres, Morcín, Noreña, Oviedo, Proaza, Quirós, Ribera de Arriba, Riosa, San Martín del Rey Aurelio, Santo Adriano, Sariego, Siero, Sobrescobio and Soto del Barco.
- Eastern District, comprising the municipalities of Amieva, Cabrales, Cabranes, Cangas de Onís, Caravia, Colunga, Llanes, Nava, Onís, Parres, Peñamellera Alta, Peñamellera Baja, Piloña, Ponga, Ribadedeva, Ribadesella and Villaviciosa.
- Western District, comprising the municipalities of Allande, Belmonte de Miranda, Boal, Candamo, Cangas del Narcea, Castropol, Coaña, Cudillero, Degaña, El Franco, Grado, Grandas de Salime, Ibias, Illano, Muros de Nalón, Navia, Pesoz, Pravia, Salas, San Martín de Oscos, Santa Eulalia de Oscos, San Tirso de Abres, Somiedo, Tapia de Casariego, Taramundi, Teverga, Tineo, Valdés, Vegadeo, Villanueva de Oscos, Villayón and Yernes y Tameza.

Each constituency was allocated a fixed number of seats: 32 for the Central District, 5 for the Eastern District and 8 for the Western District.

=== Election date ===
The Council of Government of the Principality of Asturias, in agreement with the Government of Spain, was required to call an election to the General Junta of the Principality of Asturias within from 1 February to 31 May 1983. On 7 March 1983, it was confirmed that the first election to the General Junta of the Principality of Asturias would be held on 8 May, together with regional elections for twelve other autonomous communities as well as nationwide local elections, with the election decree being published in the Official Gazette of the Principality of Asturias and of the Province on 10 March.

== Background ==
The approval of a statute of autonomy for the Principality of Asturias was subject to the "slow-track" procedure set down under Article 143 of the Spanish Constitution of 1978. This route had been favoured by the governing party of Spain, the Union of the Democratic Centre (UCD), and more reluctantly by the Spanish Socialist Workers' Party (PSOE), the Communist Party of Spain (PCE) and the People's Alliance (AP), which had initially advocated for the "fast-track" route of Article 151; the difference between both procedures being the pace in the process of devolution.

Starting in October 1977, deputies and senators from the four parties having won parliamentary representation in Asturias at the 1977 Spanish general election—PSOE, UCD, AP and PCE—initiated procedures for requesting the central government a pre-autonomic regime for the region, which was granted in 1978 through the establishment of a Regional Council with Socialist Rafael Fernández at its head and members from the aforementioned four political parties. The autonomy Statute was finally approved in 1981 after the signing of the "autonomic pacts" between UCD and PSOE, coming into force on 31 January 1982.

The first regional government of the autonomous community came to be formed by a PSOE–PCE coalition in April 1982. The investiture process to re-elect Rafael Fernández to the post had come under trouble over discrepancies on the government composition, after the PSOE unsuccessfully attempted to invite all other parties into a national unity government or form a single-party government without the PCE until the celebration of the first regional election, and with the PCE's refusal to support the PSOE candidate without entering the regional cabinet risking a political deadlock or a UCD–AP government in the region. While as president, Fernández maintained a moderate profile aimed at broadening the PSOE's support ahead of the incoming 1982 and 1983 elections, with the Principality having become both an experiment on the Socialists's government capabilities at large as well as an electoral stronghold for the party.

== Parliamentary composition ==
The composition of the provisional General Junta was determined by the provisions of Transitory Provision Second of the Statute, which established that its members be indirectly elected as follows:

- a) the elected members for the region in the national Cortes Generales;
- b) the provincial deputies who had been elected at the 1979 local elections; and
- c) 14 appointed members, distributed among the political parties in accordance with their seat results—both deputies and senators—in the previous general election.

As a result, the composition of the provisional General Junta of the Principality of Asturias, upon its constitution in March 1982, was established as indicated below:

Parliamentary composition in March 1982
Parties	Cortes Generales		Prov. dep.	App.	Seats	
Parties	Dep.	Sen.	Prov. dep.	App.	Total	+/−
PSOE	4	3	10	7	24	n/a
UCD	4	1	14	5	24	n/a
PCA–PCE	1	0	5	1	7	n/a
AP	1	0	1	1	3	n/a
Total	10	4	30	14	58	n/a

The 1982 Spanish general election resulted in changes in the composition of the provisional regional assembly, in accordance with the new seat distribution of Cortes Generales members in the region. Changes shown include former UCD provincial deputy Manuel Rodríguez Zapico leaving the UCD's parliamentary caucus and joining the Mixed Group as an independent on 23 March 1982.

Parliamentary composition in November 1982
Parties	Cortes Generales		Prov. dep.	App.	Seats	
Parties	Dep.	Sen.	Prov. dep.	App.	Total	+/−
PSOE	6	3	10	9	28	+4
UCD (Note: Two further UCD deputies would leave the party's parliamentary caucus and join the Mixed Group in December 1982, before the new chamber's composition led to the Speaker of the assembly, UCD's Agustín Antuña, to be replaced by PSOE member Eugenio Carvajal on 14 January 1983.)	0	0	13	0	13	−11
AP–PDP	3	1	1	4	9	+6
PCA–PCE	1	0	5	1	7	±0
INDEP	0	0	1	0	1	+1
Total	10	4	30	14	58	±0

== Parties and candidates ==
The electoral law allowed for parties and federations registered in the interior ministry, coalitions and groupings of electors to present lists of candidates. Parties and federations intending to form a coalition ahead of an election were required to inform the relevant Electoral Commission within fifteen days of the election call, whereas groupings of electors needed to secure the signature of at least one-thousandth of the electorate in the constituencies for which they sought election—with a compulsory minimum of 500 signatures—disallowing electors from signing for more than one list of candidates. A minimum of three deputies was required for the constitution of parliamentary groups in the General Junta of the Principality of Asturias.

Below is a list of the main parties and electoral alliances which contested the election:

Candidacy	Parties and alliances	Leading candidate	Ideology	Gov.	Ref.
PSOE	List: Spanish Socialist Workers' Party (PSOE)	Pedro de Silva	Social democracy	Yes	
AP–PDP–UL	List: People's Alliance (AP); People's Democratic Party (PDP); Liberal Union (UL)	Francisco Álvarez Cascos	Conservatism; Christian democracy	No	
PCA–PCE	List: Communist Party of Asturias (PCA–PCE)	Francisco Javier Suárez	Eurocommunism	Yes	

The electoral disaster of the Union of the Democratic Centre (UCD) in the October 1982 general election and the outcome of its extraordinary congress held in December, in which the party's leadership chose to transform the UCD into a christian democratic political force, brought the party to a process of virtual disintegration as many of its remaining members either switched party allegiances, split into new, independent candidacies or left politics altogether. Subsequent attempts to seek electoral allies ahead of the incoming 1983 local and regional elections, mainly the conservative People's Alliance (AP) and the christian democratic People's Democratic Party (PDP), had limited success due to concerns from both AP and UCD over such an alliance policy: AP strongly rejected any agreement that implied any sort of global coalition with UCD due to the party's ongoing decomposition, and prospects about a possible PDP–UCD merger did not come into fruition because of the latter's reluctance to dilute its brand within another party. By the time the UCD's executive had voted for the liquidation of the party's mounting debts and its subsequent dissolution on 18 February 1983, electoral alliances with the AP–PDP coalition had only been agreed in some provinces of the Basque Country and Galicia.

Together with AP, the PDP had agreed to maintain their general election alliance—now rebranded as the People's Coalition—for the May local and regional elections, with the inclusion of the Liberal Union (UL), a political party created in January 1983 out of independents from the AP–PDP coalition in an attempt to appeal to former UCD liberal voters. The Coalition had seen its numbers soar from late February as a result of many former members from the UCD's christian democratic wing joining the PDP.

The Spanish Socialist Workers' Party (PSOE) chose not to field incumbent president Rafael Fernández as their leading candidate, after several clashes between Fernández and the party's regional leadership, instead proposing Pedro de Silva, secretary general of the Socialist Parliamentary Group in the Congress of Deputies up until then, for the post of regional premier.

== Opinion polls ==
The tables below list opinion polling results in reverse chronological order, showing the most recent first and using the dates when the survey fieldwork was done, as opposed to the date of publication. Where the fieldwork dates are unknown, the date of publication is given instead. The highest percentage figure in each polling survey is displayed with its background shaded in the leading party's colour. If a tie ensues, this is applied to the figures with the highest percentages. The "Lead" column on the right shows the percentage-point difference between the parties with the highest percentages in a poll.

=== Voting intention estimates ===
The table below lists weighted voting intention estimates. Refusals are generally excluded from the party vote percentages, while question wording and the treatment of "don't know" responses and those not intending to vote may vary between polling organisations. When available, seat projections determined by the polling organisations are displayed below (or in place of) the percentages in a smaller font; 23 seats were required for an absolute majority in the General Junta of the Principality of Asturias.

Polling firm/Commissioner	Fieldwork date	Sample size	Turnout	PSOE	UCD	PCA–PCE	AP–PDP–UL	CDS	Lead
1983 regional election	8 May 1983	—N/a	65.0	52.0; 26	–	11.1; 5	30.2; 14	3.5; 0	21.8
Sofemasa/El País	23–26 Apr 1983	?	?	49.8; 26/29	–	? 4/6	? 12/14	3.0; 0	?
PSOE	Feb 1983	?	?	? 24	? 2	? 3	? 15	? 1	?
1982 general election	28 Oct 1982	—N/a	77.6	52.1; 28	4.9; 0	8.1; 3	27.9 (Note: Results for CD (1979) and AP–PDP (1982).); 14	4.3; 0	24.2
1979 general election	1 Mar 1979	—N/a	62.7	37.3; 19	33.0; 18	13.7; 5	8.6; 3	–	4.3

=== Voting preferences ===
The table below lists raw, unweighted voting preferences.

Polling firm/Commissioner	Fieldwork date	Sample size	PSOE	UCD	PCA–PCE	AP–PDP–UL	CDS	Question	X mark	Lead
1983 regional election	8 May 1983	—N/a	33.6	–	7.2	19.5	2.2	—N/a	35.0	14.1
CISE–Metra Seis–ECO/CIS	5–11 Apr 1983	500	49.9	–	2.4	10.6	1.9	20.1	14.3	39.3
1982 general election	28 Oct 1982	—N/a	39.8	3.7	6.2	21.3	3.3	—N/a	22.4	18.5
1979 general election	1 Mar 1979	—N/a	23.1	20.4	8.5	5.3	–	—N/a	37.3	2.7

== Results ==
=== Overall ===
Summary of the 8 May 1983 General Junta of the Principality of Asturias election results →
Parties and alliances	Popular vote			Seats	
Parties and alliances	Votes	%	±pp	Total	+/−
Spanish Socialist Workers' Party (PSOE)	293,320	51.96	n/a	26	n/a
People's Coalition (AP–PDP–UL)	170,654	30.23	n/a	14	n/a
Communist Party of Asturias (PCA–PCE)	62,855	11.13	n/a	5	n/a
Democratic and Social Centre (CDS)	19,495	3.45	n/a	0	n/a
Workers' Socialist Party (PST)	4,703	0.83	n/a	0	n/a
Communist Candidacy (PRUC–PCPE)	4,226	0.75	n/a	0	n/a
Asturian Left (MC–LCR)	2,833	0.50	n/a	0	n/a
Asturian Nationalist Ensame (ENA)	2,505	0.44	n/a	0	n/a
Popular Struggle Coalition (CLP)	867	0.15	n/a	0	n/a
Youth Students and Workers (MEyT)	764	0.14	n/a	0	n/a
Blank ballots	2,298	0.41	n/a		
Total	564,520			45	n/a
Valid votes	564,520	99.34	n/a		
Invalid votes	3,751	0.66	n/a		
Votes cast / turnout	568,271	65.04	n/a		
Abstentions	305,419	34.96	n/a		
Registered voters	873,690				

Popular vote
PSOE	51.96%
AP–PDP–UL	30.23%
PCE	11.13%
CDS	3.45%
Others	2.82%
Blank ballots	0.41%

Seats
PSOE	57.78%
AP–PDP–UL	31.11%
PCE	11.11%

=== Distribution by constituency ===
Constituency	PSOE		CP		PCA	
Constituency	%	S	%	S	%	S
Central	54.5	19	27.6	9	11.6	4
Eastern	43.8	3	42.3	2	8.3	−
Western	42.6	4	37.2	3	10.4	1
Total	52.0	26	30.2	14	11.1	5

== Aftermath ==
Under Article 32 of the Statute, investiture processes to elect the president of the Principality of Asturias required of an absolute majority—more than half the votes cast—to be obtained in the first ballot. If unsuccessful, new ballots would be held within 48-hour periods requiring only of a simple majority—more affirmative than negative votes—to succeed. In the event of the investiture process failing to elect a regional president within a two-month period from the first ballot, the General Junta was to be automatically dissolved and a fresh election called, with elected deputies merely serving out what remained of their four-year terms.

On 17 June 1983, Pedro de Silva, the candidate proposed by the Spanish Socialist Workers' Party (PSOE), was elected as new president of the Principality with an absolute majority of votes.

Investiture; Pedro de Silva (PSOE)
Ballot →	17 June 1983
Required majority →	23 out of 45
Yes: • PSOE (26)	26 / 45
No: • AP–PDP–UL (14)	14 / 45
Abstentions: • PCA (5)	5 / 45
Absentees	0 / 45
