= Lorena Gil =

Spanish politician (born 1975)

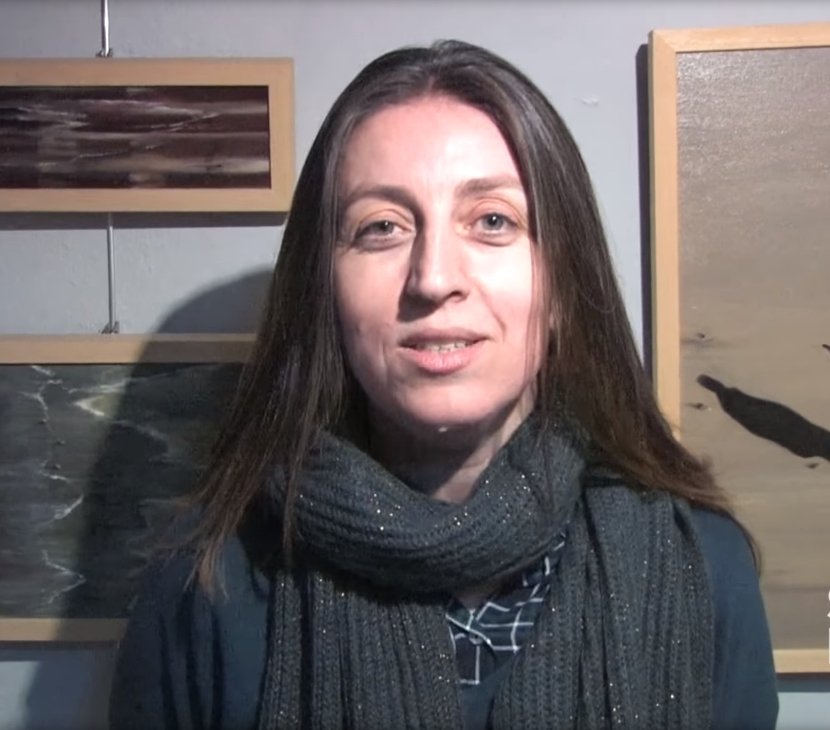

Member of the General Junta of the Principality of Asturias
- In office 16 June 2015 – 19 November 2020
- Parliamentary group: Podemos
- Constituency: Central

Personal details
- Born: 1975 (age 50–51) Gijón, Asturias, Spain
- Party: Podemos
- Education: English philology, University of Oviedo and University of Bonn; Political Sciences, National University of Distance Education
- Occupation: Politician
- Languages spoken: Spanish, German, English, Italian, Catalan, Asturian

Lorena Gil (born 1975, Gijón, Asturias) is a Spanish politician who served as member of the General Junta of the Principality of Asturias from 2015 to 2020 and who lead Podemos Asturies into the 2019 regional elections in Asturias.

== Biography ==
Lorena Gil started her studies in English philology in the University of Oviedo but she later moved to finish it in the University of Bonn. She did an internship in the Bundestag. She later finished a degree in political sciences in the National University of Distance Education. Before joining politics she had worked at the Spanish Institute for Foreign Trade and industrial multinational DuPont.

Almost after its funding, Gil joined Podemos and became an important figure in the party in Asturias. In the regional elections of 2015, she won a seat with the party in the General Junta of the Principality of Asturias. She became deputy spokesperson for the parliamentary group, something that gave her the sufficient importance inside the party to win the primaries for leader in 2018. She therefore lead Podemos Asturies into the 2019 regional elections, gaining four seats. Gil resigned in 2020 and left active politics. Her resignation happened at a time of important internal tensions in the party.
