= 1983 Spanish regional elections =

| 8 May 1983 | 1987 → |

764 seats in the regional parliaments of Aragon, Asturias, Balearic Islands, Canary Islands, Cantabria, Castile and León, Castilla–La Mancha, Extremadura, La Rioja, Madrid, Murcia, Navarre and Valencian Community
Regional administrations after the 1983 regional elections
National parties
PSOE
AP–PDP–UL
Regional parties
CiU
EAJ/PNV

Regional elections were held in Spain during 1983 to elect the regional parliaments of thirteen of the seventeen autonomous communities: Aragon, Asturias, the Balearic Islands, the Canary Islands, Cantabria, Castile and León, Castilla–La Mancha, Extremadura, La Rioja, Madrid, Murcia, Navarre and the Valencian Community). 764 of 1,139 seats in the regional parliaments were up for election. The elections were held on 6 May (concurrently with local elections all across the country).

The Spanish Socialist Workers' Party (PSOE) emerged as the largest party in 11 out of the 13 autonomous communities holding elections, reaching or nearing the absolute majority in 9 (Aragon, Asturias, Castilla–La Mancha, Castile and León, Extremadura, La Rioja, Madrid, Murcia and Valencian Community) and winning a plurality in the Canary Islands and Navarre. The conservative People's Coalition (AP–PDP–UL) was victorious in the Balearic Islands and Cantabria, securing a majority of seats in the latter. The Communist Party of Spain (PCE) saw an improvement of its results over those obtained in the October 1982 general election, while other minor national parties, such as the Democratic and Social Centre (CDS) and the Liberal Democratic Party (PDL) failed to make significant inroads.

The elections resulted in the full institutionalization—for the first time in the history of Spain—of an administrative structure of political power between that of the state and of the local councils, represented in the figure of the new autonomous communities.

== Regional governments ==
The following table lists party control in autonomous communities.

| Election day | Region | Previous control | New control |
|---|---|---|---|
| 8 May | Aragon | Independent (ex-UCD) (Note: The UCD was dissolved as a political party in February 1983, with its regional presidents and elected officials maintaining their offices either as independents or joining other parties ahead of the May 1983 regional elections.) | Spanish Socialist Workers' Party (PSOE) |
| 8 May | Asturias | Spanish Socialist Workers' Party (PSOE) | Spanish Socialist Workers' Party (PSOE) |
| 8 May | Balearics | Independent (ex-UCD) | People's Coalition (AP–PDP–UL) |
| 8 May | Canary Islands | Spanish Socialist Workers' Party (PSOE) | Spanish Socialist Workers' Party (PSOE) |
| 8 May | Cantabria | People's Coalition (AP–PDP–UL) | People's Coalition (AP–PDP–UL) |
| 8 May | Castile and León | Independent (ex-UCD) | Spanish Socialist Workers' Party (PSOE) |
| 8 May | Castilla–La Mancha | Spanish Socialist Workers' Party (PSOE) | Spanish Socialist Workers' Party (PSOE) |
| 8 May | Extremadura | Spanish Socialist Workers' Party (PSOE) | Spanish Socialist Workers' Party (PSOE) |
| 8 May | La Rioja | Spanish Socialist Workers' Party (PSOE) | Spanish Socialist Workers' Party (PSOE) |
| 8 May | Madrid | Autonomous community established | Spanish Socialist Workers' Party (PSOE) |
| 8 May | Murcia | Spanish Socialist Workers' Party (PSOE) | Spanish Socialist Workers' Party (PSOE) |
| 8 May | Navarre | Independent (ex-UCD) | Spanish Socialist Workers' Party (PSOE) |
| 8 May | Valencian Community | Spanish Socialist Workers' Party (PSOE) | Spanish Socialist Workers' Party (PSOE) |

== May ==
=== Aragon ===
| Parties and alliances | Votes | % | ±pp | Seats | +/− |
|---|---|---|---|---|---|
| PSOE | 283,226 | 46.83 | n/a | 33 | n/a |
| AP–PDP–UL | 136,853 | 22.63 | n/a | 18 | n/a |
| PAR | 124,018 | 20.51 | n/a | 13 | n/a |
| PCE | 23,960 | 3.96 | n/a | 1 | n/a |
| CDS | 19,902 | 3.29 | n/a | 1 | n/a |
| Others | 12,941 | 2.14 | | 0 | ±0 |
| Blank ballots | 3,918 | 0.65 | n/a | | |
| Valid votes | 604,818 | 98.58 | n/a | | |
| Invalid votes | 8,732 | 1.42 | n/a | | |
| Votes cast / turnout | 613,550 | 66.74 | n/a | | |
| Registered voters | 919,295 | | | | |

=== Asturias ===
| Parties and alliances | Votes | % | ±pp | Seats | +/− |
|---|---|---|---|---|---|
| PSOE | 293,320 | 51.96 | n/a | 26 | n/a |
| AP–PDP–UL | 170,654 | 30.23 | n/a | 14 | n/a |
| PCA–PCE | 62,855 | 11.13 | n/a | 5 | n/a |
| CDS | 19,495 | 3.45 | n/a | 0 | n/a |
| Others | 15,898 | 2.82 | | 0 | ±0 |
| Blank ballots | 2,298 | 0.41 | n/a | | |
| Valid votes | 564,520 | 99.34 | n/a | | |
| Invalid votes | 3,751 | 0.66 | n/a | | |
| Votes cast / turnout | 568,271 | 65.04 | n/a | | |
| Registered voters | 873,690 | | | | |

=== Balearics ===
| Parties and alliances | Votes | % | ±pp | Seats | +/− |
|---|---|---|---|---|---|
| AP–PDP–UL | 110,629 | 35.58 | n/a | 21 | n/a |
| PSOE | 107,906 | 34.71 | n/a | 21 | n/a |
| UM | 46,915 | 15.09 | n/a | 6 | n/a |
| PSM–PSI | 16,979 | 5.46 | n/a | 2 | n/a |
| PCIB | 7,669 | 2.47 | n/a | 0 | n/a |
| CDS | 6,611 | 2.13 | n/a | 0 | n/a |
| PDL | 3,896 | 1.25 | n/a | 1 | n/a |
| PSM | 3,732 | 1.20 | n/a | 2 | n/a |
| CIM | 3,250 | 1.05 | n/a | 1 | n/a |
| PCOE | 1,509 | 0.49 | n/a | 0 | n/a |
| Blank ballots | 1,820 | 0.59 | n/a | | |
| Valid votes | 310,916 | 98.46 | n/a | | |
| Invalid votes | 4,879 | 1.54 | n/a | | |
| Votes cast / turnout | 315,795 | 64.67 | n/a | | |
| Registered voters | 488,336 | | | | |

=== Canary Islands ===
| Parties and alliances | Votes | % | ±pp | Seats | +/− |
|---|---|---|---|---|---|
| PSOE | 233,991 | 41.50 | n/a | 27 | n/a |
| AP–PDP–UL | 163,419 | 28.98 | n/a | 17 | n/a |
| UPC–AC | 46,784 | 8.30 | n/a | 2 | n/a |
| CDS | 40,789 | 7.23 | n/a | 6 | n/a |
| PCC | 24,868 | 4.41 | n/a | 1 | n/a |
| CNC | 24,376 | 4.32 | n/a | 1 | n/a |
| PPC | 7,676 | 1.36 | n/a | 0 | n/a |
| AM | 5,551 | 0.98 | n/a | 3 | n/a |
| AGI | 3,294 | 0.58 | n/a | 2 | n/a |
| AHI | 944 | 0.17 | n/a | 1 | n/a |
| Others | 12,130 | 2.15 | | 0 | ±0 |
| Blank ballots | 0 | 0.00 | n/a | | |
| Valid votes | 563,822 | 97.60 | n/a | | |
| Invalid votes | 13,848 | 2.40 | n/a | | |
| Votes cast / turnout | 577,670 | 62.41 | n/a | | |
| Registered voters | 925,572 | | | | |

=== Cantabria ===
| Parties and alliances | Votes | % | ±pp | Seats | +/− |
|---|---|---|---|---|---|
| AP–PDP–UL | 122,748 | 43.99 | n/a | 18 | n/a |
| PSOE | 107,168 | 38.41 | n/a | 15 | n/a |
| PRC | 18,767 | 6.73 | n/a | 2 | n/a |
| PCE | 11,052 | 3.96 | n/a | 0 | n/a |
| CDS | 7,164 | 2.57 | n/a | 0 | n/a |
| PDL | 4,474 | 1.60 | n/a | 0 | n/a |
| AICU | 3,179 | 1.14 | n/a | 0 | n/a |
| Others | 2,888 | 1.04 | | 0 | ±0 |
| Blank ballots | 1,569 | 0.56 | n/a | | |
| Valid votes | 279,009 | 98.52 | n/a | | |
| Invalid votes | 4,188 | 1.48 | n/a | | |
| Votes cast / turnout | 283,197 | 73.56 | n/a | | |
| Registered voters | 384,993 | | | | |

=== Castile and León ===
| Parties and alliances | Votes | % | ±pp | Seats | +/− |
|---|---|---|---|---|---|
| PSOE | 608,604 | 44.37 | n/a | 42 | n/a |
| AP–PDP–UL | 543,851 | 39.65 | n/a | 39 | n/a |
| CDS | 81,741 | 5.96 | n/a | 2 | n/a |
| PCE | 44,357 | 3.23 | n/a | 0 | n/a |
| PDL | 37,301 | 2.72 | n/a | 1 | n/a |
| BAR–PREPAL | 34,398 | 2.51 | n/a | 0 | n/a |
| Others | 8,233 | 0.60 | | 0 | ±0 |
| Blank ballots | 13,103 | 0.96 | n/a | | |
| Valid votes | 1,371,588 | 98.51 | n/a | | |
| Invalid votes | 20,815 | 1.49 | n/a | | |
| Votes cast / turnout | 1,392,403 | 69.84 | n/a | | |
| Registered voters | 1,993,809 | | | | |

=== Castilla–La Mancha ===
| Parties and alliances | Votes | % | ±pp | Seats | +/− |
|---|---|---|---|---|---|
| PSOE | 416,177 | 46.70 | n/a | 23 | n/a |
| AP–PDP–UL | 364,676 | 40.92 | n/a | 21 | n/a |
| PCE | 61,132 | 6.86 | n/a | 0 | n/a |
| CDS | 26,911 | 3.02 | n/a | 0 | n/a |
| PDL | 15,890 | 1.78 | n/a | 0 | n/a |
| PCOE–PCEU | 579 | 0.06 | n/a | 0 | n/a |
| Blank ballots | 5,823 | 0.65 | n/a | | |
| Valid votes | 891,188 | 98.82 | n/a | | |
| Invalid votes | 10,684 | 1.18 | n/a | | |
| Votes cast / turnout | 901,872 | 73.32 | n/a | | |
| Registered voters | 1,230,011 | | | | |

=== Extremadura ===
| Parties and alliances | Votes | % | ±pp | Seats | +/− |
|---|---|---|---|---|---|
| PSOE | 296,939 | 53.02 | n/a | 35 | n/a |
| AP–PDP–UL | 168,606 | 30.10 | n/a | 20 | n/a |
| EU | 47,504 | 8.48 | n/a | 6 | n/a |
| PCE | 36,294 | 6.48 | n/a | 4 | n/a |
| Others | 8,126 | 1.45 | | 0 | ±0 |
| Blank ballots | 2,622 | 0.47 | n/a | | |
| Valid votes | 560,091 | 99.09 | n/a | | |
| Invalid votes | 5,153 | 0.91 | n/a | | |
| Votes cast / turnout | 565,244 | 71.90 | n/a | | |
| Registered voters | 786,200 | | | | |

=== La Rioja ===
| Parties and alliances | Votes | % | ±pp | Seats | +/− |
|---|---|---|---|---|---|
| PSOE | 63,848 | 47.17 | n/a | 18 | n/a |
| AP–PDP–UL | 54,121 | 39.98 | n/a | 15 | n/a |
| PRP | 10,102 | 7.46 | n/a | 2 | n/a |
| CDS | 3,264 | 2.41 | n/a | 0 | n/a |
| PCE | 2,934 | 2.17 | n/a | 0 | n/a |
| Blank ballots | 1,090 | 0.81 | n/a | | |
| Valid votes | 135,359 | 98.83 | n/a | | |
| Invalid votes | 1,605 | 1.17 | n/a | | |
| Votes cast / turnout | 136,964 | 70.24 | n/a | | |
| Registered voters | 194,994 | | | | |

=== Madrid ===
| Parties and alliances | Votes | % | ±pp | Seats | +/− |
|---|---|---|---|---|---|
| PSOE | 1,181,277 | 50.48 | n/a | 51 | n/a |
| AP–PDP–UL | 798,353 | 34.12 | n/a | 34 | n/a |
| PCE | 207,058 | 8.85 | n/a | 9 | n/a |
| CDS | 73,124 | 3.12 | n/a | 0 | n/a |
| PDL | 43,309 | 1.85 | n/a | 0 | n/a |
| Others | 23,269 | 0.99 | | 0 | ±0 |
| Blank ballots | 13,735 | 0.59 | n/a | | |
| Valid votes | 2,340,125 | 99.29 | n/a | | |
| Invalid votes | 16,800 | 0.71 | n/a | | |
| Votes cast / turnout | 2,356,925 | 69.70 | n/a | | |
| Registered voters | 3,381,610 | | | | |

=== Murcia ===
| Parties and alliances | Votes | % | ±pp | Seats | +/− |
|---|---|---|---|---|---|
| PSOE | 238,968 | 52.23 | n/a | 26 | n/a |
| AP–PDP–UL | 162,074 | 35.42 | n/a | 16 | n/a |
| PCE | 32,113 | 7.02 | n/a | 1 | n/a |
| PCAN | 12,967 | 2.83 | n/a | 0 | n/a |
| CDS | 5,224 | 1.14 | n/a | 0 | n/a |
| Others | 3,603 | 0.79 | | 0 | ±0 |
| Blank ballots | 2,608 | 0.57 | n/a | | |
| Valid votes | 457,557 | 98.99 | n/a | | |
| Invalid votes | 4,655 | 1.01 | n/a | | |
| Votes cast / turnout | 462,212 | 68.47 | n/a | | |
| Registered voters | 675,082 | | | | |

=== Navarre ===
| Parties and alliances | Votes | % | ±pp | Seats | +/− |
|---|---|---|---|---|---|
| PSOE | 94,737 | 35.63 | +16.69 | 20 | +5 |
| UPN | 62,072 | 23.34 | +7.35 | 13 | ±0 |
| AP–PDP–UL | 37,554 | 14.12 | New | 8 | +8 |
| HB | 28,055 | 10.55 | −0.53 | 6 | −3 |
| EAJ/PNV | 18,161 | 6.83 | +1.79 | 3 | ±0 |
| Auzolan | 8,356 | 3.14 | +0.44 | 0 | ±0 |
| PC | 6,733 | 2.53 | −2.24 | 0 | −1 |
| EE | 6,292 | 2.37 | −0.54 | 0 | −1 |
| UCD | n/a | n/a | −26.69 | 0 | −20 |
| Amaiur | n/a | n/a | −6.78 | 0 | −7 |
| IFN | n/a | n/a | −1.46 | 0 | −1 |
| Others | 2,121 | 0.80 | | 0 | ±0 |
| Blank ballots | 1,826 | 0.69 | +0.28 | | |
| Valid votes | 265,907 | 98.83 | +0.15 | | |
| Invalid votes | 3,135 | 1.17 | −0.15 | | |
| Votes cast / turnout | 269,042 | 70.86 | +0.10 | | |
| Registered voters | 379,692 | | | | |

=== Valencian Community ===
| Parties and alliances | Votes | % | ±pp | Seats | +/− |
|---|---|---|---|---|---|
| PSOE | 982,567 | 51.41 | n/a | 51 | n/a |
| AP–PDP–UL–UV | 609,519 | 31.89 | n/a | 32 | n/a |
| PCE–PCPV | 142,570 | 7.46 | n/a | 6 | n/a |
| UPV | 58,712 | 3.07 | n/a | 0 | n/a |
| CDS | 36,015 | 1.88 | n/a | 0 | n/a |
| PDL | 29,788 | 1.56 | n/a | 0 | n/a |
| Others | 38,895 | 2.04 | | 0 | ±0 |
| Blank ballots | 13,180 | 0.69 | n/a | | |
| Valid votes | 1,911,246 | 98.97 | n/a | | |
| Invalid votes | 19,896 | 1.03 | n/a | | |
| Votes cast / turnout | 1,931,142 | 72.74 | n/a | | |
| Registered voters | 2,654,967 | | | | |
