= Central District (General Junta of Asturias constituency) =

- General Junta of the Principality of Asturias; Electoral constituency
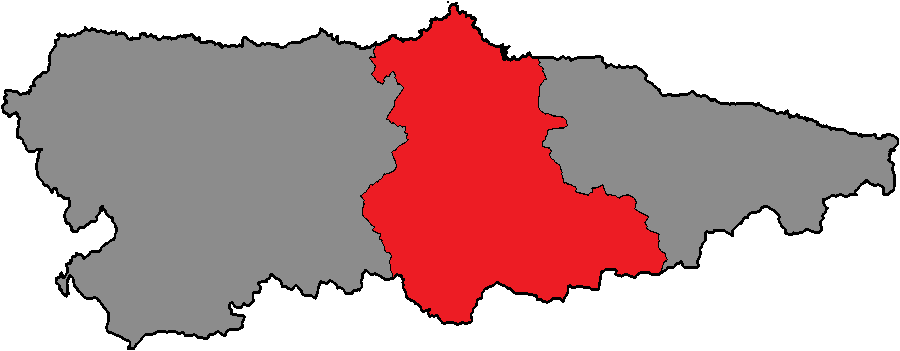
- Location of the Central District within Asturias
- Province: Asturias
- Autonomous community: Principality of Asturias
- Population: 847,177 (2019)
- Electorate: 757,249 (2023)
- Major settlements: Gijón, Oviedo, Avilés, Siero, Langreo, Mieres

Current constituency
- Created: 1983
- Seats: 32 (1983–1995); 33 (1995–2007); 34 (2007–present)
- Members: PSOE (13); PP (12); Vox (4); IU–MP–IAS (3); Podemos Asturies (1); Foro (1)

Central District is one of the three constituencies (Spanish: circunscripciones) represented in the General Junta of the Principality of Asturias, the regional legislature of the Principality of Asturias. The constituency currently elects 34 deputies. It comprises the municipalities of Aller, Avilés, Bimenes, Carreño, Caso, Castrillón, Corvera de Asturias, Gijón, Gozón, Illas, Las Regueras, Langreo, Laviana, Lena, Llanera, Mieres, Morcín, Noreña, Oviedo, Proaza, Quirós, Ribera de Arriba, Riosa, San Martín del Rey Aurelio, Santo Adriano, Sariego, Siero, Sobrescobio and Soto del Barco. The electoral system uses the D'Hondt method and closed-list proportional representation, with a minimum threshold of three percent.

== Electoral system ==
The constituency was created as per the Statute of Autonomy for Asturias of 1981 and was first contested in the 1983 regional election. The Statute provided for sub-provincial divisions of the Principality's territory to be established as multi-member districts in the General Junta of the Principality of Asturias, with this regulation being maintained under the 1986 regional electoral law. Each constituency is entitled to an initial minimum of two seats, with the remaining 39 being distributed in proportion to their populations. The exception was the 1983 election, when each constituency was allocated a fixed number of seats: 32 for the Central District, 5 for the Eastern District and 8 for the Western District.

Voting is on the basis of universal suffrage, which comprises all nationals over eighteen, registered in Asturias and in full enjoyment of their political rights. Amendments to the electoral law in 2011 required for Asturians abroad to apply for voting before being permitted to vote, a system known as "begged" or expat vote (Spanish: Voto rogado) which was abolished in 2022. Seats are elected using the D'Hondt method and a closed list proportional representation, with a threshold of three percent of valid votes—which includes blank ballots—being applied in each constituency. The only exception was in 1983, when a five percent threshold was applied regionally. Parties not reaching the threshold are not taken into consideration for seat distribution. The use of the D'Hondt method might result in a higher effective threshold, depending on the district magnitude.

The electoral law allows for parties and federations registered in the interior ministry, coalitions and groupings of electors to present lists of candidates. Parties and federations intending to form a coalition ahead of an election are required to inform the relevant Electoral Commission within ten days of the election call—fifteen before 1985—whereas groupings of electors need to secure the signature of at least one percent of the electorate in the constituencies for which they seek election—one-thousandth of the electorate, with a compulsory minimum of 500 signatures, until 1985—disallowing electors from signing for more than one list of candidates.

== Deputies ==
Deputies 1983–present
Key to parties PCA–PCE IU IU–MP–IAS Podemos Podemos Asturies PSOE PAS UPyD CDS Cs URAS Foro PP CP AP FAC Vox
Junta	Election	Distribution
1st	1983	4 / 19 / 9
2nd	1987	4 / 13 / 7 / 8
3rd	1991	6 / 13 / 1 / 2 / 10
4th	1995	6 / 11 / 1 / 15
5th	1999	3 / 17 / 2 / 11
6th	2003	4 / 15 / 14
7th	2007	4 / 15 / 15
8th	2011	4 / 11 / 7 / 12
9th	2012	5 / 12 / 1 / 7 / 9
10th	2015	5 / 7 / 9 / 3 / 7 / 3
11th	2019	2 / 4 / 13 / 5 / 6 / 2 / 2
12th	2023	3 / 1 / 13 / 1 / 12 / 4

== Regional elections ==
=== 2023 ===
Summary of the 28 May 2023 General Junta of Asturias election results in the Central District
Parties and alliances	Popular vote			Seats	
Parties and alliances	Votes	%	±pp	Total	+/−
Spanish Socialist Workers' Party (PSOE)	157,852	36.25	+2.35	13	±0
People's Party (PP)	139,012	31.92	+15.85	12	+6
Vox (Vox)	46,452	10.67	+3.83	4	+2
Assembly for Asturias United Left–More Country–Asturian Left (IU–MP–IAS)^{1}	35,588	8.17	+1.02	3	+1
We Can Asturias (Podemos Asturies)	18,937	4.35	–7.47	1	–3
Asturias Forum (Foro)	14,022	3.22	–3.28	1	–1
Citizens–Party of the Citizenry (CS)	4,333	1.00	–13.92	0	–5
Animalist Party with the Environment (PACMA)^{2}	2,990	0.69	–0.10	0	±0
SOS Asturias–Empty Spain (SOS Asturias)	2,848	0.65	New	0	±0
Greens–Equo Asturias (V–Q)	1,717	0.39	–0.06	0	±0
Communist Party of the Workers of Spain (PCTE)	1,197	0.27	+0.06	0	±0
Andecha Astur (Andecha)	1,066	0.24	–0.08	0	±0
Unite Principality (SMP)	981	0.23	New	0	±0
For a Fairer World (PUM+J)	665	0.15	New	0	±0
State of Spain Unionist Party (PUEDE)	236	0.05	New	0	±0
Blank ballots	7,579	1.72	+0.70		
Total	435,475			34	±0
Valid votes	435,475	98.62	–0.60		
Invalid votes	6,083	1.38	+0.60		
Votes cast / turnout	441,558	58.31	+1.84		
Abstentions	315,691	41.69	–1.84		
Registered voters	757,249				
Sources
Footnotes: ^{1} Assembly for Asturias United Left–More Country–Asturian Left results are compared to United Left–Asturian Left: Asturias by the Left totals in the 2019 election.; ^{2} Animalist Party with the Environment results are compared to Animalist Party Against Mistreatment of Animals totals in the 2019 election.

=== 2019 ===
Summary of the 26 May 2019 General Junta of Asturias election results in the Central District
Parties and alliances	Popular vote			Seats	
Parties and alliances	Votes	%	±pp	Total	+/−
Spanish Socialist Workers' Party (PSOE)	146,201	33.90	+9.31	13	+4
People's Party (PP)	69,314	16.07	–4.32	6	–1
Citizens–Party of the Citizenry (Cs)	64,338	14.92	+6.97	5	+2
We Can Asturias (Podemos Asturies)	50,964	11.82	–8.48	4	–3
United Left–Asturian Left: Asturias by the Left (IU–IAS)	30,851	7.15	–5.94	2	–3
Vox (Vox)	29,503	6.84	+6.11	2	+2
Forum of Citizens (FAC)	28,024	6.50	–1.28	2	–1
Animalist Party Against Mistreatment of Animals (PACMA)	3,426	0.79	–0.01	0	±0
Greens–Equo (V–Q)	1,926	0.45	+0.05	0	±0
Andecha Astur (Andecha)	1,363	0.32	+0.12	0	±0
Communist Party of the Workers of Spain (PCTE)	914	0.21	New	0	±0
Blank ballots	4,414	1.02	–0.77		
Total	431,238			34	±0
Valid votes	431,238	99.22	+0.50		
Invalid votes	3,376	0.78	–0.50		
Votes cast / turnout	434,614	56.47	–0.71		
Abstentions	335,086	43.53	+0.71		
Registered voters	769,700				

=== 2015 ===
Summary of the 24 May 2015 General Junta of Asturias election results in the Central District
Parties and alliances	Popular vote			Seats	
Parties and alliances	Votes	%	±pp	Total	+/−
Spanish Socialist Workers' Party (PSOE)	108,202	24.59	–6.66	9	–3
People's Party (PP)	89,692	20.39	–0.23	7	±0
We Can (Podemos)	89,291	20.30	New	7	+7
United Left of Asturias (IU/IX)	57,587	13.09	–1.94	5	±0
Citizens–Party of the Citizenry (C's)	34,964	7.95	New	3	+3
Forum of Citizens (FAC)	34,248	7.78	–16.84	3	–6
Union, Progress and Democracy (UPyD)	3,942	0.90	–3.30	0	–1
Animalist Party Against Mistreatment of Animals (PACMA)	3,516	0.80	+0.49	0	±0
Vox (Vox)	3,226	0.73	New	0	±0
Blank Seats (EB)	3,081	0.70	–0.22	0	±0
Equo (Equo)	1,751	0.40	–0.15	0	±0
Andecha Astur (Andecha)	878	0.20	+0.06	0	±0
Communist Party of the Peoples of Spain (PCPE)	728	0.17	±0.00	0	±0
Citizens' Democratic Renewal Movement (RED)	364	0.08	New	0	±0
Zero Cuts (Recortes Cero)	354	0.08	New	0	±0
Republican Social Movement (MSR)	264	0.06	+0.02	0	±0
Asturian Renewal Union (URAS)	0	0.00	–0.05	0	±0
Spanish Phalanx of the CNSO (FE–JONS)	0	0.00	New	0	±0
Humanist Party (PH)	0	0.00	New	0	±0
Blank ballots	7,858	1.79	+0.35		
Total	439,946			34	±0
Valid votes	439,946	98.72	–0.52		
Invalid votes	5,685	1.28	+0.52		
Votes cast / turnout	445,631	57.18	+4.47		
Abstentions	333,751	42.82	–4.47		
Registered voters	779,382				

=== 2012 ===
Summary of the 25 March 2012 General Junta of Asturias election results in the Central District
Parties and alliances	Popular vote			Seats	
Parties and alliances	Votes	%	±pp	Total	+/−
Spanish Socialist Workers' Party (PSOE)	127,849	31.25	+2.89	12	+1
Forum of Citizens (FAC)	100,720	24.62	–5.48	9	–3
People's Party (PP)	84,360	20.62	+1.50	7	±0
United Left of Asturias (IU/IX)	61,498	15.03	+3.86	5	+1
Union, Progress and Democracy (UPyD)	17,186	4.20	+1.33	1	+1
Blank Seats (EB)	3,757	0.92	New	0	±0
Equo–The Greens of Asturias (Equo–LV)	2,239	0.55	New	0	±0
Commitment for Asturias (BA–UNA–LV–GV)^{1}	1,497	0.37	–1.45	0	±0
Animalist Party Against Mistreatment of Animals (PACMA)	1,279	0.31	–0.04	0	±0
Independents of Asturias–Hartos.org (IDEAS–Hartos.org)	703	0.17	–1.02	0	±0
Communist Party of the Peoples of Spain (PCPE)	688	0.17	–0.09	0	±0
Andecha Astur (Andecha)	588	0.14	New	0	±0
Asturian Renewal Union (URAS)^{2}	222	0.05	–0.46	0	±0
Democratic and Constitutional Party (PDyC)	198	0.05	–0.12	0	±0
Internationalist Solidarity and Self-Management (SAIn)	178	0.04	New	0	±0
Republican Social Movement (MSR)	167	0.04	–0.01	0	±0
Communist Unification of Spain (UCE)	84	0.02	New	0	±0
Blank ballots	5,910	1.44	–1.26		
Total	409,123			34	±0
Valid votes	409,123	99.24	+0.67		
Invalid votes	3,142	0.76	–0.67		
Votes cast / turnout	412,265	52.71	–9.53		
Abstentions	369,824	47.79	+9.53		
Registered voters	782,089				
Sources
Footnotes: ^{1} Commitment for Asturias results are compared to the combined totals of Bloc for Asturias–Asturian Nationalist Unity: Commitment for Asturias and The Greens–Green Group in the 2011 election.; ^{2} Asturian Renewal Union results are compared to Asturian Renewal Union–Asturianist Party totals in the 2011 election.

=== 2011 ===
Summary of the 22 May 2011 General Junta of Asturias election results in the Central District
Parties and alliances	Popular vote			Seats	
Parties and alliances	Votes	%	±pp	Total	+/−
Forum of Citizens (FAC)	144,119	30.10	New	12	+12
Spanish Socialist Workers' Party (PSOE)	135,744	28.36	–11.82	11	–4
People's Party (PP)	91,520	19.12	–22.92	7	–8
United Left of Asturias–The Greens (IU–LV)	53,486	11.17	+0.56	4	±0
Union, Progress and Democracy (UPyD)	13,733	2.87	New	0	±0
Independents of Asturias (IDEAS)	5,715	1.19	New	0	±0
Bloc for Asturias–Asturian Nationalist Unity: Commitment for Asturias (BA–UNA)	5,569	1.16	New	0	±0
Left Front (FDLI)	4,207	0.88	New	0	±0
The Greens–Green Group (LV–GV)	3,161	0.66	New	0	±0
Asturian Renewal Union–Asturianist Party (URAS–PAS)	2,460	0.51	–1.82	0	±0
Anti-Bullfighting Party Against Mistreatment of Animals (PACMA)	1,675	0.35	New	0	±0
Communist Party of the Peoples of Spain (PCPE)	1,268	0.26	–0.11	0	±0
Open Council (Conceyu Abiertu)	1,200	0.25	New	0	±0
Constitutional and Democratic Party (PDyC)	810	0.17	New	0	±0
National Democracy (DN)	634	0.13	–0.02	0	±0
Liberal and Social Alternative (ALS)	265	0.06	New	0	±0
National Front–Republican Social Movement (FrN–MSR)	260	0.05	New	0	±0
Blank ballots	12,903	2.70	+0.12		
Total	478,729			34	±0
Valid votes	478,729	98.57	–0.69		
Invalid votes	6,947	1.43	+0.69		
Votes cast / turnout	485,676	62.24	+1.45		
Abstentions	294,664	37.76	–1.45		
Registered voters	780,340				

=== 2007 ===
Summary of the 27 May 2007 General Junta of Asturias election results in the Central District
Parties and alliances	Popular vote			Seats	
Parties and alliances	Votes	%	±pp	Total	+/−
People's Party (PP)	197,089	42.01	+3.09	15	+1
Spanish Socialist Workers' Party (PSOE)	188,510	40.18	+0.91	15	±0
United Left–Bloc for Asturias–The Greens of Asturias (IU–BA–LV)^{1}	49,756	10.61	–2.97	4	±0
Asturian Renewal Union–Asturianist Party (URAS–PAS)^{2}	10,952	2.33	–2.13	0	±0
Unity (Unidá)	3,408	0.73	New	0	±0
Andecha Astur (AA)	2,350	0.50	–0.14	0	±0
Communist Party of the Peoples of Spain (PCPE)	1,748	0.37	+0.17	0	±0
Republican Left (IR)	1,428	0.30	New	0	±0
National Democracy (DN)	686	0.15	New	0	±0
Asturian Council (Conceyu)	636	0.14	+0.03	0	±0
Asturian Democratic Convergence (CDAS)	453	0.10	+0.03	0	±0
Blank ballots	12,095	2.58	+0.14		
Total	469,111			34	+1
Valid votes	469,111	99.26	–0.09		
Invalid votes	3,493	0.74	+0.09		
Votes cast / turnout	472,604	60.79	–2.57		
Abstentions	304,844	39.21	+2.57		
Registered voters	777,448				
Sources
Footnotes: ^{1} United Left–Bloc for Asturias–The Greens of Asturias results are compared to the combined totals of United Left–Bloc for Asturias and The Greens–Green Left of Asturias in the 2003 election.; ^{2} Asturian Renewal Union–Asturianist Party results are compared to the combined totals of Asturian Renewal Union and Asturianist Party in the 2003 election.

=== 2003 ===
Summary of the 25 May 2003 General Junta of Asturias election results in the Central District
Parties and alliances	Popular vote			Seats	
Parties and alliances	Votes	%	±pp	Total	+/−
Spanish Socialist Workers' Party (PSOE)	190,249	39.27	–7.03	15	–2
People's Party (PP)	188,565	38.92	+7.20	14	+3
United Left–Bloc for Asturias (IU–BA)	59,871	12.36	+2.13	4	+1
Asturian Renewal Union (URAS)	11,756	2.43	–3.44	0	–2
Asturianist Party (PAS)	9,829	2.03	–0.66	0	±0
The Greens–Green Left of Asturias (LV–IVA)	5,898	1.22	+0.63	0	±0
Andecha Astur (AA)	3,077	0.64	+0.28	0	±0
Communist Party of the Peoples of Spain (PCPE)^{1}	987	0.20	–0.04	0	±0
Senior Defense Platform (PlaDeTE)	872	0.18	New	0	±0
Democratic and Social Centre (CDS)	642	0.13	–0.02	0	±0
Asturian Council (Conceyu)	524	0.11	+0.01	0	±0
Asturian Democratic Convergence (CDAS)	359	0.07	New	0	±0
Blank ballots	11,844	2.44	+0.78		
Total	484,473			33	±0
Valid votes	484,473	99.35	–0.15		
Invalid votes	3,159	0.65	+0.15		
Votes cast / turnout	487,632	63.36	+0.21		
Abstentions	281,936	36.64	–0.21		
Registered voters	769,568				
Sources
Footnotes: ^{1} Communist Party of the Peoples of Spain results are compared to Asturian Left Bloc totals in the 1995 election.

=== 1999 ===
Summary of the 13 June 1999 General Junta of Asturias election results in the Central District
Parties and alliances	Popular vote			Seats	
Parties and alliances	Votes	%	±pp	Total	+/−
Spanish Socialist Workers' Party (PSOE)	224,710	46.30	+14.95	17	+6
People's Party (PP)	153,940	31.72	–10.28	11	–4
United Left of Asturias (IU)	49,659	10.23	–8.38	3	–3
Asturian Renewal Union (URAS)	28,476	5.87	New	2	+2
Asturianist Party (PAS)	13,045	2.69	–0.83	0	–1
The Greens of Asturias (LV)	2,866	0.59	–0.18	0	±0
Andecha Astur (AA)	1,755	0.36	+0.03	0	±0
Asturian Left Bloc (BIA)^{1}	1,170	0.24	+0.07	0	±0
Centrist Union–Democratic and Social Centre (UC–CDS)	737	0.15	–1.39	0	±0
Asturian Council (Conceyu)	496	0.10	–0.07	0	±0
The Phalanx (FE)	382	0.08	New	0	±0
Blank ballots	8,047	1.66	+0.44		
Total	485,283			33	±0
Valid votes	485,283	99.50	+0.04		
Invalid votes	2,455	0.50	–0.04		
Votes cast / turnout	487,738	63.15	–5.83		
Abstentions	284,641	36.85	+5.83		
Registered voters	772,379				
Sources
Footnotes: ^{1} Asturian Left Bloc results are compared to Communist Party of the Peoples of Spain totals in the 1995 election.

=== 1995 ===
Summary of the 28 May 1995 General Junta of Asturias election results in the Central District
Parties and alliances	Popular vote			Seats	
Parties and alliances	Votes	%	±pp	Total	+/−
People's Party (PP)	215,265	42.00	+12.58	15	+5
Spanish Socialist Workers' Party (PSOE)	160,691	31.35	–7.80	11	–2
United Left (IU)	95,383	18.61	+1.53	6	±0
Asturianist Party (PAS)^{1}	18,021	3.52	+0.39	1	±0
Asturian Centre–Democratic and Social Centre (CA–CDS)	7,918	1.54	–4.90	0	–2
The Greens of Asturias (LV)	3,943	0.77	–0.80	0	±0
Andecha Astur (AA)	1,707	0.33	+0.11	0	±0
Asturian League (LA)	1,623	0.32	New	0	±0
Asturian Council (Conceyu)	862	0.17	–0.25	0	±0
Communist Party of the Peoples of Spain (PCPE)	859	0.17	–0.17	0	±0
Blank ballots	6,271	1.22	–0.09		
Total	512,543			33	+1
Valid votes	512,543	99.46	+0.19		
Invalid votes	2,792	0.54	–0.19		
Votes cast / turnout	515,335	68.98	+11.57		
Abstentions	231,778	31.02	–11.57		
Registered voters	747,113				
Sources
Footnotes: ^{1} Asturianist Party results are compared to Asturian Coalition totals in the 1991 election.

=== 1991 ===
Summary of the 26 May 1991 General Junta of Asturias election results in the Central District
Parties and alliances	Popular vote			Seats	
Parties and alliances	Votes	%	±pp	Total	+/−
Spanish Socialist Workers' Party (PSOE)	158,492	39.15	+2.12	13	±0
People's Party (PP)^{1}	119,095	29.42	+5.34	10	+2
United Left (IU)	69,138	17.08	+3.46	6	+2
Democratic and Social Centre (CDS)	26,091	6.44	–13.47	2	–5
Asturian Coalition (PAS–UNA)^{2}	12,672	3.13	+1.63	1	+1
The Greens (LV)	6,371	1.57	New	0	±0
Gijonese Garments Workers (TGC)	2,444	0.60	New	0	±0
Independent Council of Asturias (Conceyu)	1,701	0.42	New	0	±0
Communist Party of the Peoples of Spain (PCPE)	1,385	0.34	New	0	±0
Asturian People's Union (UPA)	1,263	0.31	New	0	±0
Andecha Astur (AA)	908	0.22	New	0	±0
Blank ballots	5,318	1.31	–0.05		
Total	404,878			32	±0
Valid votes	404,878	99.27	+0.68		
Invalid votes	2,982	0.73	–0.68		
Votes cast / turnout	407,860	57.41	–9.34		
Abstentions	302,634	42.59	+9.34		
Registered voters	710,494				
Sources
Footnotes: ^{1} People's Party results are compared to the combined totals of People's Alliance and People's Democratic Party in the 1987 election.; ^{2} Asturian Coalition results are compared to Asturianist Party totals in the 1987 election.

=== 1987 ===
Summary of the 10 June 1987 General Junta of Asturias election results in the Central District
Parties and alliances	Popular vote			Seats	
Parties and alliances	Votes	%	±pp	Total	+/−
Spanish Socialist Workers' Party (PSOE)	164,555	37.03	–17.51	13	–6
People's Alliance (AP)^{1}	104,917	23.61	–4.04	8	–1
Democratic and Social Centre (CDS)	88,464	19.91	+16.93	7	+7
United Left (IU)^{2}	60,514	13.62	+2.05	4	±0
Asturianist Party (PAS)	6,649	1.50	New	0	±0
Workers' Party of Spain–Communist Unity (PTE–UC)	4,875	1.10	New	0	±0
Asturian Nationalist Ensame (ENA)	2,456	0.55	+0.10	0	±0
People's Democratic Party (PDP)	2,106	0.47	New	0	±0
Workers' Socialist Party (PST)	1,849	0.42	–0.42	0	±0
Humanist Platform (PH)	972	0.22	New	0	±0
Spanish Phalanx of the CNSO (FE–JONS)	957	0.22	New	0	±0
Blank ballots	6,046	1.36	+0.98		
Total	444,360			32	±0
Valid votes	444,360	98.59	–0.82		
Invalid votes	6,353	1.41	+0.82		
Votes cast / turnout	450,713	66.75	+0.38		
Abstentions	224,510	33.25	–0.38		
Registered voters	675,223				
Sources
Footnotes: ^{1} People's Alliance results are compared to People's Coalition totals in the 1983 election.; ^{2} United Left results are compared to Communist Party of Asturias totals in the 1983 election.

=== 1983 ===
Summary of the 8 May 1983 General Junta of Asturias election results in the Central District
Parties and alliances	Popular vote			Seats	
Parties and alliances	Votes	%	±pp	Total	+/−
Spanish Socialist Workers' Party (PSOE)	238,885	54.54	n/a	19	n/a
People's Coalition (AP–PDP–UL)	121,108	27.65	n/a	9	n/a
Communist Party of Asturias (PCA–PCE)	50,693	11.57	n/a	4	n/a
Democratic and Social Centre (CDS)	13,052	2.98	n/a	0	n/a
Workers' Socialist Party (PST)	3,668	0.84	n/a	0	n/a
Communist Candidacy (PRUC–PCPE)	3,436	0.78	n/a	0	n/a
Asturian Left (MC–LCR)	2,170	0.50	n/a	0	n/a
Asturian Nationalist Ensame (ENA)	1,988	0.45	n/a	0	n/a
Youth Students and Workers (MEyT)	764	0.17	n/a	0	n/a
Popular Struggle Coalition (CLP)	580	0.13	n/a	0	n/a
Blank ballots	1,662	0.38	n/a		
Total	438,006			32	n/a
Valid votes	438,006	99.41	n/a		
Invalid votes	2,617	0.59	n/a		
Votes cast / turnout	440,623	66.37	n/a		
Abstentions	223,311	33.63	n/a		
Registered voters	663,934				
