= Antonio Landeta y Álvarez-Valdés =

Spanish politician (1936–2026)

Antonio Landeta y Álvarez-Valdés (30 November 1936 – 29 August 2026) was a Spanish politician. In 1993 he was elected to the national parliament, the Congress of Deputies for Asturias district which he represented until 2000. He was the president of the General Junta of the Principality of Asturias.

Landeta y Álvarez-Valdés died on 29 August 2026, at the age of 89.
