= General Junta of the Principality of Asturias =

Legislative body of the Spanish region of Asturias

Coordinates: 43°21′41″N 05°50′52″W

General Junta of the Principality of Asturias Junta General del Principado de Asturias (Spanish) Xunta Xeneral del Principáu d'Asturies (Asturian)
- 12th General Junta

Type
- Type: Spanish regional legislature
- Houses: Unicameral

Leadership
- President: Juan Cofiño, FSA–PSOE since 26 June 2023
- Vice President: María Celia Fernández Fernández, FSA–PSOE since 24 June 2019
- Second Vice President: Pablo Álvarez-Pire Santiago, PP since 24 June 2019
- Secretary: Ovidio Zapico, CxAst since 24 June 2019

Structure
- Seats: 45
- Political groups: Government (22): FSA–PSOE (19); CxAst (3) (Note: IU/IX (2); SMR (1)); Supported by (1): Independent (1) (Note: Covadonga Tomé was expelled from Podemos in 2023.); Opposition (22): PP (17); Vox (4); Foro (1)

Elections
- Voting system: Closed party list in three constituencies with seats allocated using the D'Hondt method
- First election: 8 May 1983
- Last election: 28 May 2023

Meeting place
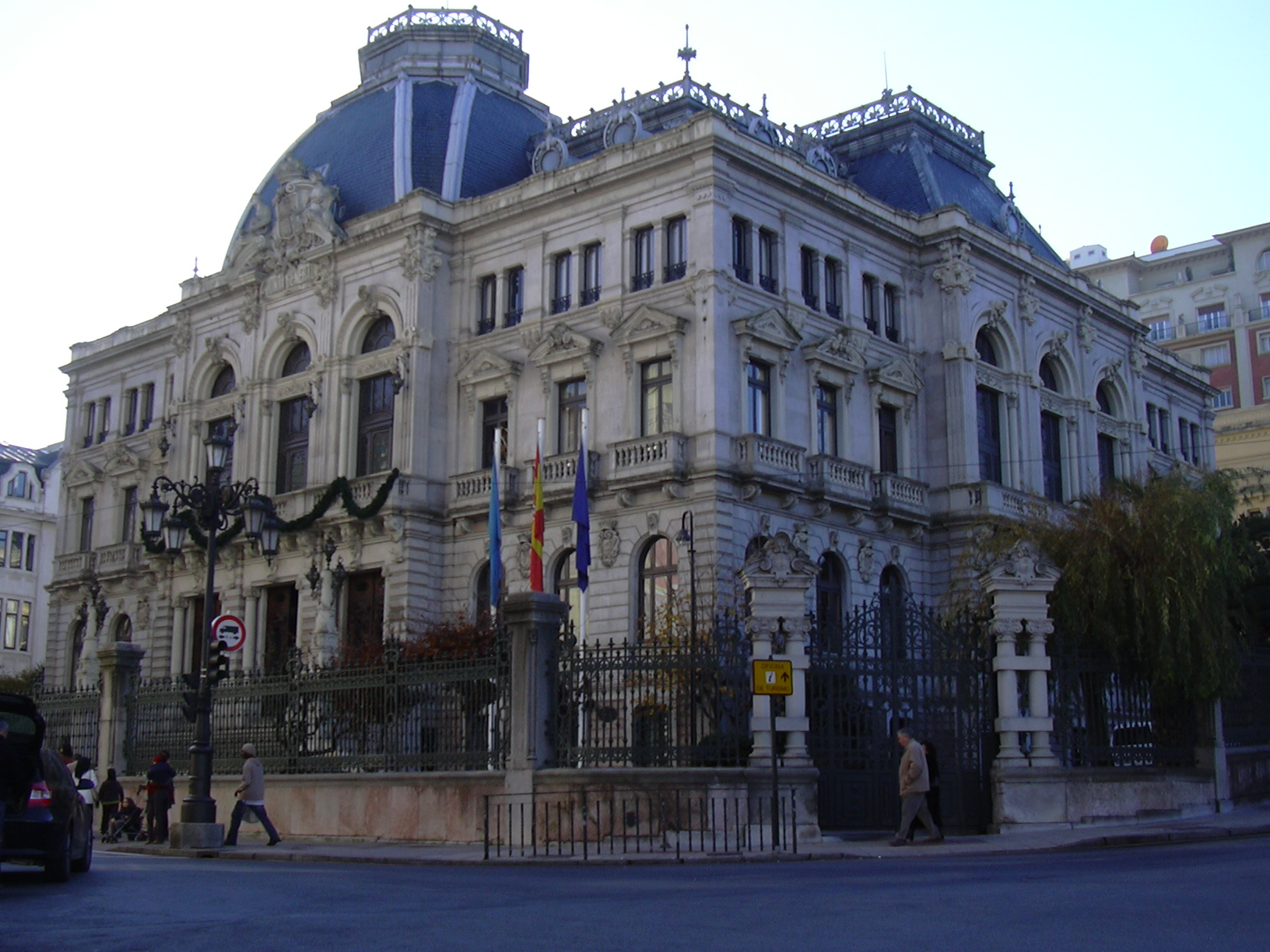
- Regional Palace, Oviedo

Website
- www.jgpa.es

The General Junta of the Principality of Asturias (Spanish: Junta General del Principado de Asturias, Asturian: Xunta Xeneral del Principáu d'Asturies) is the parliament of Asturias, an autonomous community of Spain. Its Statute of Autonomy, the basic organic law of the community, defines it as the supreme institution of representation of the Asturian people.

Established in its current form in 1982, the General Junta is named after an Asturian political institution that existed from the Middle Ages to the 19th century. The General Junta exercises legislative power, approves the budgets of the community, and holds to account the Council of Government, the executive branch, whose leader it elects as the "President of the Principality of Asturias". It also exercises all competences conferred or devolved to the autonomous communities in the Constitution of Spain and assumed by the community itself in its Statute of Autonomy and any other relevant law.

The General Junta is made up of 45 members called "deputies" (diputados) elected every four years, though the President of the Principality may dissolve the parliament and trigger early elections. The General Junta meets at the Regional Palace in Oviedo.

== Election ==
The election is in three electoral districts. 34 members are returned for the Central district, which contains Avilés, Gijón and Oviedo, the three largest municipalities, and in total represents 888,293 people in 2010. Six members are returned for the Western district (121,903 people) and five for the Eastern district (73,511 people). A threshold of the 3% is established for having any seats.

== Presidents of the General Junta ==
The President of the General Junta of the Principality of Asturias is the presiding officer of that legislature.

Name	Term of office			Legislature (election)	Political Party
Name	Took office	Left office	Days	Legislature (election)	Political Party
Agustín José Antuña Alonso	6 March 1982	14 January 1983	314	Provisional	Union of the Democratic Centre
Eugenio Carbajal Martínez	14 January 1983	31 May 1983	137	Provisional	Asturian Socialist Federation
Juan Ramón Zapico García	31 May 1983	8 July 1987	1499	I (1983)	Asturian Socialist Federation
Antonio Landeta y Álvarez-Valdés	8 July 1987	21 June 1991	1444	II (1987)	People's Alliance
Antonio Landeta y Álvarez-Valdés	8 July 1987	21 June 1991	1444	II (1987)	People's Party
Laura González Álvarez	21 June 1991	8 January 1993	567	III (1991)	United Left of Asturias
Eugenio Carbajal Martínez	4 March 1993	23 June 1995	841	III (1991)	Asturian Socialist Federation
Ovidio Sánchez Díaz	23 June 1995	5 March 1999	1351	IV (1995)	People's Party
Faustino González Alcalde	18 March 1999	7 July 1999	111	IV (1995)	Asturian Socialist Federation
María Jesús Álvarez González	7 July 1999	17 June 2003	4361	V (1999)	Asturian Socialist Federation
María Jesús Álvarez González	17 June 2003	21 July 2007	4361	VI (2003)	Asturian Socialist Federation
María Jesús Álvarez González	21 July 2007	15 June 2011	4361	VII (2007)	Asturian Socialist Federation
Fernando Goñi Merino	15 June 2011	27 April 2012	317	VIII (2011)	People's Party
Pedro Sanjurjo González	27 April 2012	16 June 2015	1145	IX (2012)	Asturian Socialist Federation
Pedro Sanjurjo González	16 June 2015	24 June 2019	1145	X (2015)	Asturian Socialist Federation
Marcelino Marcos Líndez	24 June 2019	Incumbent	2637	XI (2019)	Asturian Socialist Federation

=== Results of the elections to the General Junta of the Principality of Asturias ===
Deputies in the General Junta of the Principality of Asturias since 1983
Key to parties Podemos PCE IU FAC PSOE UPyD UCD Cs CDS CD PP CP AP Vox
Election	Distribution	President
1983	5 / 26 / 14	Pedro de Silva (PSOE)
1987	4 / 20 / 8 / 13	Pedro de Silva (PSOE)
1991	6 / 1 / 21 / 2 / 15	Juan Luis Rodríguez-Vigil (PSOE) (1991-1993) Antonio Trevín (PSOE) (1993-1995)
1995	6 / 1 / 17 / 21	Sergio Marqués (PP 1995-1998; URAS 1998-1999)
1999	3 / 24 / 3 / 15	Vicente Álvarez Areces (PSOE)
2003	4 / 22 / 19	Vicente Álvarez Areces (PSOE)
2007	4 / 21 / 20	Vicente Álvarez Areces (PSOE)
2011	4 / 15 / 16 / 10	Francisco Álvarez-Cascos (FAC)
2012	5 / 17 / 1 / 12 / 10	Javier Fernández (PSOE)
2015	5 / 9 / 14 / 3 / 3 / 11	Javier Fernández (PSOE)
2019	2 / 4 / 20 / 5 / 2 / 10 / 2	Adrián Barbón (PSOE)
2023	3 / 1 / 19 / 1 / 17 / 4	Adrián Barbón (PSOE)

== Sources ==
- Official website
- All members of the General Junta
