= Alejandro Rebollo Álvarez-Amandi =

Spanish politician (1934–2015)

Member of the Congress of Deputies
- In office 15 July 1986 – 29 June 1993

Personal details
- Born: 5 November 1934 Madrid, Spain
- Died: 11 March 2015 (aged 80) Madrid, Spain
- Party: Union of the Democratic Centre, Democratic and Social Centre
- Education: University of Oviedo

Alejandro Rebollo Álvarez-Amandi (5 November 1934 – 11 March 2015) was a Spanish politician, civil servant and lawyer. He was Secretary General and later president of Spanish train operator Renfe in the 1970s and early 1980s. He also worked for post service Correos, serving as its director general between 1977 and 1978. Rebollo was a member of the Congress of Deputies for Asturias in Legislatures III (1986–1989) and IV (1989–1993) for the Democratic and Social Centre.

== Career ==
Rebollo was born in Madrid in 1934 but had close links to Oviedo where his mother was born and his father worked for the municipality. He studied law at the University of Oviedo and graduated in 1956. He became part of the Cuerpo de Intervención General of the Spanish Army against his will and later in the Técnicos Fiscales del Estado. In 1963 Rebollo as an Army captain was the lawyer of Julián Grimau when the latter was accused of leading the Communist Party of Spain and military rebellion during Francoist Spain. During the defense Rebollo showed several inconsistencies in the prosecutor's story but Grimau was convicted and executed. Several decades after the trial Rebollo pleaded for the rehabilitation of the integrity of Grimau. He furthermore stated that he took up the defense as part of his duties as a military man, Christian and lawyer. Czechoslovakia honored Rebollo by naming a street in Prague after him. In 1970 he was the Spanish representative in the International Congress for Civil Law.

Rebollo took up several positions as civil servant administrator. In 1973 Rebollo became Secretary General of Spanish train operator Renfe, a position which he kept until 1976. Between 1976 and 1977 he was director general of Vivienda. He was director general of state-owned post service Correos between 1977 and 1978. Rebollo subsequently became Sub-secretary for Transport and Communication and stayed in this position until 1980. He then returned to Renfe, where was president until 1982. He became known as a vigorous defender of the proposed rail-line Variante de Pajares which would link central Spain with his home community of Asturias.

In 1983 he worked as a lawyer for the holding company Rumasa when it was nationalized by the Spanish government on 23 February.

Rebollo was an active member of the political party Union of the Democratic Centre (UCD) and when that party fractured in the early 1980s he became one of the founders of the Democratic and Social Centre party in 1982. He was the president of the party in Asturias and also served as its Deputy in the Congress for the Legislatures III (1986–1989) and IV (1989–1993).

Adolfo Barthe Aza, a former member of the UCD, stated that Rebollo was not content with the status of Spanish politics in later years, and that he planned a re-entry into politics in Asturias in 2007 but later changed his mind.

== Personal life ==
Rebollo was considered to be the right-hand man of Spanish Prime Minister Adolfo Suárez and friend of Spanish Kings Juan Carlos I and Felipe VI. He was married and had five children. His brother José Luis Rebollo was the anti-drugs prosecutor of Asturias.

Rebollo received the Order of Civil Merit, the Cross of Military Merit and the Gran Plaque of the Order of Postal Merit.

Rebollo suffered from Alzheimer's disease. He died on 11 March 2015 in Madrid, aged 80.
