= Ignacio Blanco =

Spanish politician, lawyer and economist

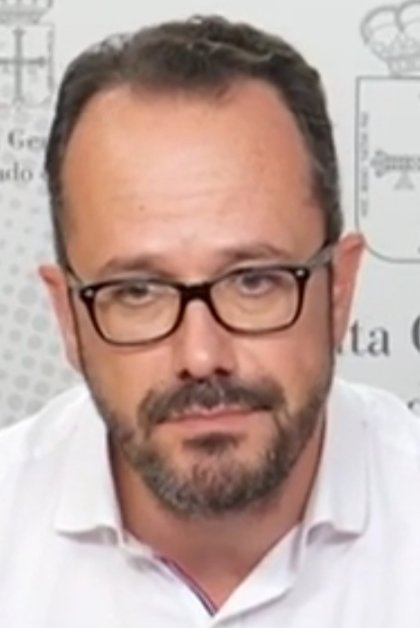

Member of the General Junta of the Principality of Asturias
- Incumbent
- Assumed office 26 May 2019

Personal details
- Born: 17 May 1971 (age 55) Gijón, Spain
- Party: Vox
- Education: University of Oviedo; University of Wisconsin

Ignacio Blanco Urizar (born 17 May 1971) is a Spanish politician, lawyer and economist. He has been a member of the General Junta of the Principality of Asturias since 2019 for the Vox party.

== Biography ==
Blanco is a native of Gijón and grew up in the Natahoyo district of the city. He studied business management at the University of Oviedo before completing postgraduate studies at the University of Wisconsin–Eau Claire and a law conversion at the National Distance Education University (UNED).

After graduating, he worked as the managing partner for a law firm in Asturias focusing on solvency matters and is a member of the Gijón Bar Association. He also authored a book The Expert and the Economic Test.

Blanco was a member and secretary of the Spanish liberal think-tank The Friday Club at university before joining the nationalist Vox at its inception in 2013. In 2019, he was elected as a member of the General Junta of the Principality of Asturias and subsequently became the leader of Vox in Asturias in 2020.

Politically, he supports lowering taxes on rural areas to fight against depopulation.
