= Ricardo Menéndez Salmón =

Spanish writer

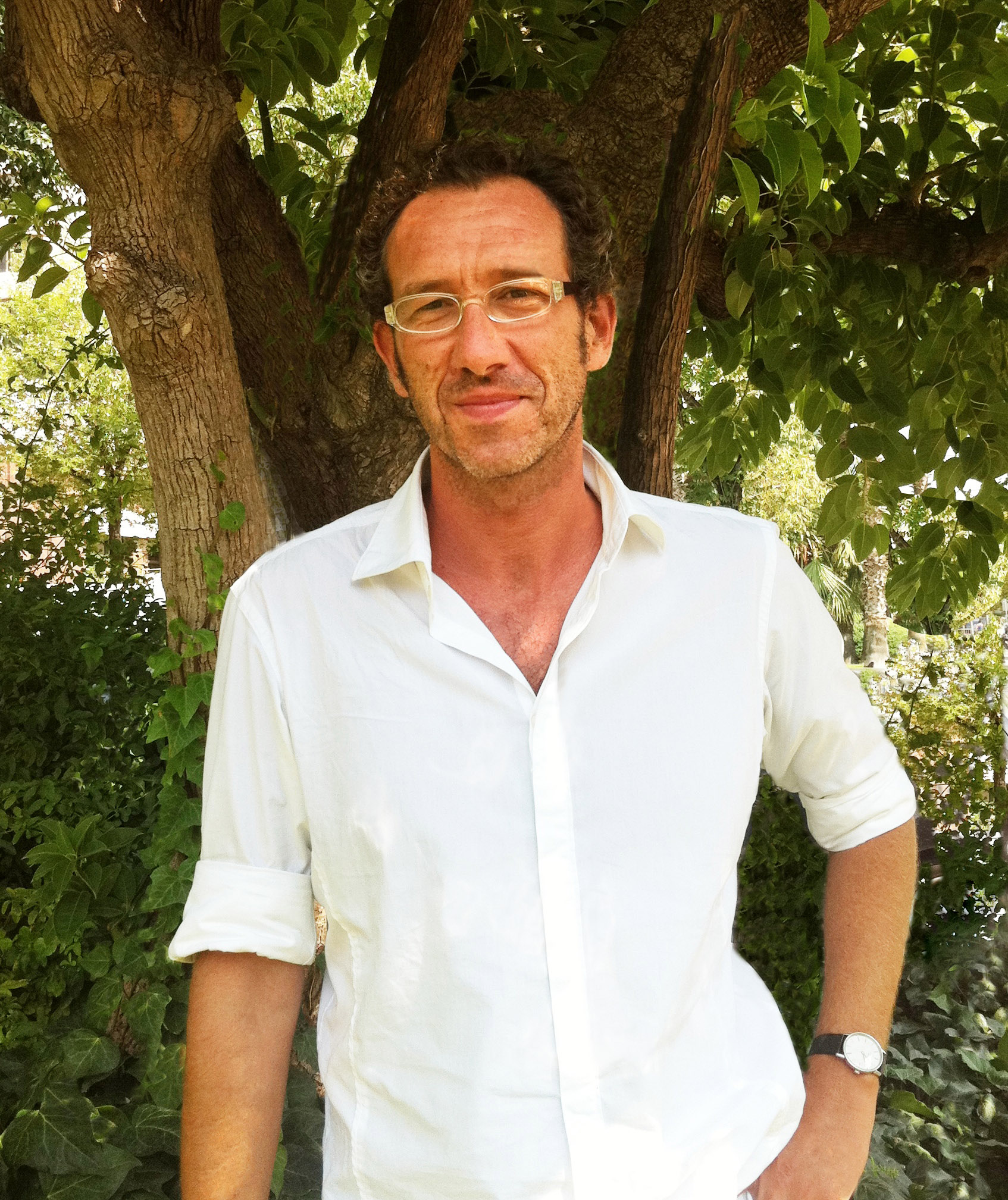
Ricardo Menéndez Salmón

Ricardo Menéndez Salmón is a Spanish novelist and writer. He was born in Gijón in Asturias province. He has written more than half a dozen novels.

== Career ==
He is best known for his trilogy of novels, consisting of La ofensa (2007), Derrumbe (2008) and El corrector (2009). La ofensa won the Qwerty Barcelona Televisión prize, the Librería Sintagma prize for Best Book of the Year, and Best Spanish Narrative of 2007 as selected by the literary journal Quimera. Other notable works include La noche feroz and La luz es más antigua que el amor.

He has also published a travel book, a play, poems and short stories. He contributes regularly to Spanish newspapers and literary journals.

He has won many literary prizes, including the 2016 Premio Biblioteca Breve for El Sistema, and has been translated into many languages, although not so far into English.
