= Juan Vázquez García =

Spanish economist

Juan Vázquez
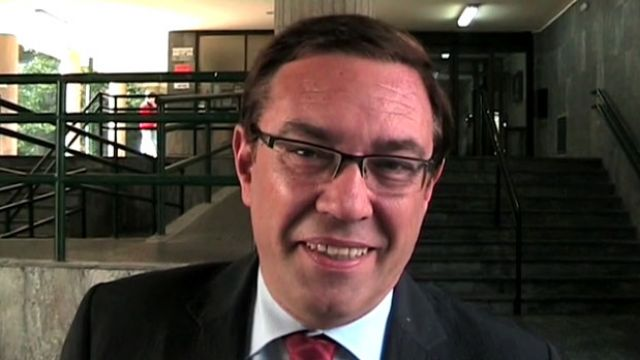
- Born: January 1, 1952 (age 73); Bo, Aller, Asturias, Spain
- Education: Economics and Business Sciences, Complutense University of Madrid; PhD. in Economics, University of Oviedo
- Occupation: Economist

Juan Antonio Vázquez García (born 1 January 1952 in Bo, Aller, Asturias) is a Spanish economist, who between 2000 and 2008 served as rector of the University of Oviedo, where he was a professor.

Vázquez has also served as president of the Conference of Rectors of Spanish Universities between 2003 and 2007, as vice-rector of the Menéndez Pelayo International University between 1995 and 1999 and dean of the Faculty of Economic and Business Sciences of the University of Oviedo between 1986 and 1994, as well as an adviser to multiple universities and the regional government of Asturias between 2012 and 2015.

In 2019 he became the candidate of the political party Citizens to the presidency of the Principality of Asturias. That same year he won a seat in the regional parliament, but he later resigned due to discrepancies with the national leadership of the party.

== Personal life ==
Juan Vázquez was born on the rural parish of Bo, in the municipality of Aller (Asturias). His mother was teacher and his father worked at the mines. His family moved to Caborana because of his mother's job, where he spent his teenage years. He was a boarder at Sagrada Familia del Pilar school in Pola de Lena. After he finished his secondary studies, he moved to Madrid, where he studied Economics and Business Sciences in the Complutense University.

He is married to María José Zamora, a biology teacher, and they have a son, Juan José Vázquez, who is also an economist.

== Academic life ==
During his last year at university, a professor of his was proposed a teaching post at the University of Oviedo, and asked Vázquez to join him as his assistant. He did his doctorate in Oviedo, for which he obtained the Extraordinary doctorate Award. In 1986 he was elected as dean of the Faculty of Economic and Business Sciences. A post he left in 1994 to became, next year, vice-rector of the Menéndez Pelayo International University.

In the 2000, Vázquez was elected as rector of the University of Oviedo, a position he unsuccessfully tried to get a few years before. He won over the incumbent rector, chemist Julio Rodríguez. During the election Vázquez was seen as the 'progressive' candidate and as someone closer to the then PSOE-led government of Asturias. Rodríguez was believed to be more conservative and closer to the People's Party. Vázquez won in the second round, with 218 against Rodríguez's 169. Vázquez was Oviedo's rector until 2008.

During his time as rector he was elected twice as president of Conference of Rectors of Spanish Universities.

His interests are mainly related to Asturias' regional economy, about which he has published multiple books and papers. During his time as professor he has participated in several conferences and his articles have been published in various journals on economics. He also made a stay, as visiting professor, at the University of California in 1995.

He's also been the director of a journal about asturian economy, Revista Asturiana de Economía (lit. Asturian Magazine of Economy) and co-director of Historia de la economía asturiana (lit. History of the asturian economy).

== Political career ==
In November 2018 it was reported that the emerging party Citizens had talked with Juan Vázquez about the possibility of him leading the party in the coming regional or local elections in Asturias. A month later, it was reported that Citizens had offered him to be the candidate to the presidency of Asturias or to the mayoralty of Oviedo. After a meeting with Albert Rivera in December, Vázquez was announced as candidate to the presidency in early January 2019.

After the regional elections, he won a seat in the General Junta of the Principality of Asturias, however, he resigned a few days later after it was confirmed that he will not be allowed to negotiate with the winner of the elections, PSOE. At his resignation speech he said that the party he joined in 2018 had "changed" and that it was a centred party, something that in his opinion, it was no longer.

In 2021 he published a book, Romanticismo y desencanto en política (lit. Romanticism and disenchantment in politics), in which he recounts his short stint in politics.

Prior to all of that, in 2012, it was reported that then-president of Asturias, Javier Fernández, proposed him to join his cabinet, something he refused.
