= Carmen Moriyón =

Spanish surgeon and politician

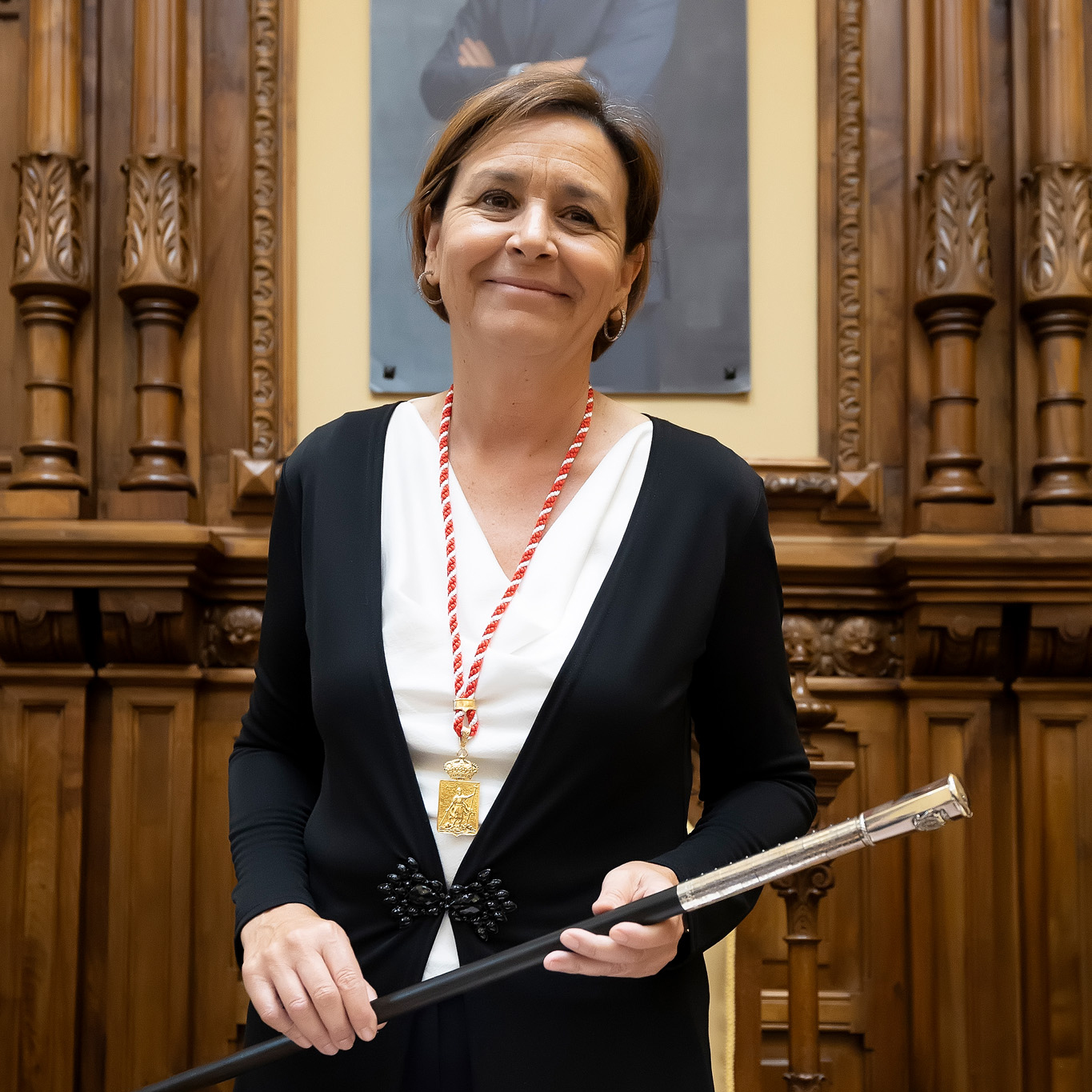
- Moriyón in 2023

Mayor of Gijón
- Incumbent
- Assumed office 17 June 2023
- Preceded by: Ana González
- In office 11 June 2011 – 15 June 2019
- Preceded by: Paz Fernández Felgueroso
- Succeeded by: Ana González

Personal details
- Born: María del Carmen Moriyón Entrialgo; 25 October 1966 (age 59) Gijón, Francoist Spain
- Party: Asturias Forum
- Education: University of Oviedo; Autonomous University of Madrid
- Occupation: Surgeon and politician

María del Carmen Moriyón Entrialgo (born 25 October 1966) is a Spanish surgeon and politician.

She headed the list of Asturias Forum to the mayor of Gijón in the municipal elections of Spain in 2011, getting 9 councilors and becoming the first non-socialist mayor of Gijón since the 1979 elections thanks to the support of the Popular Party in the investiture.

Carmen Moriyón is the daughter of Maximino Moriyón Álvarez and Margarita Entrialgo Álvarez, and widow of José Ramón Rodríguez-Galindo González a surgeon who died in 2009.

She studied at the College of the Holy Angel of the Guardian and the College of the Immaculate (promotion of 1984), and has a degree in Medicine and Surgery from the University of Oviedo (promotion of 1990) and specialist in Mastology from the Autonomous University of Madrid (2001). She was responsible for the Breast Cancer Unit at the Cabueñes Hospital until her election as mayor.

On 29 September 2018, Moriyón became president of the political party Asturias Forum.

After being the mayor of Gijón from 2011 to 2019, in 2023 she was elected mayor again.
