= Statute of Autonomy of the Principality of Asturias =

The Statute of Autonomy of the Principality of Asturias is a Spanish Organic Law that determines the fields, bodies and institutions of self-government of the Asturian autonomous community.

== History ==
On 1 June 1979, the political parties represented in the Deputation of Oviedo (UCD, PSOE, PCA and CD) agreed to start the autonomy process.

The draft of the Statute of Autonomy would follow the article 143.1 of the Spanish Constitution, after being approved by 72 of the 78 municipalities of Asturias.

On 22 April 1980 the project was sent to the Congress of Deputies. It would be approved on 15 December 1981. The Organic Law 7/1981, of the Statute of Autonomy for Asturias was published in the BOE on 30 December 1981.

In 1999, it changed the name from "Statute of Autonomy for Asturias" to "Statute of Autonomy of the Principality of Asturias".
