= Communist Party of Asturias =

Communist Party of Asturias Partido Comunista de Asturias
- Secretary-General: Francisco de Asís Fernández Junquera-Huergo
- Founded: 1978
- Ideology: Communism; Republicanism
- Political position: Left-wing
- National affiliation: United Left of Asturias

Website
- pcasturias.org

The Communist Party of Asturias (in Spanish: Partido Comunista de Asturias) is the federation of the Communist Party of Spain (PCE) in Asturias. The current general secretary is Francisco de Asís Fernández Junquera-Huergo.

In the 2011 Asturian elections the PCA decided to quit IU-IX and form a candidacy of its own, the Left Front, getting only 3 town councillors. After this electoral failure the PCA joined IU-IX again.
