= 7th General Junta of the Principality of Asturias =

7th General Junta
←	6th	8th	→
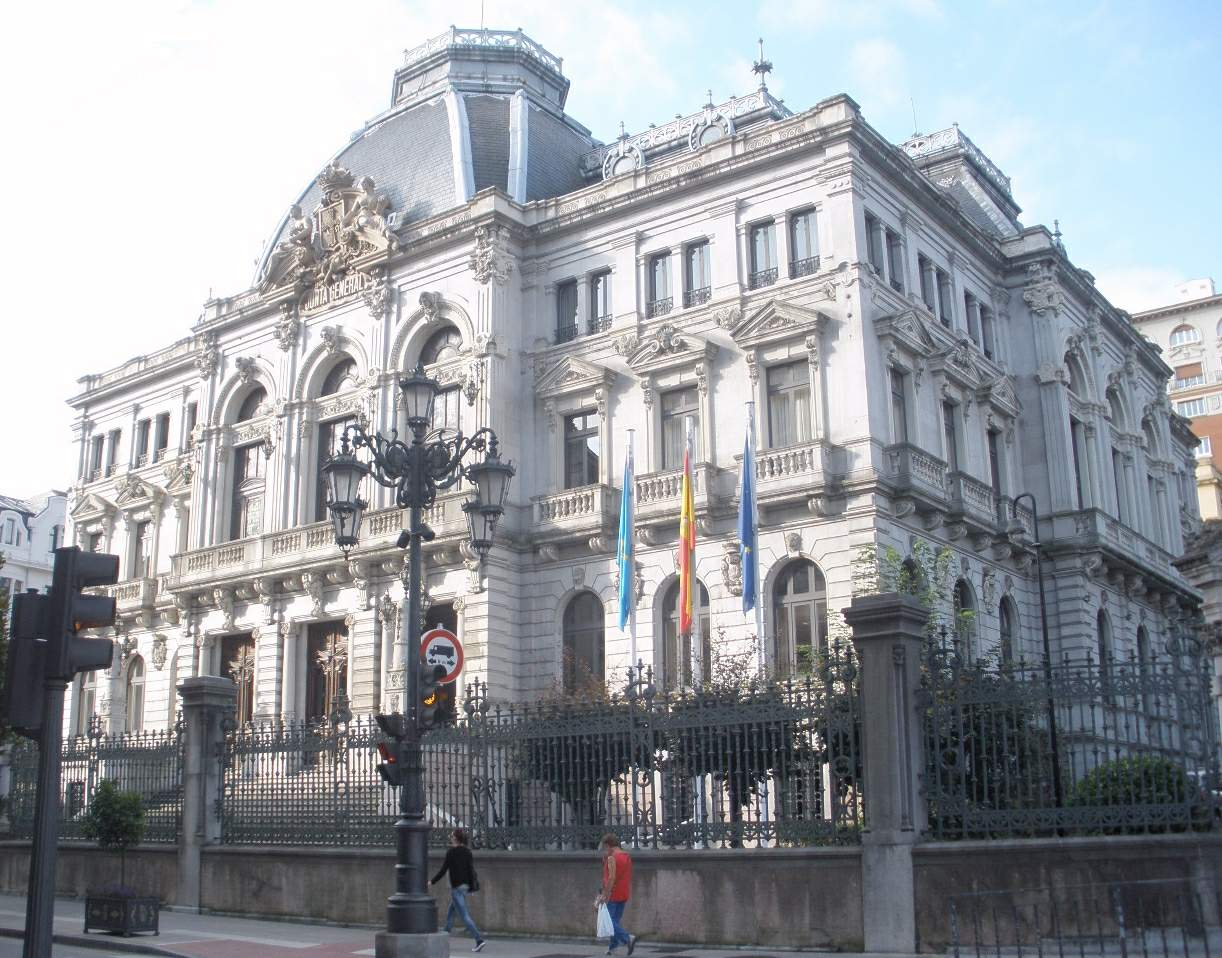

Overview
- Legislative body: General Junta of the Principality of Asturias
- Term: 21 June 2007 – 29 March 2011
- Election: 27 May 2007
- Government: Areces III

Deputies
- Composition of the General Junta in 2007.
- Members: 45
- President: María Jesús Álvarez (PSOE)
- First Vice-President: Manuel Aurelio Martín (IU-BA-LV, until 26 November 2008); Diana Camafeita (IU-BA-LV, since 11 December 2008)
- Second Vice-President: Pelayo Roces (PP, until 3 January 2011); Carlos Galcerán (PP, since 10 February 2011)
- First Secretary: Mercedes Álvarez (PSOE, until 26 November 2008); Servanda García (PSOE, since December 2008)
- Second Secretary: Fernando Goñi (PP)

The 7th General Junta was the meeting of the General Junta, the parliament of the Principality of Asturias, with the membership determined by the results of the regional election held on 27 May 2007. The congress met for the first time on 21 June 2007.

== Election ==
The 7th Asturian regional election was held on 27 May 2007. At the election the Spanish Socialist Workers' Party (PSOE) remained the largest party in the General Junta but fell short of a majority again.

Alliance	Votes	%	Seats	+/–
Spanish Socialist Workers' Party (PSOE)	252,201	42.04%	21	▼1
People's Party (PP)	248,907	41.50%	20	▲1
United Left-Bloc for Asturias-The Greens of Asturias (IU-BA-LV)	58,114	9.69%	4	Steady
Others/blanks	40,616	6.77%	0	
Total	599,838	100.00%	45	Steady

== History ==
The new parliament met for the first time on 21 June 2007. María Jesús Álvarez (PSOE) was elected as the president of the General Junta, with the support of PSOE and IU-BA-LV.

President
Candidate		Votes
María Jesús Álvarez	PSOE	26
Blank		20
Total		45

== Deaths, resignations and suspensions ==
The 7th General Junta has seen the following deaths, resignations and suspensions:

- 26 November 2008 - Manuel Aurelio Martín (IU/IX) and Noemí Martín (IU/IX) resigned after being appointed Minister of Rural Affairs and Fisheries and Minister of Social Welfare and Housing in the Asturian Government. Diana Camafeita (IU/IX) and Emilia Vázquez (IU/IX) replaced them respectively on 11 December 2008.
- 22 December 2009 - Francisco Javier García (IU/IX) resigned due to political disagreements with his party. Roberto Colunga (BA) replaced him on 4 February 2010.
- 13 July 2010 - Roberto Colunga (BA) left the United Left-Bloc of Asturias-The Greens group due to political disagreements with United Left, the biggest member of the coalition. He officially joined the Mixed group on 1 August 2010.
- 3 January 2011 - Pelayo Roces (PP) resigned in order to support former deputy prime minister of Spain, Francisco Álvarez-Cascos, who left the party after he wasn't picked as nominee for President of Asturias ahead of the 2007 Asturian regional election. José Manuel Felgueres replaced him on 10 February 2011.
- 31 January 2011 - Emilio Rodríguez (PP) resigned in order to join Asturias Forum (FAC), a split from the People's Party led by former deputy prime minister of Spain, Francisco Álvarez-Cascos. Pablo Álvarez (PP) replaced him on 17 February 2011.
- 3 February 2011 - Cristina Coto (PP) resigned in order to join Asturias Forum (FAC). María Isabel Pérez (PP) replaced her on 24 February 2011.
- 8 February 2011 - Marcial González (PP) resigned in order to join Asturias Forum (FAC). Rebeca Heli Álvarez (PP) replaced him on 10 March 2011.
- 17 February 2011 - Luis Servando Peláez (PP) resigned in order to join Asturias Forum (FAC). Álvaro Álvarez (PP) replaced him on 10 March 2011.

== Members ==
Name	Constituency	No.	Party	Alliance	Group	Took office	Left office	Notes
Maria Pilar Alonso	Central	10	FSA	PSOE	Socialist	21 June 2007	29 March 2011	
María Elma Alonso	Central	14	PPA	PP	People's	21 June 2007	29 March 2011	
Faustino Álvarez	Central	15	FSA	PSOE	Socialist	21 June 2007	29 March 2011	
Vicente Alberto Álvarez	Central	1	FSA	PSOE	Socialist	21 June 2007	29 March 2011	
Álvaro César Álvarez	Central	9	FSA	PSOE	Socialist	21 June 2007	29 March 2011	
María Jesús Álvarez	Western	2	FSA	PSOE	Socialist	21 June 2007	29 March 2011	
Mercedes Álvarez	Central	7	FSA	PSOE	Socialist	21 June 2007	29 March 2011	
Rebeca Heli Álvarez	Western	4	PPA	PP	People's	10 March 2011	29 March 2011	Replaces Marcial González.
Álvaro Álvarez	Central	19	PPA	PP	People's	10 March 2011	29 March 2011	Replaces Luis Servando Peláez.
Pablo Álvarez	Central	17	PPA	PP	People's	17 February 2011	29 March 2011	Replaces Emilio Rodríguez.
Reinerio Álvarez	Central	3	PPA	PP	People's	21 June 2007	29 March 2011	
Joaquín Aréstegui	Central	4	PPA	PP	People's	21 June 2007	29 March 2011	
Juan Ángel Bustillo	Eastern	2	PPA	PP	People's	21 June 2007	29 March 2011	
Diana Camafeita	Central	5	IU-IX	IU-BA-LV	IU-BA-LV	11 December 2008	29 March 2011	
Luis Ángel Colunga	Central	13	FSA	PSOE	Socialist	21 June 2007	29 March 2011	
Roberto Colunga	Central	7	BA	IU-BA-LV	IU-BA-LV	4 February 2010	29 March 2011	Replaces Francisco Javier García. Joined the Mixed Group in August 2010.
Roberto Colunga	Central	N/A	BA	BA	Mixed	4 February 2010	29 March 2011	Replaces Francisco Javier García. Joined the Mixed Group in August 2010.
Greta Cortina	Central	12	FSA	PSOE	Socialist	21 June 2007	29 March 2011	
María Clara del Pilar Costales	Central	14	FSA	PSOE	Socialist	21 June 2007	29 March 2011	
Cristina Coto	Central	5	PPA	PP	People's	21 June 2007	3 February 2011	Replaced by María Isabel Pérez
José Agustín Cuervas-Mons	Central	11	PPA	PP	People's	21 June 2007	29 March 2011	
Alejandra Inés Cuétara	Central	7	PPA	PP	People's	21 June 2007	29 March 2011	
María Elena Díaz	Central	4	FSA	PSOE	Socialist	21 June 2007	29 March 2011	
Balbino Dosantos	Central	6	FSA	PSOE	Socialist	21 June 2007	29 March 2011	
Benigno Enriquez	Central	8	FSA	PSOE	Socialist	21 June 2007	29 March 2011	
José Manuel Felgueres	Eastern	3	PPA	PP	People's	10 February 2011	29 March 2011	Replaces Pelayo Roces Arbesú.
Constantino Fernández	Central	11	FSA	PSOE	Socialist	21 June 2007	29 March 2011	
Javier Fernández	Central	2	FSA	PSOE	Socialist	21 June 2007	29 March 2011	
Carlos Galcerán	Central	12	PPA	PP	People's	21 June 2007	29 March 2011	
José Ramón García	Central	9	PPA	PP	People's	21 June 2007	29 March 2011	
Servanda García	Western	3	FSA	PSOE	Socialist	21 June 2007	29 March 2011	
Francisco Javier García	Central	2	IU-IX	IU-BA-LV	IU-BA-LV	21 June 2007	22 December 2009	Replaced by Roberto Colunga.
Fernando Goñi	Central	8	PPA	PP	People's	21 June 2007	29 March 2011	
Inmaculada Concepción González	Central	6	PPA	PP	People's	21 June 2007	29 March 2011	
Marcial González	Western	3	PPA	PP	People's	21 June 2007	8 February 2011	Replaced by Rebeca Heli Álvarez.
Juan Benjamín Gutierrez	Central	5	FSA	PSOE	Socialist	21 June 2007	29 March 2011	
Jesús Enrique Iglesias	Central	1	IU-IX	IU-BA-LV	IU-BA-LV	21 June 2007	29 March 2011	
Adriana Lastra	Eastern	3	FSA	PSOE	Socialist	21 June 2007	29 March 2011	
Fernando Lastra	Western	1	FSA	PSOE	Socialist	21 June 2007	29 March 2011	
Alfonso Román Lopez	Western	1	PPA	PP	People's	21 June 2007	29 March 2011	
Manuel Aurelio Martín	Central	4	IU-IX	IU-BA-LV	IU-BA-LV	21 June 2007	26 November 2008	Replaced by Diana Camafeita.
Noemí Martín	Central	3	IU-IX	IU-BA-LV	IU-BA-LV	21 June 2007	26 November 2008	Replaced by Emilia Vázquez.
Emilio Rodríguez	Central	13	PPA	PP	People's	21 June 2007	31 January 2011	Replaced by Pablo Álvarez.
Ana Rosa Migoya	Eastern	1	FSA	PSOE	Socialist	21 June 2007	29 March 2011	
Belarmina Montes	Central	15	PPA	PP	People's	21 June 2007	29 March 2011	
Luis Servando Peláez	Central	10	PPA	PP	People's	21 June 2007	17 February 2011	Replaced by Álvaro Álvarez.
Emilio Pérez	Western	2	PPA	PP	People's	21 June 2007	29 March 2011	
María Isabel Pérez	Central	18	PPA	PP	People's	24 February 2011	29 March 2011	Replaces Cristina Coto.
María José Ramos	Central	3	FSA	PSOE	Socialist	21 June 2007	29 March 2011	
Alfonso Rey	Eastern	2	FSA	PSOE	Socialist	21 June 2007	29 March 2011	
Pelayo Roces	Eastern	1	PPA	PP	People's	21 June 2007	3 January 2011	Replaced by José Manuel Felgueres.
Ovidio Sánchez	Central	1	PPA	PP	People's	21 June 2007	29 March 2011	
Emilia Vázquez	Central	6	IU-IX	IU-BA-LV	IU-BA-LV	11 December 2008	29 March 2011	
