= 9th General Junta of the Principality of Asturias =

2012–2015 meeting of Asturias regional legislature

9th General Junta
←	8th	10th	→
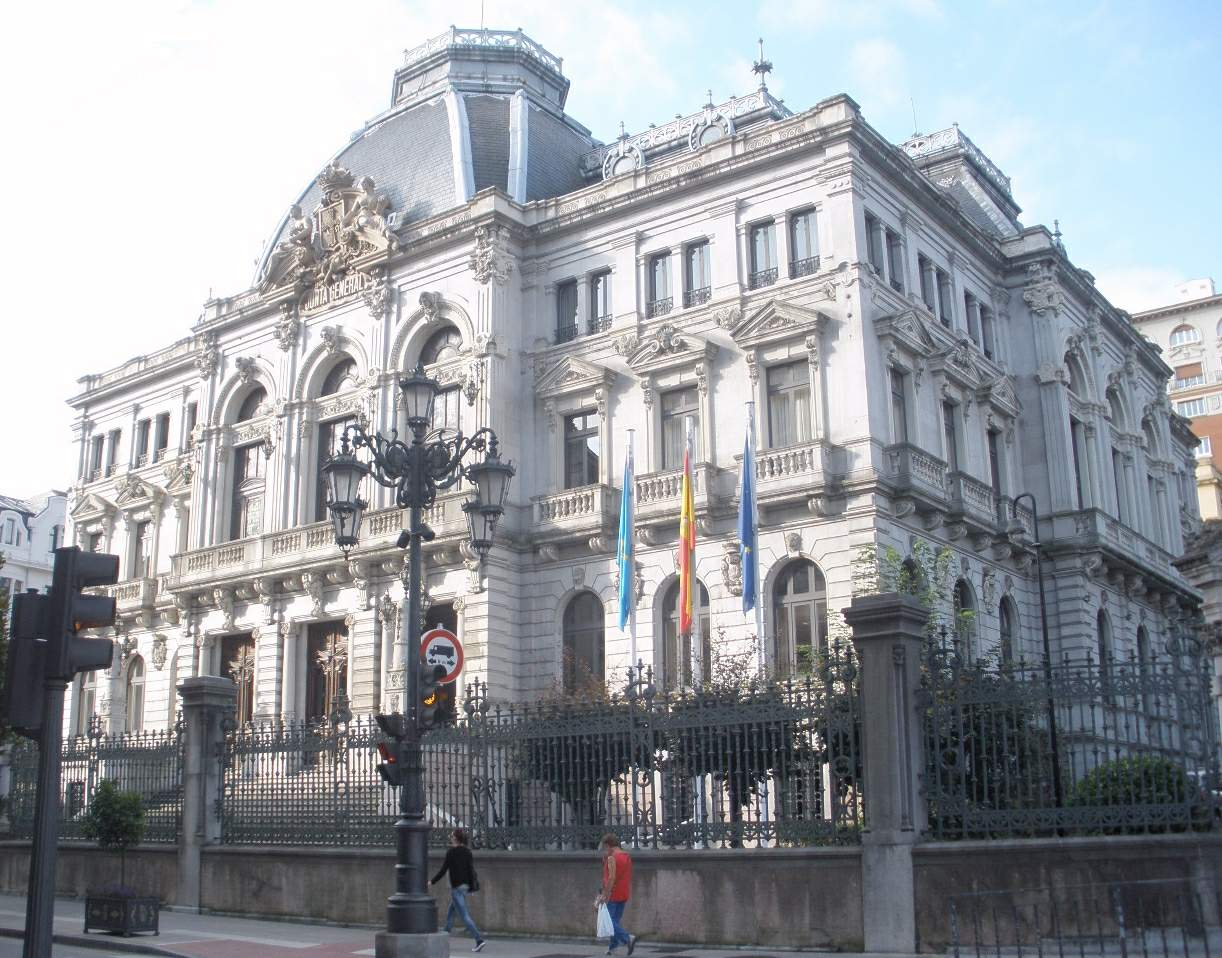

Overview
- Legislative body: General Junta of the Principality of Asturias
- Term: 27 April 2012 – 16 June 2015
- Election: 25 March 2012
- Government: Fernández I
- Website: jgpa.es

Deputies
- Members: 45
- President: Pedro Sanjurjo (PSOE)
- First Vice-President: Pelayo Roces (FAC)
- Second Vice-President: José Agustín Cuervas-Mons (PP)
- First Secretary: Aurelio Martín (IU/IX, until 26 June 2014); Emilia Vázquez (IU/IX, since 26 June 2014)
- Second Secretary: Ignacio Prendes (UPyD)

The 9th General Junta was the meeting of the General Junta, the parliament of the Principality of Asturias, with the membership determined by the results of the regional snap election held on 25 March 2012. The congress met for the first time on 27 April 2012.

== Election ==
The 9th Asturian regional election was held on 25 March 2012, as a snap election. At the election, the Spanish Socialist Workers' Party (PSOE) passed Asturias Forum (FAC) as the most voted party. Finally, a draw between left and right was broken by the only member of Union, Progress and Democracy (UPyD) that gave back the government to the left.

Alliance	Votes	%	Seats	+/–
Spanish Socialist Workers' Party (PSOE)	161,159	32.10%	17	▲2
Forum of Citizens (FAC)	124,518	24.80%	12	▼4
People's Party (PP)	108,091	21.53%	10	Steady
United Left of Asturias (IU/IX)	69,118	13.77%	5	▲1
Union, Progress and Democracy (UPyD)	18,801	3.74%	1	▲1
Others/blanks	20,386	4.06%	0	
Total	502,073	100.00%	45	Steady

== History ==
The new parliament met for the first time on 27 April 2012. After two rounds, Pedro Sanjurjo (PSOE) was elected as the president of the General Junta, in a parliament composed provisionally by 44 members out of the 45 possibles, as Foro Asturias (FAC) challenged the result of the western district to the justice court of Asturias.

President
Candidate		Votes	
Candidate		Round 1	Round 2
Pedro Sanjurjo	PSOE	22	22
Blank		22	22
Total		44	44

== Deaths, resignations and suspensions ==
The 9th General Junta has seen the following deaths, resignations and suspensions:

- 6 December 2012 - Carmen Sela (Foro) resigned for personal reasons. However, the media speculated that political disagreements within her party could have taken an important role in her decision. María del Mar García Poo (Foro) replaced her on 21 December 2012.
- 30 May 2012 - Isidro Martínez Oblanca (Foro) and Jesús Iglesias (IU/IX) resigned after being appointed senators by the General Junta. Carmen Fernández (Foro) and Marta Pulgar (IU/IX) replaced them on 12 July and 16 July 2012, respectively.
- 9 May 2013 - Francisco González (PSOE) resigned after the opening of oral proceedings for alleged irregularities committed during his time as mayor of Cudillero. In July 2014 he left the Asturian Socialist Federation after he was found guilty of those irregularities. Elsa Peréz (PSOE) replaced him on 16 May 2013.
- 29 May 2014 - Ángel González (IU/IX) was expelled by the General Junta after his refusal to resign following a ruling that disqualified him from holding public office. His expulsion was supported by PSOE, IU/IX and UPyD, while PP and Foro abstained. Earlier that month United Left of Asturias had expelled him from the party. Luis Álvarez replaced him on 16 June 2014.

== Members ==
Name	Constituency	No.	Party	Alliance	Group	Took office	Left office	Notes
María Pilar Alonso	Central	5	FSA	PSOE	Socialists	27 April 2012	16 June 2015	
María Teresa Alonso	Central	8	FAC	FAC	Asturias Forum	27 April 2012	16 June 2015	
Luis Manuel Álvarez	Central	7	IU/IX	IU/IX	United Left	19 June 2014	16 June 2015	Replaces Ángel González
María Jesús Álvarez	Western	1	FSA	PSOE	Socialists	27 April 2012	16 June 2015	
Francisco Álvarez-Cascos	Central	1	FAC	FAC	Asturias Forum	27 April 2012	16 June 2015	
Juan Ramón Campo	Western	1	FAC	FAC	Asturias Forum	27 April 2012	16 June 2015	
María Dolores Carcedo	Central	3	FSA	PSOE	Socialists	27 April 2012	16 June 2015	
Cristina Coto	Central	1	FAC	FAC	Asturias Forum	27 April 2012	16 June 2015	
José Agustín Cuervas-Mons	Central	4	PPA	PP	People's	27 April 2012	16 June 2015	Second Vice-president
Victoria Delgado	Central	6	PPA	PP	People's	27 April 2012	16 June 2015	
Nuria Devesa	Central	7	FSA	PSOE	Socialists	27 April 2012	16 June 2015	
José Manuel Felgueres	Eastern	1	PPA	PP	People's	27 April 2012	16 June 2015	
Carmen Fernández	Central	10	FAC	FAC	Asturias Forum	12 July 2012	16 June 2015	Replaces Isidro Martínez Oblanca
Javier Fernández	Central	1	FSA	PSOE	Socialists	27 April 2012	16 June 2015	
Mercedes Fernández	Central	1	PPA	PP	People's	27 April 2012	16 June 2015	
Judit Flórez	Central	12	FSA	PSOE	Socialists	27 April 2012	16 June 2015	
María del Mar García Poo	Eastern	3	FAC	FAC	Asturias Forum	20 December 2012	16 June 2015	Replaces Carmen Sela
Ángel González	Central	5	IU/IX	IU/IX	United Left	27 April 2012	19 June 2014	Replaced by Luis Manuel Álvarez
Francisco González	Western	3	FSA	PSOE	Socialists	27 April 2012	16 May 2013	Replaced by Elsa Pérez
Fernando Goñi	Central	2	PPA	PP	People's	27 April 2012	16 June 2015	
Jesús Gutiérrez	Central	6	FSA	PSOE	Socialists	27 April 2012	16 June 2015	
Vicente Herranz	Central	10	FSA	PSOE	Socialists	27 April 2012	16 June 2015	
Marina Huerta	Eastern	1	FAC	FAC	Asturias Forum	27 April 2012	16 June 2015	
Jesús Iglesias	Central	1	IU/IX	IU/IX	United Left	27 April 2012	5 July 2012	Replaced by Marta Pulgar
Esther Landa	Central	2	FAC	FAC	Asturias Forum	27 April 2012	16 June 2015	
Adriana Lastra	Eastern	1	FSA	PSOE	Socialists	27 April 2012	16 June 2015	
Fernando Lastra	Central	2	FSA	PSOE	Socialists	27 April 2012	16 June 2015	
Albano Longo	Central	5	FAC	FAC	Asturias Forum	27 April 2012	16 June 2015	
Alfonso López	Western	1	PPA	PP	People's	27 April 2012	16 June 2015	
Susana López Ares	Central	8	PPA	PP	People's	27 April 2012	16 June 2015	
Marcelino Marcos	Western	2	FSA	PSOE	Socialists	27 April 2012	16 June 2015	
Aurelio Martín	Central	3	IU/IX	IU/IX	United Left	27 April 2012	16 June 2015	Second secretary until 26 June 2014
Noemí Martín	Central	2	IU/IX	IU/IX	United Left	27 April 2012	16 June 2015	
José Antonio Martínez	Central	7	FAC	FAC	Asturias Forum	27 April 2012	16 June 2015	
Isidro Martínez Oblanca	Central	4	FAC	FAC	Asturias Forum	27 April 2012	12 July 2012	Replaced by Carmen Fernández
Manuel Peña	Central	9	FAC	FAC	Asturias Forum	27 April 2012	16 June 2015	
Elsa Pérez	Western	4	FSA	PSOE	Socialists	16 May 2013	16 June 2015	Replaces Francisco González
José María Pérez	Central	4	FSA	PSOE	Socialists	27 April 2012	16 June 2015	
Marina Pineda	Central	9	FSA	PSOE	Socialists	27 April 2012	16 June 2015	
Ignacio Prendes	Central	1	UPyD	UPyD	Mixed	27 April 2012	16 June 2015	First Secretary
Marta Pulgar	Central	6	IU/IX	IU/IX	United Left	16 July 2012	16 June 2015	Replaces Jesús Iglesias
Emma Ramos	Central	3	PPA	PP	People's	27 April 2012	16 June 2015	
Pelayo Roces	Central	3	FAC	FAC	Asturias Forum	27 April 2012	16 June 2015	
Matías Rodríguez	Western	2	PPA	PP	People's	27 April 2012	16 June 2015	
Pedro Sanjurjo	Central	11	FSA	PSOE	Socialists	27 April 2012	16 June 2015	President
Carmen Sela	Central	8	FAC	FAC	Asturias Forum	27 April 2012	20 December 2012	Replaced by María del Mar García Poo
Marcelino Torre	Central	8	FSA	PSOE	Socialists	27 April 2012	16 June 2015	
Emilia Vázquez	Central	4	IU/IX	IU/IX	United Left	27 April 2012	16 June 2015	Second secretary since 26 June 2014
Alejandro Vega	Eastern	2	FSA	PSOE	Socialists	27 April 2012	16 June 2015	
Luis Venta	Central	7	PPA	PP	People's	27 April 2012	16 June 2015	
