= 6th General Junta of the Principality of Asturias =

2003–2007 meeting of Asturias regional legislature

6th General Junta
←	5th	7th	→
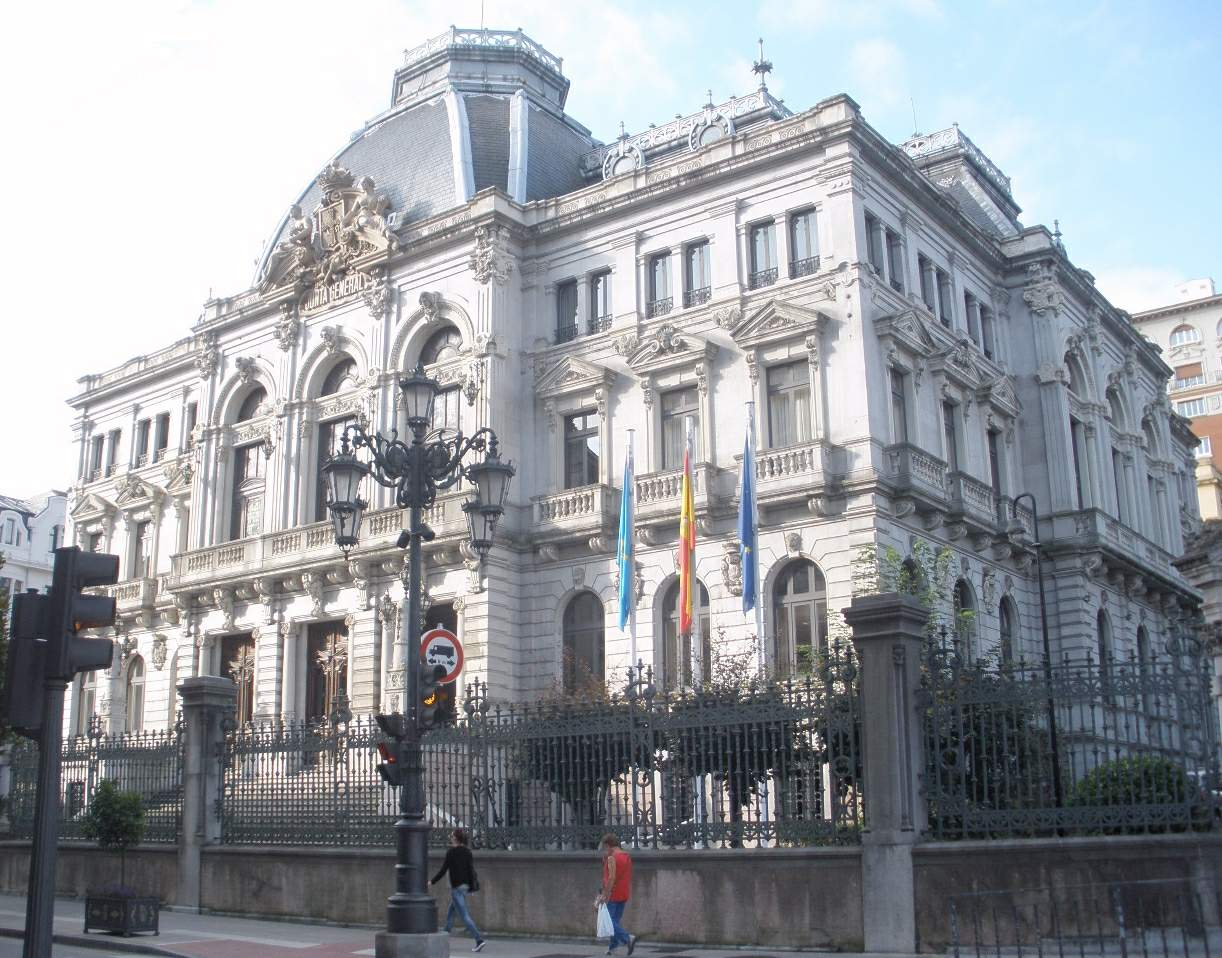

Overview
- Legislative body: General Junta of the Principality of Asturias
- Term: 17 June 2003 – 2 April 2007
- Election: 25 May 2003
- Government: Areces II

Deputies
- Composition of the General Junta in 2003.
- Members: 45
- President: María Jesús Álvarez (PSOE)
- First Vice-President: Manuel Aurelio Martín (IU-BA)
- Second Vice-President: Pelayo Roces (PP)
- First Secretary: Balbino Dosantos (PSOE)
- Second Secretary: Fernando Goñi (PP)

The 6th General Junta was the meeting of the General Junta, the parliament of the Principality of Asturias, with the membership determined by the results of the regional election held on 25 May 2003. The congress met for the first time on 17 June 2003.

== Election ==
The 6th Asturian regional election was held on 25 May 2003. At the election the Spanish Socialist Workers' Party (PSOE) remained the largest party in the General Junta but fell short of a majority after losing 2 seats.

Alliance	Votes	%	Seats	+/–
Spanish Socialist Workers' Party (PSOE)	250,474	40.48%	22	▼2
People's Party (PP)	242,396	39.18%	19	▲4
United Left-Bloc for Asturias (IU-BA)	68,360	11.05%	4	▲1
Asturian Renewal Union (URAS)	17,552	2.84%	0	▼3
Others/blanks	50,934	6.46%	0	
Total	618,716	100.00%	45	Steady

== History ==
The new parliament met for the first time on 17 June 2003. María Jesús Álvarez (PSOE) was elected as the president of the General Junta, with the support of PSOE and IU-BA-LV.

President
Candidate		Votes
María Jesús Álvarez	PSOE	23
Blank		22
Total		45

== Deaths, resignations and suspensions ==
The 6th General Junta has seen the following deaths, resignations and suspensions:

- 4 September 2003 – Juana María González (PSOE) resigned. She was replaced by Ruben Almeida (PSOE) on 24 September 2003.
- 25 March 2004 – Maria Luisa Carcedo (PSOE) resigned after being elected member of the Congress of Deputies in the 2004 general elections. Manuel Alfredo Pérez (PSOE) replaced her on 1 April 2004.
- 29 October 2006 – Manuel Alfredo Pérez (PSOE) passed away. He was replaced by María Azucena Cotos (PSOE).

== Members ==
Name	Constituency	No.	Party	Alliance	Group	Took office	Left office	Notes
Rubén Almeida	Eastern	4	FSA	PSOE	Socialist	24 September 2003	2 April 2007	Replaces Juana María González del Cabo.
Faustino Álvarez	Central	11	FSA	PSOE	Socialist	17 June 2003	2 April 2007	
Vicente Álvarez	Central	1	FSA	PSOE	Socialist	17 June 2003	2 April 2007	
Álvaro César Álvarez	Central	7	FSA	PSOE	Socialist	17 June 2003	2 April 2007	
María Jesús Álvarez	Western	2	FSA	PSOE	Socialist	17 June 2003	2 April 2007	
Reinerio Álvarez	Central	3	PPA	PP	People's	17 June 2003	2 April 2007	
Joaquín Aréstegui	Central	6	PPA	PP	People's	17 June 2003	2 April 2007	
Ana María Barrientos	Central	2	PPA	PP	People's	17 June 2003	2 April 2007	
Diana Camafeita	Central	4	IU-IX	IU-BA	IU-BA	17 June 2003	2 April 2007	
María Luisa Carcedo	Central	2	FSA	PSOE	Socialist	17 June 2003	25 March 2004	Replaced by Manuel Alfredo Pérez
Luis Ángel Colunga	Central	14	FSA	PSOE	Socialist	17 June 2003	2 April 2007	
Diego Comins	Central	14	PPA	PP	People's	17 June 2003	2 April 2007	
Cristina Coto	Central	12	PPA	PP	People's	17 June 2003	2 April 2007	
Alejandra Inés Cuétara	Eastern	1	PPA	PP	People's	17 June 2003	2 April 2007	
María Azucena Cuetos	Central	17	FSA	PSOE	Socialist	16 November 2006	2 April 2007	Replaces Manuel Alfredo Pérez.
María Elena Díaz	Central	8	FSA	PSOE	Socialist	17 June 2003	2 April 2007	
Balbino Dosantos	Central	6	FSA	PSOE	Socialist	17 June 2003	2 April 2007	
Benigno Eríquez	Central	10	FSA	PSOE	Socialist	17 June 2003	2 April 2007	
José Manuel Felgueres	Eastern	2	PPA	PP	People's	17 June 2003	2 April 2007	
María Montserrat Fernández	Central	12	FSA	PSOE	Socialist	17 June 2003	2 April 2007	
María Flor Fernández	Central	15	FSA	PSOE	Socialist	17 June 2003	2 April 2007	
José Ángel Fernández	Central	3	FSA	PSOE	Socialist	17 June 2003	2 April 2007	
Carlos Galcerán	Central	10	PPA	PP	People's	17 June 2003	2 April 2007	
José Ramón García	Central	9	PPA	PP	People's	17 June 2003	2 April 2007	
Francisco Javier García	Central	1	IU-IX	IU-BA	IU-BA	17 June 2003	23 January 2004	Replaced by María Paloma Uría.
Fernando Goñi	Central	8	PPA	PP	People's	17 June 2003	2 April 2007	
Juana María González	Eastern	2	FSA	PSOE	Socialist	17 June 2003	4 September 2003	Replaced by Rubén Almeida.
Inmaculada Concepción González	Central	13	PPA	PP	People's	17 June 2003	2 April 2007	
Marcial González	Ocidental	3	PPA	PP	People's	17 June 2003	2 April 2007	
Rodrigo Grossi	Central	11	PPA	PP	People's	17 June 2003	2 April 2007	
Juan Benjamín Gutiérrez	Central	5	FSA	PSOE	Socialist	17 June 2003	2 April 2007	
Fernando Lastra	Western	1	FSA	PSOE	Socialist	17 June 2003	2 April 2007	
José Amado Mallada	Central	13	FSA	PSOE	Socialist	17 June 2003	2 April 2007	
Manuel Aurelio Martín	Central	3	IU-IX	IU-BA	IU-BA	17 June 2003	2 April 2007	
Noemí Martín	Central	2	IU-IX	IU-BA	IU-BA	17 June 2003	2 April 2007	
Ana Rosa Migoya	Eastern	1	FSA	PSOE	Socialist	17 June 2003	2 April 2007	
Juan Manuel Morales	Central	4	PPA	PP	People's	17 June 2003	2 April 2007	
Luis Servando Peláez	Central	5	PPA	PP	People's	17 June 2003	2 April 2007	
Emilio Pérez	Western	2	PPA	PP	People's	17 June 2003	2 April 2007	
Manuel Alfredo Pérez	Central	16	FSA	PSOE	Socialist	1 April 2004	28 October 2006	Replaces María Luisa Carcedo. Replaced by María Azucena Cuetos.
María José Ramos	Central	4	FSA	PSOE	Socialist	17 June 2003	2 April 2007	
Alfonso Rey	Eastern	3	FSA	PSOE	Socialist	17 June 2003	2 April 2007	
Pelayo Roces	Central	7	PPA	PP	People's	17 June 2003	2 April 2007	
Emilio Rodríguez	Western	1	PPA	PP	People's	17 June 2003	2 April 2007	
Ovidio Sánchez	Central	1	PPA	PP	People's	17 June 2003	2 April 2007	
José Manuel Sariego	Central	9	FSA	PSOE	Socialist	17 June 2003	2 April 2007	
María Paloma Uría	Central	5	IU-IX	IU-BA	IU-BA	5 February 2004	2 April 2007	Replaces Francisco Javier García.
