= 10th General Junta of the Principality of Asturias =

10th General Junta
←	9th	11th	→
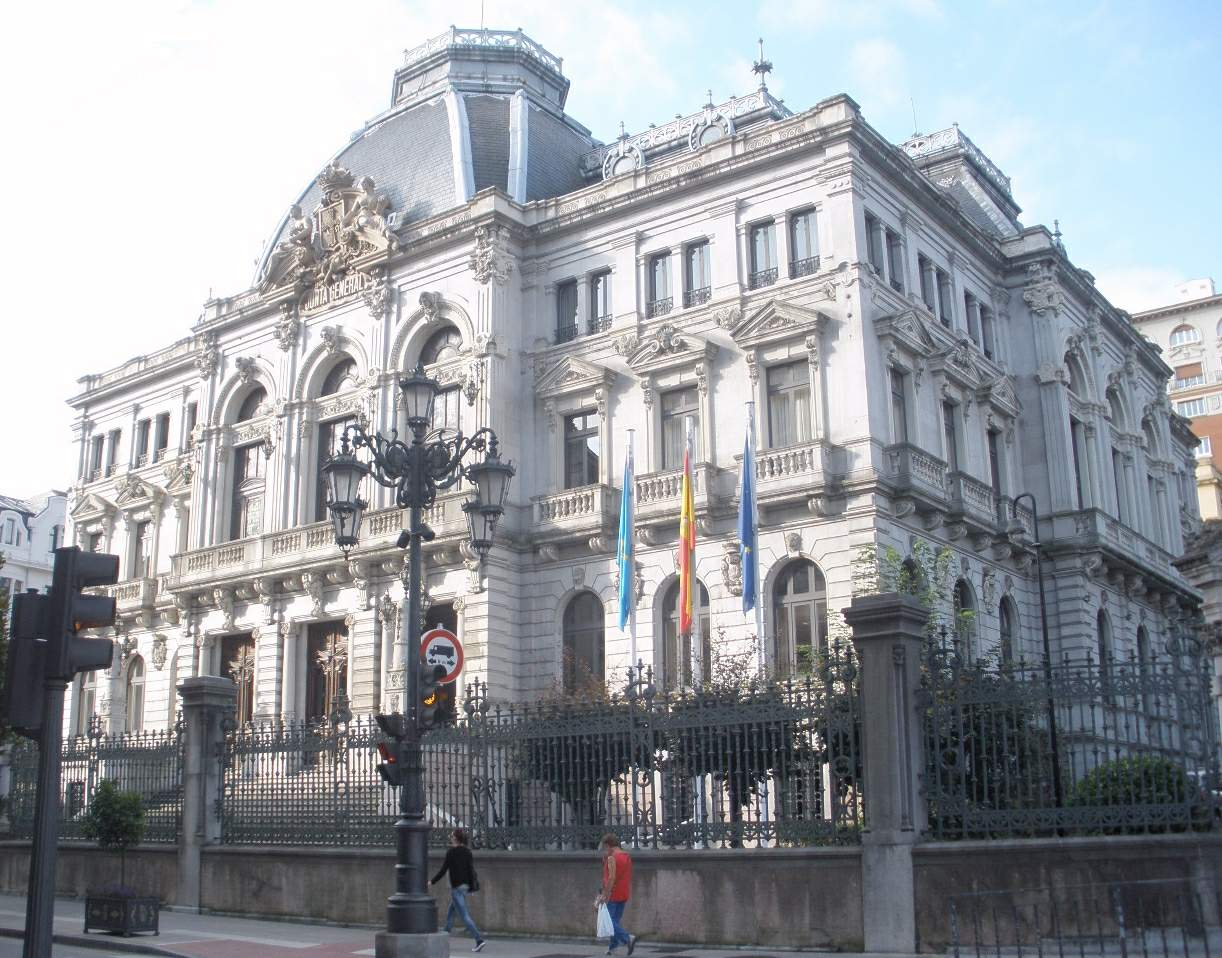

Overview
- Legislative body: General Junta of the Principality of Asturias
- Term: 16 June 2015 – 24 June 2019
- Election: 24 May 2015
- Government: Fernández II
- Website: jgpa.es

Deputies
- Members: 45
- President: Pedro Sanjurjo (PSOE)
- First Vice-President: María Josefa Miranda (IU/IX)
- Second Vice-President: José Agustín Cuervas-Mons (PP)
- First Secretary: Ignacio Prendes (C's, until 5 February 2016); Pedro Leal (FAC, since 5 February 2016)
- Second Secretary: Rosa María Espiño (Podemos)

The 10th General Junta was the meeting of the General Junta, the parliament of the Principality of Asturias, with the membership determined by the results of the regional election held on 24 May 2015. The congress met for the first time on 15 June 2019.

== Election ==
The 10th Asturian regional election was held on 24 May 2015. At the election the Spanish Socialist Workers' Party (PSOE) remained the largest party in the General Junta but fell short of a majority again.

Alliance	Votes	%	Seats	+/–
Spanish Socialist Workers' Party (PSOE)	143,851	26.48%	14	▼3
People's Party (PP)	117,319	21.59%	11	▲1
We Can (Podemos)	103,571	19.06%	9	▲9
United Left of Asturias (IU/IX)	64,868	11.94%	5	Steady
Forum of Citizens (FAC)	44,480	8.19%	3	▼9
Citizens–Party of the Citizenry (C's)	38,687	7.12%	3	▲3
Others/blanks	30,569	5.62%	0	
Total	543,345	100.00%	45	Steady

== History ==
The new parliament met for the first time on 26 June 2015 and after two rounds, Pedro Sanjurjo (PSOE) was re-elected as President of the General Junta.

President
Candidate		Votes	
Candidate		Round 1	Round 2
Pedro Sanjurjo	PSOE	22	22
Emma Ramos	PP	14	14
Blank		9	9
Total		45	45

== Deaths, resignations and suspensions ==
The 10th General Junta has seen the following deaths, resignations and suspensions:

- 25 September 2015 - Fernando Goñi (PP) resigned after being appointed senator. David González Medina replaced him on 8 October 2015.
- 29 September 2015 - Argimiro Rodríguez (Foro) and Esther Landa (Foro) resigned. Pedro Leal (Foro) and Isidro Martínez Oblanca (Foro) replaced them on 15 October 2015 and on 29 October 2015, respectively.
- 20 December 2015 - Susana López Ares (PP), Isidro Martínez Oblanca (Foro) and Ignacio Prendes (Independent, Cs) resigned after being elected members of the Congress of Deputies. Rafael Alonso (PP), Carmen Fernández (Foro) and Armando Bartolomé (Cs) replaced them, respectively, on 4 February 2016.
- 5 September 2017 - Emma Ramos (PP) resigned. Gloria García (PP) replaced her on 15 September 2017.
- 19 June 2018 - Cristina Coto (Foro) resigned after dissagrements with her party. Early that year, she also resigned as president and spokesperson of Foro. Patricia García (Foro) replaced her on 18 July 2018.
- 21 January 2019 - Gaspar Llamzares (IU), leader of United Left in Asturias, resigned after political dissagrements with his party. Jaime Gareth Flórez replaced him on 8 February 2019.

== Members ==
Name	Constituency	No.	Party	Alliance	Group	Took office	Left office	Notes
Rafael Alonso	Central	9	PPA	PP	People's	4 February 2016	24 June 2019	Replaces Susana López Ares
Dolores Álvarez Campillo	Eastern	1	FSA	PSOE	Socialists	16 June 2015	24 June 2019	
María Dolores Carcedo	Central	2	FSA	PSOE	Socialists	16 June 2015	24 June 2019	
Cristina Coto	Central	1	FAC	FAC	Asturias Forum	16 June 2015	18 July 2018	Replaced by Patricia García
José Agustín Cuervas-Mons	Central	6	PPA	PP	People's	16 June 2015	24 June 2019	Second Vice-President
Nuria Devesa	Central	6	FSA	PSOE	Socialists	16 June 2015	24 June 2019	
Rosa María Espiño	Central	6	Podemos	Podemos	Podemos Asturias	16 June 2015	24 June 2019	Second Secretary
Andrés Fernández	Western	1	Podemos	Podemos	Podemos Asturias	16 June 2015	24 June 2019	
Carmen Fernández	Central	6	FAC	FAC	Asturias Forum	4 February 2016	24 June 2019	Replaces Isidro Martínez Oblanca
Javier Fernández	Central	1	FSA	PSOE	Socialists	16 June 2015	24 June 2019	
Luis Armando Fernández	Central	4	Independent	C's	Citizens	4 February 2016	24 June 2019	Replaces Ignacio Prendes
Mercedes Fernández	Central	1	PPA	PP	People's	16 June 2015	24 June 2019	
Gloria García	Central	10	PPA	PP	People's	15 September 2017	24 June 2019	Replaces Emma Ramos
Nicanor García	Central	2	C's	C's	Citizens	16 June 2015	24 June 2019	
Patricia García	Central	8	FAC	FAC	Asturias Forum	18 July 2018	18 July 2018	Replaces Cristina Coto
Jaime Gareth	Central	6	IU/IX	IU/IX	United Left	8 February 2019	24 June 2019	Replaces Gaspar Llamazares
Lorena Gil	Central	4	Podemos	Podemos	Podemos Asturias	16 June 2015	24 June 2019	
María Fe Gómez	Eastern	2	PPA	PP	People's	16 June 2015	24 June 2019	
David González	Central	8	PPA	PP	People's	8 October 2015	24 June 2019	Replaces Fernando Goñi
Fernando Goñi	Central	5	PPA	PP	People's	16 June 2015	8 October 2015	Replaces María Fe Gómez
Marcos Gutiérrez Escandón	Eastern	2	FSA	PSOE	Socialists	16 June 2015	24 June 2019	
Jesús Gutiérrez	Central	5	FSA	PSOE	Socialists	16 June 2015	24 June 2019	
Esther Landa	Central	2	FAC	FAC	Asturias Forum	16 June 2015	29 September 2015	Replaced by Isidro Martínez Oblanca
Fernando Lastra	Central	3	FSA	PSOE	Socialists	16 June 2015	24 June 2019	
Emilio León	Central	1	Podemos	Podemos	Podemos Asturias	16 June 2015	24 June 2019	
Gaspar Llamazares	Central	1	IU/IX	IU/IX	United Left	16 June 2015	8 February 2019	Replaces Jaime Gareth
Pedro Leal	Central	5	FAC	FAC	Asturias Forum	29 October 2015	24 June 2019	Replaces Argimiro Rodríguez. First Secretary
Enrique López	Central	5	Podemos	Podemos	Podemos Asturias	16 June 2015	24 June 2019	
Susana López Ares	Central	7	PPA	PP	People's	16 June 2015	4 February 2016	Replaced by Rafael Alonso
Marcelino Marcos	Western	2	FSA	PSOE	Socialists	16 June 2015	24 June 2019	
Isidro Martínez Oblanca	Central	4	FAC	FAC	Asturias Forum	15 October 2015	4 February 2016	Replaces Esther Landa and replaced by Carmen Fernández
María Concepción Masa	Central	2	IU/IX	IU/IX	United Left	16 June 2015	24 June 2019	
María Josefa Miranda	Central	3	IU/IX	IU/IX	United Left	16 June 2015	24 June 2019	First Vice-President
Lucía Montejo	Central	2	Podemos	Podemos	Podemos Asturias	16 June 2015	24 June 2019	
Carmen Ordieres	Central	4	FSA	PSOE	Socialists	16 June 2015	24 June 2019	
Carmen Pérez	Western	2	PPA	PP	People's	16 June 2015	24 June 2019	
Elsa Pérez	Western	1	FSA	PSOE	Socialists	16 June 2015	24 June 2019	
Héctor Piernavieja	Central	7	Podemos	Podemos	Podemos Asturias	16 June 2015	24 June 2019	
Ignacio Prendes	Central	2	Independent	C's	Citizens	16 June 2015	4 February 2016	First Secretary. Replaced by Luis Armando Fernández
Marta Pulgar	Central	5	IU/IX	IU/IX	United Left	16 June 2015	24 June 2019	
Emma Ramos	Central	3	PPA	PP	People's	16 June 2015	15 September 2017	Replaced by Gloria García
Daniel Ripa	Central	3	Podemos	Podemos	Podemos Asturias	16 June 2015	24 June 2019	
Argimiro Rodríguez	Central	3	FAC	FAC	Asturias Forum	16 June 2015	29 October 2015	Replaced by Pedro Leal
Matías Rodríguez	Western	1	PPA	PP	People's	16 June 2015	24 June 2019	
Pedro de Rueda	Central	4	PPA	PP	People's	16 June 2015	24 June 2019	
Diana Sánchez	Central	2	C's	C's	Citizens	16 June 2015	24 June 2019	
Pedro Sanjurjo	Central	7	FSA	PSOE	Socialists	16 June 2015	24 June 2019	President
Carlos Suárez	Central	2	PPA	PP	People's	16 June 2015	24 June 2019	
Marcelino Torre	Central	9	FSA	PSOE	Socialists	16 June 2015	24 June 2019	
Paula Valero	Eastern	1	Podemos	Podemos	Podemos Asturias	16 June 2015	24 June 2019	
Margarita Vega	Central	8	FSA	PSOE	Socialists	16 June 2015	24 June 2019	
Luis Venta	Eastern	1	PPA	PP	People's	16 June 2015	24 June 2019	
Verónica Vior	Western	3	FSA	PSOE	Socialists	16 June 2015	24 June 2019	
Ovidio Zapico	Central	4	IU/IX	IU/IX	United Left	16 June 2015	24 June 2019	
