= 8th General Junta of the Principality of Asturias =

8th General Junta
←	7th	9th	→
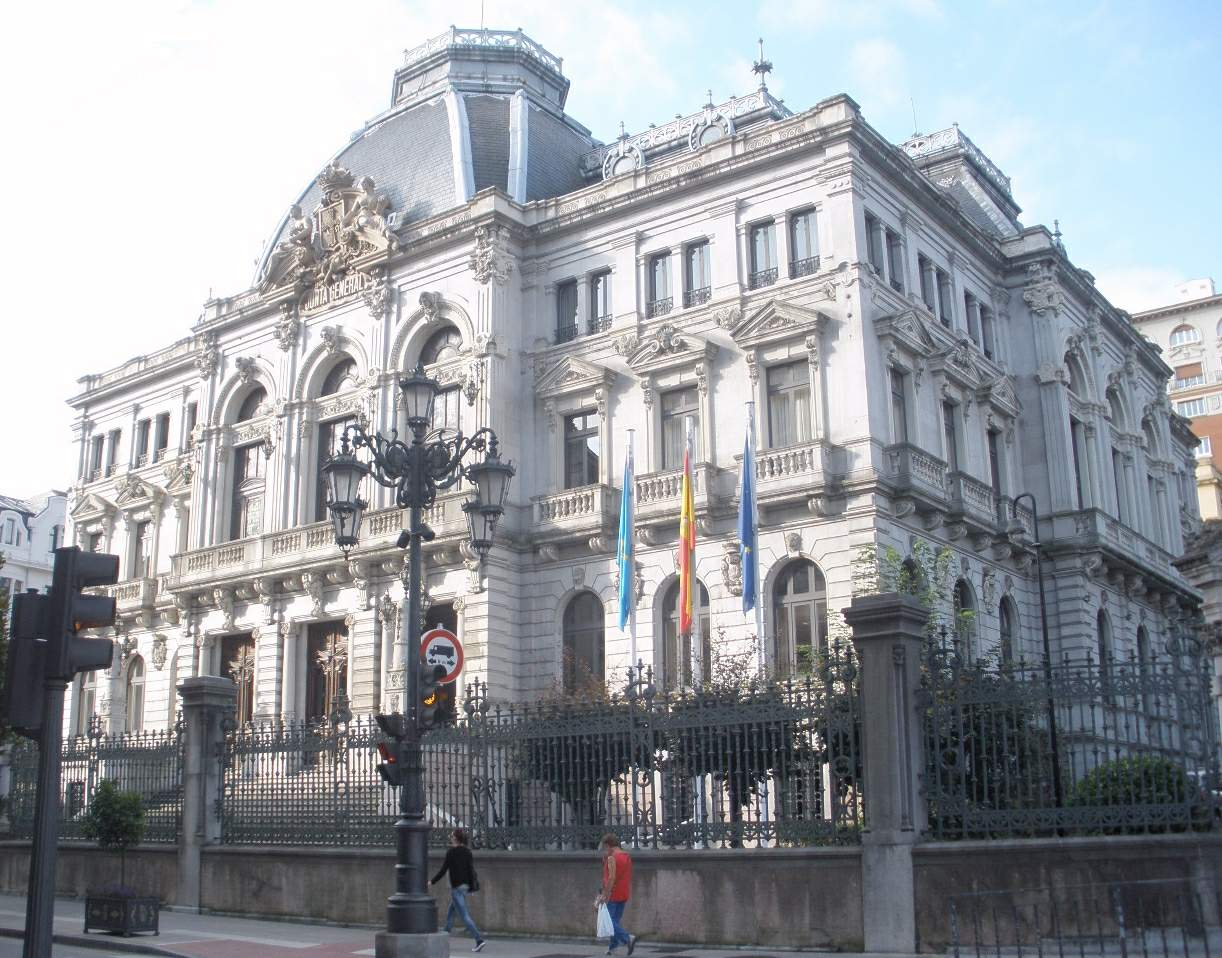

Overview
- Legislative body: General Junta of the Principality of Asturias
- Term: 15 June 2011 – 30 January 2012
- Election: 22 May 2011
- Government: Cascos

Deputies
- Members: 45
- President: Fernando Goñi (PP)
- First Vice-President: Vicente Herranz (PSOE)
- Second Vice-President: Pelayo Roces (FAC)
- First Secretary: María Clara del Pilar Costales (PSOE)
- Second Secretary: Cristina Coto (FAC)

The 8th General Junta was the meeting of the General Junta, the parliament of the Principality of Asturias, with the membership determined by the results of the regional election held on 22 May 2011. The congress met for the first time on 15 June 2011. It is the shortest meeting of the democratic General Junta as it ended after then President of Asturias, Francisco Álvarez-Cascos, called a snap election, being the first non-historic autonomous community (different from Andalusia, Catalonia, the Basque Country or Galicia) to do so.

== Election ==
The 8th Asturian regional election was held on 22 May 2011. At the election, Asturias Forum (FAC), a split from the People's Party (PP), won the most seats despite PSOE obtaining more votes.

Alliance	Votes	%	Seats	+/–
Spanish Socialist Workers' Party (PSOE)	179,619	29.92%	15	▼6
Forum of Citizens (FAC)	178,031	29.66%	16	▲16
People's Party (PP)	119,767	19.95%	10	▼10
United Left of Asturias-The Greens (IU-LV)	61,703	10.28%	4	Steady
Others/blanks	62,588	10.18%	0	
Total	600,274	100.00%	45	Steady

== History ==
The new parliament met for the first time on 15 June 2011. Fernando Goñi (PP) was elected as the president of the General Junta, with the support of PP and PSOE.

President
Candidate		Votes
Fernando Goñi	PP	25
Enrique Álvarez Sostres	FAC	16
Jesús Iglesias	IU-IX	4
Blank		0
Total		45

== Deaths, resignations and suspensions ==
The 8th General Junta has seen the following deaths, resignations and suspensions:

- 20 July 2011 - María Isabel Marqués (Foro) resigned after being appointed Minister of Infrastructures, Territorial Planning and Environment in the Asturian government. Isidro Martínez Oblanca (Foro) resigned after being appointed senator by the General Junta. José Manuel Rivero (Foro) resigned after being appointed Minister of Economy and Employment in the Asturian government. Marcial González (Foro), Lilián María Fernández (Foro) and Josefina María Asunción Collado (Foro) replaced them, respectively, on 29 July 2011.
- 7 December 2011 - Enrique Álvarez Sostres (Foro) resigned after being elected member of the Congress of Deputies. Manuel Fano (Foro) replaced him on 15 December 2011.

== Members ==
Name	Constituency	No.	Party	Alliance	Group	Took office	Left office	Notes
Gervasio Acebedo	Western	2	FAC	FAC	Asturias Forum	15 June 2011	30 January 2012	
María Pilar Alonso	Central	7	FSA	PSOE	Socialist	15 June 2011	30 January 2012	
Maria Teresa Alonso	Central	2	FAC	FAC	Asturias Forum	15 June 2011	30 January 2012	
Francisco Álvarez-Cascos	Central	1	FAC	FAC	Asturias Forum	15 June 2011	30 January 2012	
Álvaro César Álvarez	Central	9	FSA	PSOE	Socialist	15 June 2011	30 January 2012	
María Jesús Álvarez	Western	2	FSA	PSOE	Socialist	15 June 2011	30 January 2012	
María Mercedes Álvarez	Central	4	FSA	PSOE	Socialist	15 June 2011	30 January 2012	
Enrique Álvarez	Central	5	FAC	FAC	Asturias Forum	15 June 2011	7 December 2011	Replaced by Josefina Collado
Joaquín Aréstegui	Central	3	PPA	PP	People's	15 June 2011	30 January 2012	
Ana María Barrientos	Central	7	PPA	PP	People's	15 June 2011	30 January 2012	
Josefina María Asunción Collado	Central	15	FAC	FAC	Asturias Forum	29 July 2011	30 January 2012	Replaces José Manuel
María Clara del Pilar Costales	Central	10	FSA	PSOE	Socialist	15 June 2011	30 January 2012	
Cristina Coto	Central	10	FAC	FAC	Asturias Forum	15 June 2011	30 January 2012	
Balbino Dosantos	Central	8	FSA	PSOE	Socialist	15 June 2011	30 January 2012	
Benigno Enríquez	Central	6	FSA	PSOE	Socialist	15 June 2011	30 January 2012	
Manuel Fano	Central	16	FAC	FAC	Asturias Forum	7 December 2011	30 January 2012	Replaces Enrique Álvarez
Costantino Fernández	Central	11	FSA	PSOE	Socialist	15 June 2011	30 January 2012	
Javier Fernández	Central	1	FSA	PSOE	Socialist	15 June 2011	30 January 2012	
Lilián María Fernández	Central	14	FAC	FAC	Asturias Forum	29 July 2011	30 January 2012	Replaces Isidro Martínez
María del Carmen Fernández	Central	9	FAC	FAC	Asturias Forum	15 June 2011	30 January 2012	
Carlos Galcerán	Central	6	PPA	PP	People's	15 June 2011	30 January 2012	
Fernando Goñi	Central	2	PPA	PP	People's	15 June 2011	30 January 2012	
Juan Basilio González	Eastern	1	PPA	PP	People's	15 June 2011	30 January 2012	
Marcial González	Western	3	FAC	FAC	Asturias Forum	29 July 2011	30 January 2012	Replaces María Isabel Marqués
Jesús Gutierrez	Central	5	FSA	PSOE	Socialist	15 June 2011	30 January 2012	
Vicente Herranz	Central	3	FSA	PSOE	Socialist	15 June 2011	30 January 2012	
Marina Huerta	Eastern	1	FAC	FAC	Asturias Forum	15 June 2011	30 January 2012	
Jesús Enrique Iglesias	Central	1	IU/IX	IU-LV	United Left	15 June 2011	30 January 2012	
Esther Landa	Central	4	FAC	FAC	Asturias Forum	15 June 2011	30 January 2012	
Adriana Lastra	Eastern	2	FSA	PSOE	Socialist	15 June 2011	30 January 2012	
Fernando Lastra	Western	1	FSA	PSOE	Socialist	15 June 2011	30 January 2012	
Susana López	Central	4	PPA	PP	People's	15 June 2011	30 January 2012	
María Isabel Marqués	Western	1	FAC	FAC	Asturias Forum	15 June 2011	20 July 2011	Replaced by Marcial González
Manuel Aurelio Martín	Central	3	IU/IX	IU-LV	United Left	15 June 2011	30 January 2012	
Noemí Martín	Central	2	IU/IX	IU-LV	United Left	15 June 2011	30 January 2012	
José Antonio Martínez	Central	12	FAC	FAC	Asturias Forum	15 June 2011	30 January 2012	
Isidro Martínez	Central	6	FAC	FAC	Asturias Forum	15 June 2011	20 July 2011	Replaced by Lilián María Fernández
Juan Sancho Michell	Central	8	FAC	FAC	Asturias Forum	15 June 2011	30 January 2012	
Ana Rosa Migoya	Eastern	1	FSA	PSOE	Socialist	15 June 2011	30 January 2012	
Manuel Peña	Central	7	FAC	FAC	Asturias Forum	15 June 2011	30 January 2012	
María Isabel Perez-Espinosa	Central	1	PPA	PP	People's	15 June 2011	30 January 2012	
María José Ramos	Central	2	FSA	PSOE	Socialist	15 June 2011	30 January 2012	
José Manuel Riviero	Central	11	FAC	FAC	Asturias Forum	15 June 2011	20 July 2011	Replaced by Josefina María Asunción Collado
Pelayo Roces	Central	3	FAC	FAC	Asturias Forum	15 June 2011	30 January 2012	
Matías Rodríguez	Western	2	PPA	PP	People's	15 June 2011	30 January 2012	
Alfonso Román	Western	1	PPA	PP	People's	15 June 2011	30 January 2012	
Fidel Sánchez	Central	2	FAC	FAC	Asturias Forum	15 June 2011	30 January 2012	
Emilia Vázquez	Central	4	IU/IX	IU-LV	United Left	15 June 2011	30 January 2012	
