= Second government of Javier Fernández =

Second Fernández government
- Council of Government of Asturias

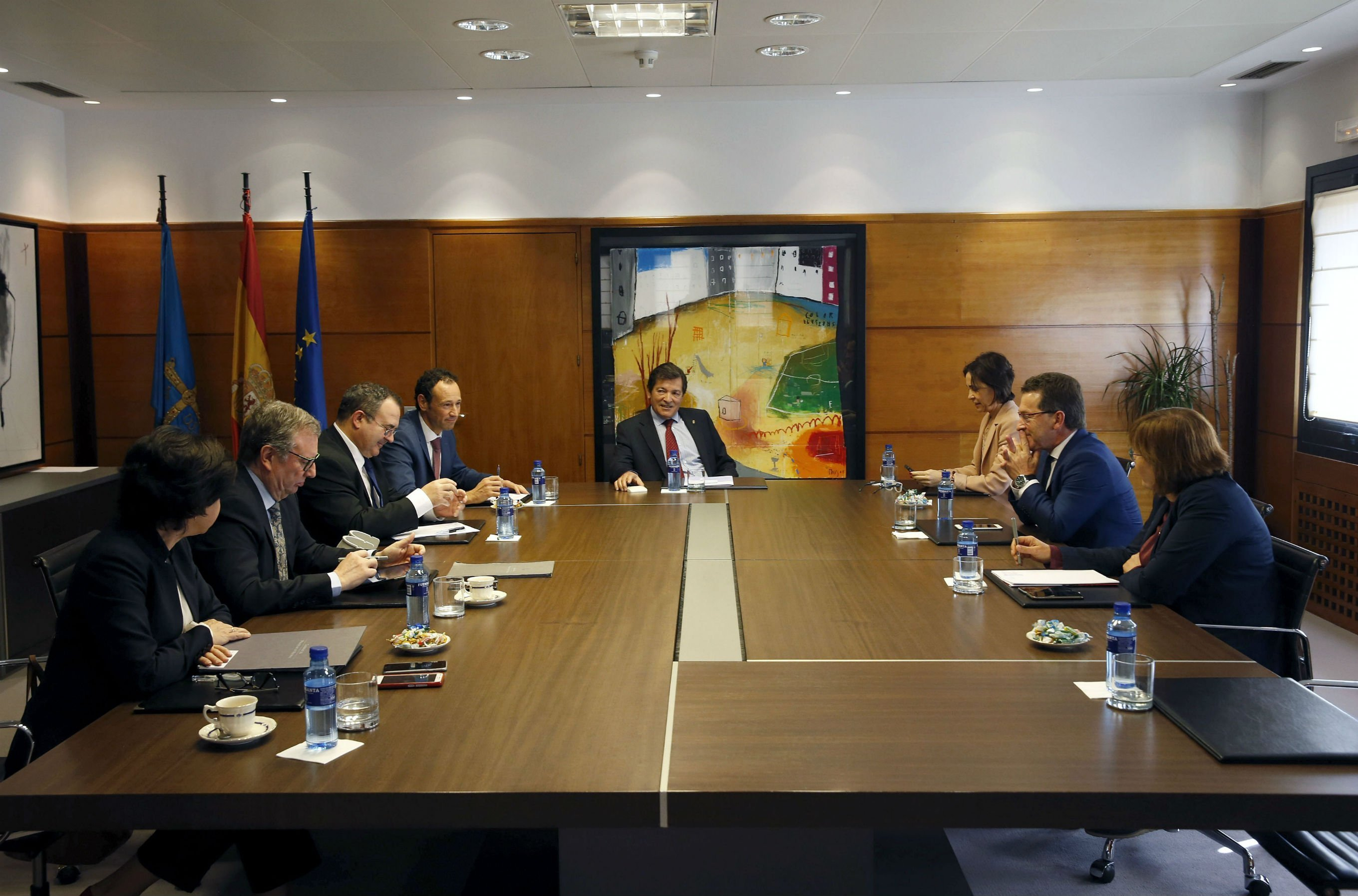
- Meeting of the Council of Government of Asturias, May 20, 2019, chaired by Javier Fernández, President of the Principality of Asturias
- Date formed: 29 July 2015
- Date dissolved: 22 July 2019

People and organisations
- Head of government: Javier Fernández
- No. of ministers: 9
- Member party: FSA-PSOE
- Status in legislature: Minority government
- Opposition party: PP
- Opposition leader: Mercedes Fernández

History
- Election: 2015 regional election
- Legislature term: 10th General Junta (2015–2019)
- Predecessor: Fernández I
- Successor: Barbón

The Second Javier Fernández government was the regional government of Asturias led by President Javier Fernández. It was formed in July 2015 after the regional election.

== Investiture ==
Investiture
Ballot →	1 July 2015		3 July 2015		21 July 2015	
Required majority →	23 out of 45		Simple		Simple	
Javier Fernández (PSOE): • PSOE (14); • IU/IX (5) (on 21 Jul)	14 / 45	☒	14 / 45	☒	19 / 45	check
Mercedes Fernández (PP): • PP (11); • FAC (3) (from 3 Jul)	11 / 45	☒	14 / 45	☒	14 / 45	☒
Emilio León (Podemos): • Podemos (9) (on 1 Jul)	9 / 45	☒	Eliminated			
Abstentions: • Podemos (9) (from 3 Jul); • IU/IX (5) (until 3 Jul); • C's (3)	11 / 45		17 / 45		12 / 45	
Absentees	0 / 45		0 / 45		0 / 45	

== Council of Government ==
← Fernández II Government → (29 July 2015 – 25 July 2019)
Office	Name	Term of office	^{Ref.}
President	Javier Fernández	22 July 2015 – 16 July 2019	
Minister of Presidency and Citizen Participation	Guillermo Martínez	29 July 2015 – 25 July 2019	
Minister of Education and Culture	Genaro Alonso	29 July 2015 – 25 July 2019	
Minister of Rural Development and Natural Resources	María Jesús Álvarez	29 July 2015 – 25 July 2019	
Minister of Employment, Industry and Tourism	Francisco Blanco	29 July 2015 – 26 May 2017	
Minister of Finance and Public Sector	María Dolores Carcedo	29 July 2015 – 25 July 2019	
Minister of Health	Francisco del Busto	29 July 2015 – 25 July 2019	
Minister of Infrastructures, Territorial Planning and Environment	Belén Fernández	29 July 2015 – 23 June 2017	
Minister of Social Services and Rights	Pilar Varela	29 July 2015 – 25 July 2019	
=== Changes May 2017 ===
Minister of Employment, Industry and Tourism	Isaac Pola	26 May 2017 – 25 July 2019	
=== Changes June 2017 ===
Minister of Infrastructures, Territorial Planning and Environment	Fernando Lastra	23 June 2017 – 25 July 2019	
