= Government of Francisco Álvarez-Cascos =

- Council of Government of Asturias

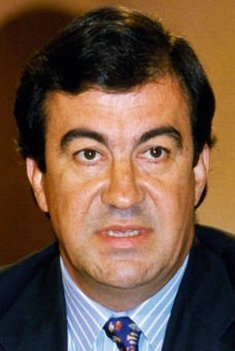
- Date formed: 15 July 2011
- Date dissolved: 26 May 2012

People and organisations
- Head of government: Francisco Álvarez-Cascos
- No. of ministers: 10
- Member party: Asturias Forum
- Status in legislature: Minority government
- Opposition party: Asturian Socialist Federation
- Opposition leader: Javier Fernández

History
- Election: 2011 regional election
- Legislature term: 8th General Junta (2011–2012)
- Predecessor: Areces III
- Successor: Fernández I

The Cascos government was the regional government of Asturias led by President Francisco Álvarez Cascos. It was formed in July 2011 after the regional election.

After six months of minority government and being his regional budget for 2012 was rejected. This blocked situation forced him to resign on 30 January 2012, called for new elections to be held on 25 March, thus ending the shortest legislature in the General Junta ever.

== Investiture ==
Investiture
Ballot →	13 July 2011		15 July 2011	
Required majority →	23 out of 45		Simple	
Francisco Álvarez-Cascos (FAC): • FAC (16)	16 / 45	☒	16 / 45	check
Abstentions: • PSOE (15); • PP (10); • IU–LV (4)	29 / 45		29 / 45	
Absentees	0 / 45		0 / 45	

== Council of Government ==
← Cascos Government → (16 July 2011 – 26 May 2012)
Office	Name	Term of office	^{Ref.}
President	Francisco Álvarez-Cascos	15 July 2011 – 24 May 2012	
Minister of Presidency	Florentino Alonso (es)	16 July 2011 – 26 May 2012	
Minister of Education and Universities	Ana Isabel Álvarez	16 July 2011 – 26 May 2012	
Minister of Culture and Sport	Emilio Marcos	16 July 2011 – 26 May 2012	
Minister of Agro Labour and Authochtonous Resources	Albano Longo	16 July 2011 – 26 May 2012	
Minister of Economy and Employment	José Manuel Rivero (es)	16 July 2011 – 26 May 2012	
Minister of Finance and Public Sector	Ramón del Riego	16 July 2011 – 26 May 2012	
Minister of Health	José María Nava-Osorio	16 July 2011 – 26 May 2012	
Minister of Infrastructures, Territorial Planning and Environment	María Isabel Marqués	16 July 2011 – 26 May 2012	
Minister of Social Welfare and Equality	Paloma Menéndez	16 July 2011 – 26 May 2012	
