= First government of Adrián Barbón =

Government of Adrián Barbón
- Government of the Principality of Asturias

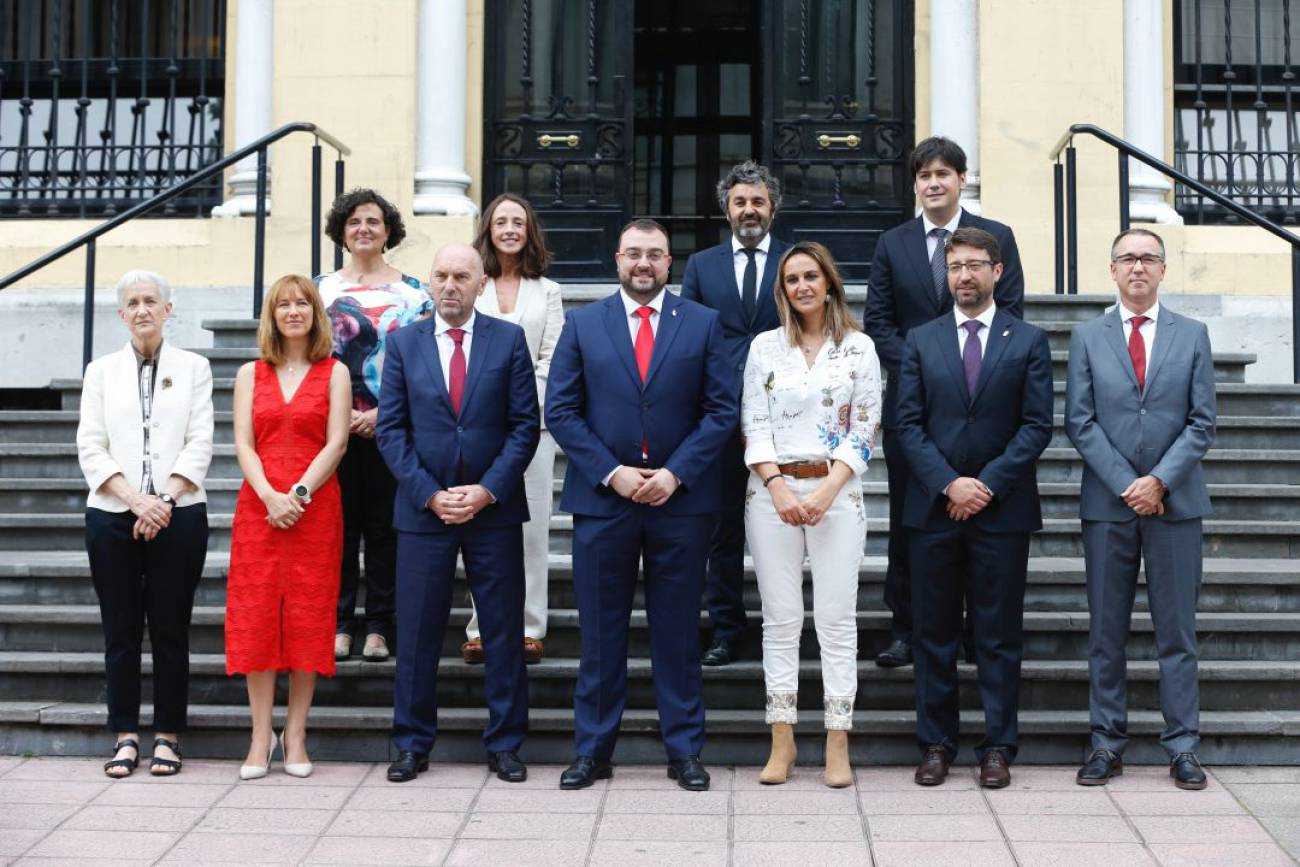
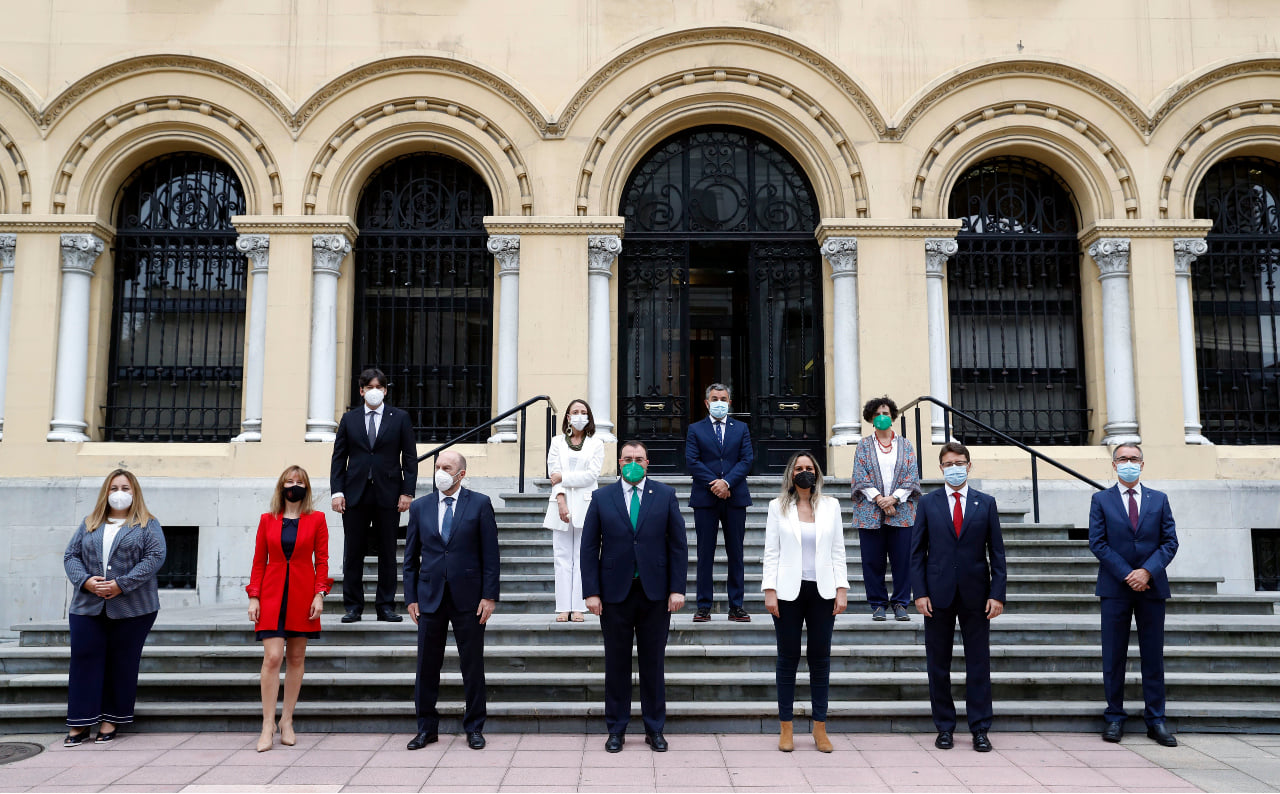
- The government in July 2019 (top) and July 2021 (bottom).
- Date formed: 25 July 2019
- Date dissolved: 31 July 2023

People and organisations
- Monarch: Felipe VI
- President: Adrián Barbón
- Vice President: Juan Cofiño
- No. of ministers: 10 (Note: Does not include the President.)
- Total no. of members: 11
- Member party: PSOE
- Status in legislature: Minority government
- Opposition party: PP
- Opposition leader: Teresa Mallada (until December 2021); Beatriz Polledo (since January 2022)

History
- Election: 2019 regional election
- Legislature term: 11th General Junta
- Budget: 2020, 2021, 2022, 2023
- Predecessor: Fernández II
- Successor: Barbón II

The first government of Adrián Barbón was formed on 25 July 2019, following the latter's election as President of the Principality of Asturias by the General Junta of the Principality of Asturias on 15 July and his swearing-in on 17 July, as a result of the Spanish Socialist Workers' Party (PSOE) emerging as the largest parliamentary force at the 2019 regional election. It succeeded the second Fernández government and was the incumbent Government of the Principality of Asturias between 25 July 2019 and 31 July 2023, a total of 1,467 days, or 4 years and 6 days.

The cabinet comprised members of the PSOE and a number of independents.

== Investiture ==
Investiture
Ballot →	12 July 2019		15 July 2019	
Required majority →	23 out of 45		Simple	
Adrián Barbón (PSOE): • PSOE (20); • IU–IAS (2)	22 / 45	☒	22 / 45	check
Abstentions: • PP (10); • Cs (5); • Podemos (4); • FAC (2); • Vox (2)	23 / 45		23 / 45	
Absentees	0 / 45		0 / 45	

== Cabinet changes ==
Barbón's government saw a number of cabinet changes during its tenure:

- On 24 June 2020, the ministries of Infrastructures, Environment and Climatic Change and the Rural Development, Agro-livestocks and Fisheries were reorganized into the Regional Administration, Environment and Climatic Change and the Rural Affairs and Territorial Cohesion portfolios, respectively, with their previous officeholders remaining in their posts.
- On 25 July 2021, it was announced that Lydia Espina would replace Carmen Suárez as minister of Education, a move which was formalized on 29 July.

== Council of Government ==
The Council of Government of the Principality of Asturias is structured into the offices for the president, the vice president and 10 ministries.

← Barbón Government → (25 July 2019 – present)
Portfolio	Name	Party	Took office	Left office	Ref.
President	Adrián Barbón	PSOE	17 July 2019	31 July 2023	
Vice President; Minister of Infrastructures, Environment and Climatic Change	Juan Cofiño	PSOE	25 July 2019	24 June 2020	
Minister of the Presidency	Rita Camblor	PSOE	25 July 2019	31 July 2023	
Minister of Finance	Ana Cárcaba	PSOE (Ind.)	25 July 2019	31 July 2023	
Minister of Industry, Employment and Economic Promotion	Enrique Fernández Rodríguez	PSOE	25 July 2019	31 July 2023	
Minister of Education	Carmen Suárez	PSOE (Ind.)	25 July 2019	29 July 2021	
Minister of Health	Pablo Fernández Muñiz	PSOE	25 July 2019	31 July 2023	
Minister of Social Rights and Welfare	Melania Álvarez	PSOE	25 July 2019	31 July 2023	
Minister of Rural Development, Agro-livestocks and Fisheries	Alejandro Calvo	PSOE	25 July 2019	24 June 2020	
Minister of Culture, Language Policy and Tourism	Berta Piñán	PSOE (Ind.)	25 July 2019	31 July 2023	
Minister of Science, Innovation and University	Borja Sánchez	PSOE	25 July 2019	31 July 2023	
=== Changes June 2020 ===
Portfolio	Name	Party	Took office	Left office	Ref.
Vice President; Minister of Regional Administration, Environment and Climatic Change	Juan Cofiño	PSOE	24 June 2020	31 July 2023	
Minister of Rural Affairs and Territorial Cohesion	Alejandro Calvo	PSOE	24 June 2020	31 July 2023	
=== Changes July 2021 ===
Portfolio	Name	Party	Took office	Left office	Ref.
Minister of Education	Lydia Espina	PSOE	29 July 2021	31 July 2023	

== Notes ==
Preceded by Fernández II	Government of the Principality of Asturias; 2019–present	Incumbent
