= Areces government =

Vicente Álvarez Areces formed the Areces government on 20 July 1999 after passing the investiture at the General Junta of the Principality of Asturias to form a government as a result of the Asturian Socialist Federation's victory at the 1999 regional election. Areces was nominated again in 2003 and 2007 for a second and third cabinet.

== First Areces government (1999–2003) ==
First Areces government
- Council of Government of Asturias
- Incumbent
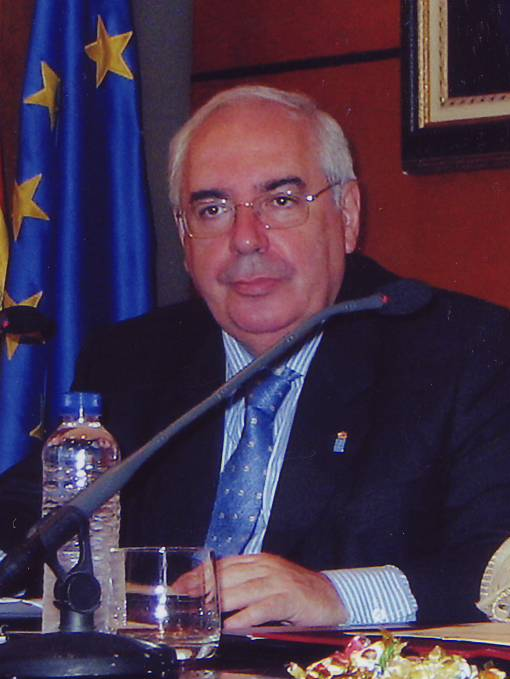
- Date formed: 23 July 1999
- Date dissolved: 7 July 2003

People and organisations
- Head of government: Vicente Álvarez Areces
- No. of ministers: 12
- Member party: Asturian Socialist Federation
- Status in legislature: Majority government
- Opposition party: People's Party of Asturias
- Opposition leader: Ovidio Sánchez

History
- Election: 1999 regional election
- Legislature term: 5th General Junta (1999–2003)
- Predecessor: Marqués
- Successor: Areces II

The First Vicente Álvarez Areces government was the first regional government of Asturias led by President Vicente Álvarez Areces. It was formed in July 1999 after the regional election.

=== Investiture ===
Investiture; Vicente Álvarez Areces (PSOE)
Ballot →	20 July 1999
Required majority →	23 out of 45
Yes: • PSOE (24)	24 / 45
No: • PP (15); • IU (3); • URAS (3)	21 / 45
Abstentions	0 / 45

=== Composition ===
← I Areces government → (23 July 1999 – 7 July 2003)
Office	Name	Term of office	^{Ref.}
President	Vicente Álvarez Areces	20 July 1999 – 7 July 2003	
Minister of Presidency	María José Ramos (es)	23 July 1999 – 7 July 2003	
Minister of Public Administrations and European Affairs	Luis Iturrioz	23 July 1999 – 10 October 2001	
Minister of Finance	Elena Carantoña	23 July 1999 – 3 August 2000	
Minister of Education and Culture	Javier Fernández Vallina	23 July 1999 – 7 July 2003	
Minister of Social Affairs	José García González (es)	23 July 1999 – 7 July 2003	
Minister of Health and Health Services	Francisco Sevilla	23 July 1999 – 7 July 2003	
Minister of Infrastructures and Territorial Policy	Juan Ramón García Secades	23 July 1999 – 7 July 2003	
Minister of the Environment	Herminio Sastre	23 July 1999 – 7 July 2003	
Minister of Rural Affairs and Fisheries	Santiago Menéndez de Luarca	23 July 1999 – 7 July 2003	
Minister of Industry, Commerce and Tourism	Javier Fernández	23 July 1999 – 10 November 2000	
Minister of Labor and Promotion of Employment	Angelina Álvarez	23 July 1999 – 10 October 2001	
==== Changes August 2000 ====
Minister of Finance	Jaime Rabanal (es)	30 August 2000 – 7 July 2003	
==== Changes November 2000 ====
Minister of Industry, Commerce and Tourism	Jesús Urrutia	10 November 2000 – 7 July 2003	
==== Changes October 2001 ====
Minister of Public Administrations and European Affairs	Angelina Álvarez	10 October 2001 – 7 July 2003	
Minister of Labor and Promotion of Employment	Graciano Torre	10 October 2001 – 7 July 2003	

== Second Areces government (2003–2007) ==
Second Areces government
- Council of Government of Asturias

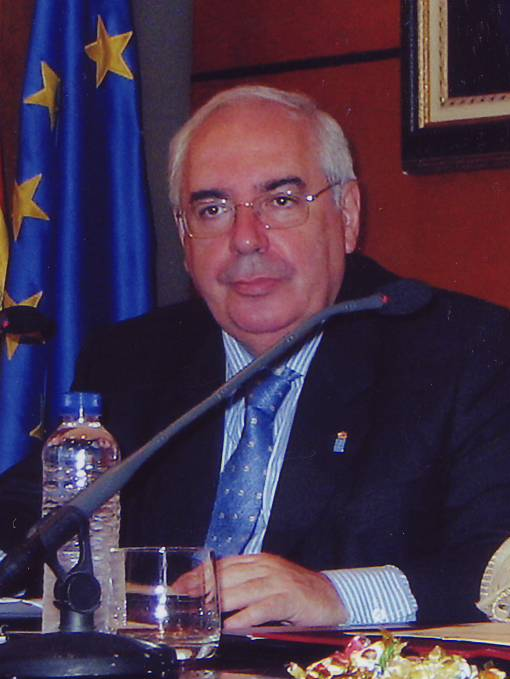
- Date formed: 7 July 2003
- Date dissolved: 12 July 2007

People and organisations
- Head of government: Vicente Álvarez Areces
- No. of ministers: 11
- Member party: Asturian Socialist Federation United Left of Asturias
- Status in legislature: Majority coalition
- Opposition party: People's Party
- Opposition leader: Ovidio Sánchez

History
- Election: 2003 regional election
- Legislature term: 6th General Junta (2003–2007)
- Predecessor: Areces I
- Successor: Areces III

The Second Areces government is the incumbent regional government of Asturias led by President Vicente Álvarez Areces. It was formed in July 2003 after the regional election.

=== Investiture ===
Investiture; Vicente Álvarez Areces (PSOE)
Ballot →	1 July 2003
Required majority →	23 out of 45
Yes: • PSOE (22); • IU–BA (4)	26 / 45
No: • PP (19)	19 / 45
Abstentions	0 / 45

=== Composition ===
← II Areces government → (7 July 2003 – 12 July 2007)
Office	Name	Term of office	^{Ref.}
President	Vicente Álvarez Areces	4 July 2003 – 12 July 2007	
Minister of Presidency	María José Ramos (es)	7 July 2003 – 12 July 2007	
Minister of Education and Science	José Luis Iglesias	7 July 2003 – 12 July 2007	
Minister of Economy and Public Administrations	Jaime Rabanal (es)	7 July 2003 – 12 July 2007	
Minister of Culture, Social Communication and Tourism	Ana Rosa Migoya	7 July 2003 – 12 July 2007	
Minister of Housing and Social Welfare	Laura González (es)	7 July 2003 – 12 July 2007	
Minister of Health and Health Services	Rafael Sariego	7 July 2003 – 12 July 2007	
Minister of the Environment, Territorial Policy and Infrastructures	Francisco González	7 July 2003 – 12 July 2007	
Minister of Rural Affairs and Fisheries	Servanda García	7 July 2003 – 12 July 2007	
Minister of Industry and Employment	Graciano Torre	7 July 2003 – 12 July 2007	
Minister of Justice, Public Security and Foreign Affairs	Francisco Javier García Valledor (es)	7 July 2003 – 12 July 2007	

== Third Areces government (2007–2011) ==
Third Areces government
- Council of Government of Asturias
- Incumbent
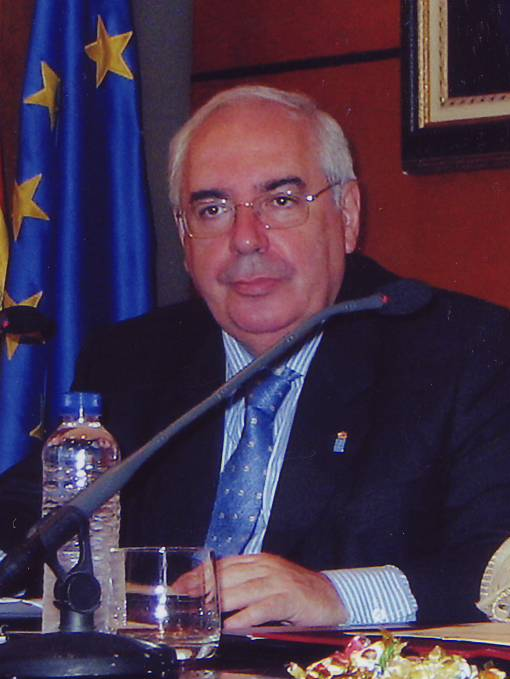
- Date formed: 12 July 2007
- Date dissolved: 16 July 2011

People and organisations
- Head of government: Vicente Álvarez Areces
- No. of ministers: 11
- Member party: Asturian Socialist Federation United Left of Asturias
- Status in legislature: Majority government
- Opposition party: People's Party
- Opposition leader: Ovidio Sánchez

History
- Election: 2007 regional election
- Legislature term: 7th General Junta (2007–2011)
- Predecessor: Areces II
- Successor: Cascos

The Third Areces government was the regional government of Asturias led by President Vicente Álvarez Areces. It was formed in 2007 after the regional election.

In November 2008, he made a restructuring of his government, by changing several Ministries.

=== Investiture ===
Investiture; Vicente Álvarez Areces (PSOE)
Ballot →	10 July 2007
Required majority →	23 out of 45
Yes: • PSOE (21); • IU–BA–LV (4)	25 / 45
No: • PP (20)	20 / 45
Abstentions	0 / 45

=== Composition ===
← III Areces government → (12 July 2007 – 16 July 2011)
Office	Name	Term of office	^{Ref.}
President	Vicente Álvarez Areces	11 July 2007 – 15 July 2011	
Minister of Presidency, Justice and Equality	María José Ramos (es)	12 July 2007 – 16 July 2011	
Minister of Public Administrations	Ana Rosa Migoya	12 July 2007 – 16 July 2011	
Spokesperson of the Government	Ana Rosa Migoya	12 July 2007 – 16 July 2011	
Minister of Economy and European Affairs	Jaime Rabanal (es)	12 July 2007 – 26 November 2008	
Minister of Education and Science	José Luis Iglesias	12 July 2007 – 4 August 2010	
Minister of Culture and Tourism	Encarnación Rodríguez	12 July 2007 – 26 November 2008	
Minister of Social Welfare	Pilar Rodríguez	12 July 2007 – 1 September 2008	
Minister of Health and Health Services	José Ramón Quirós (es)	12 July 2007 – 16 July 2011	
Minister of Infrastructures, Territorial Policy and Housing	Francisco González	12 July 2007 – 26 November 2008	
Minister of the Environment and Rural Development	Belén Fernández	12 July 2007 – 26 November 2008	
Minister of Industry and Employment	Graciano Torre	12 July 2007 – 16 July 2011	
==== Changes September 2008 ====
Minister of Social Welfare	Teresa Ordiz	1 September 2008 – 26 November 2008	
==== Changes November 2008 ====
Minister of Economy and Finance	Jaime Rabanal (es)	26 November 2008 – 16 July 2011	
Minister of Culture and Tourism	Mercedes Álvarez	26 November 2008 – 16 July 2011	
Minister of Social Welfare and Housing	Noemí Martín	26 November 2008 – 16 July 2011	
Minister of the Environment, Territorial Planning and Infrastructures	Francisco González	26 November 2008 – 16 July 2011	
Minister of Rural Affairs and Fisheries	Aurelio Martín	26 November 2008 – 16 July 2011	
==== Changes August 2010 ====
Minister of Education and Science	Herminio Sastre	5 August 2010 – 16 July 2011	
