= Sergio Marqués Fernández =

Spanish politician and lawyer

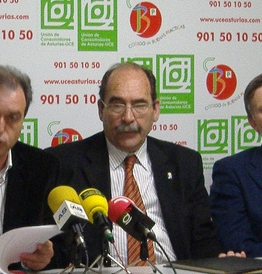

5th President of the Principality of Asturias
- In office 11 July 1995 – 21 July 1999
- Monarch: Juan Carlos I
- Preceded by: Antonio Trevín
- Succeeded by: Vicente Álvarez Areces

Personal details
- Born: 4 August 1946 Gijón, Asturias, Spain
- Died: 8 May 2012 (aged 65) Gijón, Asturias, Spain
- Party: PP, URAS
- Spouse: Elena Prendes

Sergio Marqués Fernández (4 August 1946 – 8 May 2012) was a Spanish politician and lawyer. Marques served as the President of the Principality of Asturias from 1995 to 1999. He is the only member of the People's Party (PP) to have held the presidency of Asturias to date. In 1999, Marques founded Unión Renovadora Asturiana (URAS), a regional political party based in Asturias.

== Biography ==
=== Personal life and career ===
Marqués was born on 4 August 1946. He graduated from the University of Oviedo in 1967. He became a lawyer, practicing at firms in Gijón and Oviedo during the 1970s. He also became the director of a metal company from 1973 to 1979. He then moved to Puerto Rico, where he lived from 1979 to 1983. He moved back to Spain in 1983 to become the commercial director of the firm, Isidro Jover y Compañía, in Barcelona.

Marques was involved with People's Party (PP) from the time of the party's establishment in 1977. he was appointed to the PP regional executive committee in 1987 and was elected to the General Council of the Principality of Asturias that same year. He became the chairman of the PP's finance committee in Asturias in 1991. He further became the spokesman of the People's Party in 1993. He elected the Vice President of Asturias at the autonomous community's tenth regional congress in September 1993.

=== President of Asturias ===
In the May 1995 Asturias General Council election, the PP under Marqués won 21 of the 45 seats in the General Council. The Spanish Socialist Workers' Party (PSOE) won 17 seats, while the United Left and Partido Asturianista won a combined six seats. The PSOE failed to form a coalition government with the smaller parties due to disagreements. Therefore, Marqués formed the new PP government with a simple majority in the council. He was sworn in as president on 11 July 1995.

The regional Asturian PP party became plagued by infighting by 1998. Marqués came under attack by members of the PP, both nationally and within Asturias. Oviedo Mayor Gabino de Lorenzo, a member of the PP, accused Marqués of ignoring both the party and the needs of the city. The First Deputy Prime Minister of Spain, Francisco Álvarez-Cascos, was also condemned Marqués for lack of coordination with the party. A wave of resignations from Marqués' government followed the PP's withdrawal of confidence. The first resignation was Pedro Muñiz, the regional director of sports and youth. The Asturias General Council rejected a censure motion against Marqués on 10 March 1999, which had been introduced by members of the PP. Despite the opposition from members of the PP, Marqués finished his entire term as President with the support of only four members of the General Council.

=== Post-presidency ===
Marqués's ongoing dispute and crisis with the PP led him to found the Asturian Renewal Union (URAS) in December 1998. The URAS, now under Marques, won three seats in June 1999, Asturias General Council election while the PP won 15 seats, down from 21 in 1995. However, the PSOE won a clear majority of 24 seats in the election. Marqués retained his seat in the 1999 election, under the banner of the new URAS, serving in the council until 2003.

Marques ran again in the May 2003 election, but the URAS failed to win seats in the General Council. He remained President of the Asturian Renewal Union until November 2007.

Sergio Marqués died on 8 May 2012.

Preceded by Antonio Trevín	President of the Principality of Asturias; 1995–1999	Succeeded by Vicente Álvarez Areces
