= First government of Javier Fernández =

First Javier Fernández government
- Council of Government of Asturias
- Incumbent
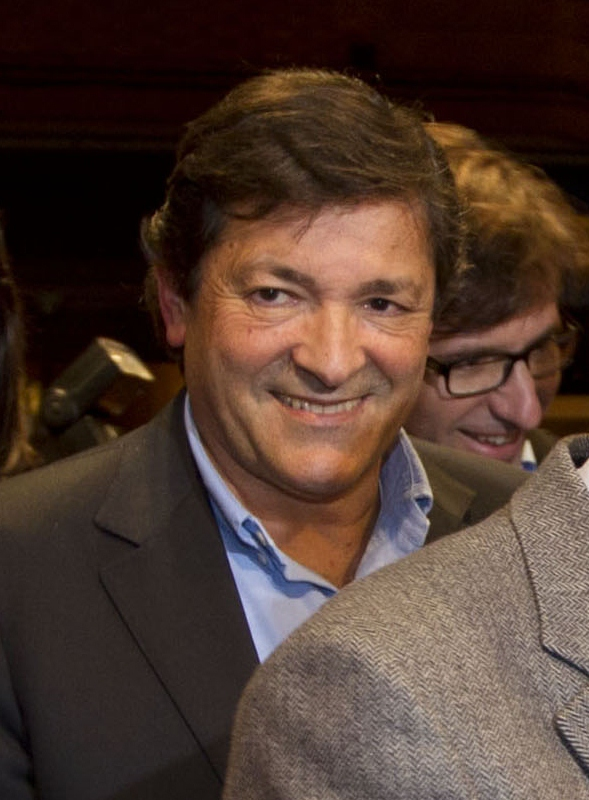
- Date formed: 26 May 2012
- Date dissolved: 29 July 2015

People and organisations
- Head of government: Javier Fernández
- No. of ministers: 9
- Member party: FSA-PSOE
- Status in legislature: Minority government
- Opposition party: FAC
- Opposition leader: Francisco Álvarez-Cascos

History
- Election: 2012 regional election
- Legislature term: 9th General Junta (2012–2015)
- Predecessor: Cascos
- Successor: Fernández II

The First Javier Fernández government was the first regional government of Asturias led by President Javier Fernández. It was formed in May 2012 after the regional election.

== Investiture ==
Investiture
Ballot →	23 May 2012	
Required majority →	23 out of 45	
Javier Fernández (PSOE): • PSOE (17); • IU/IX (5); • UPyD (1)	23 / 45	check
Abstentions: • FAC (12); • PP (10)	22 / 45	
Absentees	0 / 45	

== Council of Government ==
← Fernández I Government → (26 May 2012 – 29 July 2015)
Office	Name	Term of office	^{Ref.}
President	Javier Fernández	24 May 2012 – 22 July 2015	
Minister of Presidency and Citizen Participation	Guillermo Martínez	26 May 2012 – 29 July 2015	
Minister of Education, Culture and Sport	Ana González (es)	26 May 2012 – 29 July 2015	
Minister of Agro Labour and Authochtonous Resources	María Jesús Álvarez	26 May 2012 – 29 July 2015	
Minister of Economy and Employment	Graciano Torre	26 May 2012 – 29 July 2015	
Minister of Finance and Public Sector	María Dolores Carcedo	26 May 2012 – 29 July 2015	
Minister of Health	Faustino Blanco	26 May 2012 – 29 July 2015	
Minister of Infrastructures, Territorial Planning and Environment	Belén Fernández	26 May 2012 – 29 July 2015	
Minister of Social Welfare and Housing	María Esther Díaz	26 May 2012 – 28 November 2014	
=== Changes November 2014 ===
Minister of Social Welfare and Housing	Graciela Blanco	28 November 2014 – 29 July 2015	
