= José García González =

Spanish politician and psychiatrist (1938–2020)

José García González (Vega del Rey, Lena, 28 March 1938 – 23 March 2020) was a Spanish psychiatrist and neurologist known for having obtained political attributions in the Council of Government of the Principality of Asturias, along with the Spanish Socialist Workers' Party (PSOE).

== Biography ==
García González got a degree in Medical Sciences in the University of Granada, with a thesis named Historia social de la psiquiatría en España (Social history of psychiatry in Spain), which was expanded into Germany and Switzerland, where he, later on, worked as a psychiatrist. García González dedicated most of his professional career to the Social Psychiatry and wrote many publications about it.

He also participated actively in the manifestations of psychiatric transformation in the 1970s, of the Psychiatric hospital of Oviedo, and of the Psychiatric Sanatory of Conxo, in Santiago de Compostela, where he obtained progression in many areas. He also collaborated with the creation of the MIR System of Specialization, established in the 1970s.

García González was a member of the expert's commission which elaboured an inform for the ministerial commission for the psychiatric reform and obtained the title of "President of the Spanish Association of Neuropsychiatry", which ran from 1983 to 1986. He was also responsible for the establishment of the Mental Health Service of the Asturian General Hospital

== Political activity ==
Thanks to the pre-autonomic constitution of the Principality of Asturias presided over by Rafael Fernández Álvarez in the year 1982, García González was designated Regional director of mental health, and revalidated his position in 1983, as President of the Principality of Asturias Pedro de Silva.

García González stayed in office until 1987. His labour in this responsibility settled the basis and organization for the Psychiatric reform in the principality. This was considered by the World Health Organization, after he chose it as a collaborative center for that specialization

Time after, between 1991 and 1995, García González, was elected Counselor of Sanity and Social Services, during the presidencies of Juan Luis Rodríguez-Vigil (1991-93) and Antonio Trevín (1993-95). Later on, in 1999, after Vicente Álvarez Areces was elected president of the principality, he became Counselor of Social business, a position he held until 2003.

García González died on 23 March 2020, at age 81 or 82.
