= Berta Piñán =

Spanish writer

Berta Piñán Suárez
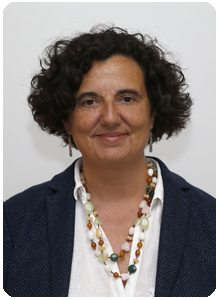

Minister, Consejería de Cultura, Política Lingüística y Turismo del Principado de Asturias
- Incumbent
- Assumed office July 25, 2019

Personal details
- Born: March 26, 1963 (age 63) Caño, Cangas de Onís, Spain
- Education: University of Oviedo
- Occupation: writer; poet; politician
- Awards: Premio de Poesía Teodoro Cuesta (1991); Premio de narraciones Trabe (1995)

Berta Piñán Suárez (Caño, Cangas de Onís, Spain, March 26, 1963) is an Asturian writer, professor of Spanish Language and Literature, full member of the Academy of the Asturian Language, and since July 25, 2019, Minister of Consejería de Cultura, Política Lingüística y Turismo del Principado de Asturias (Culture, Linguistic Policy and Tourism of the Principality of Asturias).

== Education ==
She studied at the Instituto de Cangas de Onís, where she returned as a teacher years later. At the age of 17, she began her studies at the University of Oviedo, where she graduated in Filología hispánica.

== Career ==
During her time at the Faculty of Letters, she came into contact with other young writers such as Xuan Bello and Antón García with whom she founded, in 1986, the literary magazine Adréi, which she co-directed until 1992. These were years in which she frequented the literary gathering "Oliver" in Oviedo of José Luis García Martín and also began to publish in the magazine of the Academy of the Asturian Language, Lletres Asturianes y Suplementos del Norte.

In 1985, she won the Poetry Prize of the Academy of the Asturian Language withherhis work Al abellu les besties, which was published in 1986. His poetic work also includes Vida privada with which she won the Asturian poetry prize, Premio de Poesía Teodoro Cuesta (1991). This was followed by the publication of Temporada de pesca (Trabe, 1998), Un mes (Trabe, 2003), and Noches de incendio (1985-2002) (Trea, 2005), with a bilingual selection of her poems. In 2008, the Valencian publishing house Denes presented the anthology in Catalan Un mes i altres poemes (translated by Jaume Subirana i Ortín). In 2010. Piñán published her collection of poems La mancadura / El daño (2010). She has translated into Asturian works by John Christopher (Les montañes blanques) and Giusseppe Ungaretti (Ventidós poemes), and has written several essays such as Notes de sociollingüística asturiana (Llibros del Pexe, 1991) or Alfaya (1989).

Committed to feminism, Piñán published in 2003 Tres sieglos construyendo la igualdá, ¿Qué ye'l feminismu? (Ámbitu) in which she gives the history of feminism for an adolescent audience, with illustrations by Pablo Amargo (National Illustration Award), a book dedicated to her adopted daughter.

In 2004, at the 2004 Princess of Asturias Awards closing ceremony, the then Prince Felipe, read some verses from the poem "Una casa" from Piñán's book Un mes (2003) to highlight the work carried out for 20 years by the organization's Foundation and to underline the role that in the future, his wife, Letizia Ortiz, would play "in the care of that tree".—

"Llevantar una casa que seya como/ un árbol, como Dafne crecer peles/ sos rames, sentir les estaciones, la fueya/ nuevo después de la ivernera, les frutes primeres/ del veranu. Una casa que seya como un árbol/ qu'aguante los rellampos, qu'escample/ la pedrisca, qu'espante lloñe la ventolera xélido/ del tiempu."
(To bring a house that is like a tree, like Daphne/ a tree, like Daphne to grow along/ her branches, to feel the seasons, the fire/ new after the winter, the first fruits/ of summer. A house that is like a tree/ that withstands the downpours, that scales/ the hail, that scares away the rain from the icy wind/ of the weather.)

From 2005 to 2011, Piñán was a member of the jury of the Prince of Asturias Award for Letters.

In 2005, Piñán published La maleta al agua, a collection of short stories and two poems whose thematic nexus is the reality of emigration. Her narrative work also includes children's literature, Lula, Lulina en Trabe (1996) his first work, or Arroz, agua y maíz Pintar-Pintar (2009) a social poetry book for children in which she tells in 20 poems 20 stories of children from different countries, winner of the "María Josefa Canellada Award" for Children's and Young People's Literature in Asturian in 2008. In 2008 and 2009, she received the "Asturias Critics' Prize" awarded by the Asturias Writers' Association, in the category of Children's and Young People's Literature in Asturian with Les coses que-y prestten a Fran (2008) and L'estranxeru (2009) and in 2012, the "Critics' Prize of Asturian Letters" with La mio hermana ye una mofeta.

Involved in the movement for the official status of the Asturian language, in November 2007, Piñán took part in a march called by the Conceyu Abiertu pola Oficialidá and, together with the singer, Hevia, she read the communiqué at the end of the demonstration.

On May 9, 2008, she became a full member of the Academia de la Llingua Asturiana.

Piñán and Bello are considered the main representatives in the field of poetry of the second generation of Surdimientu, a movement that tries to recover and dignify Asturian as a language of culture. Their work is linked to the poetic Asturian literary tradition. Her work has been included in several anthologies, the Antoloxía poética del Surdimientu (1989) by Xosé Bolado, Nórdica, ultima poesía en asturiano (1994) by José Ángel Cilleruelo, Las muyeres y los díes de la poesía contemporánea asturiana (1995) by Leopoldo Sánchez Torre and the Antoloxía de muyeres poetes asturianes s.XX by Helena Trejo (2004).

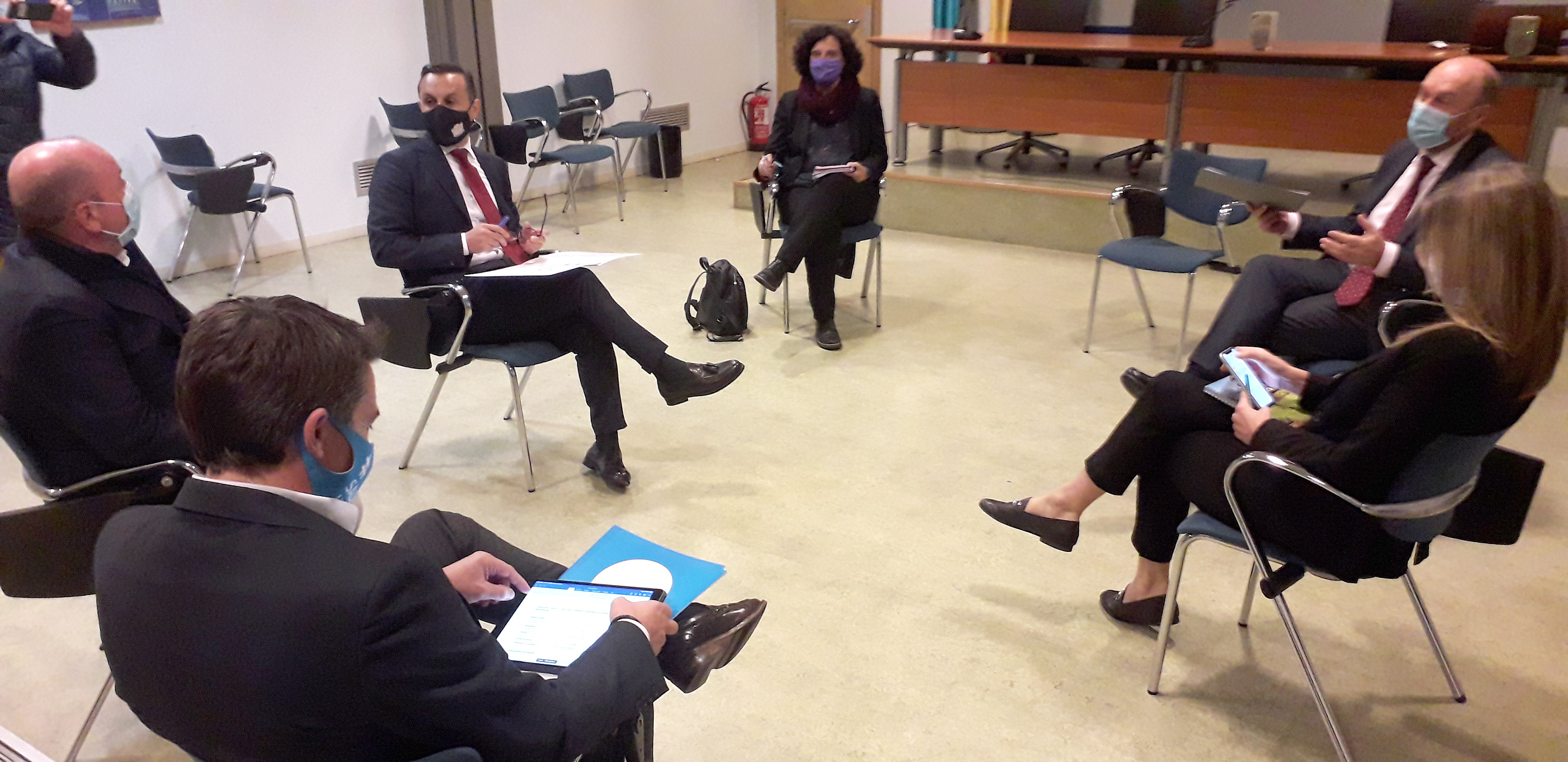
The vice-president of the Principality of Asturias, Juan Cofiño, and the Minister of Culture, Language Policy and Tourism, Berta Piñán meet with the hotel and catering industry. (2020)

Since July 25, 2019, Piñán has served as Minister of Culture, Linguistic Policy and Tourism of the Principality of Asturias in the government of the Asturian socialist Adrián Barbón.

== Awards and honours ==
- 1985 Academy of the Asturian Language Poetry Award for Al abellu les besties
- 1991 Teodoro Cuesta Poetry Award for Vida Privada
- 1995 Trabe Narrative Prize for La tierra entero
- 2008 María Josefa Canellada Award for Children's and Young People's Literature for Agua, arroz y maíz
- 2008 and 2009 Critics' Prize of Asturias in the category of Children's and Young Adult Literature in Asturian for Les coses que-y presten a Fran (2008) and L'estranxeru (2009)
- 2009 Diploma in the Visual AWarads for Editorial Design for Agua, arroz y maíz
- 2012 Asturian Letters Critic Award from the Junta por la Defensa de la Lengua for La mio hermana ye una mofeta

== Selected works ==
=== Poetry ===
- 1986 Al abellu les besties (Academia de la Llingua Asturiana)
- 1991 Vida privada
- 1998 Temporada de pesca (Ed. Trabe)
- 2002 Un mes (Ed. Trabe)
- 2005 Noches de incendio (1985-2002) (Ediciones Trea).
- 2008 Un mes i altres poemes (Denes. Edicions de la Guerra)
- 2010 La mancadura / El daño (Ediciones Trea)

=== Prose ===
- 1995 Muyeres que cuenten, anthology of fiction written by women with María Teresa González, Carme Martínez, Esther Prieto, Lourdes Álvarez, Consuelo Vega, Berta Piñán and Maite G. Iglesias (Ed. Trabe)
- 1996 La tierra entero
- 2003 Antoloxía del cuentu triste with Xuan Bello and Roberto González-Quevedo (Publicaciones Ambitu)
- 2005 La maleta al agua (Ed. Publicaciones Ámbitu)
- 2007 En casa ayena (Ed. Ateneo Obrero de Gijón)
- 2008 Textos literarios y contextos escolares with Agustín Fernández Paz, Juan Mata, Guadalupe Jover, Gustavo Bombini, Víctor Moreno, Manuel Rivas, Gonzalo Moure (Atxa. Ed. Grao)

=== Children and young adults ===
- 1996 Luna lunila (illustrations by Carmen Peña)
- 2005 El branu de Mirtya (Ed.Publicaciones Ámbitu )
- 2007 Las cosas que le gustan a Fran (Hotel Papel Ediciones)
- 2007 El extranjero (Hotel Papel Ediciones)
- 2009 Agua, arroz y maíz (illustrations by Elena Fernández) (Editorial Pintar)
- 2011 Mi hermana es una mofeta (illustrations by Francesca Assirelli) (Ed. Pintar)

=== Non-fiction ===
- 1991 Notes de Sociollingüistica Asturiana (Ed. Llibros del Pexes)
- 1989 Alfaya with Xuan Bello (Material Didáctico)
- 2003 Tres sieglos construyendo la igualdá

== See also ==
- Government of Adrián Barbón
