= Dolores Álvarez Campillo =

Spanish psychologist and politician (1960–2022)

Member of the General Junta of the Principality of Asturias
- In office 16 June 2015 – 24 June 2019
- Succeeded by: Enrique Riestra Rozas

Mayor of Llanes
- In office 30 April 2004 – 13 June 2015
- Preceded by: Antonio Trevín

Personal details
- Born: María Dolores Álvarez Campillo; 10 April 1960 Meré, Spain
- Died: 6 April 2022 (aged 61) Llanes, Spain
- Party: PSOE
- Education: University of Oviedo
- Occupation: Psychologist

María Dolores Álvarez Campillo (10 April 1960 – 6 April 2022) was a Spanish politician. A member of the Spanish Socialist Workers' Party, she served in the General Junta of the Principality of Asturias from 2015 to 2019. She died of cancer in Llanes on 6 April 2022 at the age of 61.
