= Isidro Martínez Oblanca =

Spanish politician (born 1956)

Isidro Manuel Martínez Oblanca
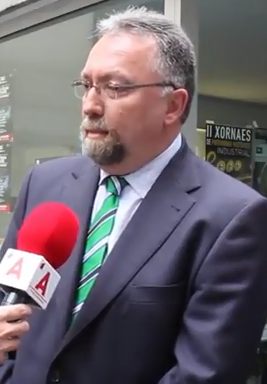

Member of the Congress of Deputies for Asturias
- In office 3 December 2019 – 30 May 2023

Senator in the Congress of Deputies for Asturias
- In office 20 July 2011 – 24 September 2015

Member of the General Junta of the Principality of Asturias
- In office 15 October 2015 – 4 February 2016

Personal details
- Born: 12 November 1956 (age 69) Orihuela, Spain
- Party: People's Party (until 2011); Asturias Forum (2011-2023)
- Occupation: Politician

Isidro Manuel Martínez Oblanca (Gijón, 12 November 1956) is a Spanish nurse and politician.

== Biography ==
A graduate in nursing from the University of Oviedo in 1983, he has worked at the Red Cross Hospital as well as at the Asepeyo accident insurance company in Gijón.

He is a co-founder of Asturias Forum. He has been a councillor in the City Council of Gijón for three terms (1983–1987, 1991–1995 and 1995–1999), deputy of the General Junta of the Principality of Asturias between 1987 and 1991, elected senator in the period 1996–2004 and senator by regional appointment (General Junta of the Principality of Asturias) in 2011–2015. In December 2015 he was elected deputy for Asturias in Congress and re-elected in 2016 and November 2019.

In May 2023, after the call for elections and the end of his term as deputy following the dissolution of the Cortes, Oblanca withdrew from Asturias Forum as he considered that the party had abandoned the principles on which it was created.
