= José Ángel Fernández Villa =

Spanish trade unionist (born 1943)

José Ángel Fernández Villa (Tuilla, Langreo, Asturias January 1943) is a Spanish trade unionist and politician, known for having been secretary general of the union Union of Mineworkers of Asturias for 34 years.

== Biography ==
Villa learned how to relate with people in his father's pub Casa Hernández frequented by numerous miners and trade unionists. At the age of fourteen he joined a construction company and at sixteen entered the Santa Eulalia mining pit, joining the General Union of Workers and the Spanish Socialist Workers' Party.

During the 1960s and 1970s he worked for many companies such as Duro Felguera or Ensidesa but he was fired from all of them. According to writer José Ramón Gómez Fouz in his book Clandestinos, Villa was recruited as a collaborator of the secret Francoist police around 1973, when he started to work in the mine La Colladona. In 1976 he creates the union SOMA-UGT (Sindicato de los Obreros Mineros de Asturias) (Union of Mineworkers of Asturias). In 1979 he was appointed general secretary of SOMA-UGT, a position he held until 2013.

=== Occupation of Pozo Barredo ===
On December 23, 1991, thirty-six trade unionists, led by Villa and Antonio González Hevia, general secretary of CCOO of mining, locked themselves inside emblematic mining Pozo Barredo in protest of minery company Hunosa industrial plans. It ended on January 3, 1992, and it is considered the end of an age in the conception of minery in Asturias.

== Corruption ==
In October 2014 he is investigated by the Prosecutor's Office on suspicion of having hidden from Hacienda 1.4 million euros, as such he was expelled from SOMA and UGT. Villa would have accumulated this money during his 35 years as leader of the union by diverting funds for the formation of unemployed miners, collecting diets of fraudulent forms, nepotistic practices or mixing Asturian coal with other of lower quality to obtain a greater benefit for it.
