= Cristina Coto =

Spanish politician (born 1970)

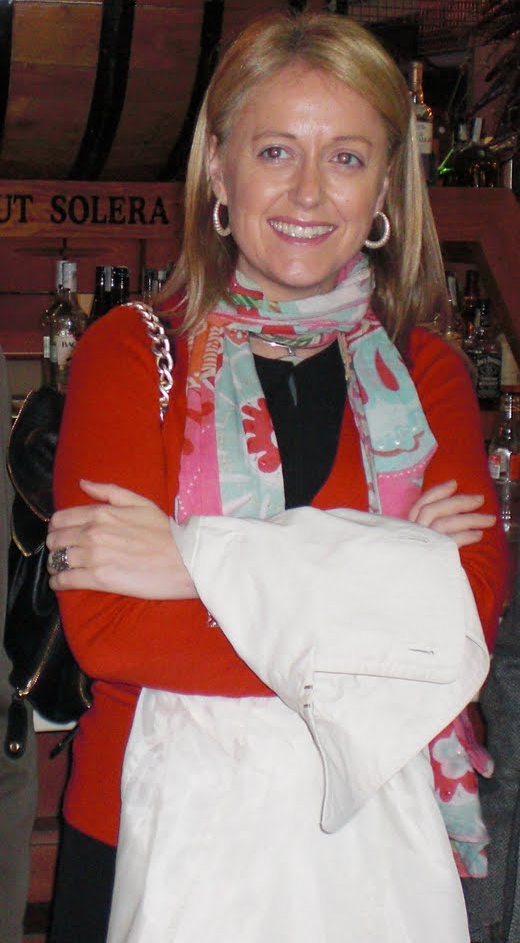
- Coto in 2015

President of Asturias Forum
- In office 14 March 2015 – 15 June 2018
- Preceded by: Francisco Álvarez-Cascos
- Succeeded by: Carmen Moriyón

Member of the General Junta of the Principality of Asturias
- In office 2003–2011
- In office 2012–2018

Member of Oviedo City Council
- In office 2011–2019

Personal details
- Born: 6 March 1970 (age 56) Sotrondio, Asturias, Spain
- Party: People's Party (fl. 1994–2011); Asturias Forum (2011–after 2018); Vox (fl. 2019–present)
- Spouse: José Bernardo Pino (m. 2016)
- Education: University of Oviedo; University of Barcelona

Cristina Coto de la Mata (born 6 March 1970) is a Spanish politician who was president of the Asturias Forum (2015–2018) and was a deputy in the General Junta of the Principality of Asturias (2003–2011; 2012–2018) and in the Oviedo City Council (2011–2019). Prior to being elected to office, she was a lawyer and a People's Party regional official.

== Biography ==
Cristina Coto de la Mata was born on 6 March 1970 in Sotrondio, a small town in Asturias. Her father Jesus Coto (1939/1940 – 15 November 2021) was a bank manager who worked for Banco Popular Español. She was educated at the University of Oviedo (where she studied law) and the University of Barcelona (where she got a Master's Degree in Organizational Communication Management). She practiced law from 1998 until 2003.

In 1994, Coto joined the New Generations of the People's Party, the youth wing of the People's Party (PP). In 1999, she became the party's secretary of municipal organization. In 2002, she was appointed as the PP's organization coordinator for Asturias. She was elected deputy of the party's parliamentary group in the General Junta of the Principality of Asturias after the 2003 Asturian regional election. She was re-elected to the parliamentary group after the 2007 election.

On 3 February 2011, Coto resigned from the General Junta; she also left the PP to join the Asturias Forum, a recently created regional party founded by former PP secretary-general (and later President of the Principality of Asturias) Francisco Álvarez-Cascos. The party later gained control of the Asturias government after the 2011 Asturian regional election, and Coto returned to the General Junta as a member of the Forum; she was also one of the two secretaries of the 8th General Junta of the Principality of Asturias. Coto was appointed as the party's parliamentary spokesperson in November 2011. She was later re-elected to Asturias Forum's parliamentary group in the 2012 and 2015 Asturian regional elections.

In February 2015, Álvarez-Cascos resigned as president of Asturias Forum. Coto was elected as the party's new president in a congress held on 14 March 2015. On 15 June 2018, she resigned as president of the Forum, due to differences with the leadership, and as leader of the Forum's General Junta parliamentary group. She resigned from the General Junta on 27 June.

In January 2019, Coto was announced as the Vox candidate for mayor of Oviedo in the 2019 Spanish local elections. She was one of the two councillors elected to Oviedo City Council. In the 2023 Spanish local elections, she was not re-appointed as a Vox candidate for mayor or as a candidate on the council's electoral lists.

Coto was a contributor to the Asturian-language newspaper Les Noticies.

== Personal life ==
In 2007, she filed a complaint against harassment against Luis Madiedo, a party official for the PP's Gijón division. Madiedo was expelled from the party, and he was ordered by a local court to pay Coto 20 euros every day for 20 days and to comply with a restraining order towards Coto.

On 8 October 2016, she married former rally driver José Bernardo Pino.
