= Pelayo Roces =

Spanish politician (1960–2025)

Member of the General Junta of the Principality of Asturias
- In office 15 June 2012 – 16 June 2015
- In office 1995–2011

Personal details
- Born: Pelayo Roces Arbesú; 27 September 1960 La Felguera, Spain
- Died: 9 November 2025 (aged 65) Oviedo, Spain
- Political party: PP (1995–2011); Foro (2011–2025)
- Occupation: Businessman

Pelayo Roces Arbesú (27 September 1960 – 9 November 2025) was a Spanish politician. A member of the People's Party and the Asturias Forum, he served in the General Junta of the Principality of Asturias from 1995 to 2011 and again from 2012 to 2015.

Roces died of cancer in Oviedo, on 9 November 2025, at the age of 65.
