= Vicente Álvarez Areces =

Spanish politician (1943–2019)

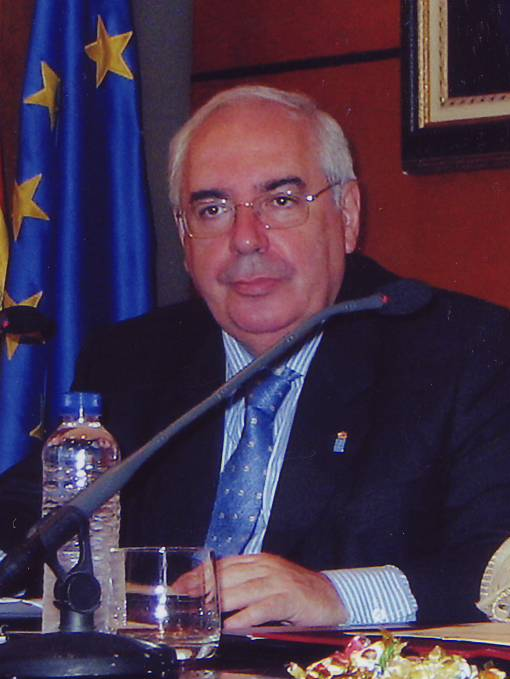

6th President of the Principality of Asturias
- In office 20 July 1999 – 15 July 2011
- Monarch: Juan Carlos I
- Preceded by: Sergio Marqués Fernández
- Succeeded by: Francisco Álvarez Cascos

Senator from Asturias
- In office 13 December 2011 – 17 January 2019

Mayor of Gijón
- In office 30 June 1987 – 3 July 1999

Personal details
- Born: 4 August 1943 Gijón, Asturias, Spain
- Died: 17 January 2019 (aged 75) Gijón, Asturias, Spain
- Party: PSOE

Vicente Alberto Álvarez Areces (4 August 1943 – 17 January 2019), also known as Tini Areces, was a Spanish politician. He served as the sixth President of the Principality of Asturias in Spain, and he was a member of the Spanish Socialist Workers' Party political party. He was also a member of the Committee of the Regions, working as a vice-president of the Party of European Socialists Group.

Areces was born in Gijón, and prior to his becoming President of Asturias in 1999, he had served as mayor of Gijón between 1987 and 1999. He died on 17 January 2019.

Preceded by José Manuel Palacio	Mayor of Gijón; 1987–1999	Succeeded by Paz Fernández Felgueroso
Preceded by Sergio Marqués Fernández	President of the Principality of Asturias; 1999–2011	Succeeded by Francisco Álvarez Cascos
