= Francisco Álvarez-Cascos =

Spanish politician (born 1947)

The Most Excellent Francisco Álvarez-Cascos
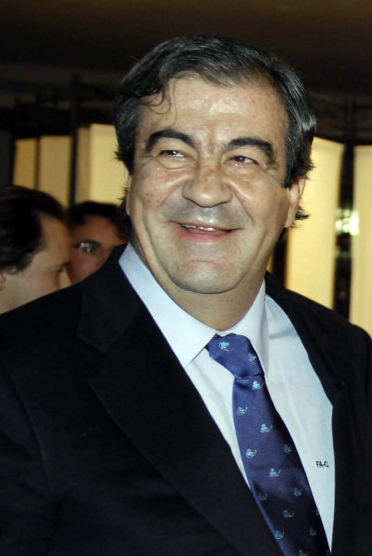

Deputy Prime Minister of Spain
- In office 6 May 1996 – 27 April 2000
- Prime Minister: José María Aznar
- Preceded by: Narcís Serra
- Succeeded by: Mariano Rajoy

7th President of the Principality of Asturias
- In office 15 July 2011 – 26 May 2012
- Monarch: Juan Carlos I
- Preceded by: Vicente Álvarez Areces
- Succeeded by: Javier Fernández Fernández

Personal details
- Born: 1 October 1947 (age 78) Madrid, Spain
- Party: Foro Asturias (FAC) (2011–present)
- Other political affiliations: PP (1976–2009)

Francisco Álvarez–Cascos Fernández (born 1 October 1947) is a Spanish politician. He was Secretary-General of the ruling Partido Popular from 1989 to 1999 and the President of the Principality of Asturias from 2011 to 2012.

Álvarez-Cascos studied civil engineering, and after working in an architect office and then for an architects association for a few years, he soon became a professional politician. In 1976 he joined Reforma Democrática, which later merged into Alianza Popular, both right-wing parties. He was the spokesman for the Gijón Council between 1979 and 1986, a county councilor and a member of the regional Pre-Autonomous Body.

In 1982, after Alianza Popular merged into the center-right People's Party, he was elected senator for Asturias, a position which he combined with that of spokesman for the People's Party Parliamentary Group in the General Junta of the Principate of Asturias (Asturias' regional legislature) from 1983 onwards. In 1986 he was elected deputy for Asturias and was re-elected in 1989, 1993, 1996 and 2000.

At the 9th National Congress of the People's Party, he was elected Secretary-General. He was confirmed three times in this office at the national congresses of the PP which took place in Seville (1990) and Madrid (1993 and 1996).

Álvarez-Cascos was First Deputy Prime Minister and Minister of the Presidency for the 1996-2000 term, and Minister for Development for the 2000-2004 term.

In 2004, he resigned from Congress and left politics for a few years.

== President of Asturias ==
In 2009, a sector of the party began to ask him to become PP's candidate for President of Asturias, organizing meetings and a campaign for his nomination. The regional party leadership led by Gabino de Lorenzo rejected him as a candidate and insulted him since he wanted to fire many of the people in charge in the party for decades losing election after election. The national leader Mariano Rajoy declined to support him against the attacks within his party, so he resigned from the party. In May 2011 he managed in just five months to create a new party Asturian Forum, which obtained a plurality of 16 out of the 45 seats in the Asturian autonomous parliament. He was inaugurated as President of Asturias.

After six months of minority government and the PP and PSOE (which together had an absolute majority of seats) declining every bill, his regional budget for 2012 was rejected. This blocked situation forced him to resign on 30 January 2012 and call for new elections to be held on 25 March. Asturian Forum lost 4 seats, ending up second behind the Socialist Party.

== Bárcenas affair ==
As part of the Bárcenas affair, it was revealed that Francisco Álvarez Cascos had received 421,693 euros from the People's Party from 1990 to 2004.

Political offices
Preceded by Narcís Serra	First Deputy Prime Minister of Spain; 1996–2000	Succeeded by Mariano Rajoy
Preceded by Alfredo Pérez Rubalcaba	Minister of the Presidency; 1996–2000	Succeeded by Mariano Rajoy
Preceded by Josep Borrell	Minister of Public Works; 2000–2004	Succeeded by Magdalena Álvarez
Preceded by Vicente Álvarez Areces	President of Asturias; 2011–2012	Succeeded by Javier Fernández
Party political offices
Preceded by Arturo García-Tizón	Secretary-General of the People's Party; 1989–1999	Succeeded by Javier Arenas
Preceded by Party founder	President of Asturias Forum; 2011–2015	Succeeded by Cristina Coto de la Mata
