= Asturias Forum =

Asturias Forum Foru Asturies
- President: Carmen Moriyón
- Secretary-General: Adrián Pumares
- Founder: Francisco Álvarez-Cascos
- Founded: 19 January 2011
- Split from: People's Party
- Newspaper: El Hormiguero
- Youth wing: Foro Joven (Young Forum)
- Membership (2011): 6,987
- Ideology: Autonomism; Regionalism; Liberalism; Pro-Europeanism
- Political position: Centre to centre-right
- Colors: Blue; Dark blue (formerly)
- Congress of Deputies: 0 / 7 (Asturian seats)
- Spanish Senate: 0 / 6 (Asturian seats)
- General Junta: 1 / 45
- Mayors: 3 / 78
- Local Government: 49 / 928

Website
- www.foroasturias.es

Asturias Forum (Spanish: Foro Asturias, Asturian: Foru Asturies, Foro), previously known as Forum of Citizens (Spanish: Foro de Ciudadanos, FAC) is a regionalist political party in the Principality of Asturias.

== History ==
Asturias Forum was founded in January 2011 by former Deputy Prime Minister Francisco Álvarez Cascos, who left the People's Party (PP) after failing to be selected as the party's candidate for President of the Principality of Asturias in the 2011 election.

In the Asturian election, Álvarez Cascos led the party under the name "Forum of Citizens" (Spanish: Foro de Ciudadanos). FAC won sixteen seats, making it the largest party on the General Council. Together with the PP, FAC's gains gave the centre-right a majority in Asturias for the first time. The party has spoken to all three other parties to create a more consensual political climate.

At the November 2011 Spanish election, the party won one of Asturias's eight seats in the Congress of Deputies.

After months of deadlock in the Asturian regional assembly, fresh elections were held. During these elections, FAC lost four seats; it became the second largest party behind the Spanish Socialist Workers' Party (PSOE).

On 12 February 2015, Francisco Álvarez-Cascos surprisingly announced he would not stand again as Asturias Forum's candidate and resigned the presidency of the party. Álvarez-Cascos was succeeded by Cristina Coto, while he went on to become the party's secretary-general.

After the resignation of Cristina Coto due to differences with Álvarez Cascos, Carmen Moriyón, mayor of Gijón, was elected new president of the party on 29 September 2018.

== Presidents ==
- Francisco Álvarez-Cascos 2011–2015
- Cristina Coto 2015–2018
- Carmen Moriyón 2018–present

== Electoral performance ==
=== General Junta of the Principality of Asturias ===
General Junta of the Principality of Asturias
Election	Leading candidate	Votes	%	Seats	+/–	Government
2011	Francisco Álvarez-Cascos	178,031	29.66 (#1)	16 / 45	16	Minority
2012	Francisco Álvarez-Cascos	124,518	24.80 (#2)	12 / 45	4	Opposition
2015	Cristina Coto	44,480	8.19 (#5)	3 / 45	9	Opposition
2019	Carmen Moriyón	34,687	6.52 (#6)	2 / 45	1	Opposition
2023	Adrián Pumares	19,652	3.66 (#6)	1 / 45	1	Opposition

=== Cortes Generales ===
==== Asturias ====
Congress of Deputies
Date	Votes			Seats		Status	Size	Notes
Date	#	%	±pp	#	±	Status	Size	Notes
2011	92,828	14.7%	—	1 / 8	—	Opposition	3rd	
2015	187,568	30.1%	N/A	1 / 8	0	Opposition	*	government support
2016	209,632	35.3%	N/A	1 / 8	0	Opposition	*	government support
Apr 2019	111,341	17.9%	N/A	0 / 7	1	Opposition	*	
Nov 2019	128,698	23.2%	N/A	1 / 7	1	Opposition	*	

Senate
Date	Seats		Size
Date	#	±	Size
2011	0 / 4	—	3rd
2015	1 / 4	1	*
2016	1 / 4	0	*
Apr 2019	0 / 4	1	*
Nov 2019	0 / 4	0	*

- * Within People's Party–Asturias Forum.

=== European Parliament ===
Spain
Date	Votes			Seats		Size
Date	#	%	±pp	#	±	Size
2014	32,962	0.2%	—	0 / 54	—	18th
2019	6,053	0.1%	–0.1	0 / 54	—	22nd

Asturias
Date	Votes			Size
Date	#	%	±pp	Size
2014	16,064	4.2%	—	6th
2019	6,053	1.2%	–3.0	6th
