= Covadonga (disambiguation) =

Covadonga is a parish of Cangas de Onís in Asturias, Spain.

Covadonga may also refer to:

== Places related to Covadonga, Spain ==
- Santa Cueva de Covadonga, cave and Catholic sanctuary that gave its name to the parish
- Basílica de Santa María la Real de Covadonga, Catholic basilica
- Lakes of Covadonga

== Other topics relating to Covadonga, Spain ==
- Battle of Covadonga (722 AD)
- Our Lady of Covadonga, shrine to Mary at the cave
  - Amigos de Covadonga, association dedicated to the shrine
- CD Covadonga, football club

== Other places ==
- Covadonga, a village in Aguada de Pasajeros, Cuba
- Covadonga Harbor, in Huon Bay (Antarctica)
- Base General Bernardo O'Higgins Riquelme, on Puerto Covadonga, Antarctica

== People ==
- Covadonga Romero Rodríguez (1917–2018), Spanish artist
- Covadonga Tomé (born 1970), Spanish politician
- Alfonso, Prince of Asturias (1907–1938), Count of Covadonga
  - Edelmira, Countess of Covadonga (1906–1994), his wife

== Other ==
- Spanish schooner Virgen de Covadonga, 19th-century Spanish naval ship
