= Federico Andahazi =

Argentine writer and psychologist (born 1963)

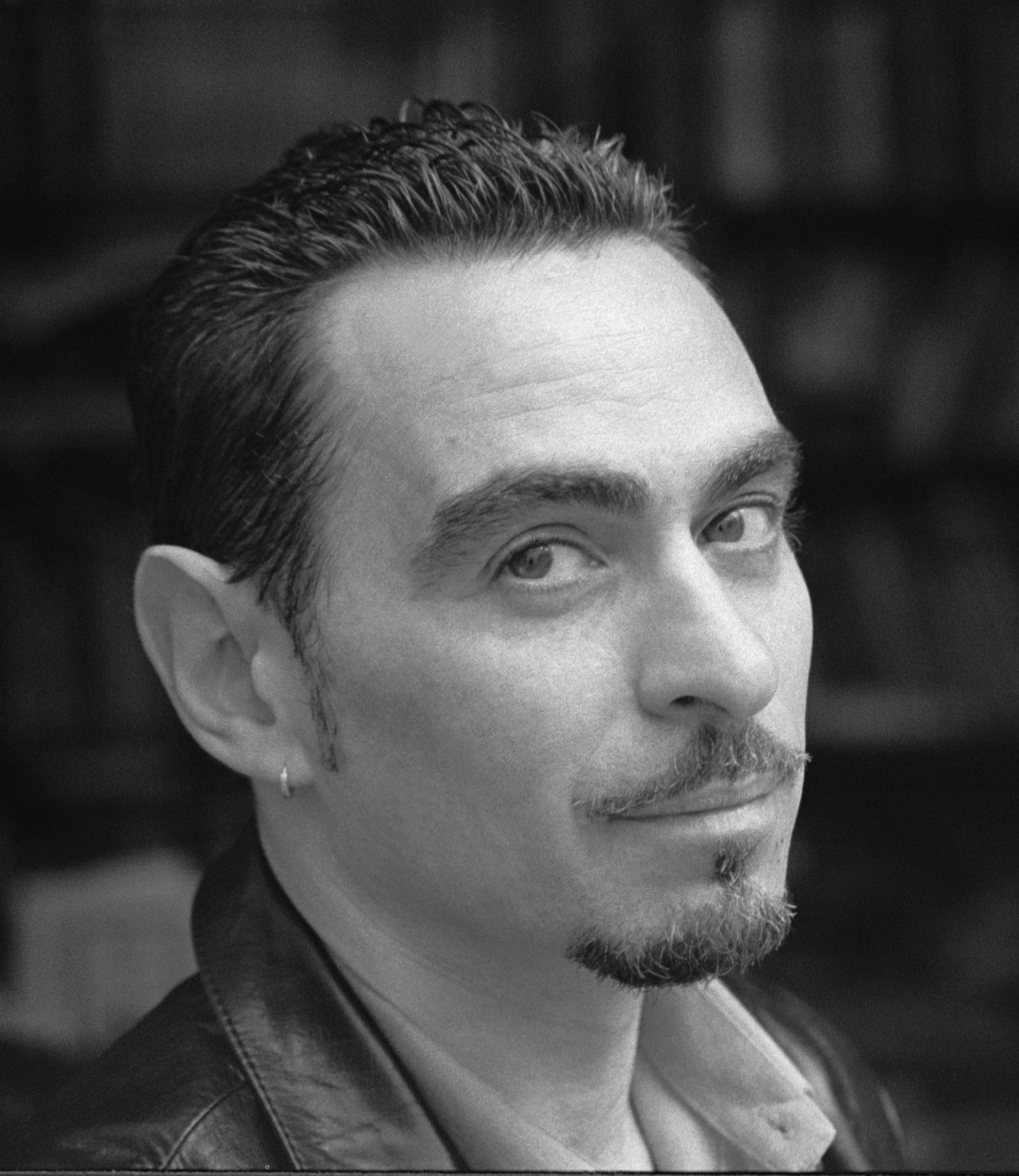
- Federico Andahazi in 2001. Photo: Aída Pippo.
- Born: Federico Andahazi; June 6, 1963 (age 63); Buenos Aires
- Education: University of Buenos Aires
- Occupation: writer
- Writing career
- Period: 1989–present
- Notable work: The Anatomist (1996)

Federico Andahazi (born June 6, 1963) is an Argentine writer and psychologist.

== Biography ==
Federico Andahazi was born in Buenos Aires, Argentina, at Congreso, a very central neighborhood of the city. He is the son of Bela Andahazi, an aristocratic Hungarian poet and psychoanalyst, and Juana Merlín, of Russian-Jewish ancestry. He obtained a bachelor's degree in Psychology (University of Buenos Aires); he practiced psychoanalysis a few years, while he was working on his short stories.

=== The Anatomist and Fortabat Awards affair ===
In 1996, while Andahazi was the finalist of the Planeta Awards, his novel The Anatomist won the First Prize of the Fundación Fortabat. However, the mentor and financial supporter of the contest, María Amalia Lacroze de Fortabat, announced her "disagreement" with the decision of the jury, through a request published in most newspapers of Buenos Aires, in which she stated that the novel "does not contribute to [the] exalt[ation of] the most high values of the human spirit".

The Fundación respected and implemented the decision of the jury, which included María Angélica Bosco, Raúl Castagnino, José María Castiñeira de Dios, María Granata and Eduardo Gudiño Kieffer, but the jury was subsequently dismissed by Amalia Lacroze de Fortabat and the literary competitions organized by the Fundación Fortabat have not been held again. In the end, she agreed to give Andahazi the $15,000 award that went with the prize but not the prize itself.

The Anatomist was published by Editorial Planeta in 1997, translated into over thirty languages, and has sold millions of copies worldwide.

=== Further works and activity ===
His second novel, Las piadosas (The Merciful Women), a Gothic fantasy set in Geneva, exploring the relationship between Lord Byron, his secretary Polidori and Mary Shelley, was published in 1998.

In 1998 the publishing house Temas published El árbol de las tentaciones, a small volume containing short stories that obtained awards. The three short stories begin in the same way and are located in similar settings of nineteenth-century Argentina.

In 2000 he published El príncipe and in 2002 El secreto de los flamencos.

Errante en la sombra was published in 2004; Andahazi wrote more than forty tangos for this story, in which singer Carlos Gardel takes part.

The novel La ciudad de los herejes was published in 2005.

Also during the summer of 2005, Andahazi and his readers collectively wrote a newspaper series called Mapas del fin del mundo (Maps from the End of the World) published by the newspaper Clarín. The author wrote the beginning of a text, asking the readers to continue the story, create characters, propose plots, solve riddles, to be sent by e-mail. Therefore, in an unprecedented work, reading and answering thousands of e-mails per week, Andahazi built the story with the various inputs and points of view. Every Saturday a new chapter was added to the novel, increasing the participation and the expectation of readers turned co-authors.

In 2006, Federico Andahazi was awarded the Planeta Prize for his novel El conquistador ("The Conqueror"). There he narrates the story of Quetza, the brilliant son of Tenochtitlan, who discovers the European continent.

In 2008, Andahazi published his first non-fiction book, Pecar como Dios manda, a sexual history of Argentines.

He took part in numerous anthologies, among others: Las palabras pueden: Los escritores y la infancia (2007), dedicated to UNICEF and World Food Programme, with authors like José Saramago, Carlos Fuentes, Ernesto Sábato, Juan Gelman, Mario Benedetti and Mario Vargas Llosa; Líneas aéreas (1999, published by Lengua de trapo, Spain) with writers such as Jorge Volpi, Santiago Gamboa and Edmundo Paz Soldán; A Whistler in the Nightworld, collection of short fiction from Latin America (2002, published by Plume, USA) with Laura Restrepo and Ángeles Mastretta among others; La Selección Argentina (2000, published by Tusquets); El libro de los nuevos pecados capitales (2001, Norma Publishing Group). He also took part in the book Homage to Diego Maradona (2001, SAF) together with Roberto Fontanarrosa and Pacho O'Donnell.

His books have been translated to many languages. In the United States, he has been published by Doubleday, in England by Transworld, in France by Laffont, in Italy by Frassinelli, in China by China Times, in Japan by Kadokawa, in Germany by Wolfgang Krüger.

He has delivered lectures in the Faculty of Journalism and Communication Sciences of the University of Moscow, Russia, and the University of Santos Ossa of Antofagasta, Chile. He has also given talks in Stockholm, London, Paris, Istanbul and other cities of Europe, Latin America, and The United States.

He has participated in literary congresses in France, Finland, and several cities in Spain among others. He has been invited to book fairs in Guadalajara, Moscow, Pula, Istanbul, Madrid, Barcelona, Buenos Aires and other cities of Argentina.

He has written articles published by Clarín, La Nación, Perfil, Noticias, Veintitrés, Lamujerdemivida, Brando, V de Vian, and others in Argentina, USA, Portugal, and Colombia.

== Personal life ==
Andahazi is married to the visual artist Aída Pippo since 1998; they have two children, Vera and Blas.

== Selected works ==
Novels

- 1997: El anatomista (The Anatomist). Translated by Alberto Manguel.
- 1998: Las piadosas (The Merciful Women). Translated by Alberto Manguel.
- 2000: El príncipe (The Prince)
- 2002: El secreto de los flamencos (The Secret of the Flemish)
- 2004: Errante en la sombra (Drifting in the Shadow)
- 2005: La ciudad de los herejes (City of Heretics)
- 2006: El conquistador (The Conqueror)
- 2012: El libro de los placeres prohibidos (The Book of Forbidden Pleasures)
- 2015: Los amantes bajo el Danubio (The Lovers under the Danube)
- 2019: La matriarca, el barón y la sierva (The Matriarch, the Baron, and the Servant)
- 2022: Las huellas del mal (The Traces of Evil)
- 2023: Psicódromo (Psychodrome)
- 2025: Mares de furia (Seas of Rage)

Stories

- 1998: El árbol de las tentaciones (Tree of Temptations)
- 2009: El oficio de los Santos (The Office of the Saints)

Non-fiction

- 2008: Pecar como Dios manda. Historia sexual de los argentinos (To Sin Like You Mean It: A Sexual History of the Argentine People)
- 2009: Argentina con pecado concebida. Historia sexual de los argentinos II (Argentina, Conceived with Sin: A Sexual History of the Argentine People II)
- 2010: Pecadores y pecadoras. Historia sexual de los argentinos III (Sinner Men and Women: A Sexual History of the Argentine People III)
- 2017: El equilibrista (The Tightrope Walker)

Anthologies and collaborations

- 1999: Líneas aéreas (Lengua de trapo, España)
- 2000: La selección argentina (Editorial Tusquets)
- 2001: Homenaje a Diego A. Maradona (2001, S.A.F.E.)
- A whistler in the nightworld, short fiction from the Latin Americas (Published by Plume, USA)
- 2007: Las palabras pueden: Los escritores y la infancia (UNICEF y Programa Mundial de Alimentos)
- From 2008 till 2009 he directed the research about the sexual history of Mexico, Colombia and Chile, in collaboration with the writers Eugenio Aguirre, Roberto Palacio and Jaime Collyer. All the books bearing the original title of the first volume of the Argentine sexual history: Pecar como Dios manda.

== Literary awards ==
- In 1996 he won the First Prize of the Segunda Bienal de Arte Joven de la Ciudad de Buenos Aires with his short story Almas misericordiosas. The same year he received the First Prize of the Concurso Anual desde la Gente with his short story El sueño de los justos.
- Towards the end of 1996, he was awarded the CAMED Prize for the short story Por Encargo.
- In 1996 he won the First Prize of the Fortabat Foundation for The Anatomist.
- In 2006 he was awarded the Planeta Prize for El Conquistador.
