= Covadonga Romero Rodríguez =

Spanish sculptor and painter (1917–2018)

- Born: 8 September 1917; Boo, Spain
- Died: 27 June 2018 (aged 100); Oviedo, Spain
- Occupation(s): Sculptor, painter
- Notable work: Busto del Padre Vinjoy
- Spouse: Ruperto Álvarez Caravia
- Awards: Medal of Asturias (2004)

Covadonga Romero Rodríguez (8 September 1917 – 27 June 2018) was a Spanish sculptor and painter, a pioneer of the women's avant-garde of Asturias.

== Biography ==
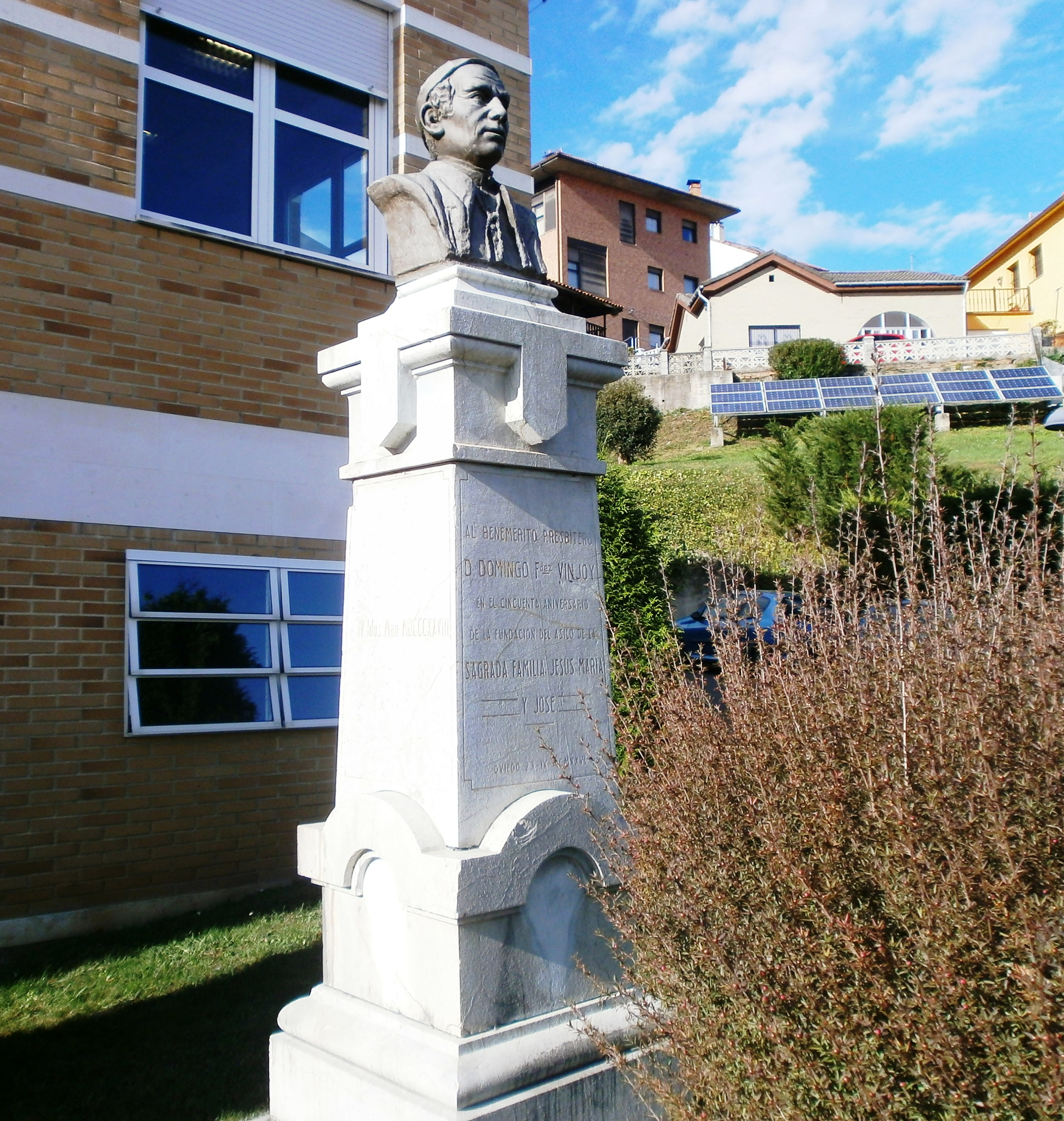
Busto del Padre Vinjoy

Covadonga Romero Rodríguez was born in the parish of Boo, Aller, Spain on 8 September 1917. She began her artistic studies at the School of Applied Arts in Oviedo, where she had Víctor Hevia Granda and Mariano Monedero del Río as teachers, among others.

She lived in the house of her great-uncle Payarinos, dean of Oviedo Cathedral. Later the house became the headquarters of the Conservatory. She had three children: Ruperto (one of the discoverers of Tito Bustillo Cave), Santiago, and Elena (a restorer).

Her earliest work was done with modeling clay. She studied Artistic Drawing, Modeling and Molding, Artistic Stained Glass, and Ceramics at the School of Applied Arts and Artistic Trades of Oviedo, and won the Macián Award during her 1946 to 1949 courses.

The modeling and casting of her sculptures was done using the process she had learned with Víctor Hevia, although she dispensed with the preliminary sketch.

She exhibited for the first time in 1949, and subsequently participated in several solo and group exhibitions. These included ones with her husband Ruperto Álvarez Caravia in the Caja de Ahorros de Asturias and the Sala Nogal, both in Oviedo, in 1976 and 1983.

In 1958 she joined the group "Homenaje a Tamayo" with Jacinto Melcón, Jorge Valdés, and her husband Ruperto, with whom she exhibited in Oviedo, Gijón, and Avilés in 1964.

In addition to painting, she created sculptural works in bronze, marble, wood, cement, and plastic, including the urban sculpture known as Busto del Padre Vinjoy (Bust of Father Vinjoy), for the foundation that bears his name.

In 1990 the producer of RTVE in Asturias commissioned a portrait of Severo Ochoa and his wife, which is in the Museo Jovellanos in Gijón.

Romero's works include Retrato de mi hija, Joven turista, Muchacha triste, Rupertín, Busto de Asunción Álvarez Santander, Busto de José María Velasco, Busto de José García de la Noceda, and El Salvador.

On 7 September 2004, along with Blanca Meruéndano Cantalapiedra, Mercedes Gómez Morán, Maruja Moutas Merás, Pepa Osorio, Rosario Areces González, and Amparo Cores Uría, Covadonga Romero Rodríguez received the Silver Medal of Asturias, a prize that is awarded annually by the government of the principality, in recognition of difficult work done by the first generation of women plastic artists linked to the 20th-century Asturian avant-garde.

Covadonga Romero Rodríguez died in Oviedo on 27 June 2018.

== Awards and recognitions ==
- Macián Award (1946, 1947, 1948, 1949)
- Silver Medal of Asturias (2004)
