= Jean Meyer =

French-Mexican historian and author

Jean Meyer Barth
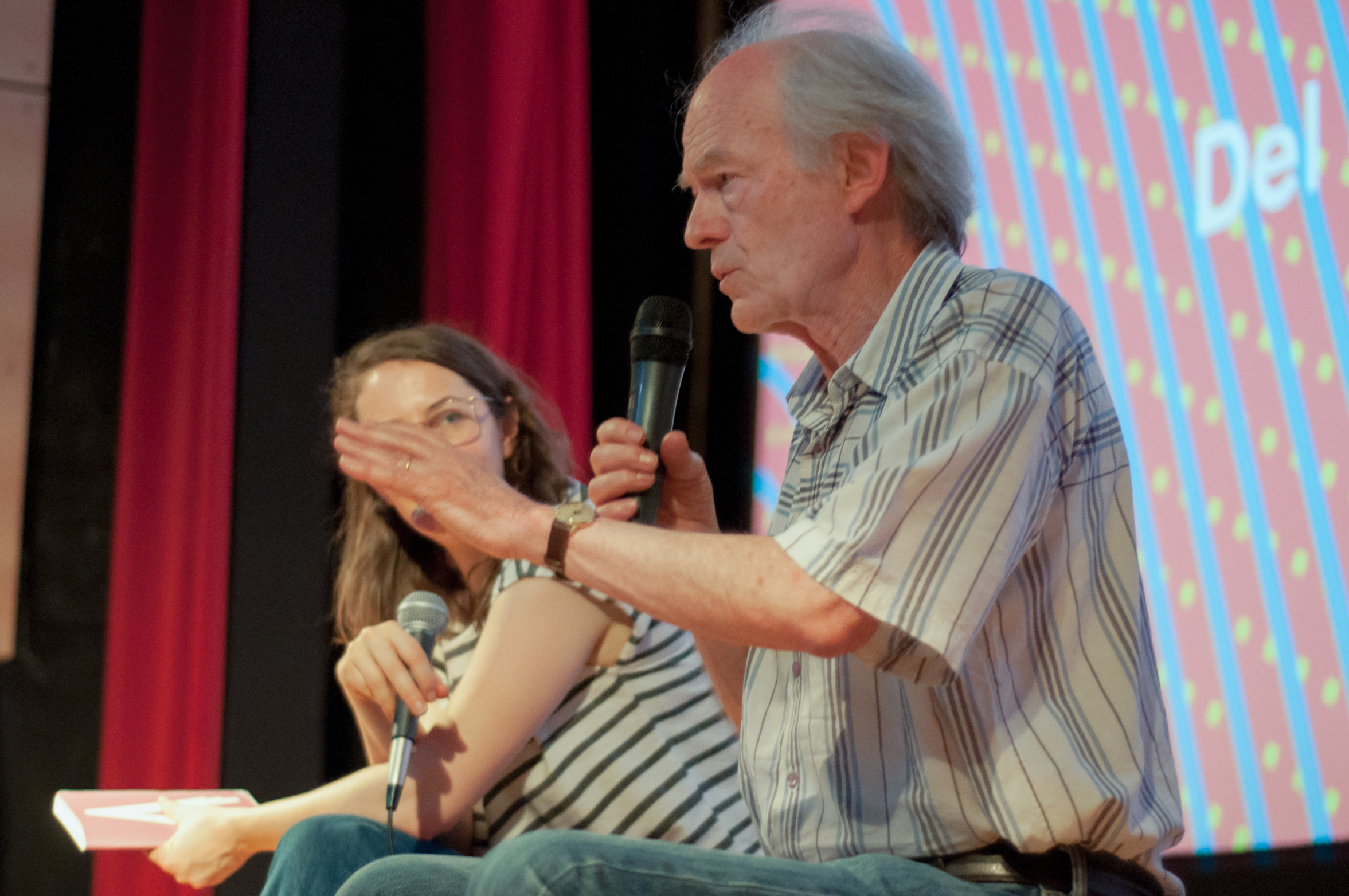
- Born: February 8, 1942 (age 84); Nice, France
- Relatives: Yves Meyer (French mathematician, cousin)
- Awards: Guggenheim Fellowship (1997–1998); National Prize for Arts and Sciences (2011); Member, Mexican Academy of History

Academic background
- Education: Sorbonne; Paris Nanterre University
- Thesis: 'Les Cristeros : contribution à l’histoire de la guerre des paysans mexicains, 1926–1929' (1971)

Academic work
- Discipline: History
- Sub-discipline: Mexican history Religious conflict Rural society
- Institutions: El Colegio de México; Colegio de Michoacán; CIDE; University of Perpignan
- Notable works: La Cristiada (3 vols); The Cristero Rebellion

Jean Meyer Barth (born February 8, 1942) is a French-Mexican historian and author, known for his writings on early 20th-century Mexican history. He has published extensively on the Mexican Revolution and Cristero War, the history of Nayarit, and on the caudillo Manuel Lozada. He is a faculty member at the Centro de Investigación y Docencia Económicas, and a Guggenheim Fellow.

== Biography ==
Jean Meyer was born in Nice. He obtained bachelor's and master's degrees at the Sorbonne University. He has taught at Sorbonne, Perpignan, the University of Paris, the Colegio de México, the Colegio de Michoacán, and the Centro de Investigación y Docencia Económicas. He has done extensive research on the Cristero War and written books on the subject for the University of Cambridge and the Universidad de Guadalajara. He also founded the Institute of Mexican Studies at the University of Perpignan in France.

His major publications deal with conservative peasants in nineteenth- and twentieth-century Mexico. His work on the Cristero War is crucial for the understanding of this major uprising in Mexico following the enforcement of the anticlerical articles of the 1917 Constitution of Mexico. He has also published important works about Manuel Lozada, a nineteenth-century regional leader in Nayarit who fought for the rights of mestizo and indigenous peasants. Historian Eric Van Young reviewed Meyer's Esperando a Lozada, saying "the major essays are beautifully written, talky, strongly rhetorical, slightly wistful in tone, and intensely romantic and hardheaded at one and the same time, as with much of the best French annaliste history." He has also written on Soviet and Russian history.

He is a recognized authority on the immediate post-revolutionary period in Mexico and was chosen to write the general article on Mexico in the 1920s for the Cambridge History of Latin America.

His cousin is the Abel Prize-winning mathematician Yves Meyer.

== Publications ==
- Meyer, Jean (2012). La fábula del crimen ritual. El antisemitismo europeo (1880 - 1914). Mexico: Tusquets. ISBN 9786074213546.
- Meyer, Jean (2010). Camino a Baján. Mexico: Tusquets. ISBN 9786074211399.
- Meyer, Jean (2009). El celibato sacerdotal. Su historia en la Iglesia católica. Mexico: Tusquets. ISBN 9786074210668.
- Meyer, Jean (2008). La cruzada por México. Los católicos de Estados Unidos y la cuestión religiosa en México. Mexico: Tusquets. ISBN 9789706991898.
- Meyer, Jean (2006). La Gran Controversia entre las Iglesias Católica y Ortodoxa. Mexico/Madrid: Tusquets.
- Meyer, Jean (2003). El Sinarquismo, el Cardenismo y la Iglesia: 1937–1947. Mexico: Tusquets. ISBN 9789706990693.
- Meyer, Jean (2002). Anacleto González Flores, el hombre que quiso ser el Gandhi mexicano. Madrid, Mexico: Fundación Emmanuel Mounier. ISBN 9789686839555.
- Meyer, Jean (2002). Yo, el Francés. Biografía colectiva de los oficiales de la intervención francesa. Mexico: Tusquets. ISBN 9786074210163.
- Meyer, Jean (2002). Tierra de Cristeros. Colotlán, Jalisco: Universidad de Guadalajara. ISBN 9789709022575.
- Meyer, Jean (2001). El coraje cristero: testimonios. Colotlán, Jalisco: Universidad de Guadalajara. ISBN 9789709022513.
- Mendoza Barragán, Ezequiel; Meyer, Jean (2001). Confesiones de un cristero. Mexico: Breve Fondo Editorial. OCLC 48855588.
- Meyer, Jean (2000). Samuel Ruiz en San Cristóbal (2 editions). Mexico: Tusquets. ISBN 9789706990006.
- Meyer, Jean (1997). "Manuel Lozada". Chicago: Fitzroy Dearborn. pp. 763–64. OCLC 312840218.
- Jáuregui, Jesús; Meyer, Jean (1997). El Tigre de Alica. Mitos e Historia de Manuel Lozada. ISBN 9789687997100.
- Meyer, Jean (1997). Breve Historia de Nayarit. Fondo de Cultura Económica. ISBN 9789681649937.
- Meyer, Jean (1997). Rusia y sus imperios 1894-1991. Fondo de Cultura Económica. ISBN 9788483830284.
- Meyer, Jean (1997). Grandeza mexicana. Mexico: Clío. ISBN 9789686932348.
- Meyer, Jean (1997). La vida cotidiana. Mexico: Clío. ISBN 9789686932331.
- Meyer, Jean (1997). La guerra. Mexico: Clío.
- El conflicto entre la Iglesia y el Estado. México, ed. Clío, 1997.
- Hidalgo, México, Clio, 1996.
- El campesino en la historia rusa y soviética. México, Fondo de Cultura Económica, 1996.
- Mascota en la gran década nacional 1857-1867. Guadalajara, CEMCA, Universidad de Guadalajara, 1994.
- Atonalisco, Nayarit, una historia documental 1695-1935. CEMCA-INI, 1994.
- Visita a las misiones del Nayarit. CEMCA-INI 1993.
- Con Thomas Calvo, Xalisco, la voz de un pueblo en el siglo XVI. CEMCA/CIESAS.
- Con Juan José Doñan, Antología del cuento cristero. Guadalajara, Secretaría de Cultura de Jalisco, 1993.
- Egohistorias. El amor a Clío. México, CEMCA, 1993 (editor)
- Los tambores de Calderón (1810-1811). México, Editorial Diana, 1993.
- La Cristiada en Colima. Colima, Instituto Cultural, 1993.
- Ramírez Flores, José. La Revolución maderista en Jalisco Universidad de Guadalajara, CEMCA, 1992.
- La Revolución Mexicana. México, ed. Jus. 1992.
- "Revolution and Reconstruction in the 1920s" in Mexico Since Independence, Leslie Bethell, ed. New York: Cambridge University Press 1991, pp. 201–240.
- El campesino en la historia rusa y soviética. México, Fondo de Cultura (1991).
- El partido católico nacional. por E. J. Correa, F.C.E. 1991.
- La perestroika, 1991, México, Fondo de Cultura Económica, 2 vols.
- Testimonio cristero. Memorias de don Ezequiel Mendoza. México, ed. Jus.
- Les chrétiens d'Amérique Latine XIXe et XXe S, 1991, París, Desclée.
- De cantón de Tepic a Estado de Nayarit, Colección de Documentos para la historia de Nayarit, CEMCA/Universidad de Guadalajara, 1990.
- La tierra de Manuel Lozada, Colección de Documentos para la historia de Nayarit, CEMCA/Universidad de Guadalajara, 1989.
- Nuevas Mutaciones, el siglo XVIII, Colección de Documentos para la historia de Nayarit, CEMCA/Universidad de Guadalajara, 1990.
- Historia de los cristianos en América Latina Siglos XIX y XX. México, Editorial Vuelta, 1989.
- A la voz del rey. México, Cal y Arena, 1989.
- El Gran Nayar. México 1989. CEMCA/Universidad de Guadalajara, 1989.
- La casa en el bosque: las "trojes" de Michoacán. México, El Colegio de Michoacán, 1987.
- La vitivinicultura en México. México, El Colegio de Michoacán, 1985.
- Zamora ayer, México 1985.
- Esperando a Lozada, México, Secretaría de Educación Pública, 1983.
- Champs du pouvoir, champs du savoir editor y coautor CNRS 1982.
- Coraje Cristero. México, Universidad Autónoma Metropolitana, 1981.
- El sinarquismo, ¿un fascismo mexicano? México, J. Mortiz, 1979.
- Intellectuels et Etat au Mexique au XXe siècle C.N.R.S. 1979.
- Historia de la Revolución mexicana 1924-1929, 2 volúmenes. México 1978, Colegio de México.
- Le Sinarquisme, un fascisme mexicain? Paris, Hachette 1977.
- The Cristero Rebellion. The Mexican people between Church and State. Cambridge University 1976.
- La Christiade; 1'Etat et le peuple dans la révolution mexicaine. Paris 1975, Payot.
- Apocalypse et Révolution au Mexique, Paris 1974 Gallimard archives.
- La Cristiada (3 vols.) México 1973-1975, 20 edición en 2000.
- Problemas agrarios y movimientos campesinos. México 1973.
- La révolution mexicaine. Paris, Calmann Lévy, 1973.
