= Lisardo Lombardía =

Spanish physician

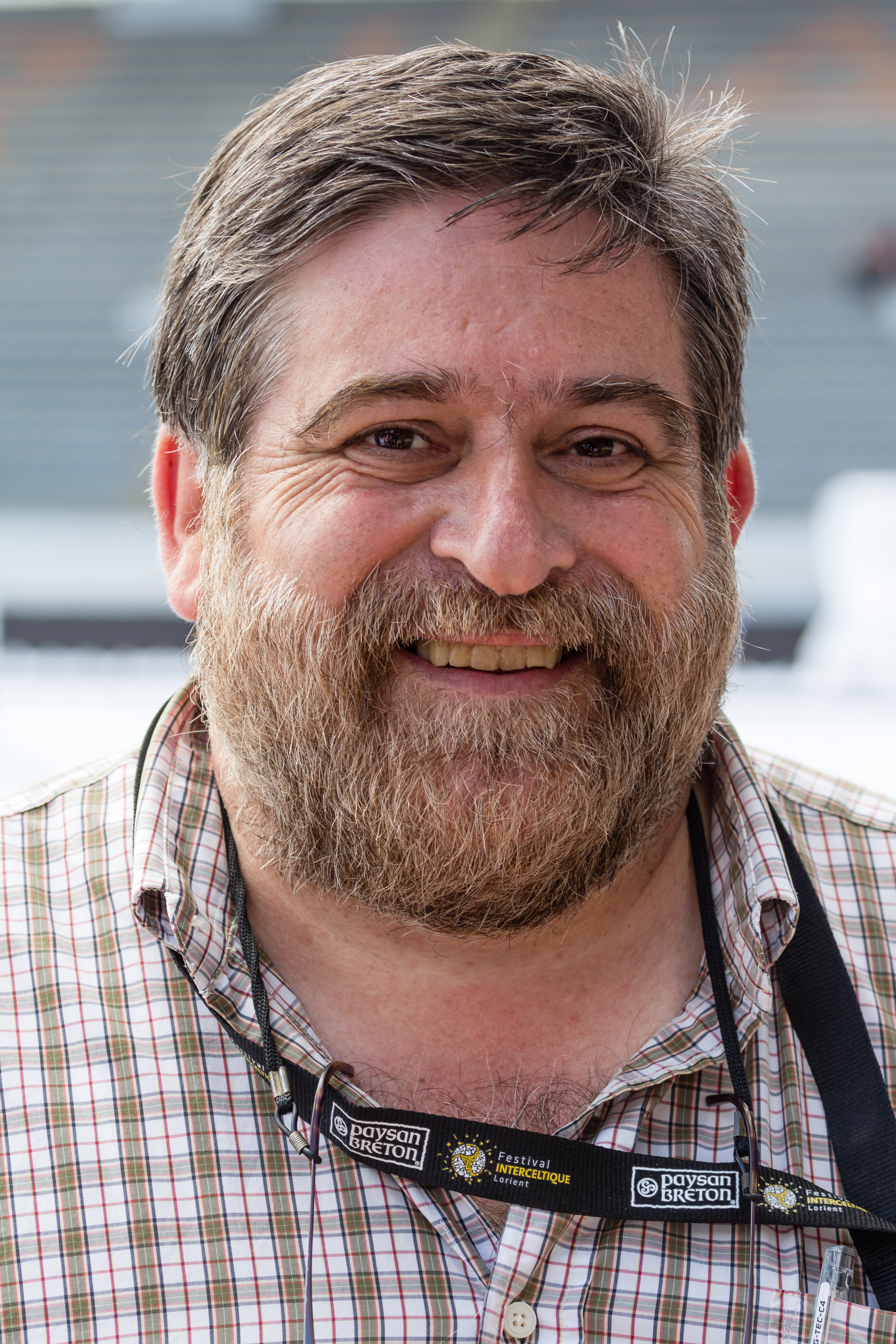
Lombardia in 2012

Lisardo Lombardía Yenes (Pola de Laviana, 10 February, 1955) is a Spanish cultural organizer.

== Life ==
He studied medicine at the University of Oviedo, where he was the director of the university chorus from 1973 to 1983.

He later worked as a physician and was interested in cultural activities. He founded and directed the “Club Prensa Asturiana” in the publication La Nueva España (“The New Spain”, 1989-2007). He is responsible for the record label FonoAstur, worked for the Fundación Cultural Belenos, and was the director of the Festival Interceltique de Lorient (2007-2012).

He married the pediatrician Celia González Baschwitz in 1979 and they have two daughters.

== Awards ==
- Medalla de Asturias, 2015
- Chevalier des Arts et des Lettres, 2021
