= Marina Colasanti =

Italian-Brazilian writer, translator and journalist (1937–2025)

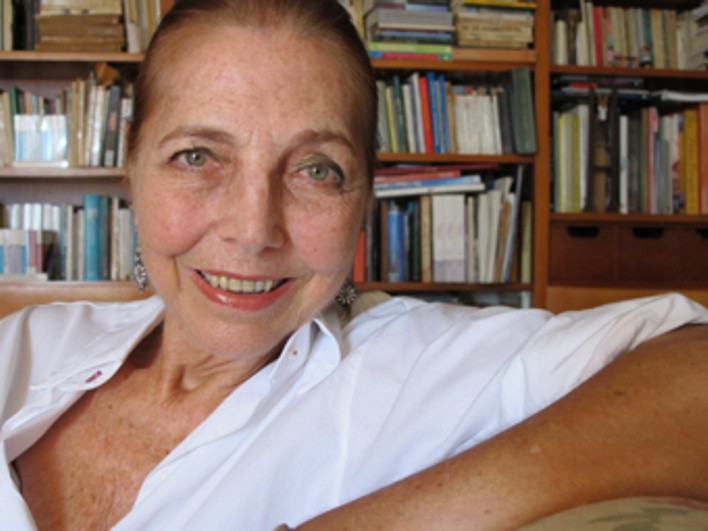
- Colasanti in 2012
- Born: 26 September 1937; Asmara, Italian Eritrea
- Died: 28 January 2025 (aged 87); Rio de Janeiro, Brazil
- Education: Escola Nacional de Belas Artes
- Years active: 1968–2021
- Spouse: Affonso Romano de Sant'Anna (m. 1971)
- Relatives: Arduino Colassanti (brother)

Marina Colasanti (26 September 1937 – 28 January 2025) was an Italian-Brazilian writer, translator and journalist. Colasanti published more than 70 books between 1968 and 2017, including works of poetry, collections of short stories and children's literature, and won Brazil's prestigious Prêmio Jabuti multiple times.

== Early life ==
Colasanti was born to Italian parents in Asmara, an old Italian colony in Eritrea, and lived in Tripoli, Libya during her infancy. Her family moved to Italy at the onset of World War II, where she lived for 11 years. Her family moved to Rio de Janeiro, Brazil in 1948 due to the difficult conditions in Europe after World War II.

Colasanti became interested in stories from a young age. At age six, her parents gifted her a set of abridged classics. She kept a diary from the age of nine.

Colasanti began painting as a teenager, and entered the National School of Fine Arts in 1952, where she specialized in etching.

== Career ==
=== Journalism ===
Colasanti first achieved recognition as a journalist and columnist for Jornal do Brasil, where she began working at age 22. Her first job at the paper was in the arts section, where she was an editor and illustrator. After the editor in charge of the children's section was detained under Brazil's military dictatorship, Colasanti was asked to step in. She left the paper in 1973. In 1975, she assisted in founding Nova, a woman's magazine. As an editor there, she published pieces on feminism and gender issues.

=== Writing ===
Colasanti published more than 70 books, including works of poetry, collections of short stories and children's literature. Many of her original works focused on travel and women and women's issues. She also worked as a translator of Italian literature.

She published her first book, Eu Sozinha, in 1968. Colasanti published an original short story in Jornal do Brasil, where she worked as an editor, which sparked her interest in writing and rewriting fairy tales. Many of her short stories were originally published in the Jornal, and later compiled and published as short story collections. She published her first children's book, Uma idéia toda azul (A True Blue Idea), in 1978. The book, a collection of original fairy tales which also featured her own illustrations, saw great success, and was also published in France, Spain, Latin America, and the United States. She wrote her first book of poetry in 1993.

Colasanti won the Prêmio Jabuti ten times.

=== Feminist work ===
Colasanti was a feminist, publishing four non-fiction books on the subject, including Mulher daqui pra frente in 1981. In 1985, she was nominated to the first National Council for Women's Rights.

== Personal life ==
Colasanti married the writer Affonso Romano de Sant'Anna in 1971; the couple had two daughters.

Colasanti died in Rio de Janeiro at the age of 87 on 28 January 2025.

== Prizes ==
- 1978 O Melhor para o Jovem, from the Fundação Nacional do Livro Infantil e Juvenil, for Uma idéia toda azul
- 1993
  - Prêmio Jabuti: Best Children's Book, for Entre a espada e a rosa
  - Prêmio Jabuti: Poetry, for Rota de colisão
- 1994 Prêmio Jabuti: Best Children's Book, for Ana Z., aonde vai você?
- 1997 Prêmio Jabuti: Contos, for Eu Sei, Mas Não Devia
- 2009 Prêmio Jabuti
- 2010 Prêmio Jabuti: Poetry, for Passageira em trânsito
- 2011 Prêmio Jabuti: Best Children's Book, for Antes de virar gigante e outras histórias
- 2014 Prêmio Jabuti: Fiction Book of the Year, for Breve História de um Pequeno Amor
- 2017 Premio Iberoamericano SM de Literatura Infantil y Juvenil
- 2024
  - Hans Christian Andersen Award Finalist
  - Prêmio Jabuti: Literary Personality of the Year
- Prêmio Machado de Assis

== Works ==
- Tudo Tem Princípio e Fim. 2017. ISBN 978-8583820598.
- Acontece na cidade. Ática. 2005.
- O homem que não parava de crescer. Global Editora. 2005. ISBN 9788526009820.
- Uma estrada junto ao rio. 2005. ISBN 978-8532255792.
- A amizade abana o rabo. 2001. ISBN 9788516030919.
- Esse amor de todos nós. 2000. ISBN 978-8532511676.
- Um amor sem palavras. 1995. ISBN 978-8526006492.
- De mulheres, sobre tudo. Editora Ediouro. 1993. ISBN 85-00-92662-7.
- Ofélia, a ovelha. 1989.
- O menino que achou uma estrela. 1988. ISBN 978-8526006485.
- Aqui entre nós. Rocco. 1988. OCLC 317697631.
- Um amigo para sempre. 1988. ISBN 9788596010429.
- O verde brilha no poço. 1986. ISBN 978-85-260-0662-1.
- Doze reis e a moça no labirinto do vento. 1982.
- A morada do ser. 1978. ISBN 978-8501069283.

=== Children's books ===
- Doze reis e a moça no labirinto do vento. 1978. ISBN 978-85-260-1108-3.
- Uma idéia toda azul. 1978. ISBN 978-8526006171.
- A menina arco iris. 1984. ISBN 978-8526012028.
- Lobo e o carneiro no sonho da menina. 1985. ISBN 978-8526012097.
- Será que tem asas?. Editora Quinteto. 1989.
- A mão na massa. 1990. ISBN 978-8561521387.
- Cada bicho seu capricho. Melhoramentos. 1992. ISBN 9788506013526.
- Entre a espada e a rosa. Salamandra. 1992.
- Ana Z., aonde vai você?. Ática. 1994.
- A moça tecelã. Global. 2004.
- Antes de virar gigante e outras histórias. 2011.
- Quando a primavera chegar. Global. 2017.

=== Fiction ===
- Breve História de um Pequeno Amor. 2014.

==== Novellas ====
- Eu Sozinha. 1968.

=== Essays and memoirs ===
- Mulher daqui pra frente. Nordica. 1981.
- E por falar em amor. Rocco. 1984.
- Intimidade pública. 1990.
- Eu sei mas não devia. Rocco. 1996.
- A casa das palavras. Ática. 2002.
- Fragatas para terras distantes. 2004.
- Minha guerra alheia. 2010.
- Vozes de Batalha. Tusquets. 2021.

=== Poetry ===
- Rota de colisão. Rocco. 1994.
- Gargantas abertas. Rocco. 1998.
- Fino sangue. Record. 2005.
- Minha Ilha Maravilha. Ática. 2007. ISBN 9788508110667.
- Passageira em trânsito. 2010.

=== Short story collections ===
- Zooilogico. Imago. 1975.
- Contos de amor rasgado. Rocco. 1986.
- Histórias de amor. Para gostar de ler. Vol. 22. Ática. 1997. ISBN 978-8508154586.
- Longe como o meu querer. Ática. 1997.
- O leopardo é um animal delicado. Rocco. 1998.
- Penélope manda lembranças. Ática. 2001.
- 23 histórias de um viajante. Global Editora. 2005.
- Hora de alimentar serpentes. 2013.

=== Translated works ===
- Collodi, Carlo (2002). Aventuras de pinóquio: histórias de uma marionete (in Portuguese). Translated by Colasanti, Marina.
