= Chafik =

Chafik is a masculine given name and surname of Arabic origin. Notable people with the name include:

== Given name ==
- Chafik Besseghier (born 1989), French figure skater
- Chafik Bouaoud (born 1999), Algerian sports shooter
- Chafik Charobim (1894–1975), Egyptian artist
- Chafik Najih (born 1983), French footballer
- Chafik Rachadi (born 1963), Moroccan politician
- Chafik Tigroudja (born 1992), French footballer

== Surname ==
- Fouad Chafik (born 1986), French-Moroccan footballer
- Mohamed Chafik (born 1926), Moroccan writer and linguist
- Nadia Chafik (born 1962), Moroccan novelist
