= Frassinelli =

Frassinelli is an Italian surname. Notable people with this surname include:

- Adriano Frassinelli (born 1943), Italian bobsledder
- Attilio R. Frassinelli (1907–1976), American politician
- Roberto Frassinelli (1811–1887), German archaeologist, naturalist, bibliophile, and draftsman
