= Basílica de Santa María la Real de Covadonga =

Coordinates: 43°18′31″N 5°03′13″W

Basílica de Santa María la Real de Covadonga/Cuadonga
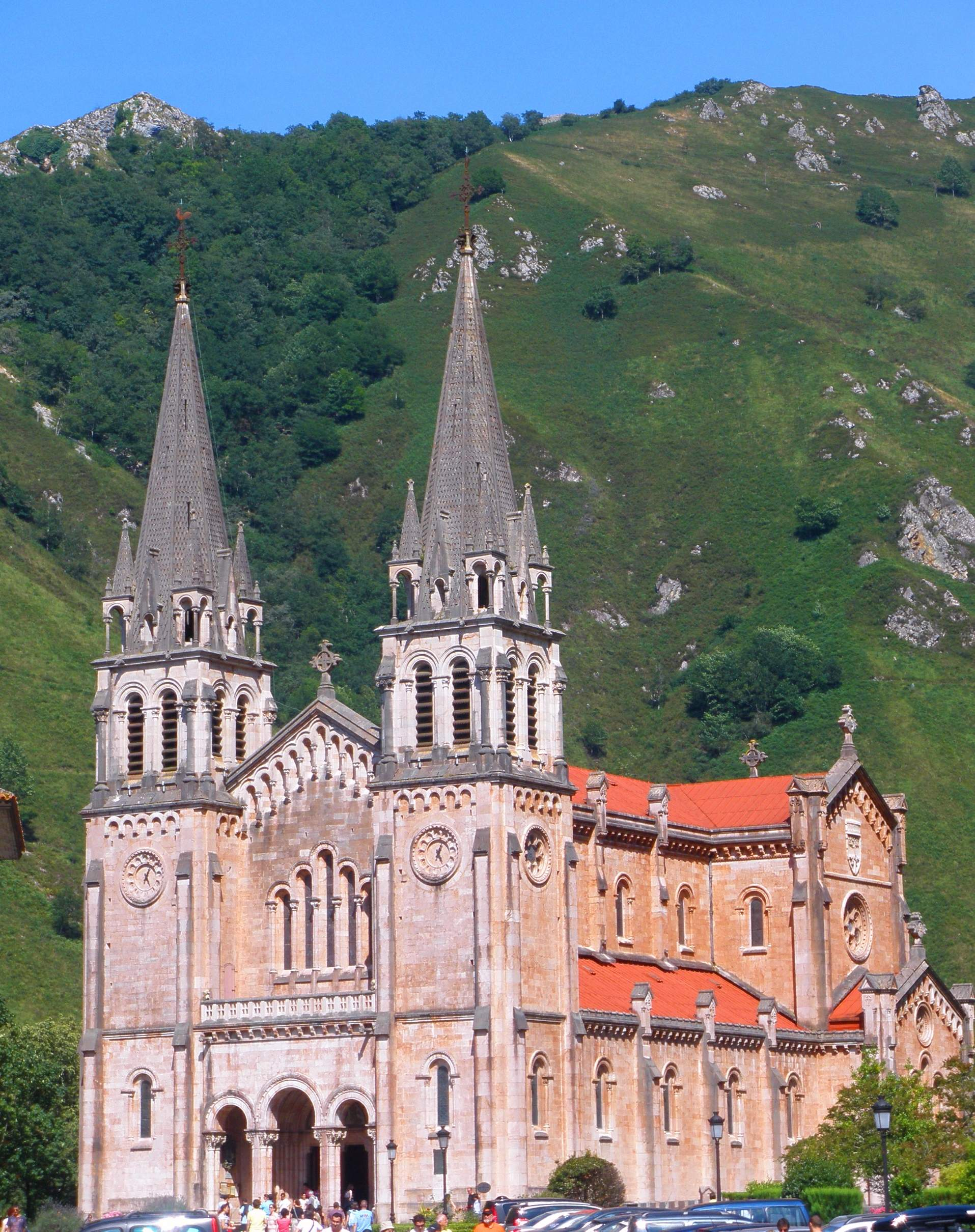
- Basílica de Santa María la Real de Covadonga/Cuadonga
- Location: Covadonga/Cuadonga, Cangas de Onís/Cangues d'Onís, Asturias
- Country: Spain
- Denomination: Basilica

History
- Status: Basilica
- Dedication: Our Lady of Covadonga
- Consecrated: September 11, 1901

Architecture
- Functional status: Active
- Architect(s): Roberto Frassinelli (design); Federico Aparici (construction)
- Style: Neo-Romanesque
- Groundbreaking: 1877
- Completed: 1901

The Basílica de Santa María la Real de Covadonga(English: Basilica of Holy Mary, the Queen of Covadonga) is a Catholic church located in Covadonga/Cuadonga, Cangas de Onís/Cangues d'Onís, Asturias, Spain, that was designated as a basilica on September 11, 1901.

The temple was designed by the German architect Roberto Frassinelli and built between 1877 and 1901 by architect Federico Aparici y Soriano. It is a Neo-Romanesque church made entirely of pink limestone.

== History ==
In 1777 a fire destroyed the old temple, which stood adjacent to the Holy Cave where Our Lady of Covadonga is revered. It was then decided to raise a new church as a monumental sanctuary, raising donations from all of Spain; the plan was opposed by the local council, as the canons wanted to rebuild the temple of the Holy Cave and build an ambitious sanctuary that had once been designed by Ventura Rodríguez, but never completed.

One century later, the project was resumed by Alfonso XII, King of Spain who was interested in completing this work. The classic design of Ventura Rodríguez was very difficult and expensive and was replaced by a new neo-Medieval design.

This new project was devised by Roberto Frassinelli, known as The German of Corao, who was more an artist than architect, and was replaced by Federico Aparici y Soriano, who studied at the Royal Academy of Fine Arts of San Fernando. Despite this decision, Frassinelli could direct the works.

== Esplanade ==
- La Campanona (The Big Bell), a three-meter bell built in 1900 at La Felguera. It weighs 4,000 kg and was donated by Italian count Sizzo-Noris.
- Bronze statue of Pelagius, made in 1964 by Eduardo Zaragoza.
- The Obelisk with the Victory Cross, built in 1857 by Philippe d'Orléans, Duke of Montpensier. According to tradition, it was the place where Pelagius was crowned as the first King of Asturies.
- San Pedro Monastery, declared Bien de Interés Cultural, founded by Alfonso I of Asturias.

== See also ==
- Asturian art
- Catholic Church in Spain
