= Chafik Rachadi =

Moroccan politician

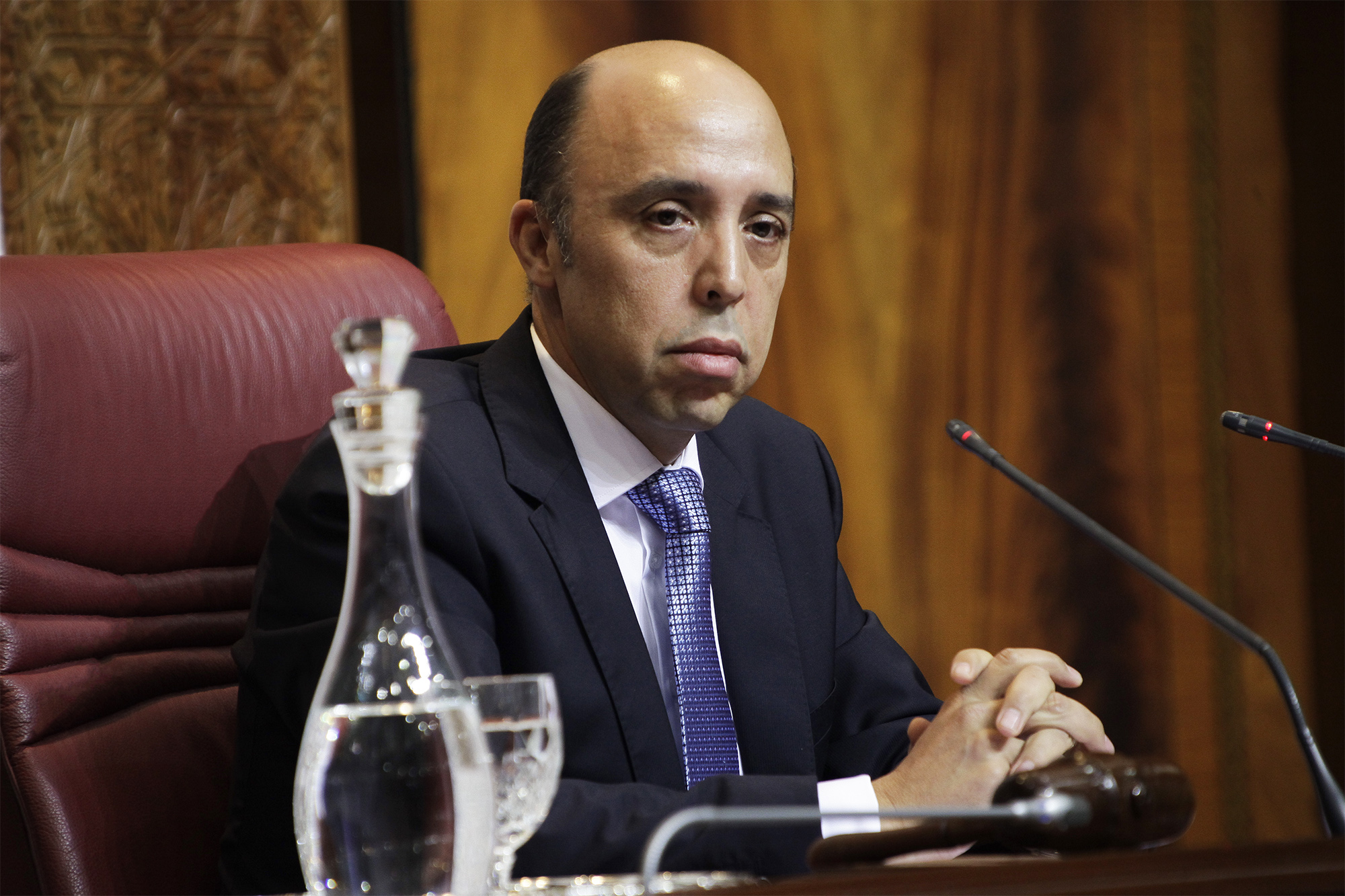
- Ambassador of His Majesty the King to the Republic of Korea

Deputy speaker of the House of Representatives - (Moroccan Parliament)
- In office 2013–2016

President of the Chamber of Commerce, Industry and services (CCIS) of Settat, Benslimane and Berrechid provinces
- In office 2003–2015
- Preceded by: M. Ahmed Abou Al Hassan BENYAHIA
- Succeeded by: M. Mustapha AMHAL

President of the Parliamentary RNI's group
- In office 2011–2012
- Preceded by: M. Mohamed ABBOU
- Succeeded by: M. Rachid Talbi Alami

First vice-president of the Arab Labor Organization (ALO) (Organization of the Arab League)
- In office 2009–2011

Personal details
- Born: October 21, 1963 Marrakesh, Morocco
- Party: National Rally of Independents
- Education: University of Perpignan

Chafik Rachadi (Arabic: شفيق رشادي; born October 21, 1963) is a Moroccan politician.

== Education and law career ==
Rachadi obtained a B.A. in Business Administration from Montreal (1987), a degree in international management from Fontainebleau (1995), a Master in Finance and Management Control from Orleans (2000), and a PhD in Private Law, under the theme: Industrial property in light of the jurisprudence in comparative law, from Perpignan (2004).

From 1989 until 2016, Rachadi chaired a Moroccan company specializing in the assembly of European and Asian industrials vehicles.

== Political career ==
Since 2002, Rachadi was a Member of the House of Representatives –Moroccan parliament. From 2007 until 2009, he was a member of the board of the House of Representatives and since 2008 he has managed and published the Magazine of the House of Representatives. From 2013 until 2016, he was the vice-president of the House of Representatives.

From 2001 until 2016, he was the president of the Industrialists Association of Berrechid(AIB). From 2003 until 2015, he was President of the Chamber of Commerce, Industry and services "CCIS" of Settat and Vice-President of the Federation of Moroccan Chambers of Commerce, Industry and Services(FCMCIS). From 2009 until 2011, he was the first vice president of the Arab Labour Organization. In 2010, he was honoured by the Arab Organization working in its 37th edition in Bahrain in 2010 as Distinguished Arab Manager, "recognized for his involvement in supporting labours in all its components nationally, regionally and internationally."

From 2005 until 2016, he was the general secretary of the Association of Professional of Trucks and Body Builders(GPLC). From 2006 until 2009, he was also active in academic circles as lecturer at Hassan 1st University in Settat. From 2008 until 2013, he served as a member of the Competition Council, the Moroccan Agency of Development of the Investments(AMDI) and in Moroccan Office of the Industrial and Commercial Property (OMPIC).

From 2011 until 2016, he chaired several Moroccan delegations of businessmen and members of Parliament; in which, he made multidisciplinary interventions in Arabic, French and English languages, in: the United States, Canada, United Kingdom, Kingdom of Saudi Arabia, Republic of Lebanon, Kingdom of Bahrain, Hashemite Kingdom of Jordan, Arab Republic of Egypt, Scandinavian countries, African countries, France, Portugal, Germany, Brussels, Romania.

From 2011 until 2012, he also served as chairman of the parliamentary group of National Rally of Independents - RNI "54 members". From 2014 until 2016, he led and facilitated several projects and partnerships between the House of Representatives and other partners, such as the World Bank, Westminster Foundation for Democracy, the European Union, French National Assembly and the House of Commons in activities supporting and building the capacities of the Parliament in terms of legislation, evaluation of public policies, accountability, oversight and E-parliament.

Rachadi was appointed as Ambassador of the Kingdom of Morocco to the Republic of Korea by His Majesty the King Mohammed VI in October 2016.
