= Jacqueline Assaël =

French Hellenist

Jacqueline Assaël (born 7 August 1957, Marseille) is a French Hellenist and a professor of Greek language and literature at the University of Nice Sophia Antipolis since 2004. She is also an essayist and poet.

Assaël is a specialist in the works of the tragic Greek poet Euripides, and she has also published works on the phenomenon of poetic inspiration in Antiquity. Also a philologist, she has also created some works of New Testament exegesis.

== Biography ==
Jacqueline Assaël studied classics at the University of Provence, where she obtained a doctorate in 1987. After passing the agrégation in 1980, she taught in high schools, first in Marseille and then in Liévin. In 1983 she was named assistant professor of Greek at the University of Perpignan, then went to the University of Nice in 1990. She was promoted to the role of professor there in 2004.

She began to publish poetry and essays in 1999, in journals (Souffles, Encres vives, ARPA, Autre Sud, La main millénaire, Recours au poème, Nunc, Les Cahiers du Sens) and with various publishing houses (La Porte, Clapàs, Corlevour, etc.). Patrick Cabanel remarks that "these titles reveal that this poetry mixes, as Roland Barthes would have said, at least three Mediterraneans: Greek, Judeo-Christian, and 'Cévenole,' in the broad sense."

She is a member of the editorial committees of the journals Loxias and Foi et Vie.

== Published works ==
=== Academic works ===
- Intellectualité et théâtralité dans l’œuvre d’Euripide, Publ. de la Fac. des Lettres de Nice, 1993.
- Jacqueline Assaël (éd.), L’antique notion d’inspiration, revue Noesis, 4, 2000, Nice.
- Euripide, philosophe et poète tragique, Peeters, Namur, 2001. Prix Zappas 2002. ISBN 978-9042910621
- Jacqueline Assaël (éd.), Labyrinthes et métamorphoses, Actes de la table ronde « Œdipe, Sisyphe, Ovide aujourd’hui », Nice, Faculté des Lettres, 31 mars 2005, in Résurgence des mythes, N° spécial 212 de la revue Souffles, Montpellier, décembre 2005.
- Pour une poétique de l’inspiration, d’Homère à Euripide, Peeters, Namur, 2006.
- L’épître de Jacques, Labor et Fides, Genève, 2013 (en collaboration avec Élian Cuvillier).
- « Au miroir de la Parole ». Lecture de l’épître de Jacques, (Cahiers Évangile 167), Paris, Éditions du Cerf, 2014 (en collaboration avec Élian Cuvillier).
- Euripide. Alceste, dans les Silves grecques 2015-2016, Neuilly, Éditions Atlande, 2015.
- Jacqueline Assaël (éd.), Euripide et l'imagination aérienne, 2015, Paris, L'Harmattan, coll. Thyrse, 6.
- Jacqueline Assaël (éd., en collaboration avec Andreas Markantonatos), "Orphism and Greek Tragedy", Trends in Classics, Berlin, De Gruyter, 2016, 8/2.

=== Poetry ===
- De l’âpreté des drailles, Colomiers, Encres vives, 2000.
- Voilier - Sirène, Encres Vives, Colomiers, 2001.
- Place de l’Horloge et contrepoint, Encres Vives, Colomiers, 2001.
- Dionysiaques, Encres Vives, Colomiers, 2002.
- Circé des amours libertaires, Encres Vives, Colomiers, 2002.
- Le faune du vieil étang ermite, La Porte, Laon, 2002.
- Janus et la méduse, La licorne, Bourg-de-Thizy, 2004.
- Catalyse, Souffles, Montpellier, 2008.
- Gospel pour un peintre, Clapàs, Millau, 2009.
- Les orpailleurs de Dieu, Clapàs, Millau, 2012.
- Dialogue des gentianes, L'Harmattan, Paris, 2015.

=== Essays ===
- Petit traité de fol Espoir, Olivétan, Lyon, 2009.
- Le mémorial des limules. Essay on Frédéric Jacques Temple's poetry. Suivi d’un Dialogue entre Jacqueline Assaël et Frédéric Jacques Temple, Clichy, Corlevour, 2012.
- Connaître, « naître ensemble », Tu, mio. Les particularités de Tu, mio comme roman d’apprentissage, Étude sur Erri De Luca, Nunc 28, 2012.
- « Les paradoxes de Iossif Ventura, poète crétois », Recours au poème, 2013.
- « Et il dit ». Étude sur Erri De Luca, Recours au poème, 2013.
- « Frédéric Jacques Temple : la poésie des sept points cardinaux », direction du dossier Frédéric Jacques Temple, Nunc 30, 2013.

=== Television show (on DVD) ===
- Le temps de le dire. Jacqueline Assaël, France Télévisions, France 2, Couleur 30 min. Format 16:9. Stereo. 13/03/11.

== Awards ==
- Prix Zappas (2002)

== Bibliography ==
- Patrick Cabanel, « Jacqueline Assaël », in Patrick Cabanel et André Encrevé (dir.), Dictionnaire biographique des protestants français de 1787 à nos jours, tome 1 : A-C, Les Éditions de Paris Max Chaleil, Paris, 2015, p. 34-35 ISBN 978-2846211901
