= Jeannie Mah =

Canadian ceramic artist (born 1952)

- Born: 1952 (age 73–74); Regina, Saskatchewan
- Education: University of Regina, Emily Carr Institute of Art and Design
- Known for: ceramic artist

Jeannie Mah (born 1952) is a Canadian ceramic artist who is known for creating ceramic vessels that function as thought-provoking sculptures.

== Education ==
Mah was born in Regina, Saskatchewan, and attended the University of Regina where she received a Bachelor of Education (1976). In 1979, she received an Advanced Diploma in Ceramics from Emily Carr Institute of Art and Design. In 1988, Mah completed a Certificat Practique de Langue Françaises at the Université de Perpignan, in Perpignan, France. In 1989, she received a Diplôme Semestriel de Langue et Civilisation Françaises from the Université de la Sorbonne, in Paris, France. She returned to the University of Regina in 1993 to complete a Bachelor of Arts degree.

== Publications ==
Mah was a co-editor along with Lorne Beug and Anne Campbell of a book on the cultural geography of Regina, titled: Regina's Secret Spaces: Love and Lore of Local Geography (published in 2006).

== Art ==
Mah's work is made by hand, and some include various reflections upon historical events. Much of her work is focused on crafting vessels. Her art has been influenced by the shape and decoration of both the Kamares ware cups from Crete and the Sèvres ware teacups from France. Her works are often designed more for decoration than for practical use. They are often decorated with images such as historical images, landscapes and self-portraits. Mah's work as an ardent cineaste, francophile, and video artist also have an obvious influence on her ceramic sculptures. She credits Regina artist Jack Sures with inspiring her practice.

Curator Helen Marzolf described Mah's ceramic works as "ethereal ... [the] cups, vases and pitchers are paper-thin, translucent and weightless. More than objects of technical virtuosity, these works hyperbolize the fragility of fine ceramics and the elasticity of porcelain."

Her work has been shown in various exhibitions in Canada and internationally.

=== Canada ===
- The Godfrey Dean Art Gallery (2012, 2013)
- Winnipeg Art Gallery (1999)
- Saskatchewan Arts Board
- MacKenzie Art Gallery
- Canadian Clay and Glass Gallery
- Nouveau Gallery (2006, 2007, 2008, 2009, 2012, 2013, 2014)
- Burlington Art Gallery
- Museum of Civilization

=== International ===
- Municipalité de Nyon (Switzerland)
