= Graciano García García =

Spanish journalist

Graciano García García (born in Moreda (Asturias) on 12 October 1939) is a Spanish journalist.

He holds a degree from the Official Journalism School of Madrid.

In 1961 he began his professional career at the newspaper La Nueva España in Oviedo, while collaborating with diverse national publications. On 24 May 1969 he founded the Asturias Semanal magazine, which became a vehicle for expressing the voice of democratic sentiment in Asturias, which he directed from its beginnings until 1977.

In 1978 he was promoter and director of Asturias Diario Regional newspaper, where he remained until 26 June 1979.

Graciano García has been the promoter of pioneering cultural and journalistic enterprises in Asturias engaged in the struggle for freedom. In 1989 he founded Ediciones Nobel, which has published works of great value and cultural richness since its inception. Currently focused on European and Latin American markets, Nobel has offices in several countries. Due to his initiative, 1996 saw the creation of literary magazine Clarín, one of the most important in this speciality, and recipient of the "Jovellanos" International Essay Award, one of the most prestigious Spanish-language prizes, which is granted annually since 1994.

On 24 September 1980, with the support of the Royal House and in the presence of the King and Queen of Spain and the Prince of Asturias, he created—together with other Asturians and especially with the help of then General Secretary of the Royal House, Sabino Fernández Campo—the Prince of Asturias Foundation. Since 1981 this institution has granted the Prince of Asturias Awards, aimed at the recognition of outstanding scientific, technical, cultural, social and humanistic work performed by individuals, groups or institutions worldwide, with priority being given to those nations belonging to the Ibero-American community.

Graciano García was married on 10 October 1970 to María Josefa Cervero, with whom he has two children.

== Awards and honours ==
Graciano García was awarded the Order of Civil Merit by the King of Spain in 1984. He was given the keys to the city of Oviedo in 1995, having already been named Asturian Person of the Year by the local and regional newspaper, La Nueva España, in 1981. He was made Knight Commander of the Order of Rio Branco by the government of Brazil in 2004. In September 2005 the Government of the Principality of Asturias awarded him the Autonomous Region's highest honour, the Gold Medal of Asturias. This award is conferred on rare occasions and has been bestowed on such public figures as the Prince of Asturias, scientists Severo Ochoa and Grande Covián and Sabino Fernández Campo, the Count of Latores.

In September 2006 he was given the Medal for Police Merit by the Spanish Ministry for Justice and Interior. The Avilés city council awarded him the city's gold medal in October 2006 and in February 2007 he was named Honorary Citizen of Aller by the Aller Town Council. That same year, the Ministry of Foreign Affairs and Cooperation's Diplomatic School awarded him both the Carlos III Medal, its highest honour, and a gold medal. He was also awarded a gold medal by the Veterinaries' Association of the Principality of Asturias, as well as the Cross of the Order of Merit of the Civil Guard with a white ribbon. In 2008, the International School of Protocol awarded him its gold medal. In addition, he received the Manzana de Oro from the Asturian Centre of Madrid in 1996, the Businessman and Professional of the Year Award, from Astur Manager (2000), Puerta de Asturias (2000), Master de Oro, from the Forum for Top Management (2002), Madreña de Oro, from the Asturian Centre of Seville (2002) and Faba de Oro (2004).
