= Frederic Monneyron =

French writer and academic

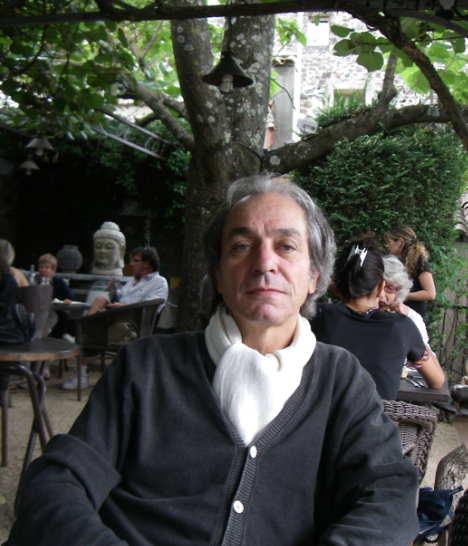
- Born: March 25, 1954 (age 72); Paris, France

Academic background
- Education: University of Montpellier I University of Paris IV-Sorbonne

Academic work
- Discipline: sociology
- Institutions: University of California; University of Abidjan; Cadi Ayyad University; University of Burgundy; University of South Florida; Stendhal University; University of Perpignan Via Domitia; Mod'Art International
- Main interests: gender relations fashion

Frederic Monneyron is a French writer and academic.

== Life ==
Born on March 25, 1954, in Paris, of Swiss descent, Monneyron spent his youth in the United Kingdom and Sweden, later living in Africa, Morocco and the United States. Monneyron currently lives in Montpellier, France.

Monneyron received his Doctorat d'Etat en science politique from the University of Montpellier I in 1984 and his Doctorat d'Etat ès lettres et sciences humaines from the University of Paris IV-Sorbonne in 1986. He taught at the University of California, the University of Abidjan, and the Cadi Ayyad University between 1980 and 1988. Monneyron taught at the University of Burgundy, the University of South Florida and Stendhal University between 1988 and 1998.

Monneyron is a full Professor in comparative and general literature at the University of Perpignan Via Domitia and is the head of the MBA "Fashion industries and luxury goods" at Mod'Art International, Paris, coming to teach sociology of fashion in the English-taught programme. He also teaches sociology, political science and aesthetics at the University Paul Valéry-Montpellier and sociology of fashion at the University of Geneva and at the University of Barcelona and is a Distinguished visiting professor at the University of South Florida, the University of Milan and the University of Bologna. Besides, he is an expert to the European Commission in Brussels (research directorate).

His works focused on sexuality, gender relations (Thèse d'Etat es lettres et sciences humaines : L'Imaginaire androgyne; L'Ecriture de la jalousie; Séduire), clothes, fashion and luxury (La Frivolité essentielle; La Mode et ses enjeux, La Sociologie de la mode, La Photographie de mode, Le Luxe, L'Imaginaire du luxe, Fashion. a Theory) on the one hand; on the ideas of nation and race (La Nation aujourd'hui, L'Imaginaire racial, L'Idée de race), on Europe (Thèse d'Etat de science politique: Les Neutres et l'intégration européenne) and the US (Au Cœur des Etats-Unis) on the other hand.

He is the author of more than thirty books translated in major languages and is the editor of around fifteen collective works among which five conferences he organized at the Cerisy International Center (L'Androgyne, La Jalousie, La Misogynie, Le Masculin, Le Vêtement) .

He is also a novelist (Dossier diplomatique, Le Voyage d'un séducteur, Le Nihiliste, Après le désir, Une vie de piscines, Helter Skelter...), a short stories writer (Sans Nom et autres nouvelles), and a translator from English into French (A. K. Coomaraswamy, E. Wharton, P. G. Wodehouse, T.D. Allman)

On topics such as fashion, luxury, sexuality and seduction, he granted numerous interviews to the magazines and the radio and appeared on television programmes.

== Bibliography ==
=== Essays ===
- L'Androgyne romantique. Du mythe au mythe littéraire (Grenoble, ELLUG, 1994, ISBN 2 902709 88 9; 2009)
- L'Androgyne décadent. Mythe, figure, fantasmes (Grenoble, ELLUG, 1996, ISBN 2 902709 94 3; 2011)
- L'Écriture de la jalousie (Grenoble, ELLUG, 1996, ISBN 2 84310 003 8)
- Bisexualité et littérature. Autour de D. H. Lawrence et Virginia Woolf, (Paris, L'Harmattan, 1998, ISBN 2-7384-6363-0)
- Séduire, l'imaginaire de la séduction de Don Giovanni à Mick Jagger (Paris, PUF, 1997, ISBN 2 13 0481108; 2000; Paris, Imago, 2016, ISBN 978-2-84952-865-5)
- La Nation aujourd'hui. Formes et mythes (Paris, L'Harmattan, 2000, ISBN 2-7384-9850-7)
- La Frivolité essentielle. Du vêtement et de la mode (Paris, PUF, 2001, ISBN 2 13 051653 X; paperback Quadrige, 2008, 2014)
- Mythes et littérature (Paris, PUF, 2002, ISBN 2 13 053036 2; 2012, 2019 with Joël Thomas, translated in Spanish)
- L'imaginaire racial (Paris, L'Harmattan, 2004, ISBN 2-7475-6846-6)
- La Mode et ses enjeux (Paris, Klincksieck, 2005, ISBN 2-252-03533-1; 2010, translated in Spanish and Portuguese)
- L'Automobile. Un imaginaire contemporain (Paris, Imago, 2006, ISBN 2-84952-030-6; with Joël Thomas)
- La Sociologie de la mode (Paris, PUF, 2006, ISBN 2 13 055517 9; 2010, 2013, 2015, 2017, 2019, 2021, translated in Japanese, Italian and Spanish)
- Sociologie de l'imaginaire, with Patrick Legros, Patrick Tacussel et Jean-Bruno Renard (Paris, Armand Colin, coll. Cursus, 2006, ISBN 2-200-26663-4, translated in Portuguese and Italian)
- Le Monde hippie. De l'imaginaire psychédélique à la révolution informatique (Paris, Imago, 2008 ISBN 978-2-84952-061-1, with Martine Xiberras)
- La Photographie de mode. Un art souverain (Paris, PUF, coll. Perspectives critiques, 2010, ISBN 978-2-13-057874-1)
- Au cœur des États-Unis. Mythes, imaginaires et fictions (Paris, Michel Houdiard Éditeur, 2011,ISBN 978-2-35692-064-5)
- L'Idée de race. Histoire d'une fiction (Paris, Berg International, 2012, ISBN 978-2-917191-48-4, with Gérard Siary)
- Vanity. Mode/Fotografie aus der Sammlung F.C. Gunlach (Wien, Kunsthalle für Moderne Kunst, Stiftung F.C. Gundlach, 2012, ISBN 3869842709, mit Synne Genzmer)
- La Séduction, (UPPR, 2015, ISBN 978-2-37168-023-4; 2016)
- La Mode, (UPPR, 2015, ISBN 978-2-37168-022-7; 2016)
- Le Luxe, (UPPR, 2015, ISBN 978-2-37168-033-3; 2017)
- L'Imaginaire du luxe (Paris, Imago, 2015, with Patrick Mathieu,ISBN 2849528528 translated in Chinese)
- Luxe (Paris, Michel de Maule, 2017, with Patrick Mathieu, ISBN 2876235277)
- Mythe et nation (UPPR, 2017, ISBN 978-2-37168-236-8)
- Des sexes et des genres (UPPR, 2019, ISBN 978-2-37168-264-1)
- Mythe et race (Entremises, 2021, (ISBN 978-2-38255-068-7))
- De la beauté (Entremises, 2022, (ISBN 978-2-38255-026-7))
- Nations, races, sexes. Pérennité et changement de mythes (Brussels, EME, 2022, (ISBN 978-2-8066-3762-8))
- Fashion, A Theory (OpenCulture, 2025 (ISBN 979-10-431-1177-8))
- De la célébrité (SHS Editions, 2025 (ISBN 979-10-431-1180-8 translated in German, Italian, Spanish)
- Philosophie de la décoration d'intérieur, (Montréal, Liber, 2025 (ISBN 978-2-89578-840-9))
- La Beaute peut-elle sauver le monde? (La Fabrique, 2026 (ISBN 979-1043128011))
- Joli visage (La Fabrique, 2026 (ISBN 979-1043128004), with Jacques Sojcher)
- Les Mannequins. Corps vécus, corps représentés (OpenCulture, 2026 (ISBN 979-1043129049), with Marie-Louise Pierson)
- On Celebrity (SHS Editions, 2026 (ISBN 979-1041940394)

=== Editor ===
- L'Androgyne dans la littérature (Paris, Albin-Michel, 1990, ISBN 2-226-04018-8; Dervy-Livre, 2000, translated in Japanese)
- Misogynies (Paris, Deux Temps/Tierce, 1993, ISBN 2-903144-87-7)
- La Jalousie (Paris, L'Harmattan, 1996, ISBN 2-7384-4293-5)
- Le Masculin, Identité, fictions, dissémination (Paris, L'Harmattan, 1998, ISBN 2-7384-7017-3)
- Le Vêtement (Paris, L'Harmattan, 2001, ISBN 2-7475-1740-3)
- Vêtement et littérature (PUP, 2001, ISBN 2-908912-89-9)
- L'Entre-deux de la mode (Paris, L'Harmattan/Bergamo University Press, 2004, ISBN 2-7475-6789-3)
- Automobile et littérature (PUP, 2005, ISBN 2-914518-65-X)
- La France dans le regard des États-Unis/France as Seen by the United States (PUP/PUPV, 2007, ISBN 2-914518-92-7)
- Métaphysique de la mode (Paris/Bruxelles, Éditions du Cercle d'art, 2008, ISBN 9782702208663)
- Des mythes politiques (Paris, Imago, 2010, ISBN 978-2-84952-087-1, translated in Croatian)
- Sport et imaginaire (PULM, 2013, ISBN 978-2-36781-032-4)
- Le Surf et ses imaginaires (PULM, 2025 (ISBN 978-2-36781-557-2)

=== Prefaces ===
- Hela Ouardi (dir), L'Androgyne en littérature (Simpact, 2009, ISBN 978-2-915611-38-0)
- Michel Dion et Mariette Julien, Éthique de la mode féminine (PUF, 2010, ISBN 978-2-13-057815-4)
- Gilbert Durand, Chaque âge à ses plaisirs (Entremises, 2023, ISBN 978-2-37168-343-3))

=== Fiction ===
- Sans nom et autres nouvelles (Paris, L'Harmattan, 1999, ISBN 2-7384-7291-5)
- Dossier diplomatique (Paris, Michel de Maule, 2014, ISBN 978-2-87623-557-1)
- Le Voyage d'un séducteur (CSIPP, 2018, ISBN 9781719433273)
- Le Nihiliste (Paris, Sydney Laurent, 2019, (ISBN 979-10-326-1549-2))
- Après le désir (KDP, 2019 (ISBN 9781089064442))
- Une vie de piscines (Entremises, 2023 (ISBN 978-2-38255-092-2))
- Helter Skelter... (Culturea, 2024 (ISBN 979-10-419-8999-7))

=== Translations (from English into French) ===
- A. K. Coomaraswamy, La Philosophie chrétienne et orientale de l'art (Pardès, 1990, ISBN 2-86714-076-5)
- Edith Wharton, Voyage au Maroc (Paris/Monaco, Ed. du Rocher, 1996, ISBN 2-268-02220-X; rééd. Paris, Gallimard-L'Etrangère, 1998, puis Paris, Gallimard-L'imaginaire, 2001)
- P.G. Wodehouse, Courtes histoires de green (Paris, Michel de Maule, 2011, ISBN 978-2-87623-281-5)
- T.D. Allman, La Floride, coeur révélateur des Etats-Unis (Paris, Classiques Garnier, 2019, ISBN 978-2-406-08078-7)

=== Quotation ===
« Quand on change de vêtement, on change de comportement ». Excerpt from Libération - September 1, 2001.
