= Affonso Romano de Sant'Anna =

Brazilian poet, essayist and academic (1937–2025)

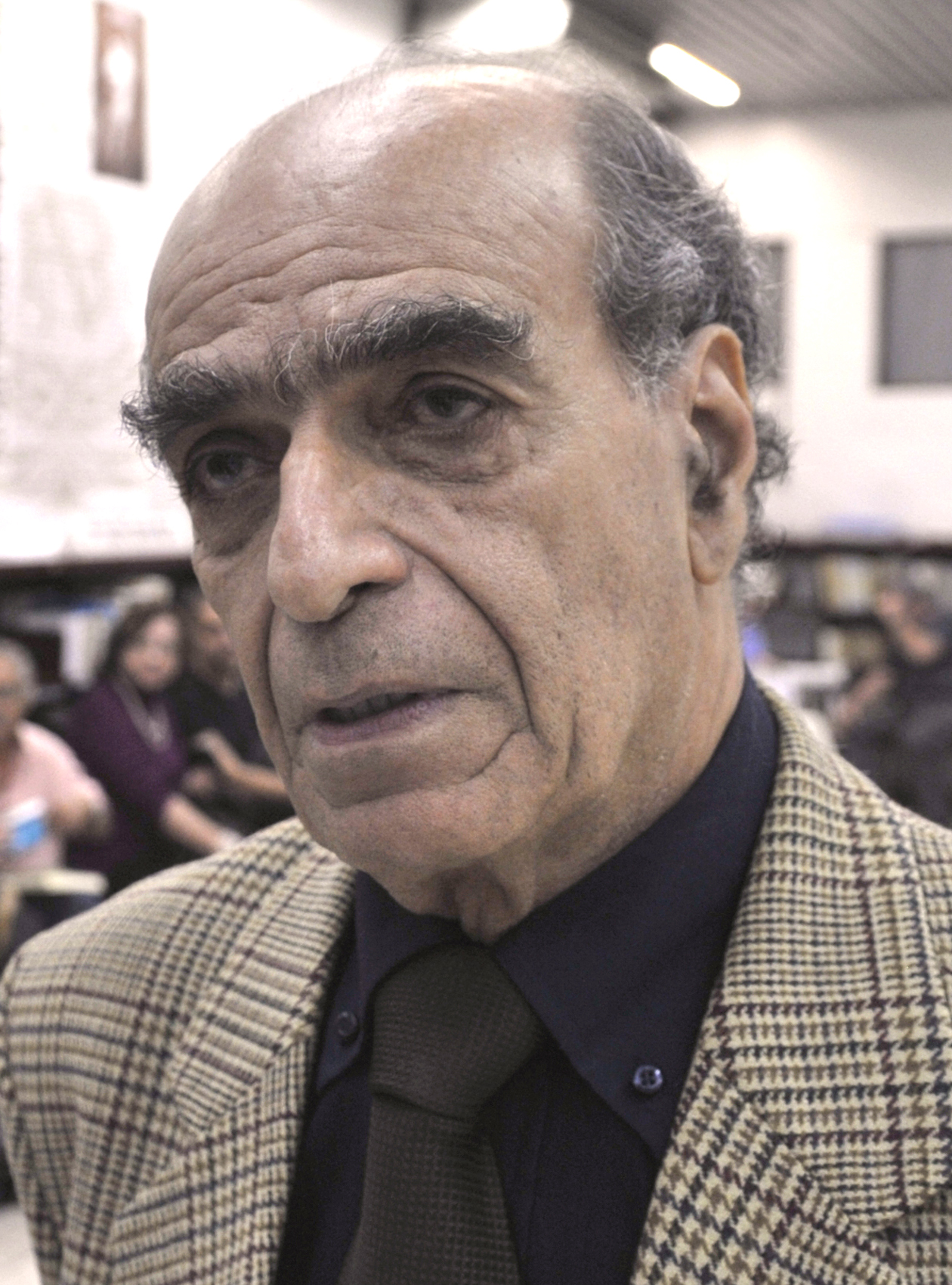
- Sant'Anna in 2011
- Born: 27 March 1937; Belo Horizonte, Minas Gerais, Brazil
- Died: 4 March 2025 (aged 87); Rio de Janeiro, Brazil
- Spouse: Marina Colasanti (m. 1971; died 2025)
- Children: 2

Affonso Romano de Sant'Anna (27 March 1937 – 4 March 2025) was a Brazilian poet, essayist and academic.

== Background ==
Sant'Anna was a professor of Brazilian literature at UCLA and the University of Texas at El Paso, and a writer for the O Globo newspaper. In 1971 he married Marina Colasanti, a Brazilian journalist and writer. In 1984, he began writing for Jornal do Brasil.

Sant'Anna died at his home in Rio de Janeiro, on 4 March 2025, at the age of 87.

== Works ==
- 1962 – O Desemprego da Poesia
- 1965 – Canto e Palavra (poem book)
- 1980 – Que país é este?
- 1986 – A Mulher Madura (book of articles for O Globo)
