= University of Perpignan Via Domitia =

French public university located in Perpignan

Coordinates: 42.6833°N 2.90167°E

University of Perpignan
- Université de Perpignan
- Type: Private
- Established: 1349; 677 years ago
- Affiliations: Vives network
- President: Yvan Auguet
- Vice-president: Annick Truffert, Sophie Massonn; Marià Mercè Pujol Berche, Samira El Yacoubi, Laurent Cavaignac, Caroline Perche, Sylvain Chatry, Jérôme Boissier, Hervé Blanchard, Jonathan Pollock (International Relations); Issouf Niang, Vice-Président étudiant
- Faculty: 450
- Students: 9,500
- Location: Perpignan, Languedoc-Roussillon, France
- Campus: Perpignan Narbonne, Carcassonne, Font-Romeu, Mende & Tautavel
- Website: http://www.univ-perp.fr/

The University of Perpignan (French: Université de Perpignan; Catalan: Universitat de Perpinyà Via Domícia) is a French university, located in Perpignan.

== History ==
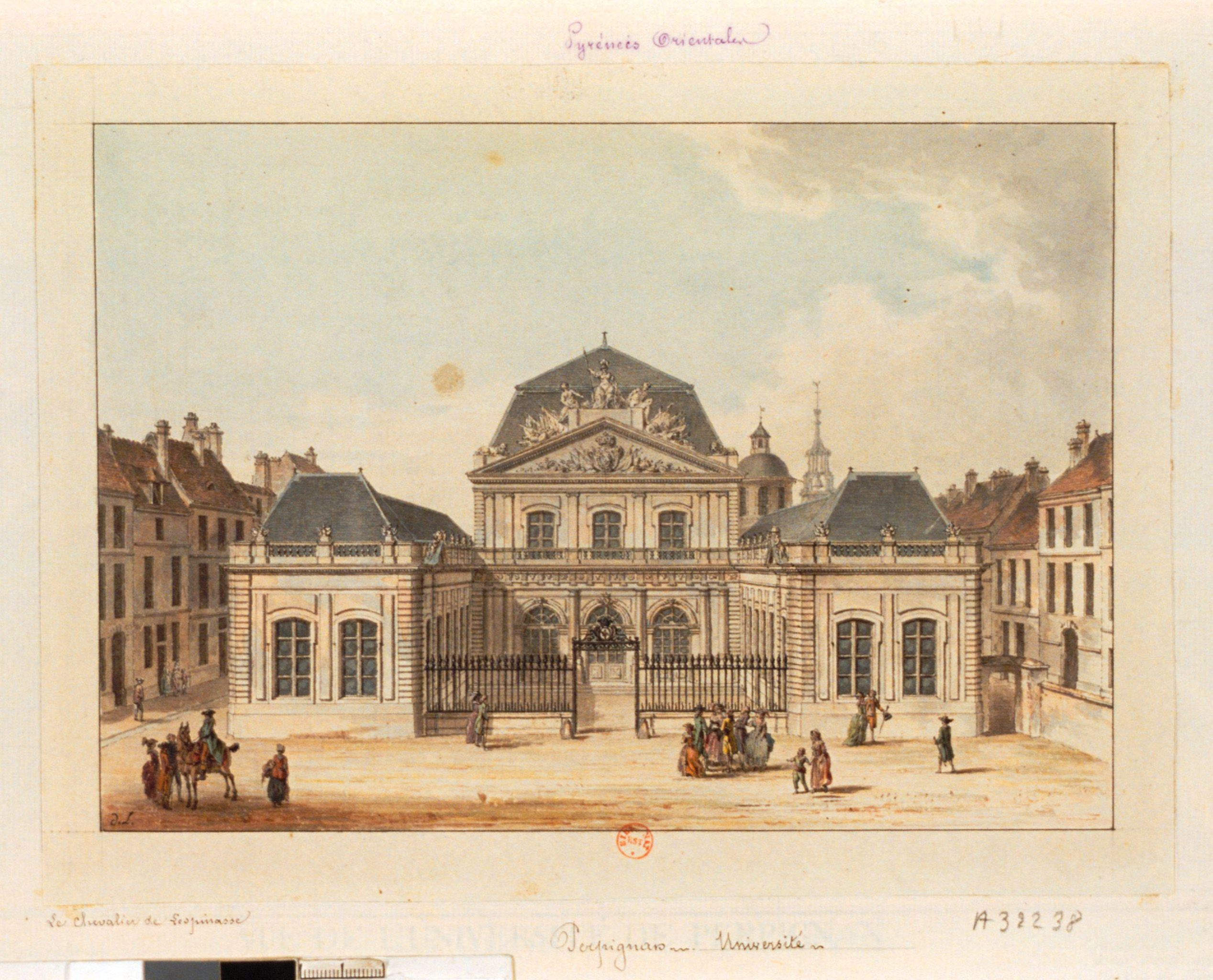
The University of Perpignan in 1780

The first university of Perpignan was established in 1349 by King Peter IV of Aragon. It is one of the oldest regional universities, following in the steps of more renowned centers of learning, such as the far more influential University of Toulouse and University of Montpellier.

Peter IV, having conquered in 1344 the town of Perpignan and reunited to his estates the Kingdom of Majorca, of which Perpignan became its capital, compensated that city for its loss of power by founding, at the request of the magistrates, 20 March 1349, the University of Perpignan, for the teaching of civil and canon law, and other arts and sciences. In the charter he praised "the deep learning of the professors of Perpignan".

By the Bull of 28 November 1379, the antipope Clement VII confirmed the foundation and privileges, and the university, in a petition addressed to him in 1393, declared him its founder: "Pater et Genitor". In 1381 John I of Aragon, son of Peter IV, granted permission to the city authorities to build the university near the royal castle. The institution spread in Perpignan an atmosphere of learning, the study of law being specially developed. Theology was taught there during the first years of the fourteenth century, but it was not until 21 July 1447, that the faculty of theology was created by a Bull of Pope Nicholas V and it did not receive its statutes until 1459.

The university of Perpignan was closed for two centuries between 1794 and 1971. A new University Center was established in Perpignan and in 1979 the University became autonomous financially, administratively and educationally.

== Organisation ==
The university is composed of four Faculties:

- Faculty of Pure and Experimental Science
- Faculty of Law and Economics
- Faculty of Letters and Human Sciences
- Faculty of Sports and Physical Activities

and three institutes:

- University Institute of Technology
- Institute of Business Administration
- Institute of Franco-Catalan Studies

== Notable people ==
=== Faculty ===
- Claude Combes (born 1935, in Perpignan) - biologist and parasitologist
- Jean Meyer (born 1942, in Nice) - historian
- Jean-Marcel Goger (born 1954 in Nancy, France) - historian
- Jacqueline Assaël (born 1957, Marseille) - Hellenist, essayist and poet
- Frederic Monneyron - professor of comparative and general literature
- Christophe Euzet (born 1967) - politician LREM
- Pere Aragonès (born 1982) - Catalan lawyer and politician; President of the Government of Catalonia

=== Alumni ===
- Lídia Armengol i Vila (1948 – 1991) - historian and civil servant Andorra
- Jeannie Mah (born 1952, in Regina, Saskatchewan) - Canadian ceramic artist
- Chadi Massaad (born 1959, in Lebanon) - architect
- Chafik Rachadi (born 1963, in Marrakech, Morocco) - politician.
- Asmaa Rhlalou - Moroccan journalist and politician
- Nicolas Lebourg (born 1979) - historian
- Nsah Mala (born 1988), writer and poet Cameroon

=== Recipient of honorary degree ===
- Predrag Matvejević (1932 – 2017) - Bosnian and Croatian writer and scholar

== See also ==
- List of medieval universities
- List of public universities in France by academy

== Notes ==
Attribution

Herbermann, Charles, ed. (1913). "Diocese of Perpignan" . Catholic Encyclopedia. New York: Robert Appleton Company.
