= Aída Pippo =

Argentine visual artist

Aída Rosa Pippo (born 1971 in Buenos Aires) is an Argentine visual artist.

== Career ==
Pippo studied at the Escuela Nacional de Bellas Artes Manuel Belgrano, as well as Anthropology at the University of Buenos Aires. Later on she got her degree at the Escuela Superior Prilidiano Pueyrredón. She develops her activities as painter, sculptor, illustrator, cryptoartist and researcher of new technologies applied to art and their dissemination. She develops her artistic work with physical and digital techniques. Together with Germán Katz she created the art duo @PippoKatz, devoted to multimedia art. They create blockchain-certified crypto artworks (NFTs) on marketplaces such as Raretoshi, Carnaval, and Opensea. Since 2021, she has organized the PremioB·Arte award for the NGO Bitcoin Argentina and Labitconf, taking part as a jury member.

She is also a member of the collective Mujeres en Blockchain, covering civil rights and cryptography, reviewing the place of women in the development of Web3 and exposing networks that connect women in technology, NFTs, and feminism.

== Selected exhibitions ==
Pippo has presented her works in several exhibitions, among others:

- 2000, 2001 and 2023: individual exhibitions at "Malas Artes", Buenos Aires.
- 2006: individual exhibition at "El ángel", Costa del Este.
- 2012 and 2013: individual exhibition at "Espacio Andahazi", Buenos Aires.
- 2013: Red Arte during "La noche de los Museos", Buenos Aires.
- 2014: Red Arte at the Buenos Aires City Legislature.
- 2014: collective exhibition at Pasaje Lanín, Buenos Aires.
- 2014: Centro Cultural Castelli, Muestra BelgranoaRte III, Buenos Aires.
- 2017: Fundación Leer, Desafío 20-20, Buenos Aires.
- 2018: individual exhibition “Lemas, anhelos y otras exageraciones” at Sileo Gallery, Buenos Aires. Curator: Laura Garimberti.
- 2019: MAPA Feria de Arte at Galería Imaginario, Buenos Aires.
- 2019: Experiencia Naranja “Hotel Anselmo”, Buenos Aires.
- 2020: collective exhibition at EspacioBitcoin, Buenos Aires.
- 2021: Anselmo Opening 21, Buenos Aires.
- 2022: collective exhibition “Preciados elementos”, Vicente López. Curator: Blendlatino.
- 2022: Bitcoin Genesis Drop de Carnaval NFT Art at Bitcoin Miami Conference 2022 (Art-Duo PippoKatz), Miami.
- 2022: collective exhibition of NFT Art from the book Cryptoart & Cryptoculture by Aaron Koenig (Art-Duo PippoKatz), Tulum, Mexico.
- 2024: exhibition of NFT Art (Art-Duo PippoKatz), New York.

== Personal life ==
Pippo is married to novelist Federico Andahazi since 1998; they have two children, Vera and Blas.
