= Bo, Aller =

Bo Boo
- Parish
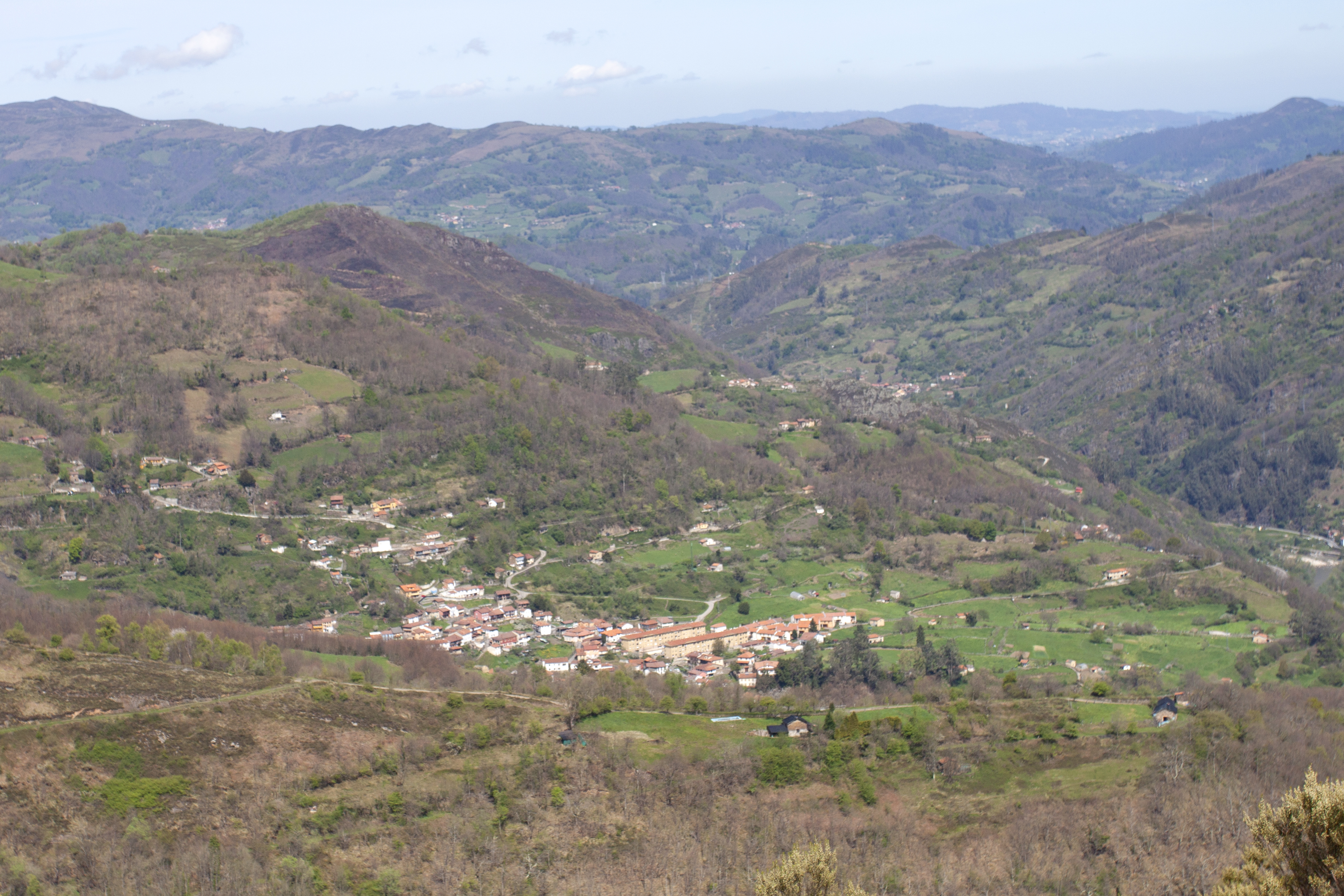

- Location within Spain
- Coordinates: 43.17101°N 5.76424°W
- Country: Spain
- Autonomous community: Asturias
- Province: Asturias
- Municipality: Aller

Area
  - Total: 6.9 km^{2} (2.7 sq mi)

Population (2024)
  - Total: 359
  - Density: 52/km^{2} (130/sq mi)
- Time zone: UTC+1 (CET)
  - Summer (DST): UTC+2 (CEST)

Bo (Spanish: Boo) is one of 18 parishes (administrative division) in Aller, a municipality within the province and autonomous community of Asturias, in northern Spain.

The altitude is between 420 m (1,380 ft) and 480 m (1,570 ft) above sea level. It is 6.9 km^{2} (2.7 sq mi) in size with a population of 359 as of January 1, 2024.

== Villages and hamlets ==
- Bo
- Bustiyé
- El Caliyu
- La Cotá
- Carrerayana
- Pando
- La Pena
- La Pruvía
- Rotella
- La Terrona
- Viaonga
- Love
