= Medal of Asturias =

- Sponsored by: Government of Asturias
- Country: Spain
- First award: 1986

The Medal of the Principality of Asturias (Spanish: Medalla del Principado de Asturias) is a Spanish civil decoration, the highest distinction awarded by the autonomous community of Asturias. Its purpose is to reward merits considered truly unique, carried out by both individuals and entities recognized for having provided services or activities of various nature for the benefit of the general interests of the Principality of Asturias. It is described in Law 4/1986, of 15 May, regulating honors and distinctions, published in the Boletín Oficial del Principado de Asturias number 125 on 30 May 1986. This rule replaced the regulations for the granting of honors and distinctions of the former Provincial Council of Asturias, of 29 October 1970. The medal has two different categories: gold and silver.

The Medal of Asturias has an honorary character, since it does not confer any economic benefit. It cannot be given to the president or deputies of the General Junta of the Principality, members of the Council of Government, or any other senior official of the Asturian administration while they are in office. It can be granted posthumously, as long as no more than two years have elapsed since the death of the candidate. Its concession is limited to an annual maximum of two gold medals and six silver medals, not counting those presented for reasons of courtesy or reciprocity to Spanish authorities or those of other countries. It is mandatory to prepare a report or file, in advance, in which the merits that justify the appointment are affirmed. The medal is awarded by means of an agreement issued by the Council of Government, and must be published in the Boletín Oficial. It is solemnly presented during the celebrations of Asturias Day on 8 September, the feast of Our Lady of Covadonga, the community's patron saint.

The decoration consists of a circular gold or silver medal with a diameter of seven centimeters and a thickness of four millimeters. On its obverse, the coat of arms of Asturias is engraved in relief, accompanied by the inscription Principado de Asturias. The name of the awardee is written on the back.

== Gold medal recipients ==
- 1986: Felipe VI, prince of Asturias
- 1987: Basque rescue team that attended to victims in the Picos de Europa
- 1990: Severo Ochoa
- 1991: Sabino Fernández Campo
- 1995: Asturias company of the Galicia Tactical Group of the Spanish Army
- 1995: Francisco Grande Covián
- 1998: Princess of Asturias Foundation
- 1999: Ángel González Muñiz
- 2001: Carlos Bousoño
- 2002: Juan Cueto
- 2002: Workers of the Cimadevilla Tobacco Factory
- 2003: Emilio Barbón Martínez (posthumous)
- 2004: Victims of the Madrid train bombings
- 2005: Graciano García García
- 2006: Fernando Morán
- 2008: University of Oviedo
- 2010: José María Martínez Cachero (posthumous)
- 2011: Rafael Fernández Álvarez (posthumous)
- 2011: Alberto Aza
- 2012: Sergio Marqués Fernández (posthumous)
- 2014: Ángel García Rodríguez
- 2015: Masaveu Corporation
- 2016: José Manuel Vaquero Tresguerres
- 2017: Plácido Arango Arias
- 2018: Asturian Centennial Centers
- 2018: Discoverers of the Tito Bustillo Cave – Ruperto Álvarez Romero, Eloisa Fernández Bustillo, Jesús Manuel Fernández Malvárez, Pilar González Salas, Adolfo Inda Sanjuán, Amparo Izquierdo Vallina, María Pía Posada Miranda, Elías Pedro Ramos Cabrero, Celestino Fernández Bustillo (posthumous), and Fernando López Marcos (posthumous)
- 2019: Vicente Álvarez Areces (posthumous)
- 2019: Central Mining Rescue Brigade

== See also ==
- Orders, decorations, and medals of Spain
- Princess of Asturias Awards
