= Amigos de Covadonga =

Amigos de Covadonga is a non-profit civil association, created in Asturias (Spain). It was created with the purpose of spreading and promoting devotion to the Virgin of Covadonga.

== History ==
Although there was a first Association that ceased to have activity, the current one was legally constituted on February 24, 2018.

In 2018 several commemorative events were celebrated in Covadonga in 2018: the centenary of the canonical coronation of the Santina; the creation of the national park of the Picos de Europa; and the one thousand three hundred years of the origin of the Kingdom of Asturias. For these reasons, the association Amigos de Covadonga joined these commemorations by making the sanctuary of Covadonga available to visitors. A team of volunteers who make up the Pilgrims' Reception Service (SAP) conduct guided tours. These tours are currently available in Spanish, French and Arabic.

On May 19, 2018, the First General Assembly was held in the sanctuary of Covadonga itself, to promote and spread devotion to the Virgin of Covadonga. The aims of the association were recalled: the return to the Christian roots of Europe, the defense of life (from the first moment of its conception to its natural end), the family and youth, along with the collaboration with the Sanctuary in different tasks: volunteering in welcoming pilgrims, cleaning, conservation and maintenance of facilities, and dissemination of its activities, among others.

The Association has two thousand five hundred members,3 of which a significant number reside in other Spanish autonomous communities and in Latin America.

== See also ==
- Covadonga
