= Arab Labor Organization =

Arab-membership workers' representative body

- Abbreviation: ALO
- Formation: January 12, 1965; 61 years ago
- Type: NGO, Non-Profit
- Headquarters: Giza, Egypt
- Region served: Arab World
- Members: 21 states
- Official language: Arabic
- Secretary General: H.E. Fayez Almutairi
- Parent organization: League of Arab States
- Website: alolabor.org

The Arab Labor Organization (ALO) is the first Specialized Arab Organization concerned with labor affairs and employment issues on National Level. It was established in 12/01/1965, as one of the specialized organizations affiliated with the League of Arab States. ALO is believing in the importance of concerted tripartite in the Arab world, as a need and a core pillar for Arab unity and the recognition that cooperation in the field of employment is the best guarantee for the Arab human rights in decent life, founded on social justice, and the process of effective cooperation for developing Arab society on solid and sound foundations, therefore ALO has a unique tripartite structure in the Arab world gives an opportunity to (workers, employers and governments of 21 Arab countries) to freely debate, elaborate and shape labor standards, policies and programs.

== History ==
On the 12th of January 1965, the first Conference of Arab Ministers of Labor, held in Baghdad, approved the Arab Labor Charter and the draft Constitution of the Arab Labor Organization. On the 8th of January 1970, the fifth Conference of Arab Labor Ministers, in Cairo, decided to announce the establishment of the Arab Labor Organization after the completion of the necessary number of ratifications of Member States on the Arab Labor Charter and the Constitution of the Organization. The resolution to declare the organization was in response to the national trend, looking forward to achieve unity in various fields.

== Membership ==
ALO has 21 Arab State Members:

#	Country	Join Date
1	Jordan	1969
2	UAE	1972
3	Bahrain	1977
4	Tunisia	1973
5	Algeria	1971
6	Djibouti	1978
7	KSA	1976
8	Sudan	1966
9	Syria	1965
10	Somalia	1974
11	Iraq	1965
12	Oman	1983
13	Palestine	1972
14	Qatar	1972
15	Kuwait	1968
16	Lebanon	1971
17	Libya	1970
18	Egypt	1966
19	Morocco	1973
20	Mauritania	1974
21	Yemen	1968

== Objectives ==
Arab Labor Organization aims to achieve the following :

- Coordinating efforts in work and workers fields at the Arab and international levels.
- Developing and maintaining the trade union rights and freedom of association.
- Providing technical assistance in all fields of labor to the tripartite in the Member States.
- Developing labor legislation in the Member States and working on standardization.
- Improving work conditions in the Member States.
- Developing Arab human resources to take advantage of its full capacities in economic and social development.
- Developing the Arab workforce and raising productivity efficiency.
- Preparing a guide, and laying the foundations for occupational classification and characterization.
- Translating, into Arabic, the labor and vocational training terms.

== Arab Labor standards ==
Since 1966, Arab Labor Organization has maintained and developed a system of Arab labor standards aimed at promoting opportunities for workers to obtain decent and productive work, in conditions of equity, security, dignity, safe and healthy. These standards have become a comprehensive system of instruments on work policy, designed to address most sorts of problems in their application at the national level. Arab labor standards are legal instruments drawn up by the ALO's constituents (governments, employers and workers) and setting out basic principles and rights at work. They are either conventions, which are legally binding the member states who ratified them, or recommendations, which serve as non-binding guidelines.

=== Conventions and Recommendations ===
ALO Issued (19) Conventions and (9) recommendations, which organized all aspects of the legal instruments relating to work, to ensure workers' rights and regulate the relationship between workers and employers, to define the responsibilities and duties of tripartite. By its Conventions and Recommendations, ALO is developing and promoting national labor legislation, to achieve symmetry between them, believing that national labor inspection is the proper way to guarantee the implementation of the legislation's provisions.

==== Conventions ====
Arabic version documents
#	Issue Year	About	Download
1	1966	Labor standards	Download
2	1967	Manpower mobility	Download
3	1971	Minimum standard of social insurance	Download
4	1975	Manpower mobility (revised)	Download
5	1976	Working women	Download
6	1976	Labor standards (revised)	Download
7	1977	Occupational Safety and Health	Download
8	1977	Freedom and right of Association	Download
9	1977	Vocational Guiding And training	Download
10	1979	Paid educational leave	Download
11	1979	Collective Bargaining	Download
12	1980	Agricultural workers	Download
13	1981	Working Environment	Download
14	1981	The right of the Arab worker in social insurance in case of mobility to work in another country	Download
15	1983	Fixing and protection of wages	Download
16	1983	Worker social services	Download
17	1993	Rehabilitation and employment of disabled persons	Download
18	1996	Work of Young Persons	Download
19	1998	Labor inspection	Download

==== Recommendations ====
Arabic version documents
#	Issue Year	About	Download
1	1977	Occupational Safety and Health	Download
2	1977	Vocational Guiding And training	Download
3	1979	Paid educational leave	Download
4	1980	Development and protection of the labor force in the agricultural sector	Download
5	1981	Working Environment	Download
6	1983	Worker social services	Download
7	1993	Rehabilitation and employment of disabled persons	Download
8	1998	Labor inspection	Download
9	2014	Social protection of workers in the informal sector	Download

== Constitutional bodies ==
=== 1- Arab Labor Conference (The General Conference) ===
It is the Supreme authority of the organization. ALO organizes once a year the Arab Labor Conference to set the broad policies of the ALO, including conventions and recommendations. The conference makes decisions about the ALO's general policy, work plan and budget and also elects the Board of Directors and Director General. Each Member State is represented by a delegation: two government delegates, an employer delegate, a worker delegate and their respective advisers. International and regional organizations, also attend but as observers.

=== 2- Board of Directors ===
ALO has a tripartite governing structure that brings together governments, employers, and workers of 21 member States. The very structure of ALO, where workers and employers together have an equal voice with governments in its deliberations, ensures that the views of the social partners are closely reflected in ALO labor standards, policies and plans. It meets twice a year, in March and October. It takes decisions on the agenda of the Arab Labor Conference, adopts the draft Plan and Budget of the Organization for submission to the Arab labor Conference, and supervises the work of ALO.

This Board of Directors is composed of 8 titular members (4 Governments, 2 Employers and 2 Workers) and 3 deputy members (one represents each group).

The Government, Employers and Workers seats are elected by the General Conference every two years (the last elections were held in April 2018).

=== 3- Arab Labor Office ===
The Arab Labor Office is the permanent secretariat of the Arab Labor Organization. It is located in Cairo – Egypt, the headquarters state, according to the constitution. It is headed by the Director General, one of whose responsibilities is to implement the resolutions of the General Conference and the board of directors.

== Affiliates ==
1. Arab Institute for Workers Education & Labor Researches in Algeria
2. Arab Center for Social Insurance in Sudan
3. Arab Institute for Occupational Health & Safety in Syria
4. Arab Center for Human Resource Development in Libya
5. Arab Center for Labor Administration & Employment in Tunisia
6. ALO Permanent Mission in Geneva

== Director General ==
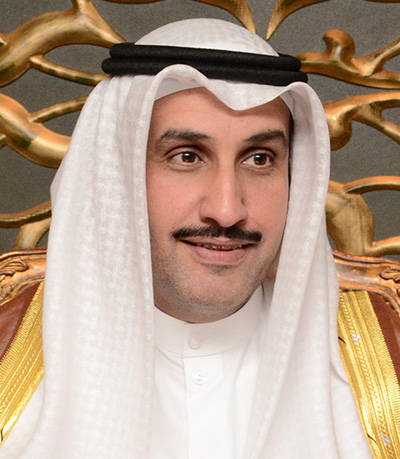

H.E. FAYEZ ALMUTAIRI

Nationality: Kuwait

He was elected as Director-General of ALO in April 2015 for four years and re-elected as Director-General for a second four year-term in April 2019, and for a third four years-term in Mars 2023.

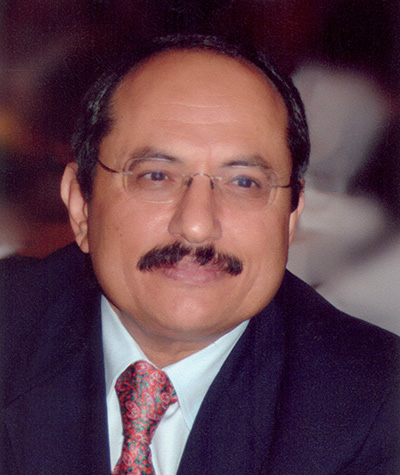

H.E. AHMED LUQMAN

Nationality: Yemen

He was elected as Director-General of ALO in 2007 for four years and re-elected for a second four year-term in 2011.

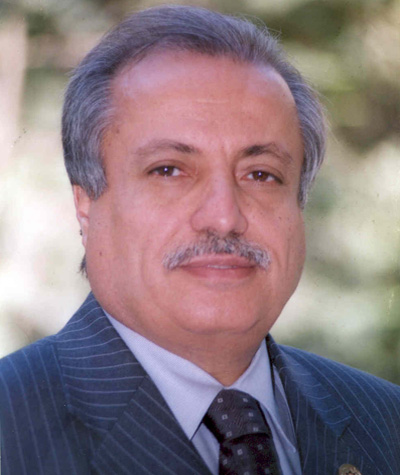

H.E. DR. IBRAHIM QWEIDER

Nationality: Libya

He was elected as Director-General of ALO in 1999 for four years and re-elected for a second four year-term in 2003.

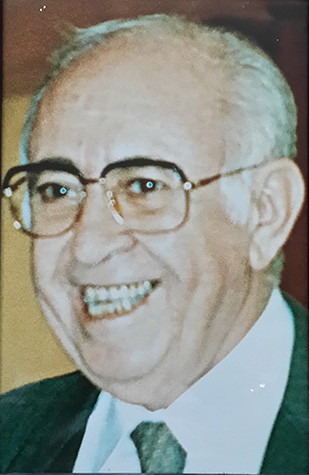

H.E. BAKR RASOOL

Nationality: Iraq

He was elected as Director-General of ALO in 1990 for five years and re-elected for a second five year-term in 1995. Due to the amendment to paragraph 4 of Article 6 of the ALO constitution, his term was ended in 1999.

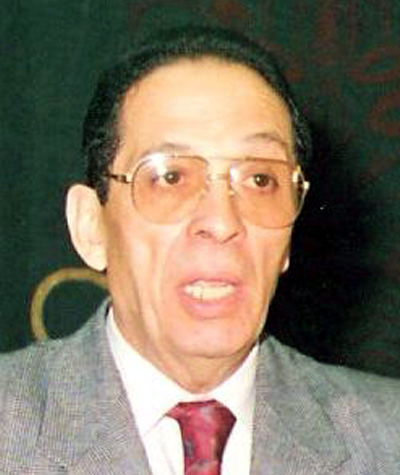

H.E. AL-HASHEMI AL-BANANI

Nationality: Morocco

He was elected as Director-General of ALO in 1980 for five years and re-elected for a second five year-term in 1985.

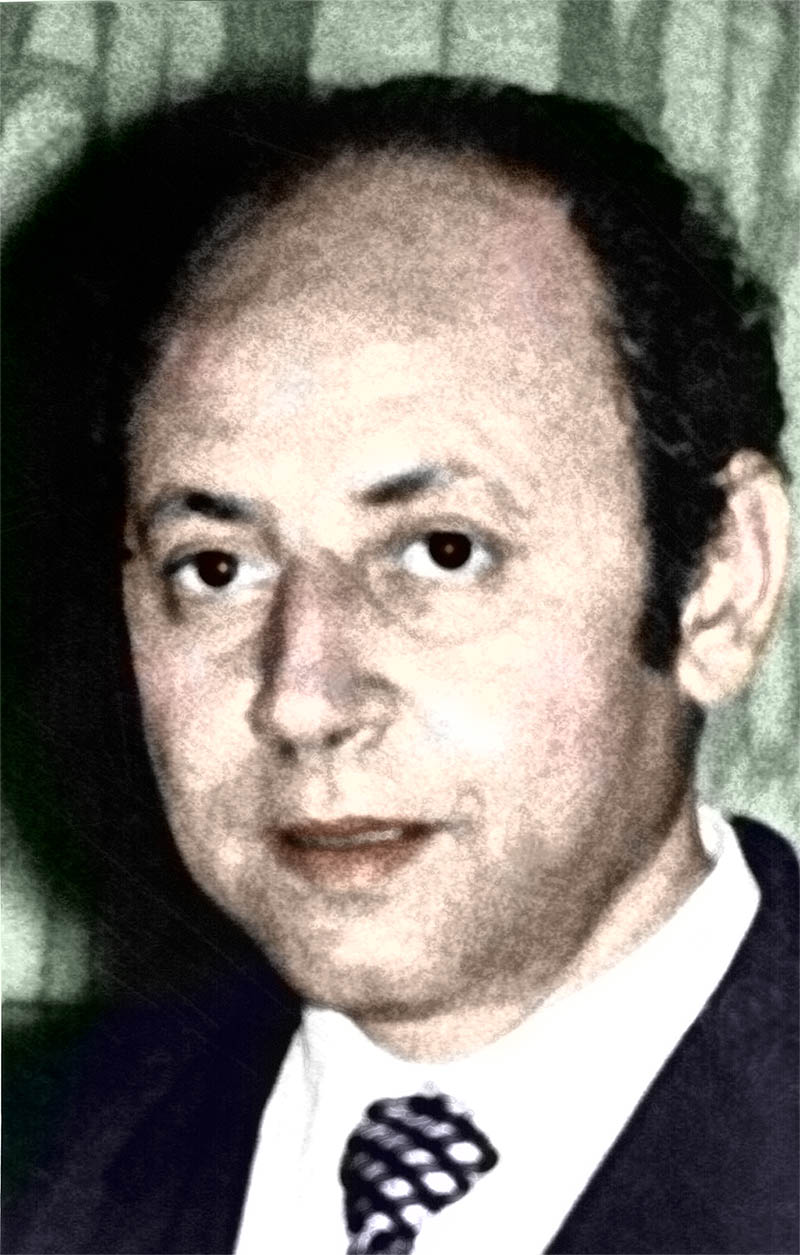

H.E. TAYEB AL-HOUDAIRY

Nationality: Algeria

He was elected as the first Director-General of ALO in 1972 for five years and re-elected for a second five year-term in 1977, but he resigned in 1980.
