= Our Lady of Covadonga =

Title of the Virgin Mary

Coordinates: 43.308913°N 5.054043°W

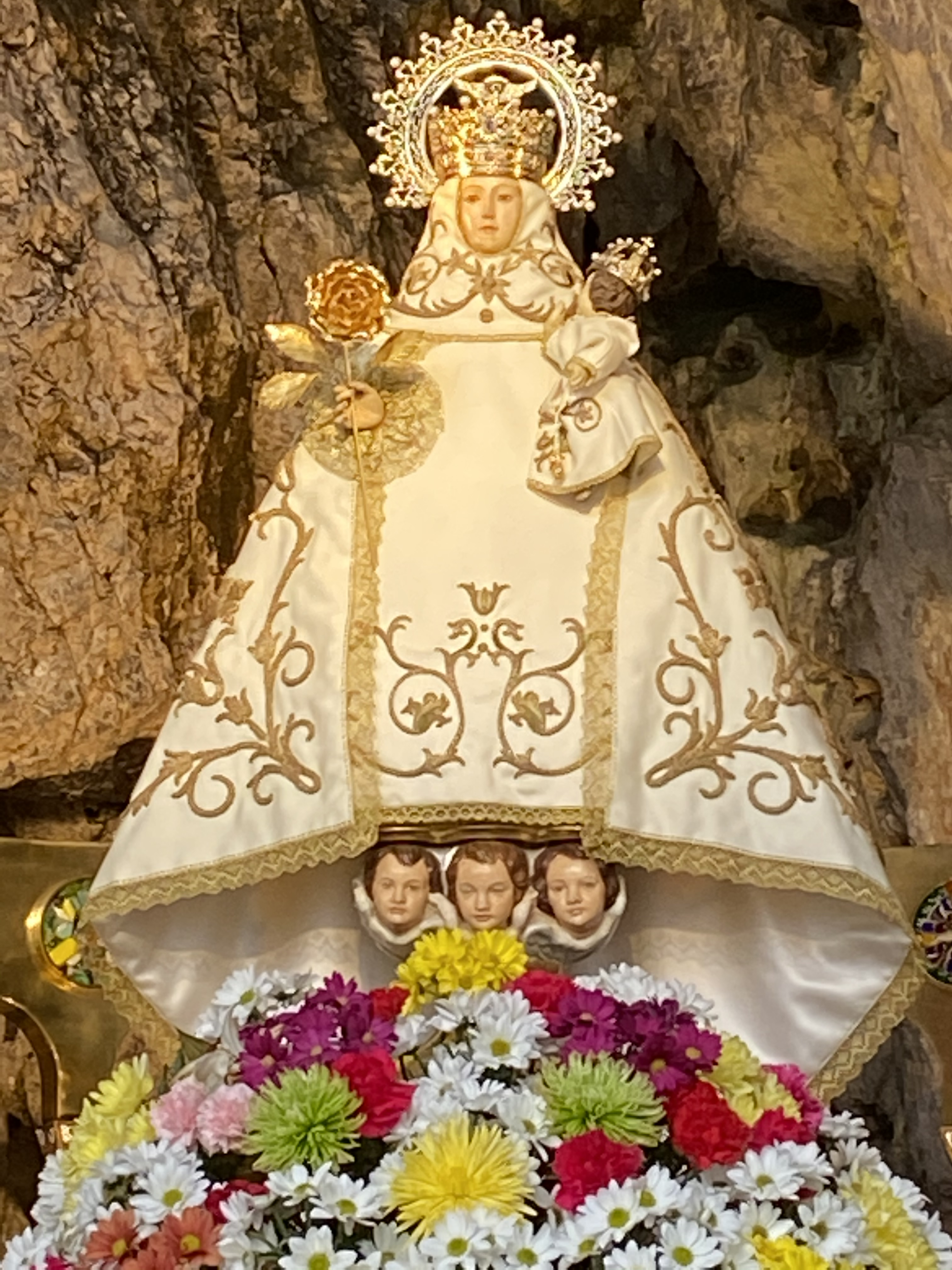

Our Lady of Covadonga (Asturian: Virxe de Cuadonga) also named "La Santina" is a title of the Blessed Virgin Mary and the name of a Marian shrine devoted to her at Covadonga, Asturias. The shrine in northwestern Spain rose to prominence following the Battle of Covadonga in about 720, which was the first defeat of the Moors during their invasion of Spain. The Blessed Virgin Mary, whose statue was hidden in one of the caves, was believed to have miraculously aided the Christian victory.

Our Lady of Covadonga is the co-patron of Asturias, and a basilica was built to house the current statue. Her feast day is 8 September, as it is also the autonomic day of Asturias. In the Orthodox Church in America, her feast day is held on 8 April.

== History ==
Covadonga is a mountainous region in the province of Asturias in the extreme north west of Spain. Following the Islamic Arab invasion of Spain in 711, Roderic, the Christian Visigoth King of Spain was defeated and killed at the Battle of Guadalete. The battle was decisive and led to the swift conquest of most of Visigothic Spain.

The remnant of the Visigoth nobility retreated to the remote mountains of northern Spain. According to texts written in northern Iberia during the ninth century, they elected in 718 a man named Pelayo, or Pelagius, as their leader. Pelayo's father had been a dignitary at the court of the Visigoth King Egica. Pelayo gathered a band of warriors to resist Islamic encroachment. When in 722 the Arab commander of Spain sent an army to eliminate this resistance, the Christian army made its stand at a place of many caves known as Covadonga.

According to tradition Pelayo retreated to a cave where a hermit had secreted a statue of the Virgin Mary, saved from the Muslim conquest. He prayed to the virgin for victory. In the subsequent battle the Christians made use of the natural defences. The moorish commander fell in the battle, and his soldiers fled. This victory, considered the first of the Christian reconquista of Spain, established the independence of the Kingdom of Asturias in north west Spain.

=== The Shrine ===
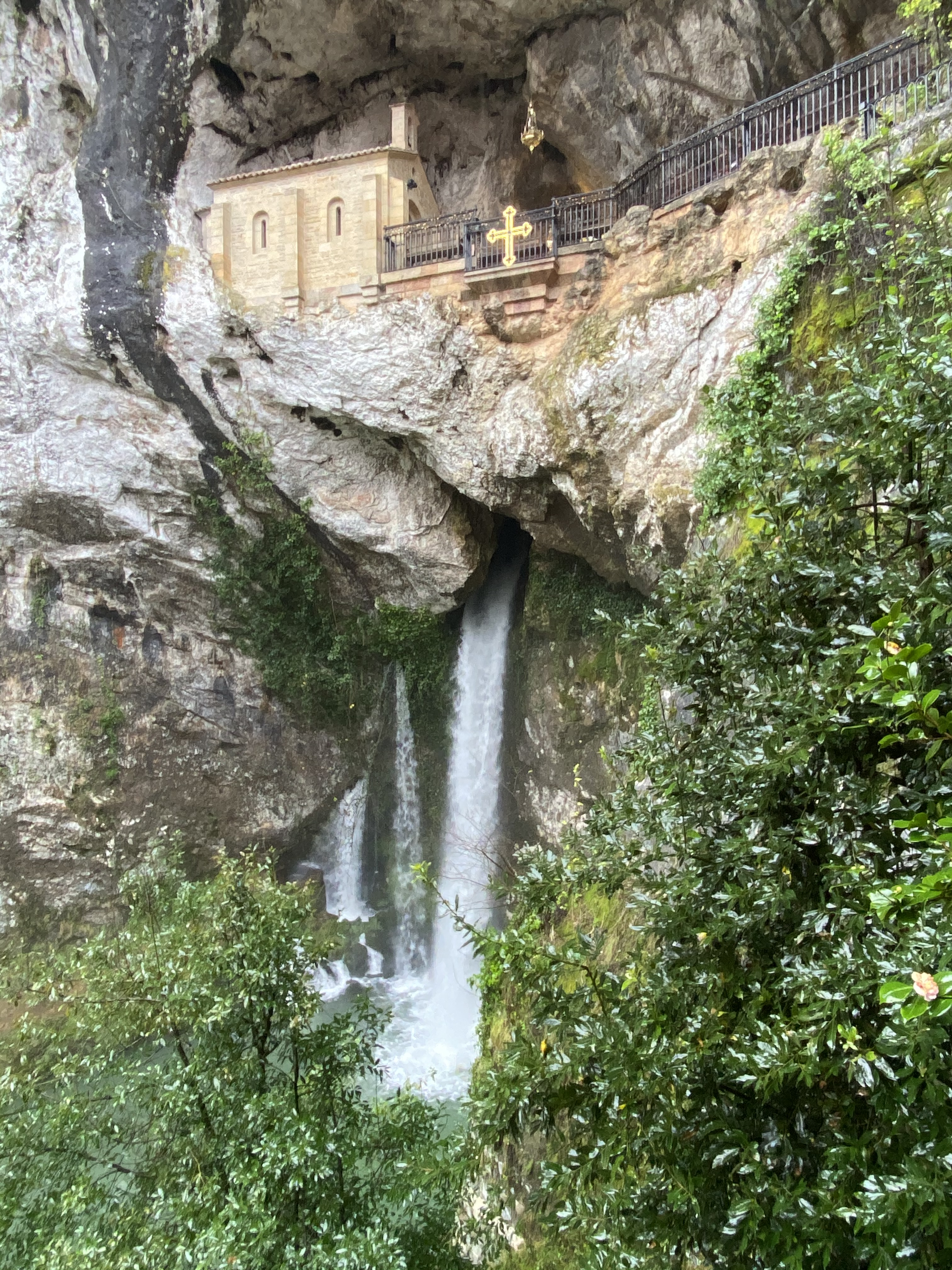
The Holy Cave, place where, according to legend, Our Lady of Covadonga appeared to Pelayo

Pelayo credited the intercession of the Virgin Mary for his victory. And in recognition of this miraculous intercession, King Alfonso I, the Catholic (739-757) commanded that a monastery and chapel be built on the site in honor of Our Lady of Covadonga.

The sanctuary came to be run by Augustinian canons but was destroyed by fire on 17 October 1777. The shrine was rebuilt piecemeal, until replaced by a great Basilica that was consecrated in 1901. The basilica houses the current statue of Our Lady of Covadonga, dating to the 16th century. Pope John Paul II visited the shrine during his papacy.

Amigos de Covadonga is a non-profit civil association which began in 2018 to spread the word and promote devotion to the Virgin of Covadonga.

== Sources ==
- https://www.newadvent.org/cathen/11363a.htm Catholic Encyclopedia
