= Roberto Frassinelli =

German archaeologist, naturalist, bibliophile, and draftsman

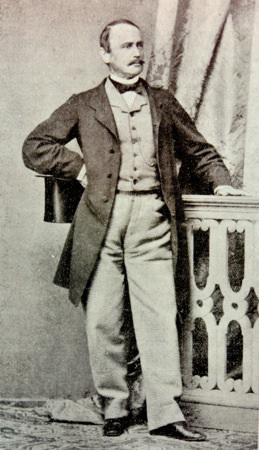

Roberto Frassinelli Burnitz (1811–1887) was a German archaeologist, naturalist, bibliophile, and draftsman.
