= Tusquets =

Tusquets is a surname and a given name. Notable people with the name include:

- Ramón Tusquets y Maignon (1837–1904), Italian-Spanish painter
- Juan Tusquets Terrats (1901–1998), Spanish priest, author of Orígenes de la revolución española
- Esther Tusquets (1936–2012), Spanish publisher, novelist and essayist
- Òscar Tusquets, (born 1941), Spanish architect

== See also ==
- Premio Tusquets de Novela, literary prize for writers in the Spanish language
