= Autovía AS-II =

Motorway in Spain

Autovía AS-II
- Autovía Industrial

Route information
- Length: 24 km (15 mi)
- Existed: 2007–present

Major junctions
- From: Oviedo
- To: Gijón

Location
- Country: Spain

Highway system
- Highways in Spain; Autopistas and autovías; National Roads

The AS-II is a highway in Asturias, Spain that connects Oviedo and Gijón. It is also known as Autovía Industrial because of its travel through several industrial parks like Porceyo or Llanera.

It starts in the neighbourhood of Pumarín in Oviedo and finishes in the parish of Porceyo in Gijón, where it connects with the Avenida de la Constitución in Gijón.

The AS-II was built by the Government of the Principality of Asturias and opened in 2007 as a splitting of the road AS-18, the old connection between the two biggest cities in Asturias.

The company Viastur operates the highway as a concession.

== Route ==
Km	Location	Link with
2	La Corredoria	
4	Lugones	
5	Silvota Industrial park	AS-17
18	Cenero	AS-18
20	Porceyo	
24	Gijón	A-8
