= Campo Valdés Roman baths =

Roman baths in Gijón, Spain

- Termas romanas de Campo Valdés (Spanish)
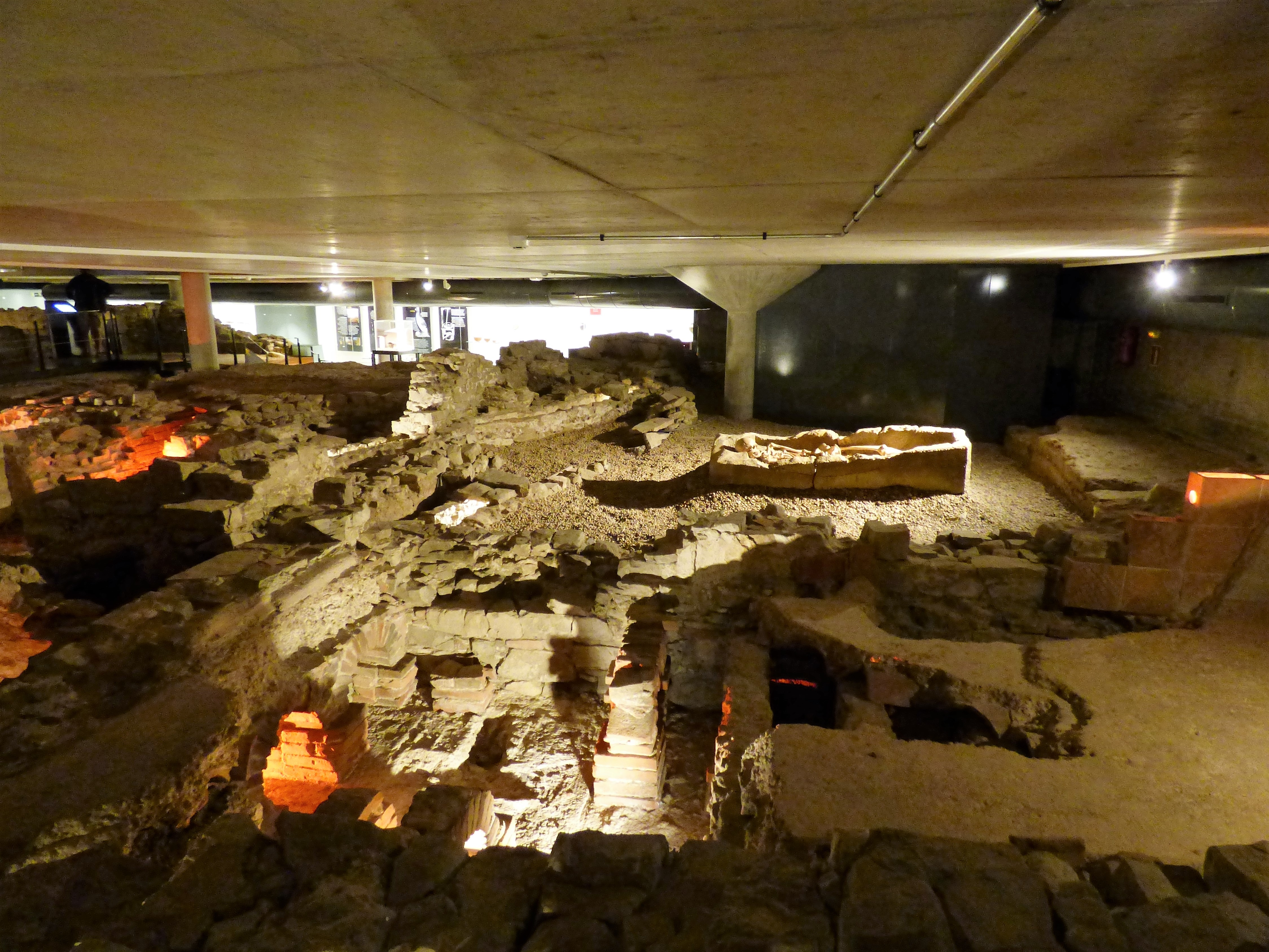
- Interior of the site
- Interactive map of Campo Valdés Roman baths
- 43°32′44″N 5°39′40″W
- Location: Gijón, Asturias, Spain

History
- Built: 1st century A.D.

Site notes
- Visitors: 113,004 (in 2023)

Spanish Cultural Heritage

The Campo Valdés Roman baths were public baths constructed in Gijón, Spain, near the end of the first century. They fell out of use in the fourth century before being used as a necropolis and covered by a plaza. In 1903, the baths were rediscovered and excavated during the construction of a sewer system in the area. The site of the baths was turned into a museum, which opened in March 1995. The site was declared a Bien de Interés Cultural in 1987, and the museum was Gijón's most visited in 2023.

== History ==
The public baths were constructed in Cimadevilla near the end of the first century A.D. during the Roman occupation of the Iberian Peninsula. It used the hypocaust heating system and contained a sudatorium, apodyterium, frigidarium, tepidarium, and caldarium. The site gradually expanded until it fell out of use in the fourth century. In the Middle Ages, it was used as a necropolis, and in the 19th century, a plaza was constructed over the buried baths.

The then-forgotten baths were rediscovered during the construction of a sewer system in the area in March 1903. Locals Calixto Alvargonzález Landeau and Julio Somoza led the excavation efforts. Three years after the excavation, Alvargonzález wrote a detailed monograph describing at great length the uncovered structure, materials, and artifacts; the monograph was not published until 1965, 55 years after his death. In 1987, the baths were declared a Bien de Interés Cultural; three years later, a team led by archeologists Carmen Fernández Ochoa and Paloma García Díaz carried out further excavation and restoration on the site.

== Museum ==
Following the secondary excavations, the site of the baths was converted into an underground museum, which opened in March 1995. The museum is split into two sections, an "informative zone" and an "archeological zone." The archeological zone allows visitors to walk along a catwalk through the separate rooms of the old bathhouse. Artifacts found on the site, a sarcophagus, and placards and models detailing the baths' history are on display in the informative zone. In 2023, 113,004 people passed through the museum, making it Gijón's most visited museum that year.
