= Gijón =

City and municipality in Asturias, Spain

Gijón Xixón (Asturian)
- Municipality
- Gijón / Xixón
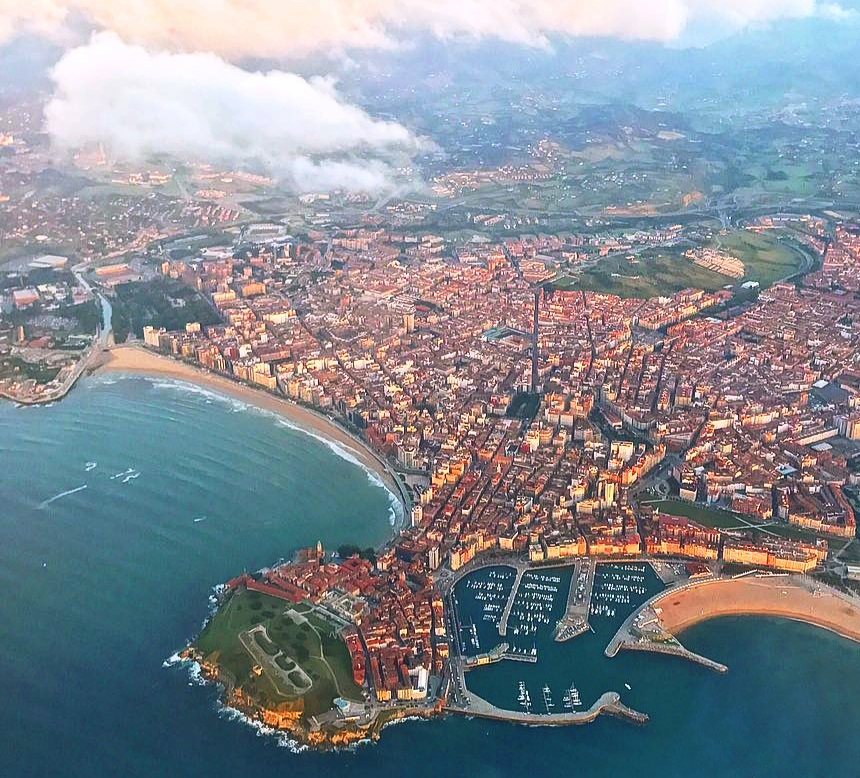
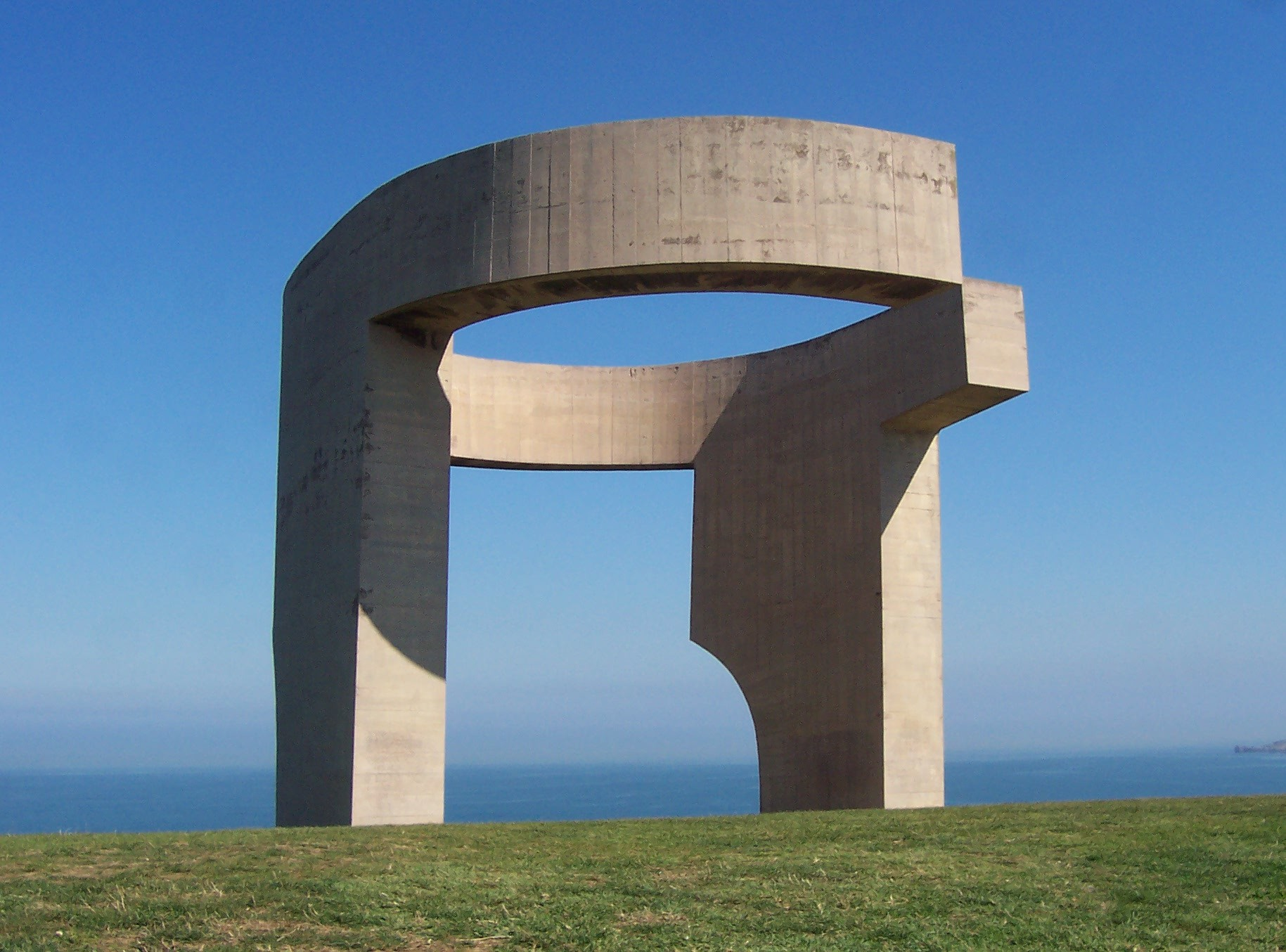
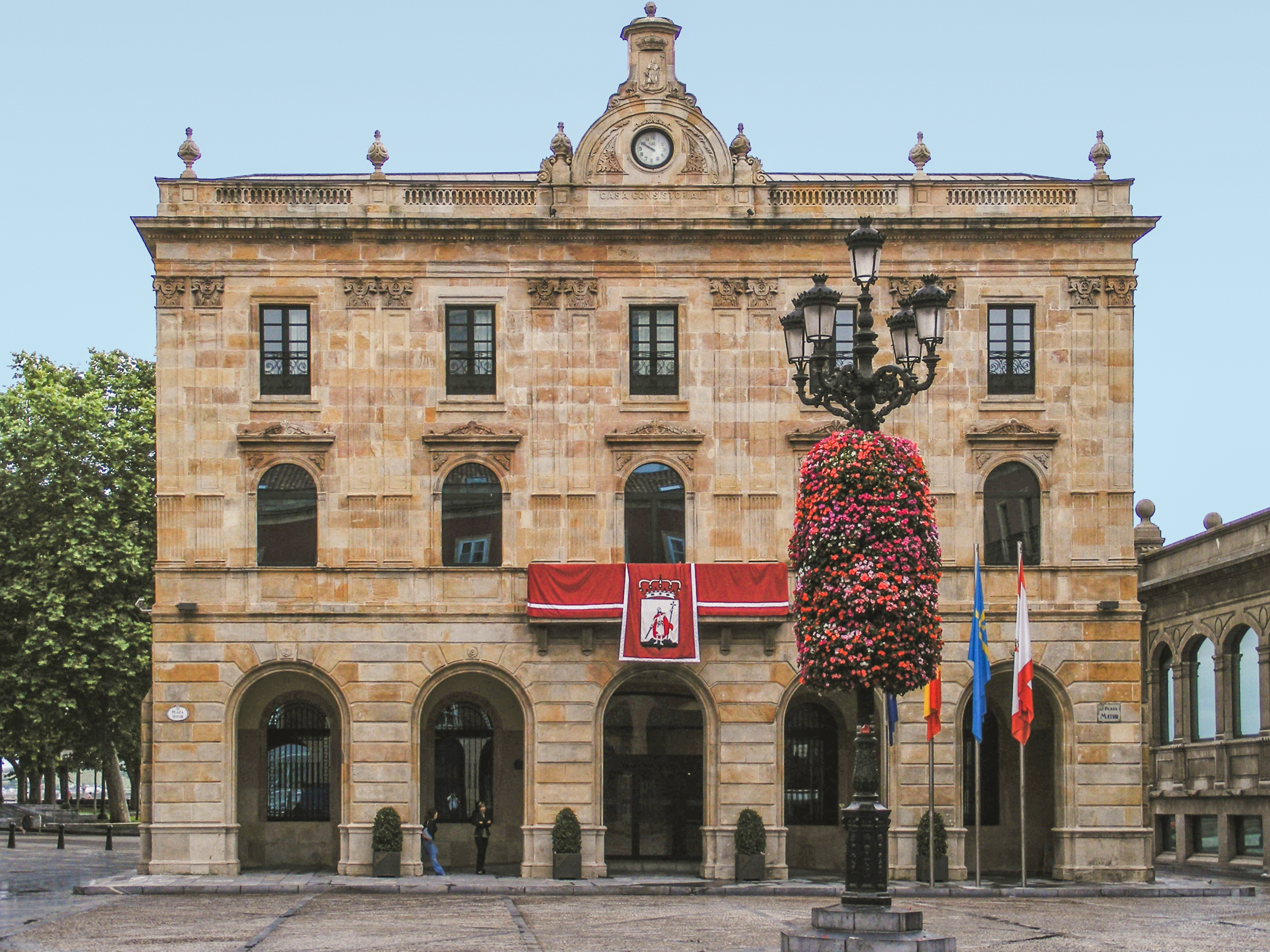
- Aerial view Jovellanos Theater Elogio del Horizonte City hall Panoramic view

- Flag Coat of arms
- Interactive map of Gijón
- Coordinates: 43°32′N 5°42′W
- Country: Spain
- Autonomous community: Asturias
- Founded: 5th century BC (Noega, the first settlement on record)

Government
  - Mayor: Carmen Moriyón (Foro)

Area
  - Municipality: 183.95 km^{2} (71.02 sq mi)
- Elevation: 3 m (9.8 ft)
- Highest elevation: 737 m (2,418 ft)
- Lowest elevation: 32 m (105 ft)

Population (2025)
  - Municipality: 271,259
  - Rank: 16th in Spain
  - Density: 1,474.6/km^{2} (3,819.3/sq mi)
  - Urban: 430,000
  - Metro: 860,000
  - Seat/Locality: 255,940
- Demonyms: gijonés, -esa (es) xixonés, -esa (ast)
- Time zone: UTC+1 (CET)
  - Summer (DST): UTC+2 (CEST)
- Postal code: 33201–33212
- Website: Official website

Gijón (Spanish: [xiˈxon]) or Xixón (Asturian: [ʃiˈʃoŋ]) is a city and municipality in northwestern Spain. It is the largest city and municipality by population in the autonomous community of Asturias. It is located on the coast of the Cantabrian Sea in the Bay of Biscay, in the central-northern part of Asturias; it is approximately 24 km (15 mi) northeast of Oviedo, the capital of Asturias, and 26 km (16 mi) from Avilés. With a population of 271,259 as of 2025, Gijón is the 16th-largest city in Spain.

Gijón forms part of a large metropolitan area that includes twenty councils in the center of the region, structured with a dense network of roads, highways and railways and with a population of 835,053 inhabitants in 2011, making it the 7th-largest in Spain.

During the 20th century, Gijón developed as an industrial city in the steel and naval industries. However, due to the decline in manufacturing in these industries, in recent years Gijón is undergoing a transformation into an important tourist, university, commercial and R&D center. Gijón is the location of the Radiotelevisión del Principado de Asturias, the neighbourhood of Cimavilla, the Universidad Laboral de Gijón, the Revillagigedo Palace, and the adjoining Collegiate Church of San Juan Bautista.

Gijón is part of the statistical (not yet developed from an administrative standpoint) comarca of Gijón.

== Etymology ==
One theory based on some early medieval texts mention it as "Gigia", derived from the identical Greek and Latin term "gigias", meaning "giant", both of which refer to the Greek mythological giant Gigas. The medieval "Gigia" name, in turn, more specifically would refer to the ancient Roman wall built on the peninsula of the Cimavilla neighbourhood of Gijón. This wall was called the "Gegionem" by the Romans, and is itself a compound Latin term being either "geg-ionem", meaning "giant-ness/gigantic", "gegi-onem", meaning "concrete giant", or "gegio-nem" meaning "giant end". Presumably the use of the term meaning "giant" referred to either the pre-Germanic Astur peoples who inhabited the area being of large physical stature, or simply the largeness of the wall itself.

The name of the city might also come from the hypothetical Roman actual name of the place "Sessio" which may have turned into the word "Xixón" as the centuries went by. Then the Spanish word "Gijón", which has been also written during the Middle age as "Jijón" or even "Jixón", would be a Castilianization of the Asturian name. This theory is nowadays known as the most acceptable.

== History ==
=== Prehistory and Romanization ===
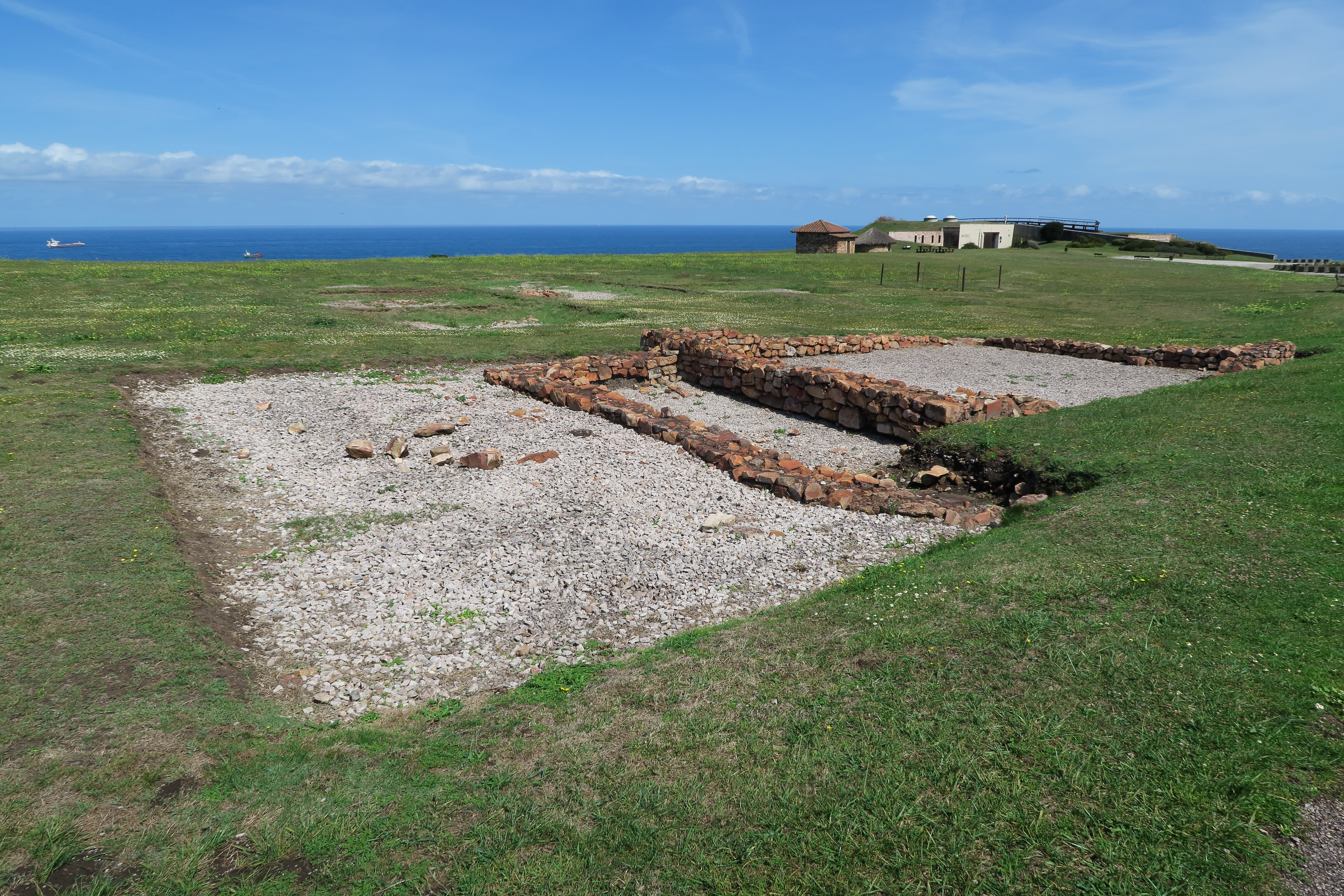
View of the archaeological site of Campa Torres

The first evidence of human presence in what is known nowadays as the municipality of Gijón is located on Monte Deva, where there exists a series of tumuli, and on Monte Areo, where there are some neolithic dolmens. These dolmens were discovered in 1990 and were supposedly built around 5000 BC.

The first noticed settlement (Noega) is located in Campa Torres. It has its origin between the 6th and 5th centuries BC. It was populated by Astures (Cilúrnigos) and later Romanized. Noega was progressively abandoned when the Roman wall in the peninsula of Cimavilla, called the Gegionem, was built.

=== Middle Ages and modern era ===
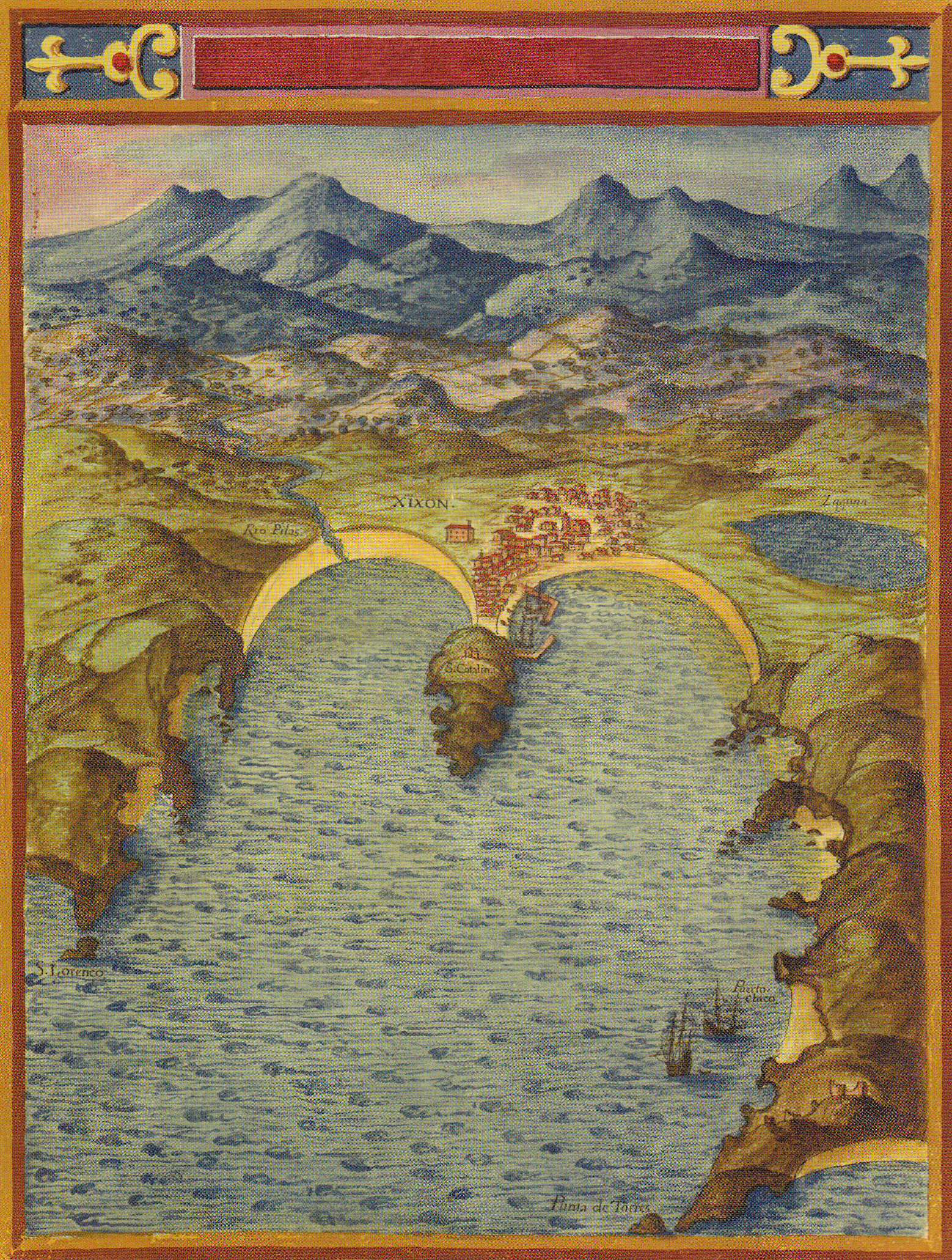
View of Gijón c. 1630

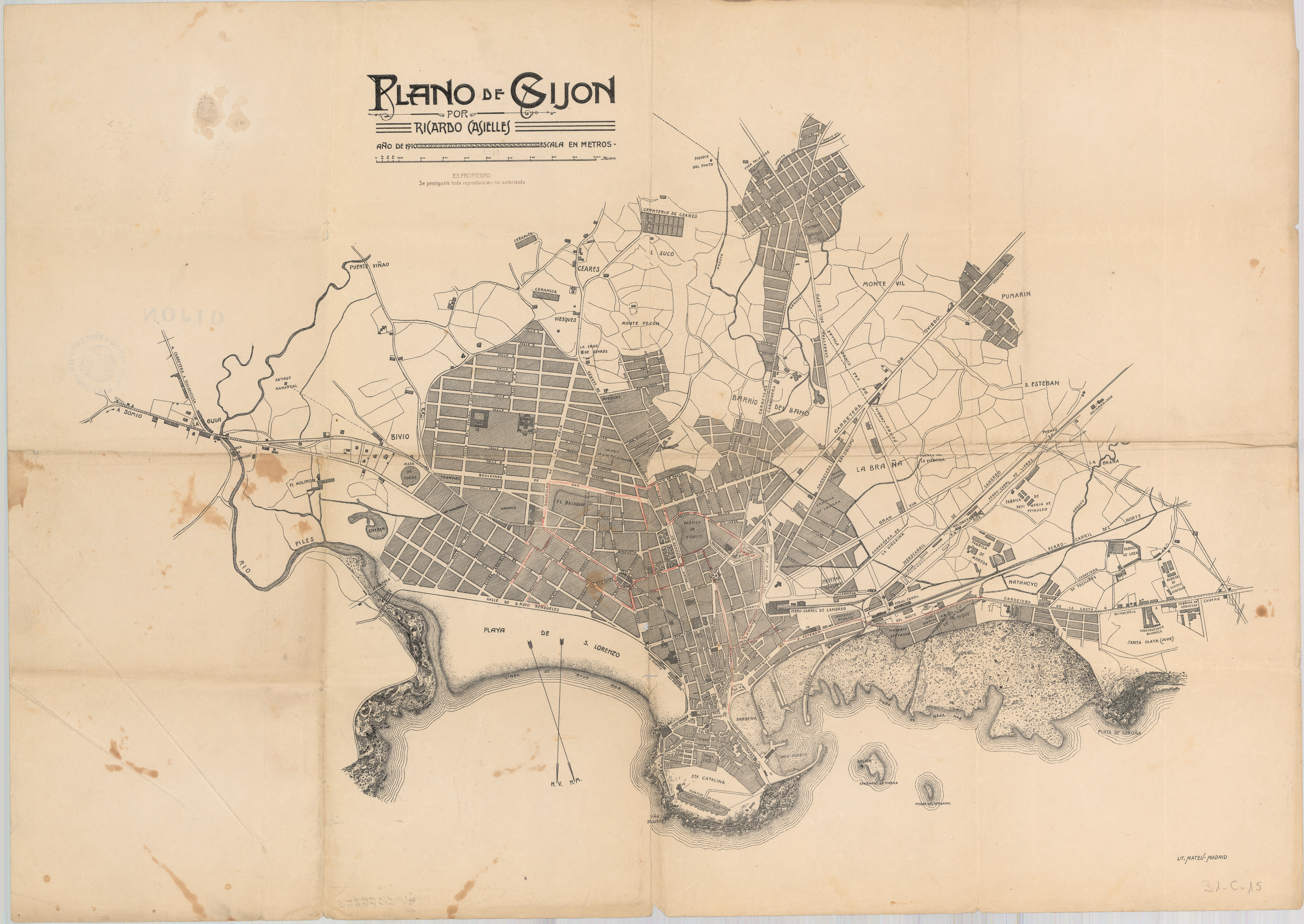
Map of Gijón in 1910

The invasions of barbarian tribes in the 5th and 6th centuries left no traces. The region submitted to the power of the Visigoth king Sisebut in the 7th century. This period marks the beginnings of Christianization, one of the first Christian worshipping places being the Roman villa of Veranes.

Gijón was capital of the Muslim territories on the Cantabric Sea, under the power of Munuza, for a short period between 713 and 718 or 722. In 722 the Asturians won the Battle of Covadonga which is regarded as the beginning of the Reconquista. The Asturian forces were led by Pelagius, who would become the first king of the Kingdom of Asturias.

Until 1270 there were no reliable references to Gijón as a settlement, with only short mentions in some documents. In this year, Alfonso X of Castile gave it the status of puebla. This documentation appears in the Monastery of San Vicente de Oviedo.

In the 14th century, the war between Alfonso Enríquez, Count of Gijón and Noreña and Henry III of Castile ended when the village of Gijón was burned and totally destroyed, practically disappearing. In the 15th and 16th centuries, Gijón reemerged. A new dock was built in the port adding fishing and commerce to the area. In the 17th and 18th centuries Gijón began to develop rapidly, growing out of the old city center, supported by the commercial links between the port of Gijón and the American colonies. In the 18th century, due to the French invasions, the wars and the financial trouble in the era, the development stopped until late in the century, when the Oviedo-Gijón road was created and the port was recognized as the best one in Asturias, favoring the start of industrial activities in the town.

=== Contemporary history ===
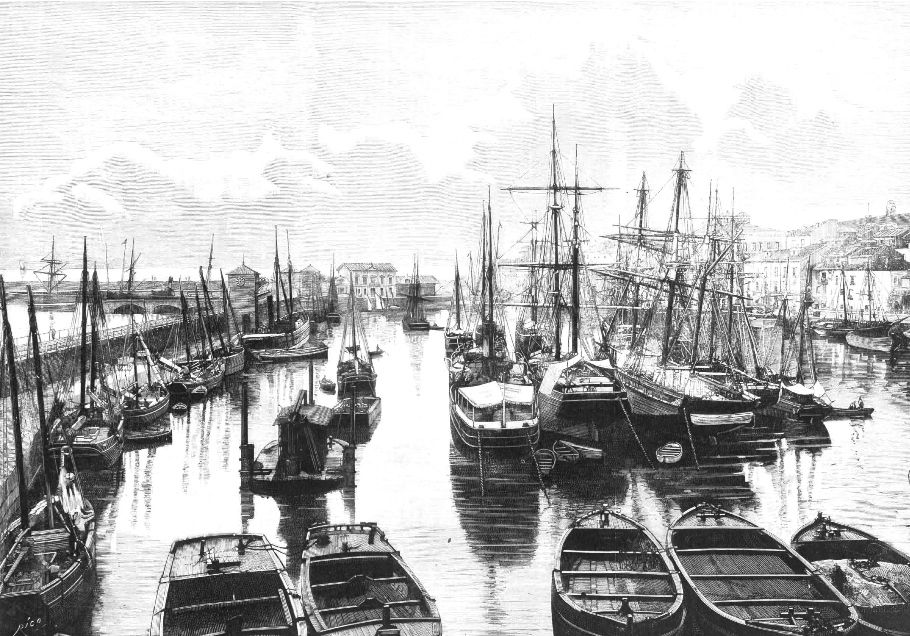
Engraving depicting the port published in 1884

The 19th century brought with it great development, with the commerce of coal, the Gijón–León road and later the Langreo–Gijón railway. All this contributed to the quick expansion of the port, since the intensity of the traffic overflowed the port. A new port, El Musel, was built in 1893 and it was the first coal port of the peninsula.

Gijón was going through a conversion to an industrial town with a new bourgeois and an urban development, opening new streets and squares, with new municipal equipments like water, garbage collection, lighting, and so on. All this industrial development brought new manpower to the city and the creation of new neighborhoods like Natahoyo, La Calzada, Tremañes or El Humedal.

In the 20th century, with the Spanish Civil War, the city supported the Republican faction. The army was located in El Coto. The resistance was eliminated in August 1936. Later, the city was the capital of the Sovereign Council of Asturias and León until 20 October 1937, when the troops of General Francisco Franco occupied the city.

Iron manufacture was the main industry of Gijón from the last years of the 19th century until the last decades of the 20th. Uninsa was created in 1971, and it merged with Ensidesa. In the last years of the century was converted in Aceralia, and integrated in Arcelor, along with the Luxembourg-based Arbed and the French company Usinor. The last decades of the century brought an industrial crisis affecting mainly iron manufacture and local shipbuilding. This brought new terrain for the creation of new beaches, parks and neighborhoods. A campus of the University of Oviedo was built as well.

== Geography ==
Orthophotomaps of Gijón
Gijón city center

West Gijón

East Gijón

South Gijón

The city is situated on the coast of central Asturias, from sea level to an altitude of 513 m (1,683 ft) at Picu Samartín and 672 m (2,205 ft) at Peña de los Cuatro Jueces, bordered on the West by Carreño, the East by Villaviciosa, and to the South by Siero and Llanera. The city is situated along the Asturian coast and is distinguished by the peninsula of Cimavilla (the original settlement) which separates the beach of San Lorenzo and adjacent neighborhoods to the east from the beaches of Poniente and Arbeyal, the shipyards, and the recreational port and the Port of El Musel to the west. It is close to the other main Asturian cities, Oviedo and Avilés.

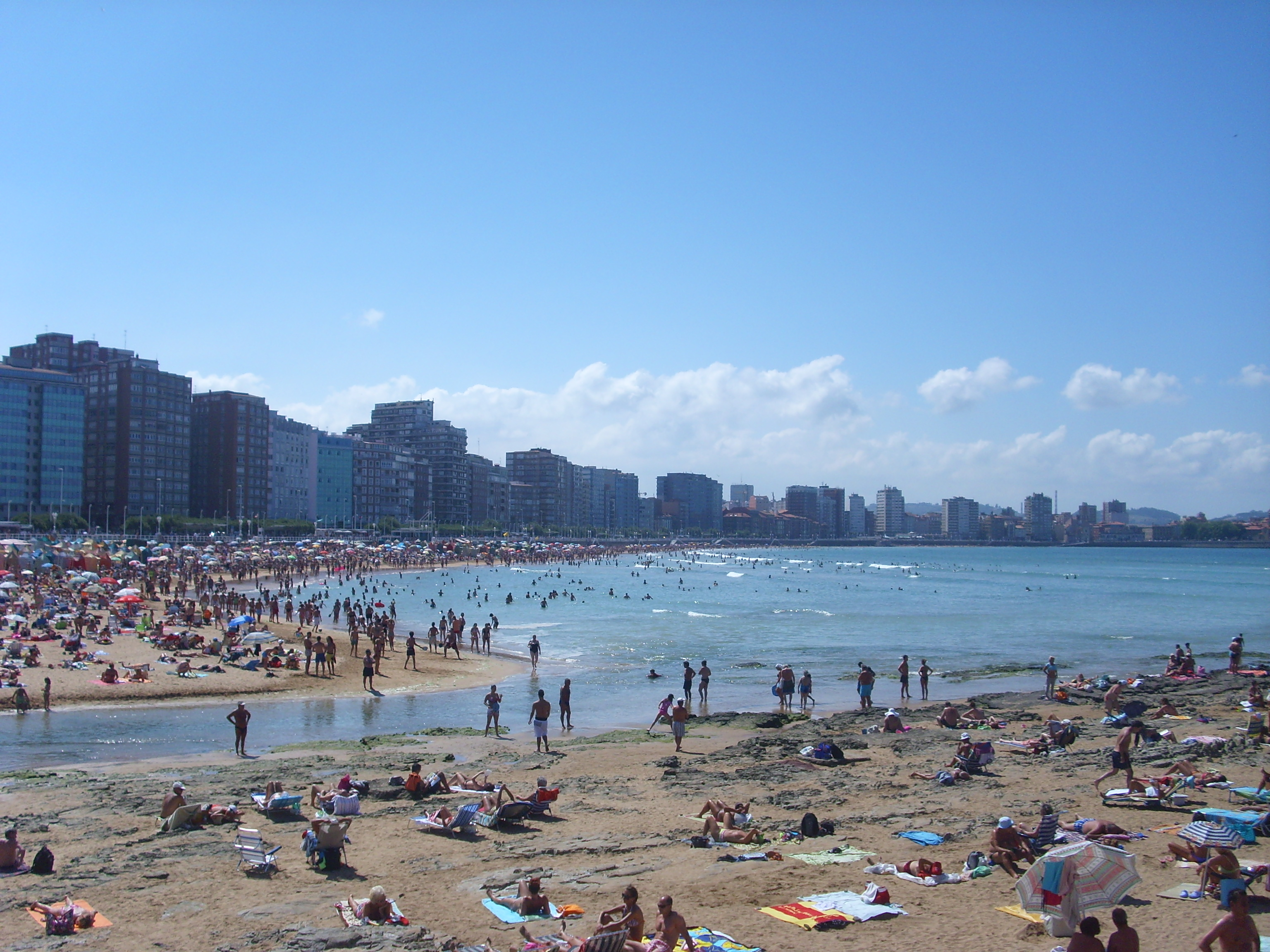
San Lorenzo bay

=== Climate ===
Gijón has a temperate oceanic climate (Köppen climate classification Cfb) typical of the Atlantic coast of Spain, with cool summers and wet and mostly mild winters. The onshore flow from the Atlantic Ocean creates a cool summer and mild winter climate where severe heat and very cold temperatures are rare. The narrow temperature range is demonstrated by the record August temperature being only 6.4 °C warmer than the all-time record January temperature. The climate is wet and cloudy by Spanish standards, but is indeed drier than other locations on the Atlantic in the country. Humidity is high year-round.

Summer temperatures are very consistent as proven by the fact that the all-time warmest month of August 1997 had an average temperature of 20.9 °C (69.6 °F) and no month has ever been recorded at an average high above 24.7 °C (76.5 °F) in comparison to the 23.2 °C (73.8 °F) August normal high. Another clear underlining of the marine influence is that the coolest ever August has been as near the average as 17.9 °C (64.2 °F).

Climate data for Gijón (1991–2020, extremes since 1938)
Month	Jan	Feb	Mar	Apr	May	Jun	Jul	Aug	Sep	Oct	Nov	Dec	Year
Record high °C (°F)	23.6 (74.5)	28.8 (83.8)	31.0 (87.8)	29.0 (84.2)	35.0 (95.0)	36.4 (97.5)	31.4 (88.5)	32.4 (90.3)	34.6 (94.3)	30.4 (86.7)	27.0 (80.6)	25.0 (77.0)	38.5 (101.3)
Mean daily maximum °C (°F)	13.7 (56.7)	13.7 (56.7)	15.1 (59.2)	16.0 (60.8)	18.0 (64.4)	20.5 (68.9)	22.5 (72.5)	23.4 (74.1)	21.7 (71.1)	19.4 (66.9)	16.0 (60.8)	14.4 (57.9)	17.8 (64.0)
Daily mean °C (°F)	10.2 (50.4)	10.0 (50.0)	11.6 (52.9)	12.7 (54.9)	14.9 (58.8)	17.6 (63.7)	19.7 (67.5)	20.4 (68.7)	18.6 (65.5)	16.0 (60.8)	12.7 (54.9)	10.9 (51.6)	14.5 (58.1)
Mean daily minimum °C (°F)	6.6 (43.9)	6.5 (43.7)	8.1 (46.6)	9.5 (49.1)	12.0 (53.6)	14.8 (58.6)	17.0 (62.6)	17.4 (63.3)	15.5 (59.9)	12.7 (54.9)	9.3 (48.7)	7.4 (45.3)	11.4 (52.5)
Record low °C (°F)	−4.6 (23.7)	−4.0 (24.8)	−2.0 (28.4)	0.4 (32.7)	2.5 (36.5)	5.8 (42.4)	8.6 (47.5)	8.2 (46.8)	5.0 (41.0)	2.6 (36.7)	−1.4 (29.5)	−4.8 (23.4)	−4.8 (23.4)
Average precipitation mm (inches)	99.5 (3.92)	84.1 (3.31)	80.7 (3.18)	81.0 (3.19)	63.2 (2.49)	56.1 (2.21)	38.2 (1.50)	57.5 (2.26)	66.5 (2.62)	105.6 (4.16)	135.0 (5.31)	116.3 (4.58)	983.7 (38.73)
Average precipitation days (≥ 1 mm)	12.8	10.9	10.8	12.1	10.0	7.6	6.3	7.6	8.3	11.4	14.2	12.8	124.8
Mean monthly sunshine hours	123	134	161	184	210	211	219	222	183	157	116	114	2,034
Source: Météo Climat

Climate data for Gijón (1971–2000)
Month	Jan	Feb	Mar	Apr	May	Jun	Jul	Aug	Sep	Oct	Nov	Dec	Year
Record high °C (°F)	23.6 (74.5)	23.0 (73.4)	27.0 (80.6)	28.0 (82.4)	31.8 (89.2)	36.4 (97.5)	31.4 (88.5)	30.0 (86.0)	34.6 (94.3)	30.4 (86.7)	26.1 (79.0)	25.0 (77.0)	36.4 (97.5)
Mean daily maximum °C (°F)	13.1 (55.6)	13.8 (56.8)	14.9 (58.8)	15.6 (60.1)	17.8 (64.0)	20.2 (68.4)	22.4 (72.3)	23.2 (73.8)	21.8 (71.2)	19.0 (66.2)	15.6 (60.1)	14.0 (57.2)	17.6 (63.7)
Daily mean °C (°F)	8.9 (48.0)	9.6 (49.3)	10.7 (51.3)	11.8 (53.2)	14.3 (57.7)	16.9 (62.4)	19.2 (66.6)	19.7 (67.5)	17.9 (64.2)	15.0 (59.0)	11.6 (52.9)	9.9 (49.8)	13.8 (56.8)
Mean daily minimum °C (°F)	4.7 (40.5)	5.4 (41.7)	6.6 (43.9)	8.1 (46.6)	10.9 (51.6)	13.6 (56.5)	16.0 (60.8)	16.2 (61.2)	14.1 (57.4)	11.0 (51.8)	7.6 (45.7)	5.8 (42.4)	10.0 (50.0)
Record low °C (°F)	−4.6 (23.7)	−4.0 (24.8)	−2.0 (28.4)	0.4 (32.7)	3.2 (37.8)	5.8 (42.4)	8.6 (47.5)	8.2 (46.8)	5.0 (41.0)	2.6 (36.7)	−1.4 (29.5)	−4.8 (23.4)	−4.8 (23.4)
Average precipitation mm (inches)	94 (3.7)	85 (3.3)	74 (2.9)	93 (3.7)	79 (3.1)	47 (1.9)	45 (1.8)	54 (2.1)	70 (2.8)	104 (4.1)	120 (4.7)	104 (4.1)	971 (38.2)
Average precipitation days (≥ 1 mm)	12	11	10	12	11	7	6	7	8	11	12	12	121
Mean monthly sunshine hours	103	109	137	151	167	180	194	190	158	132	106	92	1,721
Source: Agencia Estatal de Meteorología

Climate data for Gijón urban center (2002-2016)
Month	Jan	Feb	Mar	Apr	May	Jun	Jul	Aug	Sep	Oct	Nov	Dec	Year
Mean maximum °C (°F)	19.9 (67.8)	20.6 (69.1)	22.1 (71.8)	22.0 (71.6)	22.6 (72.7)	25.1 (77.2)	25.8 (78.4)	26.8 (80.2)	26.1 (79.0)	26.3 (79.3)	22.4 (72.3)	19.9 (67.8)	28.7 (83.7)
Mean daily maximum °C (°F)	13.2 (55.8)	13.6 (56.5)	14.8 (58.6)	16.0 (60.8)	17.8 (64.0)	20.6 (69.1)	22.6 (72.7)	23.2 (73.8)	21.9 (71.4)	19.8 (67.6)	16.2 (61.2)	14.6 (58.3)	17.8 (64.0)
Daily mean °C (°F)	10.4 (50.7)	10.3 (50.5)	11.6 (52.9)	13.0 (55.4)	15.0 (59.0)	17.9 (64.2)	19.8 (67.6)	20.4 (68.7)	19.0 (66.2)	16.6 (61.9)	13.1 (55.6)	11.3 (52.3)	14.8 (58.6)
Mean daily minimum °C (°F)	7.6 (45.7)	7.0 (44.6)	8.4 (47.1)	10.1 (50.2)	12.1 (53.8)	15.2 (59.4)	17.1 (62.8)	17.5 (63.5)	16.0 (60.8)	13.4 (56.1)	10.1 (50.2)	8.0 (46.4)	11.8 (53.2)
Mean minimum °C (°F)	3.2 (37.8)	2.8 (37.0)	3.9 (39.0)	6.0 (42.8)	8.3 (46.9)	11.7 (53.1)	13.8 (56.8)	14.4 (57.9)	12.2 (54.0)	8.7 (47.7)	5.2 (41.4)	3.3 (37.9)	1.9 (35.4)
Average precipitation mm (inches)	113.2 (4.46)	97.8 (3.85)	87.0 (3.43)	80.6 (3.17)	63.6 (2.50)	57.1 (2.25)	32.1 (1.26)	43.2 (1.70)	49.1 (1.93)	88.8 (3.50)	131.5 (5.18)	100.9 (3.97)	944.9 (37.20)
Source: Météo Climat

== Government ==
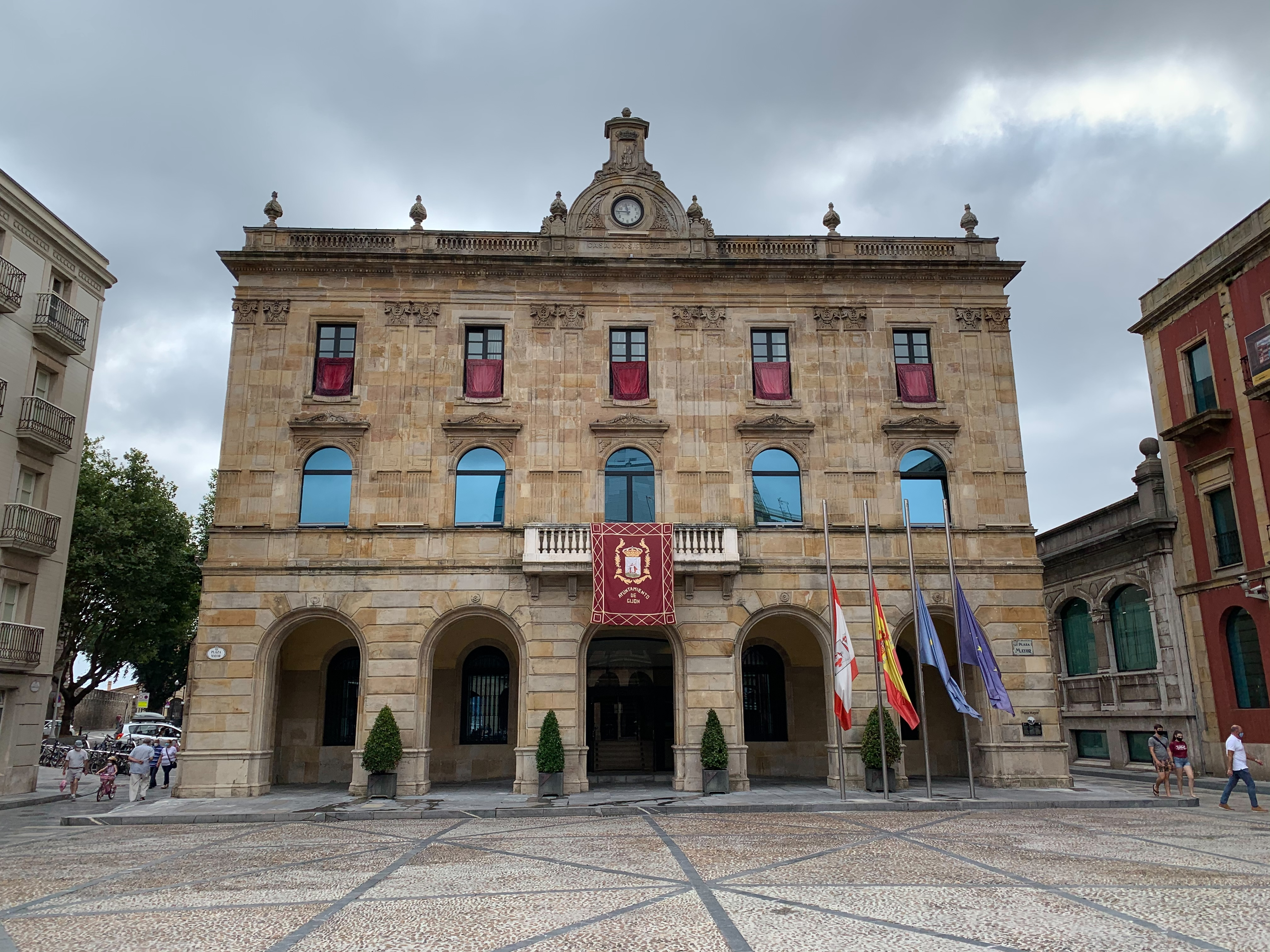
Town hall in Plaza Mayor

PSOE governed the city from 1979 to 2011, the longest continuous period since Spain's transition to democracy.

Carmen Moriyón, the current mayor, was elected mayor on 17 June 2023. She is a member of Asturian Forum.

=== Councillors distribution in local elections ===
Councilors for Gijón since 1979
Key to parties XSP Podemos PCA–PCE IU–IX PSOE UGJ UCD Cs CDS CD FAC PP CP AP Vox
Election	Distribution	Mayor
1979	4 / 13 / 9 / 1	José Manuel Palacio (PSOE)
1983	3 / 17 / 7	Vicente Álvarez Areces (PSOE)
1987	3 / 11 / 6 / 7	Vicente Álvarez Areces (PSOE)
1991	3 / 13 / 3 / 9	Vicente Álvarez Areces (PSOE)
1995	4 / 12 / 11	Vicente Álvarez Areces (PSOE)
1999	2 / 16 / 9	Paz Fernández Felgueroso (PSOE)
2003	3 / 13 / 11	Paz Fernández Felgueroso (PSOE)
2007	2 / 13 / 12	Paz Fernández Felgueroso (PSOE)
2011	3 / 10 / 9 / 5	Carmen Moriyón (FAC)
2015	6 / 2 / 7 / 1 / 8 / 3	Carmen Moriyón (FAC)
2019	3 / 1 / 11 / 4 / 3 / 3 / 2	Ana González (PSOE)
2023	1 / 2 / 9 / 5 / 8 / 2	Carmen Moriyón (Foro)

=== Districts ===
Gijón is divided in six districts: Center, East, South, West, El Llano and Rural. In this last one, all the peri-urban zone and the rural parishes are integrated.

==== Neighborhoods and parishes ====
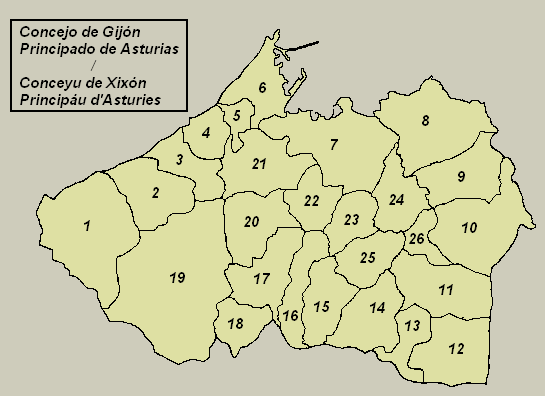
Gijón parishes

Center district

- Centro
- Cimavilla
- Laviada

Eastern district

- L'Arena
- El Bibio
- Ceares / Ciares
- El Coto
- Les Mestes
- Viesques

El Llano district

- El Llano

South district

- Contrueces
- Montevil
- Nuevo Gijón / La Peral
- Perchera-La Braña
- El Polígono
- Pumarín
- Roces (22)
- Santa Bárbara

Western district

- La Calzada
- Jove / Xove (6)
- Tremañes (21)
- El Natahoyo
- Moreda

Rural district

- L'Abadía Cenero (19)
- Cabueñes (9)
- Caldones (11)
- Castiello Bernueces (24)
- Deva (10)
- Fano (13)
- Fresno (3)
- Granda (23)
- La Pedrera (17)
- Llavandera (14)
- Leorio / Llorio (16)
- Puao (4)
- Porceyo (20)
- Ruedes (18)
- Samartín de Güerces (15)
- San Andrés de los Tacones (2)
- Santurio (26)
- Serín (1)
- Somió (8)
- Valdornón (12)
- Vega (25)
- Veriña (5)

== Demographics ==
Historical population
Year	Pop.	±%
1842	16,558	—
1857	23,621	+42.7%
1877	30,746	+30.2%
1887	35,144	+14.3%
1900	46,813	+33.2%
1910	55,088	+17.7%
1920	57,857	+5.0%
1930	78,173	+35.1%
1940	101,515	+29.9%
1950	108,546	+6.9%
1960	122,357	+12.7%
1970	184,698	+51.0%
1981	256,433	+38.8%
1991	259,067	+1.0%
2001	266,419	+2.8%
2011	276,969	+4.0%
2021	269,311	−2.8%
Source: INE

As of 2025, the population is 271,259, of which 47.1% are males, and 52.9% are females. Minors make up 12.5% of the population, and seniors make up 28.2%.

The population of Gijón grew remarkably throughout the 20th century, especially between the 1960s and 1980s, a period in which it doubled. Starting in the 1990s, growth stagnated, reflecting the similar slowdown of the country. However, due to immigration, both from other Asturias councils and from abroad, the population started to increase again at the turn of the 21st century.

=== Immigration ===
As of 2025, immigrants make up 13.5% of the population. The 5 largest foreign countries of birth are Venezuela, Colombia, Cuba, Argentina, and Romania.

Foreign-born population (2025)
Country of birth	Population
Venezuela	4,687
Colombia	4,524
Cuba	2,446
Argentina	2,083
Romania	1,769
Dominican Republic	1,570
Ecuador	1,261
Morocco	1,258
Brazil	1,254
Peru	1,106
Paraguay	1,066
Belgium	989
France	971
Ukraine	946
Germany	806

== Culture ==
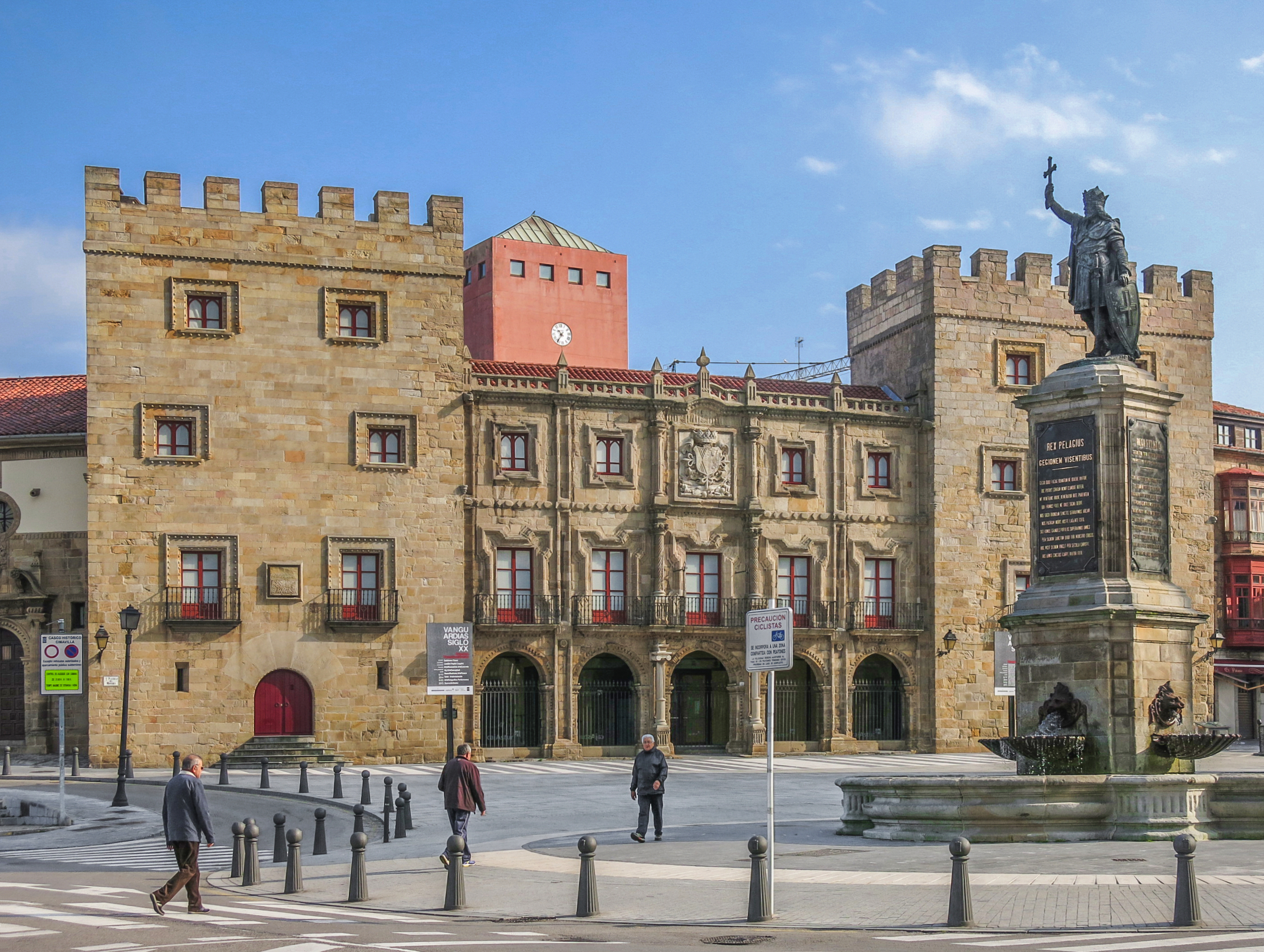
Revillagigedo barroque palace and statue of King Pelagius

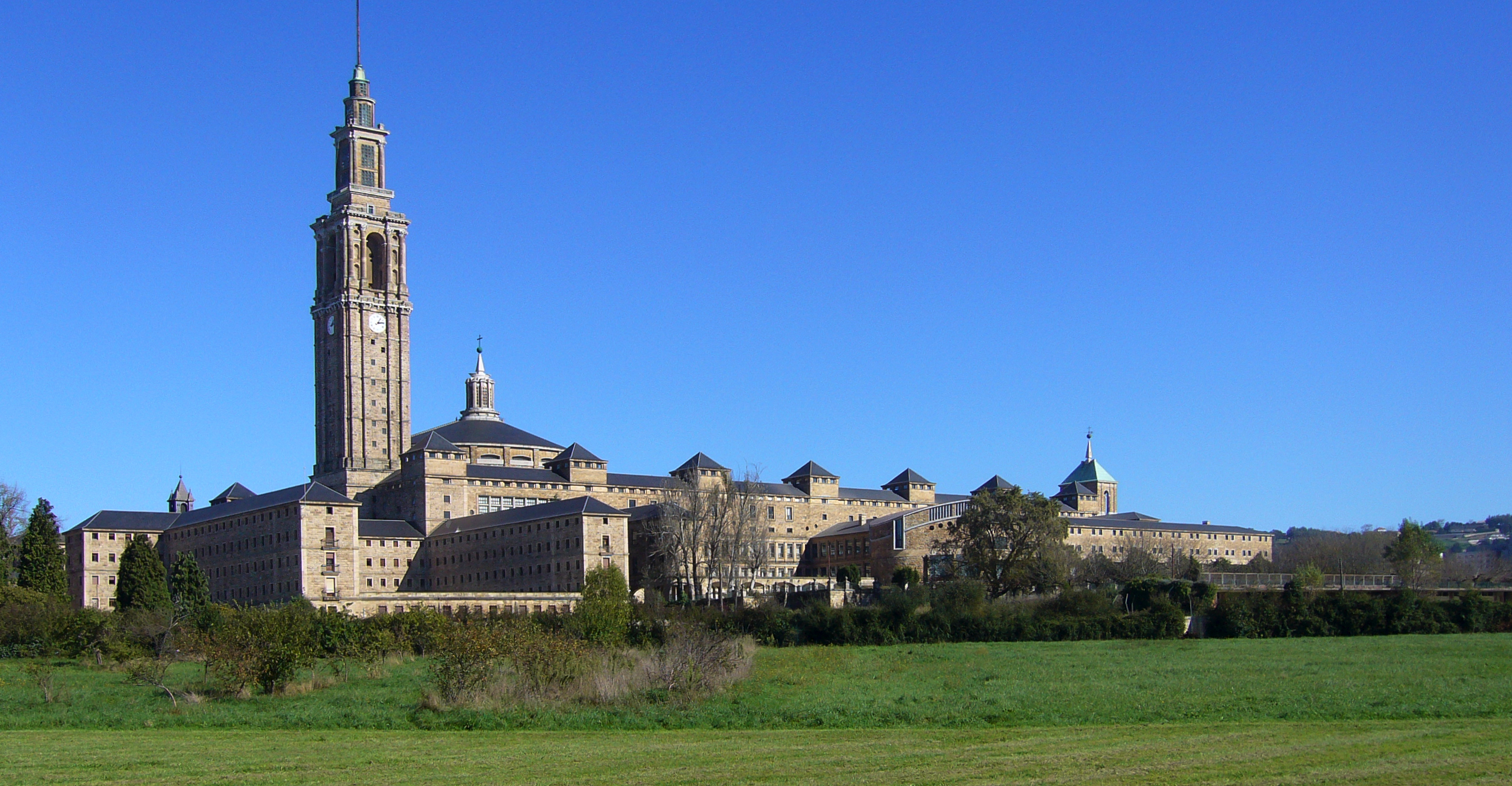
Old Universidad Laboral, today LABoral Ciudad de la Cultura, biggest building in Spain

Cultural activities take place throughout the year, particularly in the summer months, and especially in August due to the Feast of the Assumption, with parties, music and theater. This complements the continuous programming of the Teatro Municipal Jovellanos (Jovellanos Municipal Theater). The various festivities carried out in Gijón include:

- The Iberoamerican Book Fair, in May
- The Semana Negra in July
- The Feria Internacional de Muestras de Asturias
- The Gijón International Film Festival
- The Semana Mágica Festival, in December.

The Universidad Laboral de Gijón, completed in 1955, contains the LABoral Centro de Arte y Creación Industrial (Laboral Center of Art and Industrial Creation). The center was inaugurated on March 30, 2007 as an interdisciplinary space to promote artistic exchange and foster the relationship between society, art, science, technology and the creative industries.

In recent years, Gijón has become a stop city for the Cirque du Soleil. The performances of the Cirque du Soleil have been very successful in the city. In July 2004, Saltimbanco arrived and in the summer of 2007, they presented Alegría in Gijón, the first time that this tour stopped in northern Spain. During the summer of 2009, Cirque du Soleil returned to Gijón with the Varekai show.

Gijón is the birth place of several notable people, like Gaspar Melchor de Jovellanos, statesman, author, philosopher and a major figure of the Age of Enlightenment.

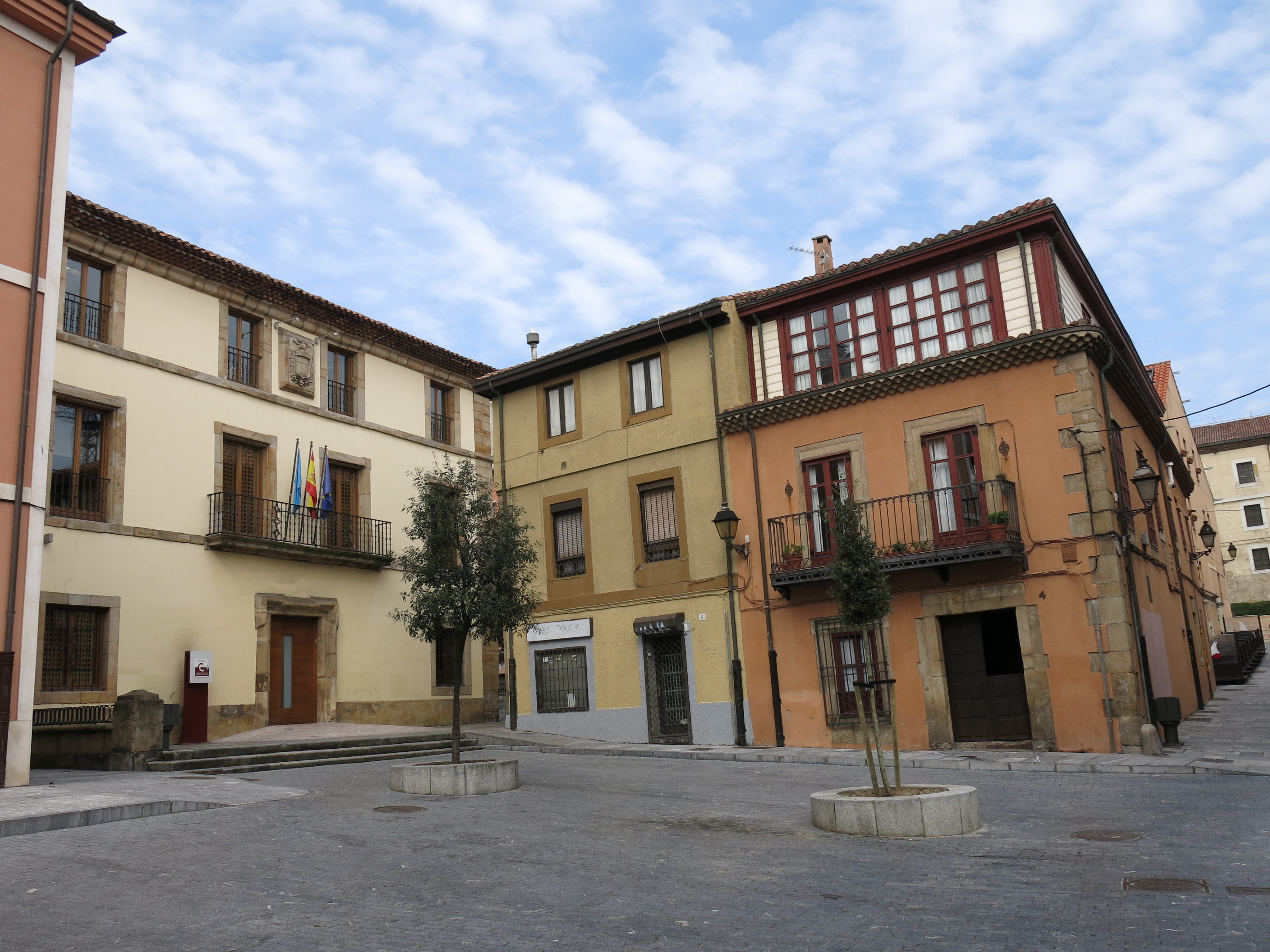
Cimavilla Old Town

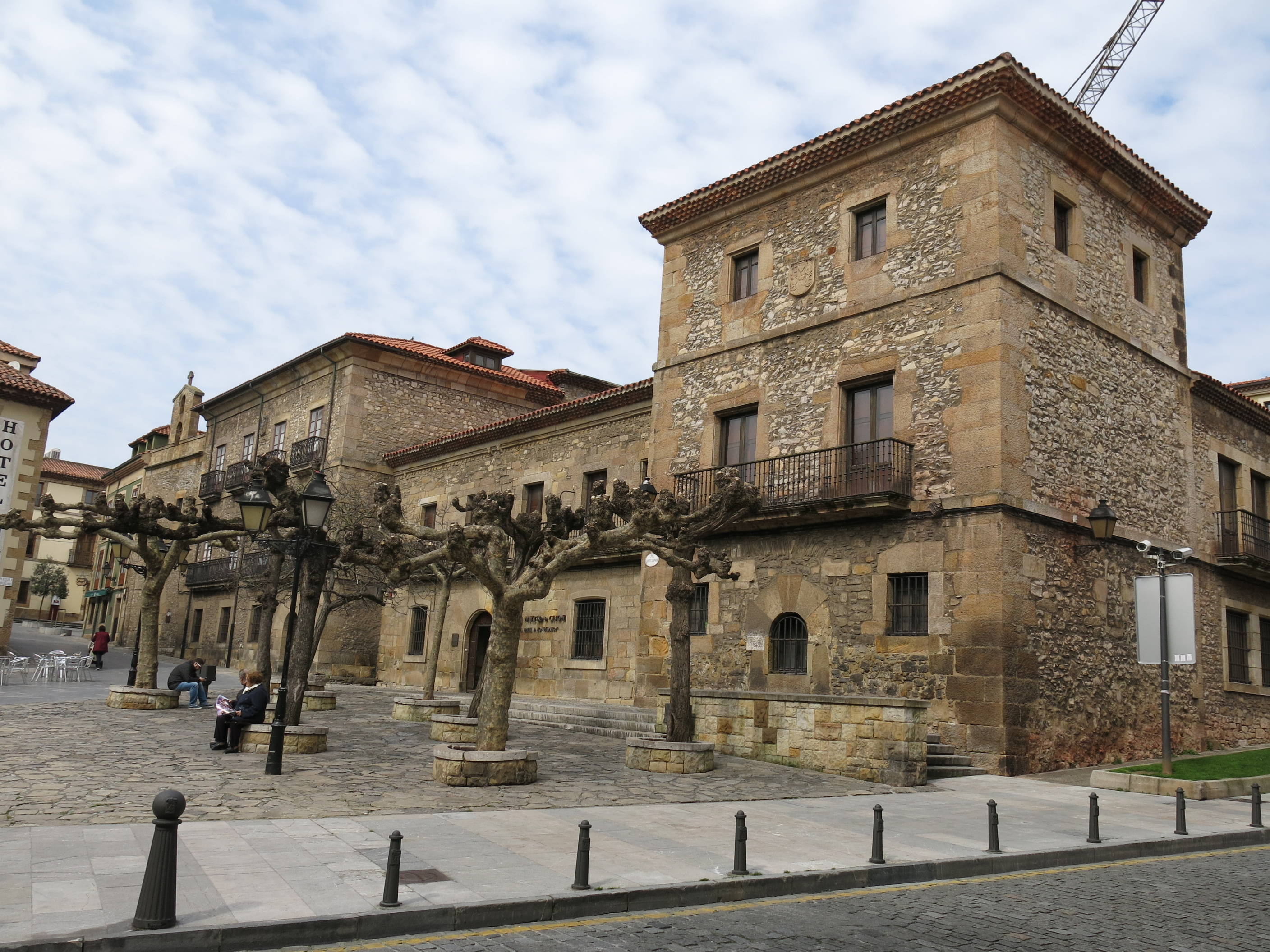
Jovellanos birth house

=== Film ===
José Luis Garci filmed most of the footage from the film Volver a empezar in the city during the early 1980s. The film would later win an Academy Award for Best Foreign Film. In the early 1990s there was a boom in indie music bands in the town, which became known as the "Xixón Sound". The comedy Mortadelo & Filemon: The Big Adventure was also filmed in part in the City of Culture of Gijón. In 2009, the Laboral and its surroundings were converted to the University of Oxford for Fernando González Molina's film, Brain Drain.

Amalia Ulman's 2021 film El Planeta was shot in and discusses Gijon.

=== Museums and art galleries ===
- Museum of the Asturian People
- Railway museum of Asturias
- Nicanor Piñole museum
- Campo Valdés Roman Baths Museum
- Juan Barjola Museum, a museum about a local painter, also interested in avant-garde art
- Evaristo Valle museum, local painter museum placed in a mansion at the outskirts
- International Bagpipe Museum contains bagpipes from around the world, focusing on the Asturian musical heritage and bagpipes.
- Atlantic botanical garden
- Archaeological park Campa Torres.
- Revillagigedo Palace and museum at Marqués square, near the City Hall
- Gijón Aquarium
- Roman Town of Veranes
- LABoral Centro de Arte y Creación Industrial, an exhibition center for contemporary art, science, technology and advanced visual industries

== Parks and gardens ==
The main parks and gardens in Gijón are:

Park	Surface area (m²)
Parque de los Pericones	401,398
Parque Fluvial del Piles	295,849
Parque de Isabel la Católica	154,218
Parque de Moreda	96,878
Parque del Cerro Santa Catalina	72,456
Parque del Lauredal	54,161
Parque Inglés / Hermanos Castro	52,876
Jardines de Begoña - Los Campinos	19,612

== Sport ==
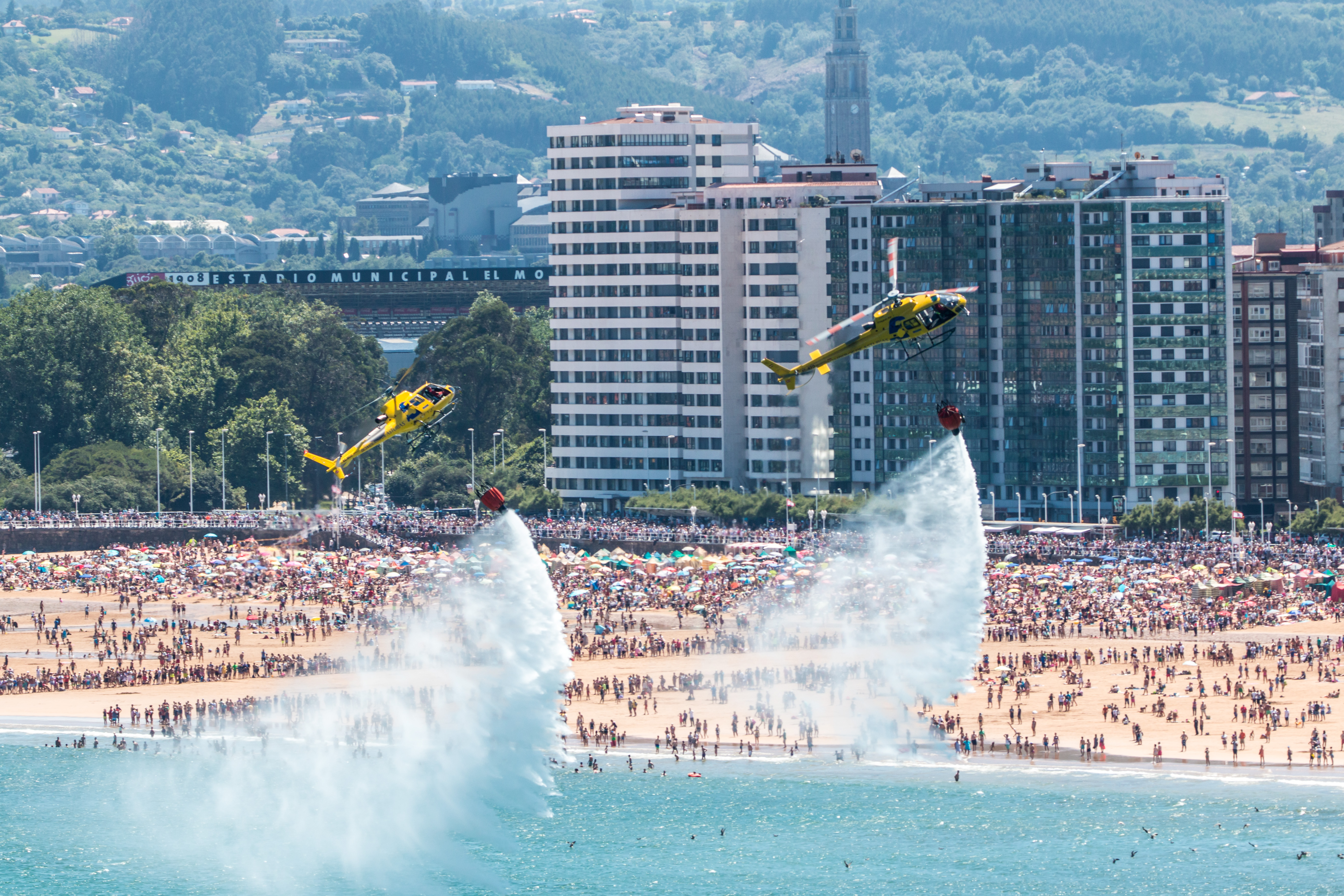
Air Summer Festival in San Lorenzo Beach

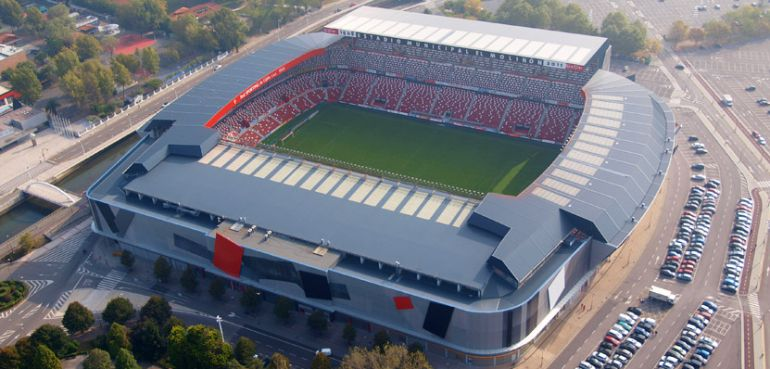
Estadio El Molinón.

In team sports, Gijón's professional football team, Sporting de Gijón, currently plays in the Spanish second division. CP Gijón Solimar is one of the most important women's roller hockey teams in Europe as it is five times champion of the European Cup.

Círculo Gijón is the main basketball team of the city, and plays in Spanish basketball third tier. Gijón Baloncesto, folded in 2009, was the most important team of this sport in Gijón, and played four seasons in the Liga ACB, the most important national league in Europe. A women's basketball club, CD Basket Mar, existed in Gijón between 1997 and 2018.

CSI Gijón is Spain's official show jumping horse show which is held annually in Gijón's equestrian facility.

There is also a private sports club in Gijón with more than 33,000 members, Real Grupo de Cultura Covadonga, the biggest club in Asturias. Its handball section plays in the third division, where also plays AB Gijón Jovellanos, and its women's volleyball team plays also in the Spanish second league.

Not far from Gijón, there are several ski resorts in Asturias, the main being Valgrande-Pajares.

The city's marina houses an important fleet of yachts and is the base for many water sports, being Royal Astur Yacht Club the most important yacht club in town.

In 2022, the city hosted an ATP 250 tennis tournament for the first time.

=== Sports venues ===
The biggest sport centers in Gijón are Estadio El Molinón, with 30,000 seats, Plaza de Toros de El Bibio with 12,000 and Palacio de Deportes with 5,000 seats. Games were played in town during the 1982 FIFA World Cup.

The city has in total 13 public sport centers (in Spanish: Centros Municipales Integrados) with swimming pools, gyms and saunas. Swimming pools are free for children up to age 14.

== Economy ==
For much of the 20th century the town was heavily dependent on mature heavy industries, but at the end of the Francoism, tertiary sector employment began to expand rapidly along with the city's population which by 2007 stood officially at 277,897 for Gijón proper, and approximately 380,000 for the total Gijón agglomeration.

The port is at the center of many of the local businesses. Apart from directly port related activities, the economy is based on tourism, steel (Arcelor), other metallurgy, livestock rearing and fisheries.

== Transport ==
=== Airports ===
Gijón is served by Asturias Airport, about 38 km (24 mi) from the center of the city; it is located in the municipality of Castrillón. The airport is connected to the city by the A-8 motorway, the N-632 national highway and scheduled bus service (Alsa).

=== Seaport ===
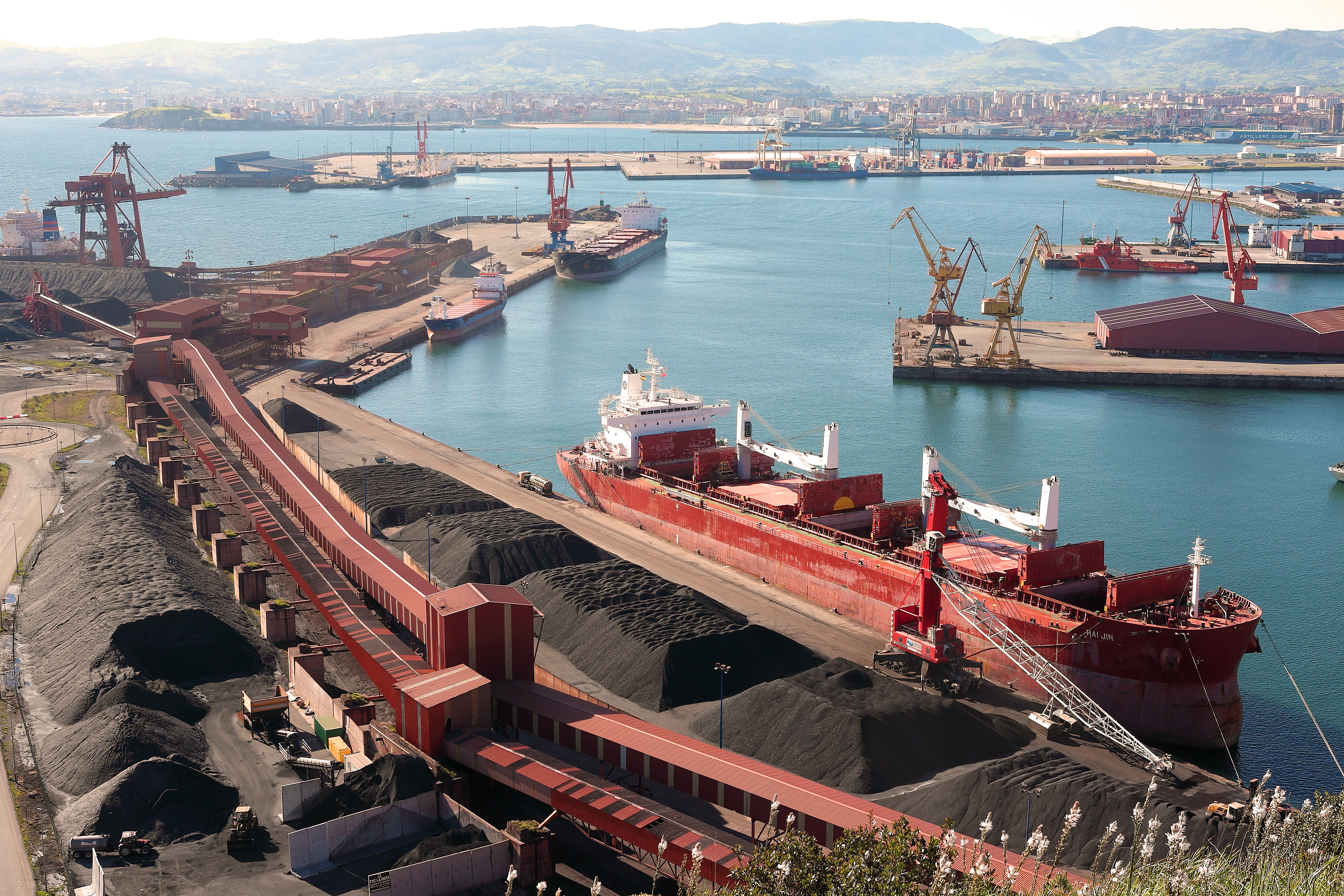
The port of El Musel, to the west of the city, as seen from Campa Torres.

The service offered by LD Lines has been canceled in Gijón. The closest Ferry services are now in Santander and Bilbao. However, Gijón still has a good freight service by El Musel

=== Public transport ===
Gijón currently has 18 bus lines and four more Búho (owl) lines. The owl services work on Friday and Saturday nights, and daily in the months of July and August.

=== Railway ===
The city is served by the Gijón Railway Station.

=== Roads and highways ===
Type	Name	Alternate name	Itinerary
Highway	A-8	Autovía del Cantábrico	Baamonde – Gijón – Llanes – Torrelavega – Solares – Bilbao – San Sebastián
Highway	A-66	Autovía Ruta de la Plata	Gijón – Oviedo – Mieres – León – Benavente – Zamora – Salamanca – Béjar – Plasencia – Mérida – Almendralejo – Sevilla
Highway	AS-I	Autovía Minera	Gijón – Pola de Siero – Langreo – Mieres
Highway	AS-II	Autovía Industrial	Gijón – Lugo de Llanera – Oviedo
Highway	GJ-10	Interior ring road	Gijón seaport (El Musel) – Pumarín – El Llano
Highway	GJ-20	Western ring road	GJ-81 (Autopista Acceso Sur a Gijón) – Tremañes – Gijón seaport (El Musel)
Highway	GJ-81	South access road	(A-8/A-66) – Plaza del Humedal
National road	N-630		Gijón – Oviedo – Mieres – Puerto de Pajares – León – Zamora – Salamanca – Plasencia – Mérida – Almendralejo – Sevilla
National road	N-632		Cenero – Cudillero – Muros del Nalón – Soto del Barco – Avilés – Gijón – Villaviciosa – Colunga – Caravia – Ribadesella
National road	N-641	El Musel access Road	Gijón – La Calzada – Gijón seaport (El Musel) .
Regional and local roads	AS-19	Gijón-Avilés Road	Gijón – El Empalme – Prendes – Tabaza – Avilés
Regional and local roads	AS-246	Carbonera Road	Gijón – Alto de la Madera – Noreña – El Berrón – La Gargantada – Langreo
Regional and local roads	AS-247	Piles to Infanzón Road	Gijón – Somió – Alto del Infanzón
Regional and local roads	AS-248	Gijón-Siero Road	Gijón – Vega de Poja – Pola de Siero
Regional and local roads	AS-266	Oviedo-Gijón Road	Oviedo – Lugones – Pruvia – Porceyo – Gijón
Regional and local roads	AS-19a	Gijón-Avilés Road	Puenteseco – Muniello

== Education ==
=== Universities ===
There are two campuses located in Gijón, one of the University of Oviedo and other of the National University of Distance Education.

==== University of Oviedo ====
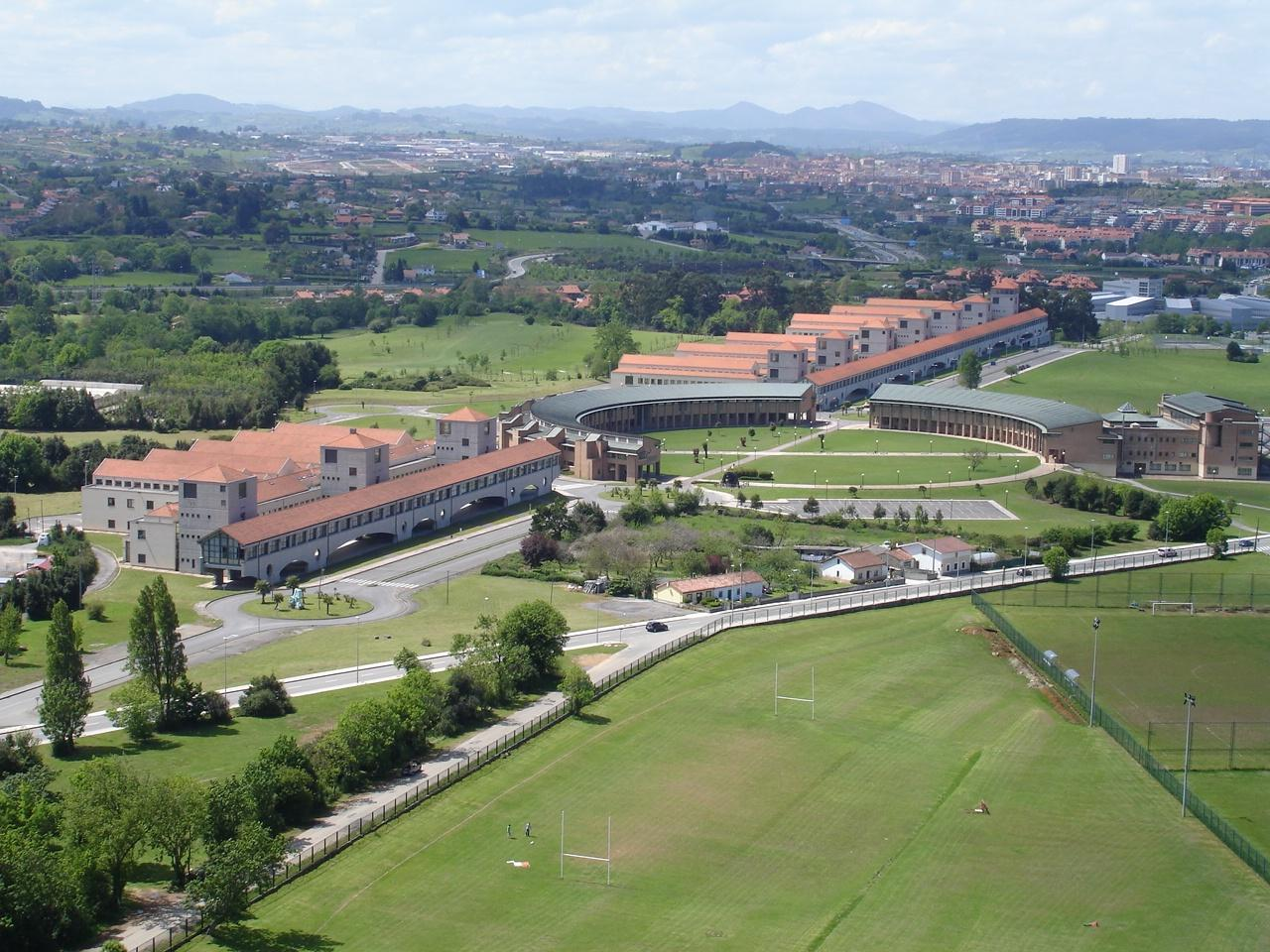
View of the campus of the Gijón Polytechnic School of Engineering

- Gijón Polytechnic School of Engineering.

Mechanical Engineering, Electrical Engineering, Electronic Engineering, Computers and Systems Engineering, Chemical Engineering and Telecommunication Engineering.

- School of Civil Navy.
- Faculty of Commerce, Tourism and Social Sciences "Jovellanos".

Public Administration and Management, Trade and Marketing, Tourism and Social work.

==== National University of Distance Education (UNED) ====
Gijón also has a delegation of the UNED, where different disciplines can be studied by distance.

== Notable people ==
- Lara Álvarez (born 1986), journalist and television presenter
- Carolina del Castillo Díaz (1867–1933), Spanish painter
- Pablo Carreño Busta (born 1991), tennis player
- Miguel Dongil y Sánchez (born 1987), historian
- Luis Enrique (born 1970), football manager and former football player
- Alberto Entrerríos (born 1976), former handball player
- Natalia Estrada (born 1972), actress, model, and television presenter
- Pipi Estrada (born 1957), journalist, television personality
- Susana Estrada (born 1950), actress, vedette, and singer
- Abelardo Fernández (born 1970), football manager and former football player
- Gaspar Melchor de Jovellanos (1744–1811), statesman, author, and philosopher
- Blanca Romero (born 1976), actress, model, and singer
- Sara Torres (born 1991) is a Spanish poet and novelist

== International relations ==
=== Twin towns – Sister cities ===
Gijón is twinned with:

- Albuquerque, United States
- Havana, Cuba
- Niort, France (since 1982)
- Novorossiysk, Russia (since 1986)
- Puerto Vallarta, Mexico
- Smara, Western Sahara
- Yantai, China (since 2023)

== See also ==
- List of municipalities in Asturias
