= Universidad Laboral de Gijón =

- Universidá Llaboral de Xixón
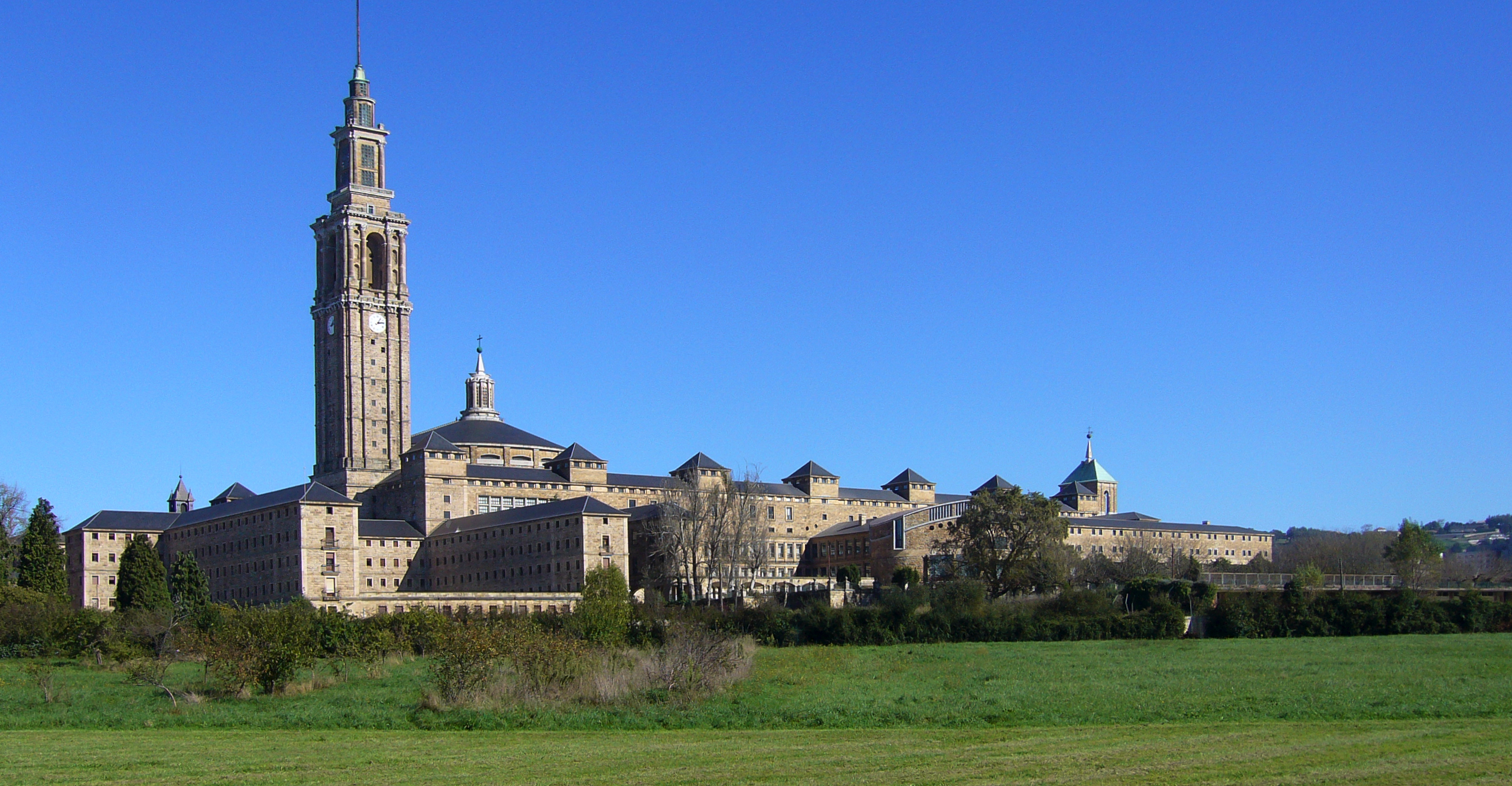
- Interactive map of the Universidad Laboral de Gijón area

General information
- Architectural style: Neo-Herrerian
- Location: Luis Moya Blanco, 261; 33203 Gijón (Asturias), Gijón, Asturias, Spain
- Coordinates: 43°31′28.08″N 5°36′54.16″W
- Construction started: 1946
- Completed: 1955
- Renovated: 2001–2007

Site notes
- Area: 45.64 ha

Spanish Cultural Heritage
- Official name: Universidad Laboral de Gijón
- Type: Non-movable
- Criteria: Monument
- Designated: 19 May 2016

The Universidad Laboral de Gijón (Asturian: Universidá Llaboral de Xixón) is a large building located in Gijón (Asturias, Spain) in the parish of Cabueñes. Originally built as a learning center for orphans, it currently hosts several cultural institutions.

== History ==
Built between 1946 and 1955 by the Ministry of Labour, it is considered the most important architectural work built in the 20th century in Asturias and, with its 270,000 m^{2}, the largest building in Spain, even larger than the Monastery of El Escorial. The building was originally built to educate orphans whose parents had died as a result of working in the mining industry. It is currently a multi-use facility.

Abandoned in the 1980s, the whole building was restored between 2001 and 2007.

On 19 May 2016, the Universidad Laboral was listed as a Bien de Interés Cultural heritage site.

On 12 February 2020, the Gijón city council, with the votes of left-wing parties PSOE, Podemos and IU, declined to launch a campaign for promoting the Universidad Laboral as a World Heritage Site by arguing it "reflects Francoism", since it was built during the dictatorship era, even though the idea of the building was born in the Second Republic.

== The building ==
Luis Moya, who designed the facility along the lines of the Parthenon in Athens, chose to have the main gate face away from the city, so that visitors coming from Gijón would have to walk around the university before entering, and therefore fully admire its magnificence.

=== Entrance ===
The main entrance, located in the main facade, is an arch with a shaped tower. Above the arch is a shield with the eagle of Saint John and the yoke and arrows of the Catholic Monarchs held by two angels.

=== Courtyard ===
The roofless courtyard with an area of 150×50 m^{2}. The entire building is structured around the courtyard.

=== Church ===
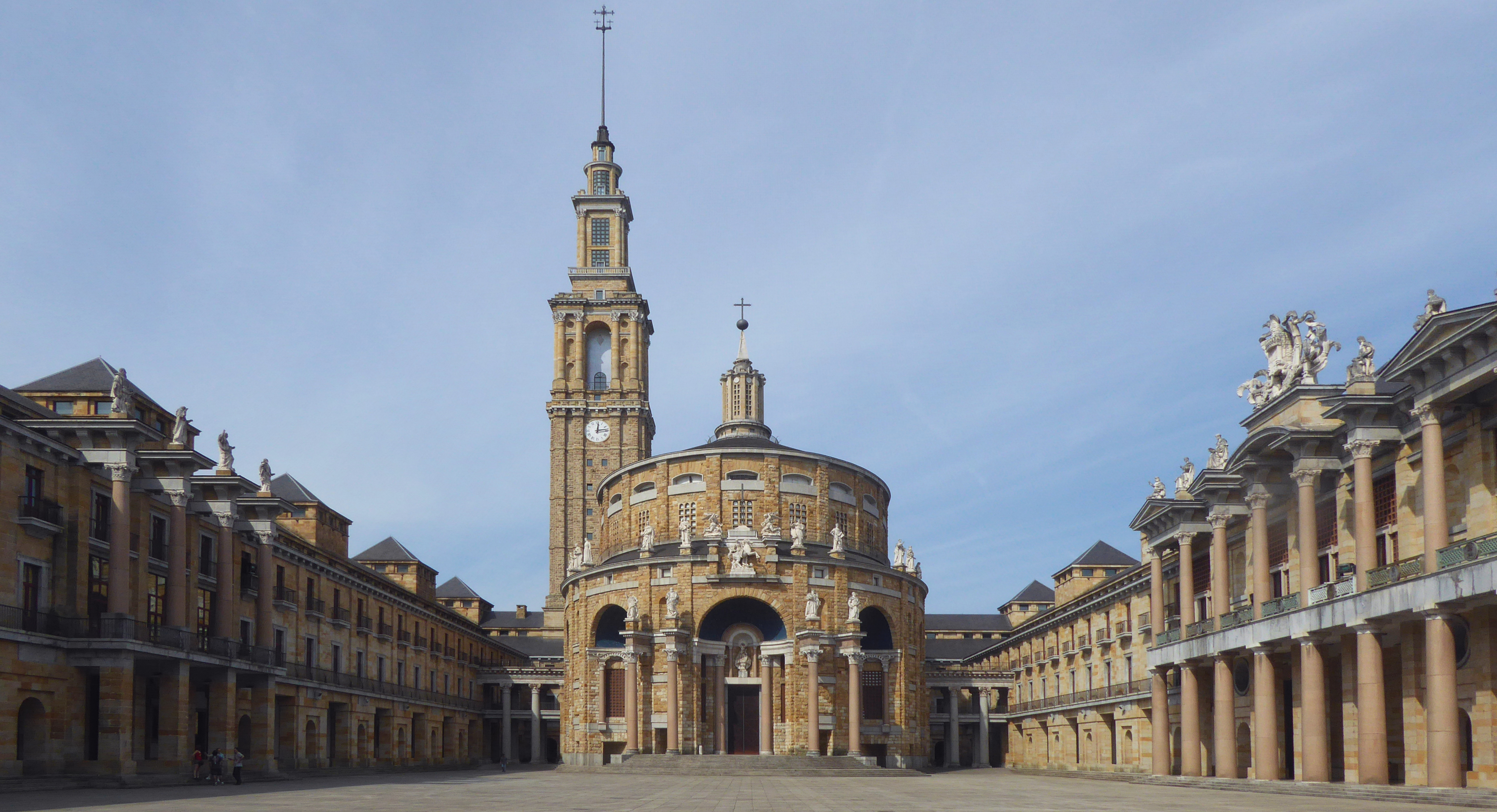
Circular church inside building ensemble of Universidad Laboral de Gijon

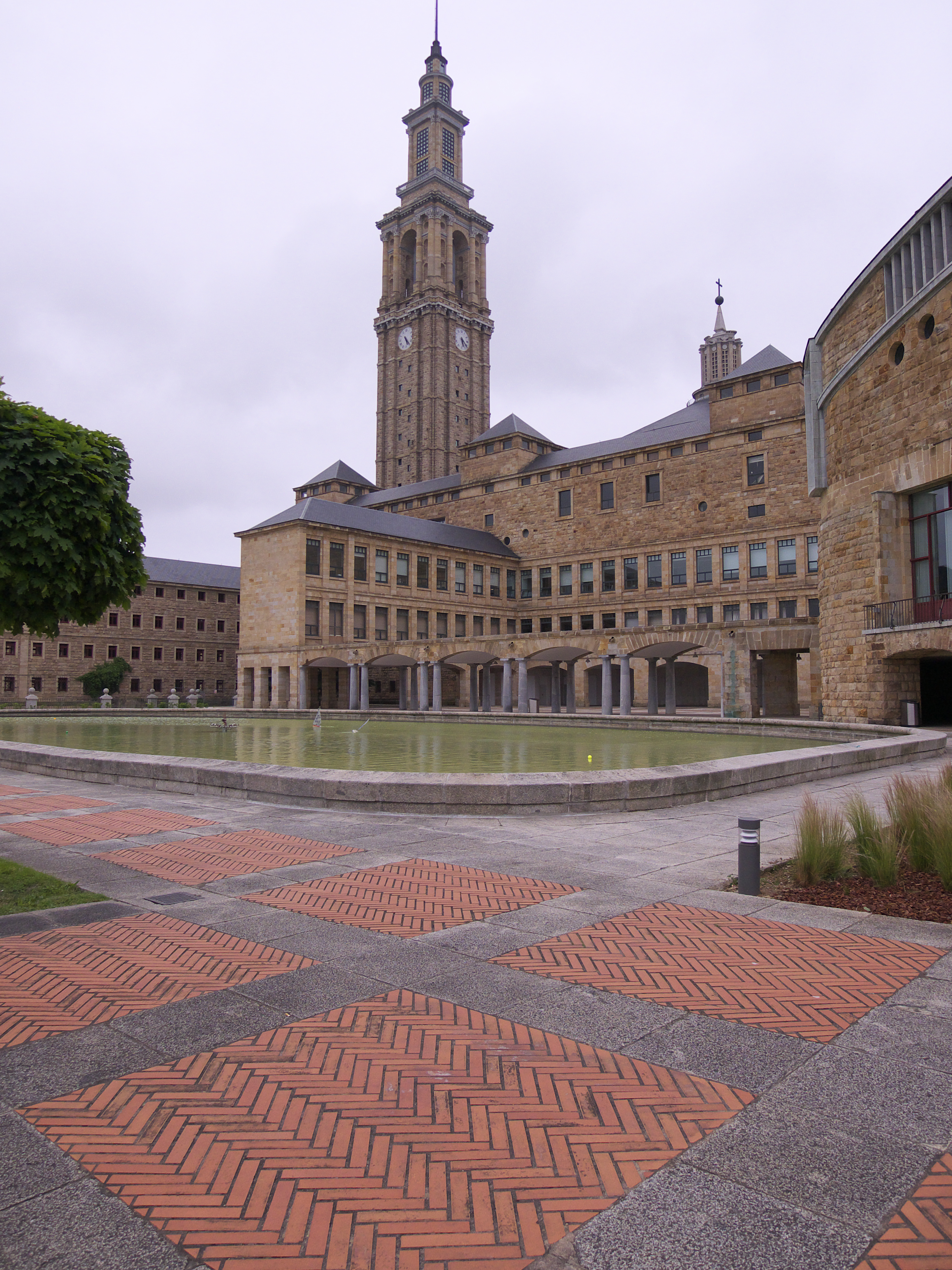
The tower of the Universidad Laboral

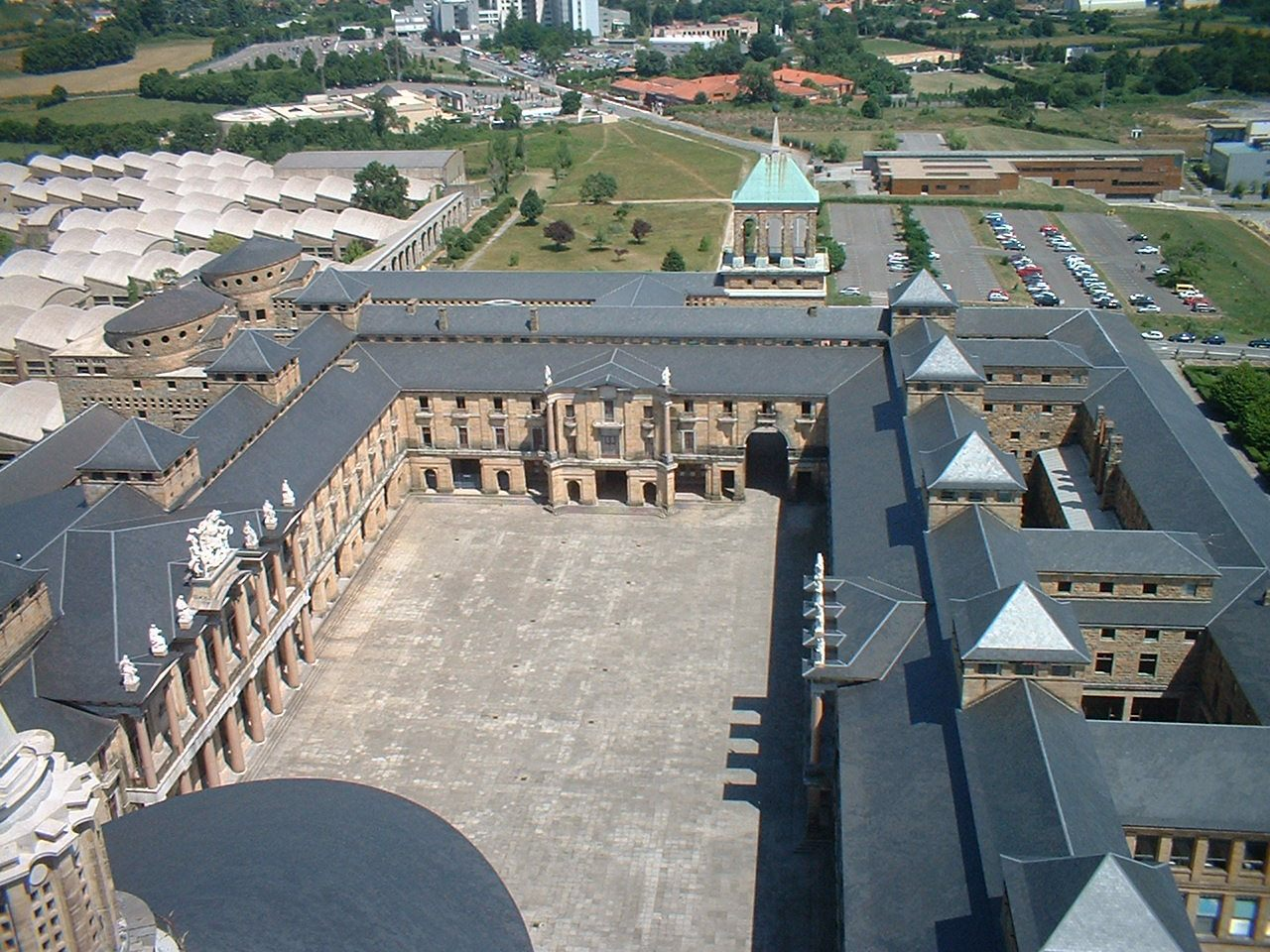
Aerial view of the courtyard

The church is considered the most spectacular building in the Universidad Laboral. The elliptical floor has a surface area of 807 m^{2}.

Outside, there is a figure of the Virgin of Covadonga with Corinthian columns sustaining the statues of saints Joseph, Peter, Paul and Ignatius. Above, St. James on horseback with two angels sustains the Victory Cross, the coat of arms of Asturias.

The church has a 2,300-ton dome. The height between the floor and the highest point of the dome is 32 m. During construction, approximately 450,000 bricks were used. The floor is entirely covered with marble and the pews, which can hold one thousand people, are made of special wood from Equatorial Guinea and customized for the church. The pews have been removed.

The church is unconsecrated and has no Catholic icon. It is currently used to host art exhibitions.

=== Theater ===
The theater has a Hellenic style facade and similar dimensions to the Parthenon. Above the central pediment there is a big coat of arms of Spain from 1945.

The capacity of the theater is about 1,500. It was the first totally air-conditioned theater, using an underground system of air distribution.

The frontispiece was decorated with a 120-m^{2} fresco of Enrique Segura. When the building was abandoned, it was damaged by humidity and was replaced by a big shell of wood to improve the acoustics.

=== Tower ===
With a height of 117 m, the tower is modeled after that of Giralda, the bell tower in the Cathedral of Seville. An elevator brings visitors to the balcony to enjoy sweeping views of Gijón.

The tower of the Universidad Laboral is the tallest building in Asturias and the tallest stone building in Spain.

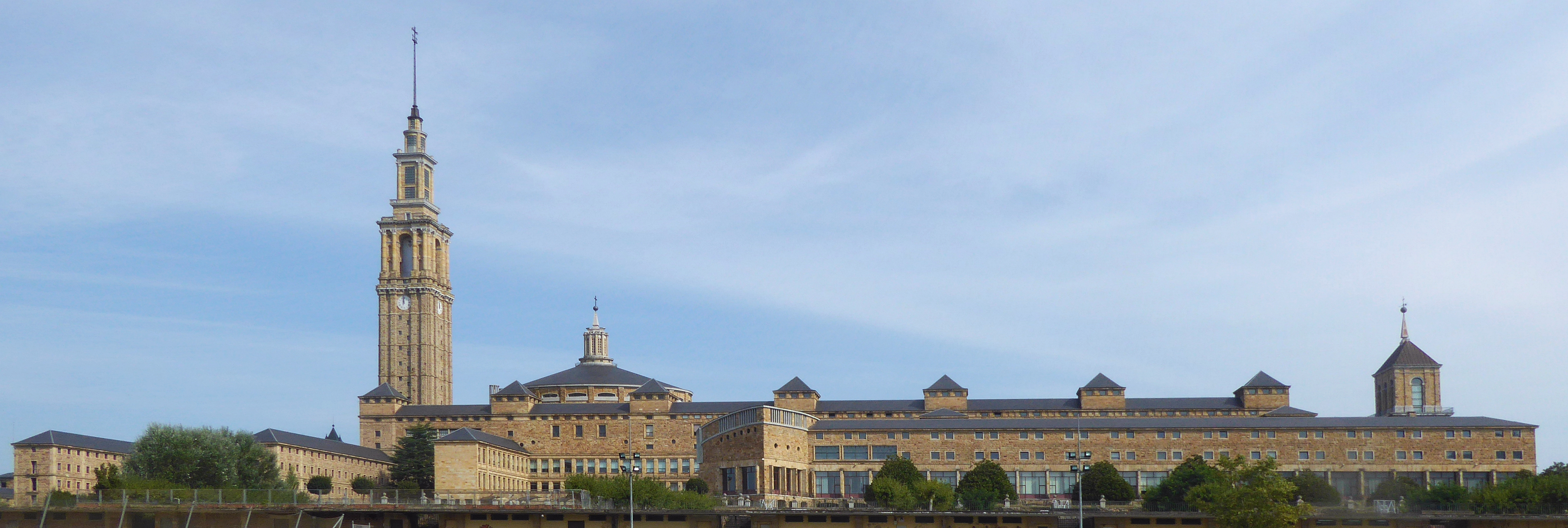
Panoramic view from the south: Complex of Universidad Laboral de Gijon

== Current uses ==
Several institutions are located in the main building, such as LABoral Centro de Arte y Creación Industrial, faculties of the University of Oviedo, the Drama High School of Asturias and the Professional Music School of Gijón. Laboral Ciudad de la Cultura was inaugurated in 2007.

In the rest of the lands bequeathed by the José Antonio Girón Foundation to the Universidad Laboral, other new facilities were created. In the Lloreda farm, a municipal golf course was created and in the Agronomic farm of Somió, the High School of the Universidad Laboral was built. The old convent of the Clarisas is now the headquarters of the Radiotelevisión del Principado de Asturias. The Hospital of Cabueñes, the municipal morgue, the Scienfic and Technologic Park and the Campus of Gijón, as part of the University of Oviedo, now occupy the former sporting grounds.

The world center of Research and development of the German multinational ThyssenKrupp is located In the northern wing, with a building of about 2,000 m^{2}.

The Universidad Laboral has been used in several films, including those of the Spanish director José Luis Garci, La gran aventura de Mortadelo y Filemón and Fuga de Cerebros, which stood in for Oxford University.
