= Puao =

- Parish
- Interactive map of Puao
- Country: Spain
- Autonomous community: Asturias
- Province: Asturias
- Municipality: Gijón

Population (2016)
  - Total: 215

Puao (Spanish: Poago) is a parish of the municipality of Gijón, in Asturias, Spain.

The population of Fresno was 243 in 2003 and 225 in 2012.

Fresno is one of the smallest districts of Gijón / Xixón. It borders the municipality of Carreño in the west, and with the districts of Fresno and Tremañes in the south.

== Villages and their neighbourhoods ==
Muniello
Pavierna
Zarracina

- Cimavilla
- El Pozón
