= Autovía GJ-81 =

Urban highway in Gijón, Asturias, Spain

Autovía GJ-81
- Autovía del Acero

Route information
- Length: 4 km (2.5 mi)

Major junctions
- From: El Humedal square, Gijón
- To: Serín

Location
- Country: Spain

Highway system
- Highways in Spain; Autopistas and autovías; National Roads

The GJ-81 is an urban highway in Gijón, Asturias, Spain dependent of the Ministry of Public Works and Transport of Spain.

This highway was the beginning of the road that connects Gijón with Oviedo and Avilés, commonly known as "the Y".

Since it was renamed as GJ-81, it works as an entering to the Eastern zone of Gijón from the Southern ring road of the city, integrated in the A-8 highway. It has a traffic radar installed.

GJ-81 also connects Gijón with El Musel and the Aboño Power Plant.
