= Juan Barjola Museum of Painting =

Coordinates: 43°32′40″N 5°39′48″W

- Museo Barjola
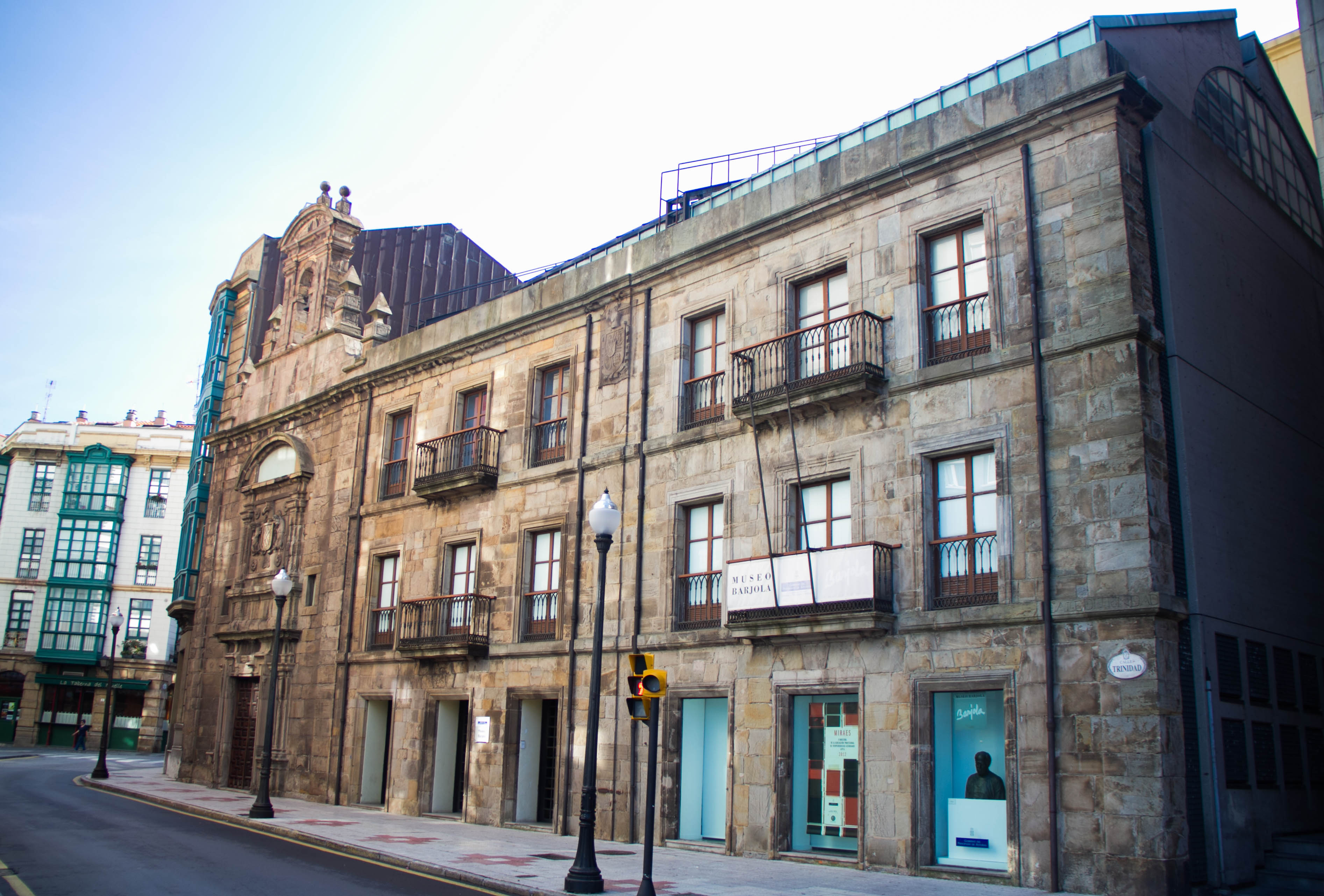
- Established: 1988
- Location: Gijón, Asturias, Spain
- Type: Art museum
- Website: www.museobarjola.es

The Juan Barjola Museum of Painting is a museum located in Gijón, principality of Asturias, Spain. The museum was inaugurated in 1988, after a donation by artist Juan Barjola of 104 works from the years 1950–1988. It is under the auspices of the Cultural Council of the Principality of Asturias. The museum is located in the Trinidad Complex, a four-storied historical building.

== Exhibition ==
The exhibition occupies three of the four stories of the building. The lower floor is for temporary expositions. The exhibition starts on the third floor, with very early works from the 1950s. It continues on the second floor with works from the 1970s, ending on the first floor with paintings from the 1980s.
