= Porceyo =

- Parish
- Interactive map of Porceyo
- Country: Spain
- Autonomous community: Asturias
- Province: Asturias
- Municipality: Gijón

Population (2016)
  - Total: 689

Porceyo is a parish of the municipality of Gijón / Xixón, in Asturias, Spain. Its population was 693 in 2012.

Porceyo borders the districts of Tremañes and Roces in the north, and combines rural, industrial and roadway system areas.

== Villages and its neighbourhoods ==
El Barrio Vega

- La Vegona
- La Veguina

Casares

- Buracos

La Cerca Baxo

- Bareza
- Calacierbes
- El Monte Fano
- La Reguera

La Cerca Riba

- La Robellada
