= L'Abadía Cenero =

- Parish
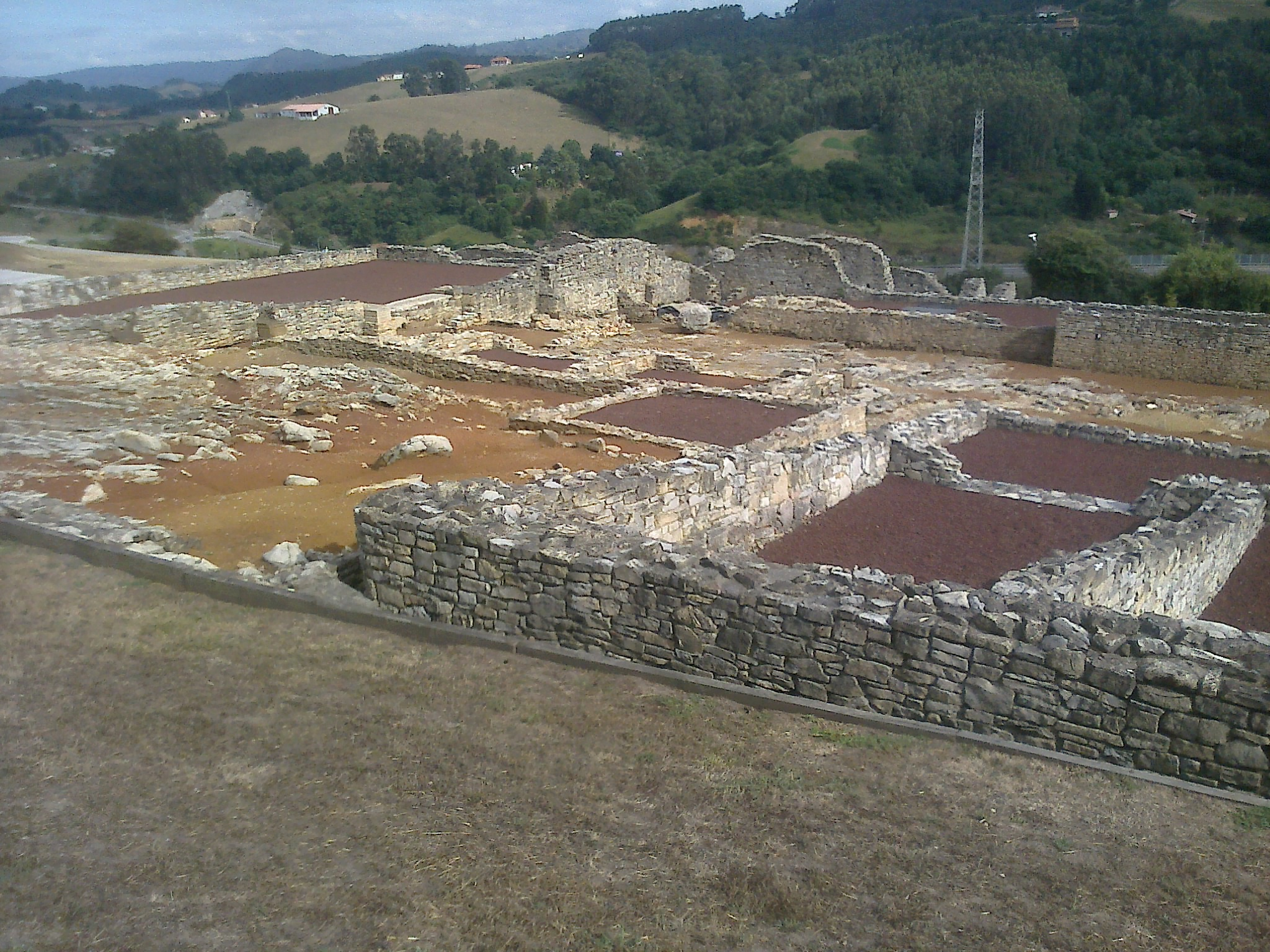
- Roman villa in Veranes

- Location within Spain
- Coordinates: 43°29′13″N 5°44′13″W
- Country: Spain
- Autonomous community: Asturias
- Province: Asturias
- Municipality: Gijón

Population (2016)
  - Total: 1,464

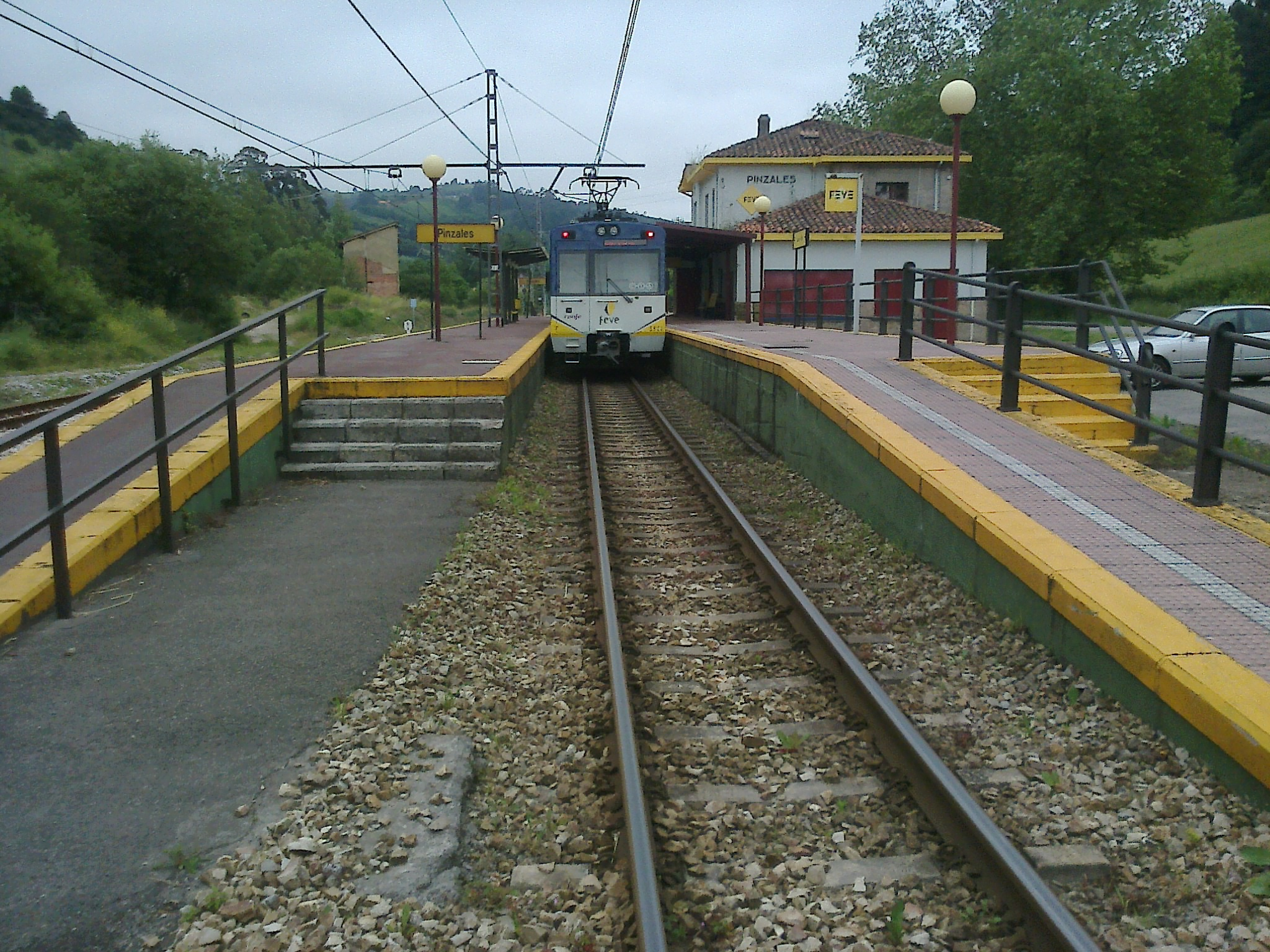
Railway station in Pinzales

L'Abadía Cenero (Spanish: Cenero) is a parish of the municipality of Gijón / Xixón, in Asturias, Spain. Its population was 1,467 in 2012.

The highest point of the parish is the Monte Los Llanos with 279 meters. The lowest one is near the River Pinzales, exiting Cenero, with 16 meters.

L'Abadía Cenero is the biggest district of Gijón / Xixón. Its northern border (close to Tremañes) is heavily industrialized, due to its proximity with Arcelor.

At Veranes, one of the neighbours of L'Abadía Cenero, is located the Roman Villa of Veranes.

== Villages and their neighbourhoods ==
Aguda
Batiao

- El Curuxeo
- El Llavaderu
- Tornallobos
- Troncolleo

Beloño

- Lleme
- Les Muries

Caraveo
Carbaínos

- Casa La Paxarera
- Les Chaboles
- Les Escueles
- La Teyerona

Peñaferruz

- La Casería
- La Quintana los Fombones
- Trespeña

Picún

- Picún de Baxo

Piñera

- La Gola
- Piñera de Baxo
- Piñera de Riba

Riera
La Robellada

- Pinzales

Salceo
Sotiello

- L'Abadía
- Los Caños
- Los Culumbiellos

Trubia
Veranes

- El Caleyu
- La Teyera los Pinares
- La Venta Veranes
