= LABoral Centro de Arte y Creación Industrial =

Spanish exhibition centre

Coordinates: 43°31′30″N 5°36′45″W

- Established: 2007
- Location: Los Prados, 121, Gijón, Spain (Universidad Laboral de Gijón)
- Director: Rosina Gómez-Baeza
- Website: www.laboralcentrodearte.org

LABoral Centro de Arte y Creación Industrial (Art and Industrial Creation Centre) is an exhibition centre in Gijón, Spain, for art, science, technology and advanced visual industries. It is also a venue for artistic and technological production, research investigation and training; and for the dissemination of new forms of art and industrial creation.

The museum's programme of activities mirrors the changes society is undergoing and its immersion in contemporary visual culture.

== Fields of activity ==
- Exhibition: The museums's exhibition programme aspires to become a local, national and international reference for investigation into innovative formats and languages.
- Education/Training: The museum hopes to make up for currently existing deficiencies in the use of new technological media in schools, universities and vocation training, stimulating the participation of the wider community and amateur enthusiasts.
- Research: The museum includes The CREATIC Laboratory, through scholarships for young researchers in the ICT field and making available advanced research infrastructure.
- Creation-production: The museum has a multimedia workshop that produces works of an artistic character and high quality productions in the field of visual industries.
- Public Programme/Mediation: The museum is dedicated to the cultural dissemination of new artistic practices and creative industries, produced principally with or by means of technological media.

Artists whose works have been exhibited at the center include: Aram Bartholl, Aaron Koblin, Ai Weiwei, Martin Parr, Roy Arden, Yael Bartana, Julian Opie among others.

== Publications ==
- Feedback, March 2007
- Gameworld, March 2007
- LAB_Ciberespacios, March 2007
- It's simply beautiful, July 2007
- Playware, September 2007
- Emergentes, November 2007
- banquete_nodos y redes, March 2008
- Homo Ludens Ludens, April 2008
- Nowhere/ Now/ Here, October 2008
- There Is No Road, March 2009
- Auto. Sueño y Materia, May 2009
- Mediateca Expandida. Arcadia, October 2009
- Feedforward. El Ángel de la Historia, October 2009
- Playlist. Mediateca Expandida, December 2009
- El proceso como paradigma, April 2010
- PASAJES. Viajes por el híper-espacio, October 2010
