= CD Basket Mar =

Basket Mar Gijón
- Nickname: BKM
- Leagues: Liga Femenina 2
- Founded: July 2, 1997; 28 years ago
- Dissolved: 2018
- Arena: Pabellón de Deportes La Tejerona
- Capacity: 900
- Location: Gijón, Asturias
- Team colors: Red and white
- President: Francisco Javier García Álvarez
- Head coach: Alberto Fernández Hevia
- Website: basketmar.com
Home	Away

CD Basket Mar Gijón, also known was Ascensores Tresa by sponsorship reasons, was a Spanish women's basketball team based in Gijón, Asturias that played in Liga Femenina 2.

== History ==
Club Basket Mar Gijón was founded in 1997 to replace Unión Scotch Club, that was dissolved. The senior team started playing in the regional league until 2005, when it promoted to Primera Nacional (third tier).

First season (1997–98) played against Colegio Paula Frassinetti (Doroteas), Cosmos, Dados, El Pilar, Juventud Astur (Aucalsa Oviedo), King Rocky, Talleres Marín and Ventura Sport.

On 21 May 2017, Basket Mar promoted to Liga Femenina 2 by winning the promotion stage played in Barañain, Navarre.

However, despite avoiding relegation, the club finally was dissolved and its structure integrated in another local women's basketball team, the Club Deportivo Básico Fomento y Desarrollo del Baloncesto (CDB Fodeba).

== Season by season ==
Season	Tier	Division	Pos.	W–L
2002–03	4	2ª Autonómica	3rd	18–4
2003–04	4	2ª Autonómica		
2004–05	4	2ª Autonómica	2nd	14–2
2005–06	3	1ª Nacional	3rd	22–4
2006–07	3	1ª Nacional	2nd	21–8
2007–08	3	1ª Nacional	8th	14–12
2008–09	3	1ª Nacional	8th	14–12
2009–10	3	1ª Nacional	6th	13–9
2010–11	3	1ª Nacional	5th	15–11
2011–12	3	1ª Nacional	4th	13–11
2012–13	3	1ª Nacional	4th	12–8
2013–14	3	1ª Nacional	7th	11–13
2014–15	3	1ª Nacional	10th	9–15
2015–16	3	1ª Nacional	10th	8–18
2016–17	3	1ª Nacional	1st	24–4
2017–18	2	Liga Femenina 2	11th	8–18

== Youth teams ==
Basket Mar youth teams have stood out at regional level. The under-18 team won the Asturian Championship consecutively from 2013 to 2016. At the 2016 Spanish under-18 Championship, Basket Mar reached the round of 16, where they lost against CB Conquero 45–62. Until 2016, they received the name of Basket Mar-Grupo thanks to an agreement with Real Grupo de Cultura Covadonga.
