= Fresno, Gijón =

Coordinates: 43°31′33″N 5°44′42″W

Fresno
- Parish
- Interactive map of Fresno
- Country: Spain
- Autonomous community: Asturias
- Province: Asturias
- Municipality: Gijón

Population (2016)
  - Total: 552

Fresno is a district (parroquia rural) of the municipality of Gijón / Xixón, in Asturias, Spain.

The population of Fresno was 712 in 2003 and 597 in 2012.

Fresno is a heavily industrialized area of Gijón / Xixón.

== Villages and their neighbourhoods ==
Fresno

- Somonte

Montiana

- Villar
