= Somió =

- Parish
- Flag
- Interactive map of Somió
- Country: Spain
- Autonomous community: Asturias
- Province: Asturias
- Municipality: Gijón

Population (2016)
  - Total: 7,307

Somió is a parish (parroquia rural in Spanish) of the municipality of Gijón / Xixón, in Asturias, Spain.

Civil parishes are the legal subdivisions of the municipalities under the current statute of autonomy of Asturias.

Its population was 6,800 in 2001 and 7,441 in 2012.

Somió is a coastal and residential district which borders the municipality of Villaviciosa in the east.

== Neighborhoods and places ==
Somió nowadays includes 10 neighborhoods (that's the reason for the flag of Somió to have a 10-pointed star):

- Fuexo
- La Pipa
- El Pisón
- La Corolla
- San Llorienzo
- Les Caseríes
- La Redonda
- Fontanía-La Guía
- Foxanes
- Candenal

== Beaches ==
Within the district, there are the following beaches:

- La Ñora
- Estañu
- Serín
- Peñarrubia (nude beach)
- El Rinconín
