= Serín =

- Parish
- Interactive map of Serín
- Country: Spain
- Autonomous community: Asturias
- Province: Asturias
- Municipality: Gijón

Population (2016)
  - Total: 284

Serín is a district (parroquia rural) of the municipality of Gijón / Xixón, in Asturias, Spain.

The population of Serín was 312 in 2012.

Serín is located on the western area of Gijón / Xixón, and borders the Asturian municipalities of Llanera, Corvera and Carreño.

== Villages and its neighbourhoods ==
Arroyo
Bilorteo
Caminllanu

- La Verruga
- El Visu

El Campazón
La Cruciada

- Les Teyeres

L'Espín
Fontanielles
El Gallinal
Liérbado
La Naviella
El Pasquín

- La Granxa

El Peridiellu
La Piñera
Santianes

- La Cirigüeña

El Sisiellu

- La Granxa

Traveseo
El Vallín
La Vega

- Les Páxares
