= Cimavilla =

Neighbourhood in Gijón, Asturias, Spain

Coordinates: 43°32′43″N 5°39′44″W

- Neighbourhood
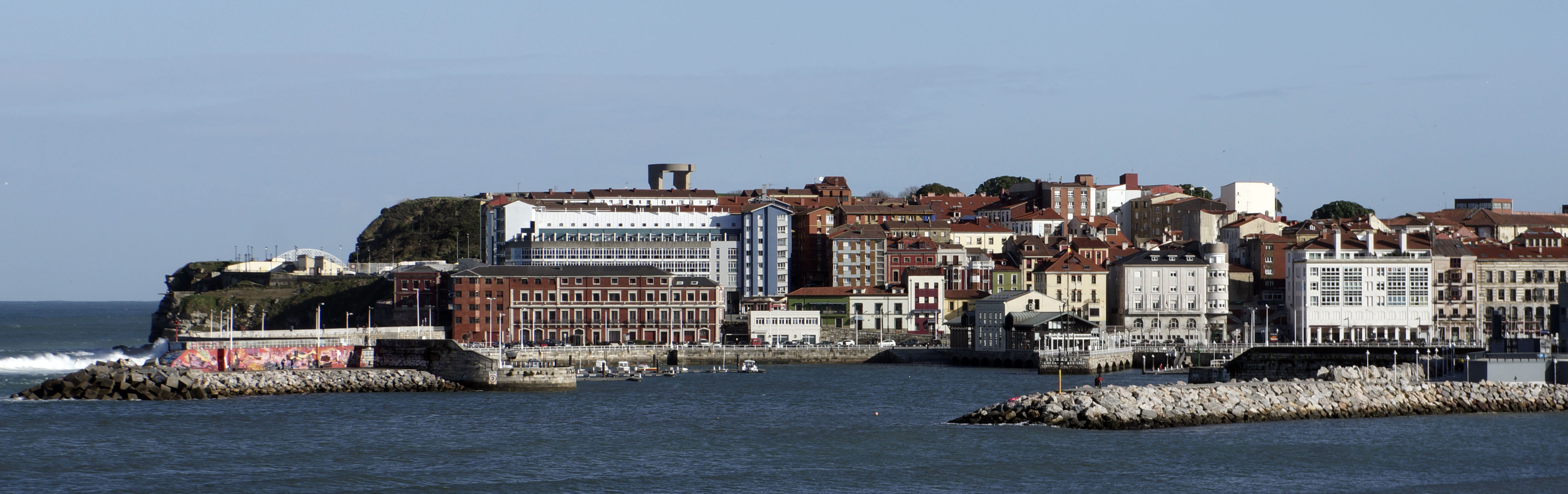
- Skyline of Cimavilla
- Interactive map of Cimavilla
- Country: Spain
- Autonomous community: Asturias
- Province: Asturias
- Municipality: Gijón

Population (2016)
  - Total: 2,714

Cimavilla (Spanish: Cimadevilla) is a neighbourhood of the municipality of Gijón, in Asturias, Spain. Its population was 2,811 in 2012.

Cimavilla is the oldest part of the city, in it there are ruins of the old Roman settlement. In the 16th century, a port is built in the neighbourhood and it converts it in a residential area for sailors and starts the expansion of Gijón to the south.

In the East of Cimavilla is located the Royal Astur Yacht Club, with the first swimming pool of Gijón, built in the first years of the 20th century.

Nowadays, Cimavilla's houses are rehabilitated and the neighbourhood is a residential, commercial and leisure area. At the top of the hill is located the Elogio del Horizonte (Eulogy to the Horizon), built by Eduardo Chillida.

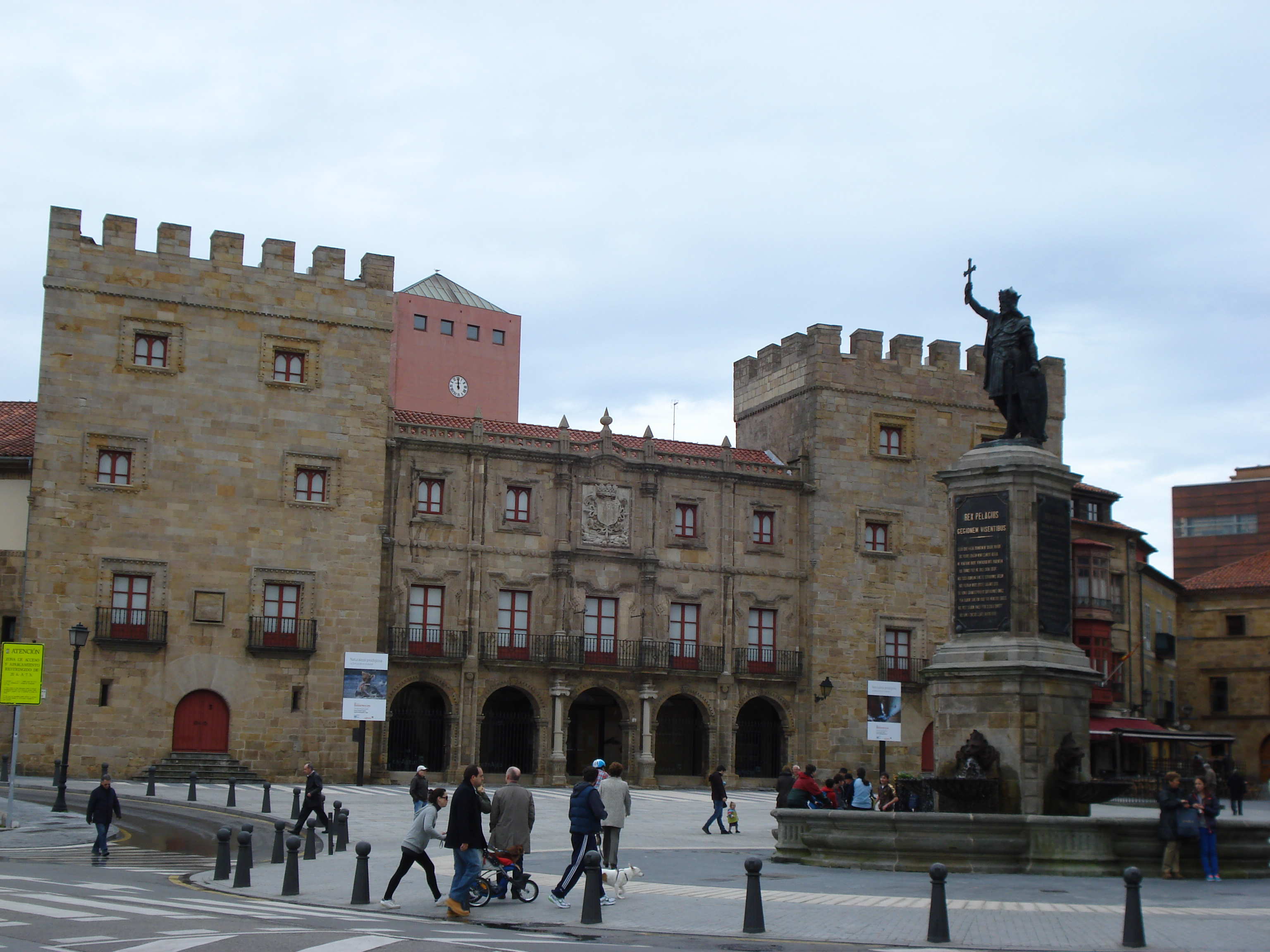
Plaza del Marqués, with the Revillagigedo palace and the Statue of Pelagius.

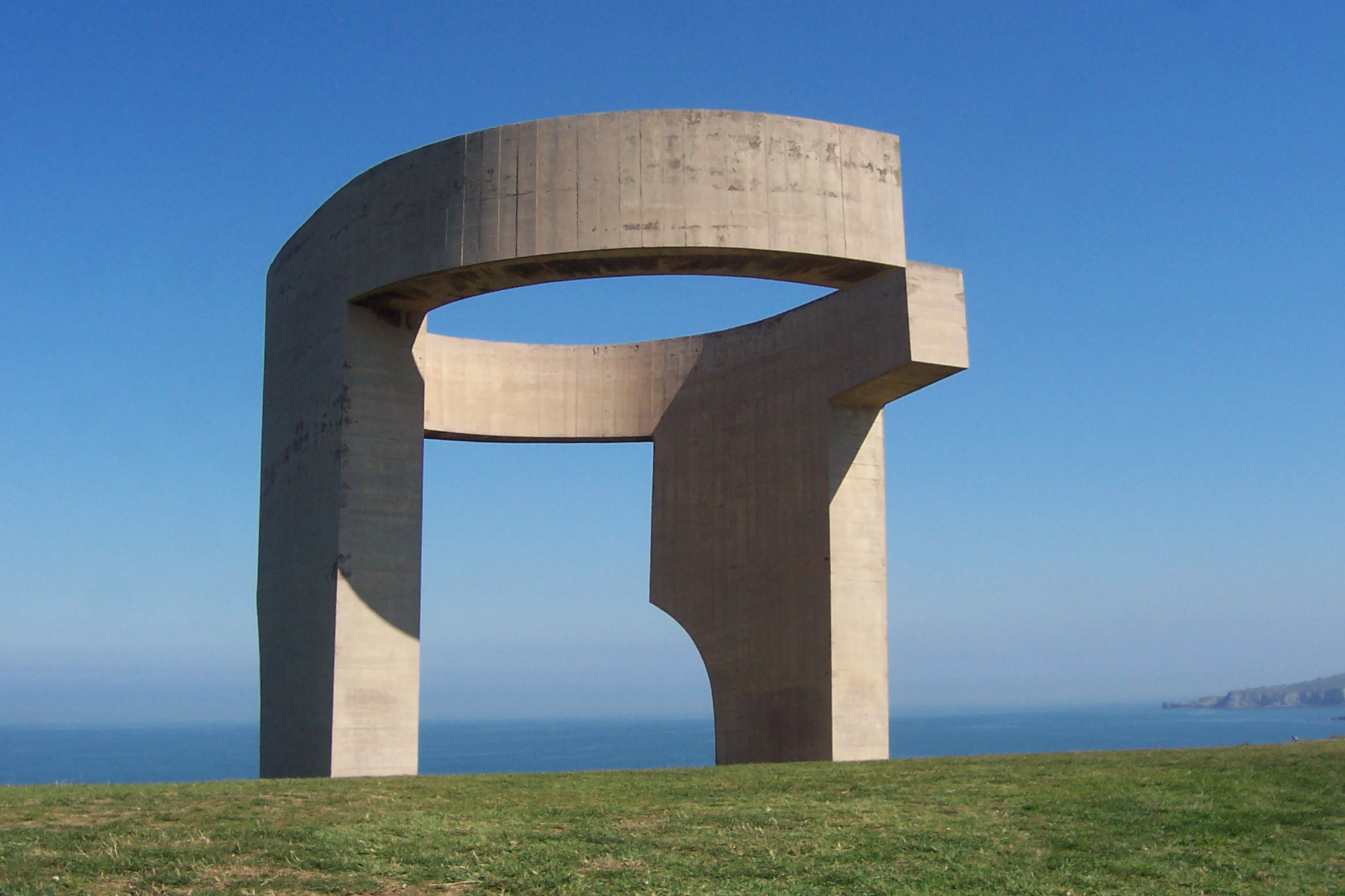
The Eulogy to the Horizon, by Chillida.
