= Prendes =

Prendes is a surname. Notable people with the surname include:

- Alejandro Prendes Reina, Spanish association footballer
- Carlos Prendes, Mexican canoeist
- Eloy José Olaya Prendes, Spanish association footballer
- Evaristo Prendes, Argentine fencer
- Ignacio Prendes, Spanish politician
- Juan Prendes, Cuban handball player
- Juan Díaz Prendes, Spanish association footballer
- Luis Prendes, Spanish actor
- Mercedes Prendes, Spanish actress
- Robin Prendes, American rower
- Sergio Prendes, Spanish association footballer

== See also ==
- Priendes
