= Tremañes =

- Neighbourhood, formerly Parish
- Interactive map of Tremañes
- Country: Spain
- Autonomous community: Asturias
- Province: Asturias
- Municipality: Gijón

Population (2016)
  - Total: 2,535

Tremañes is a neighbourhood of the municipality of Gijón / Xixón, in Asturias, Spain. Previously to be integrated in Gijón, Roces was one of the historical parishes of the city.

Its population was 3,411 in 1994 and decreased to 2,369 in 2012.

An important industrial axis, the district included the Natahoyo area until the 20th century, (nowadays a coastal barrio of the city district). Due to its recent heavy industrialization, Tremañes itself tends to be considered part of the West area of the city district (numbered 7).

== Neighbourhoods and places ==
La Braña

- Nuevo Gijón / La Peral (between La Braña, Pumarín and Les Maravilles)
- El Parrochu
- La Peral
- El Polígono

Los Campones

- El Plano

Lloreda

- Porreza

Les Maravilles
El Natahoyo

- Moreda

La Picota

- El Caravacu
- La Muria
- La Quintana

Pumarín

- L'Alto Pumarín
- Les Mil Quinientes
- Perchera

Santolaya
La Torre

- El Mortero
- El Poblao de Santa Bárbara

La Xuvería

- Les Cases de Pinón
- El Pontón
