= List of dams and reservoirs in Asturias =

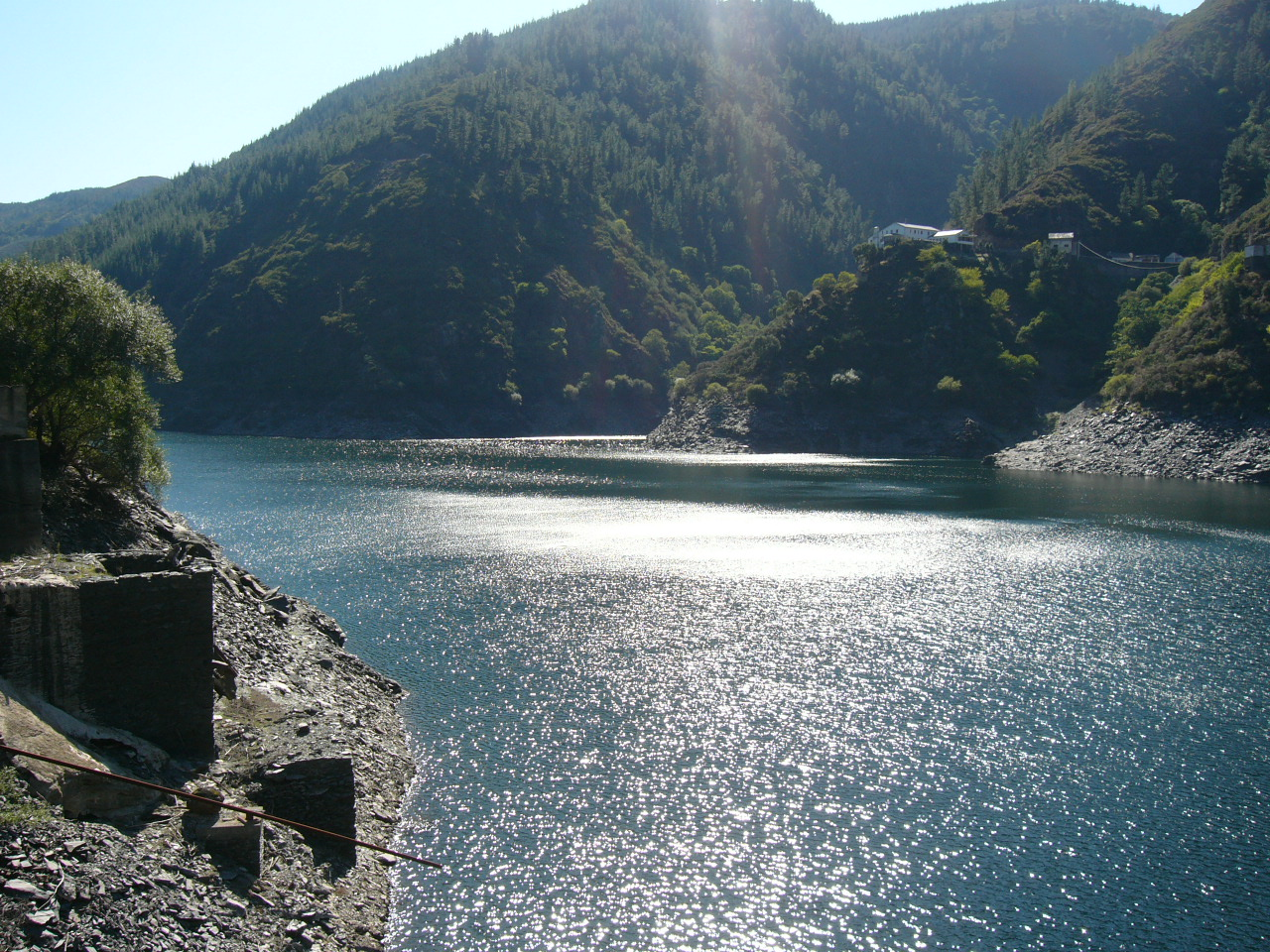
Embalse de Salime

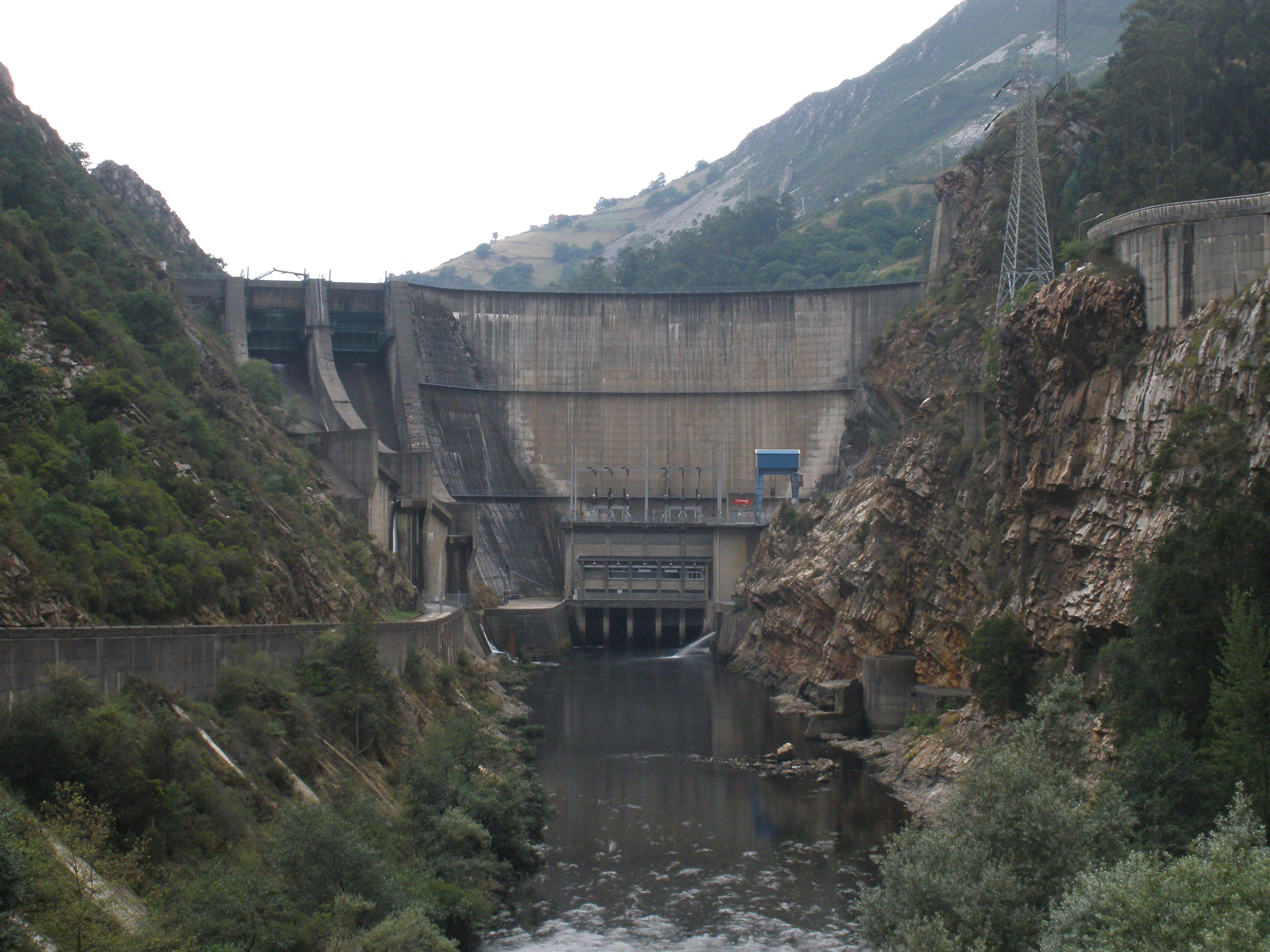
La Barca dam

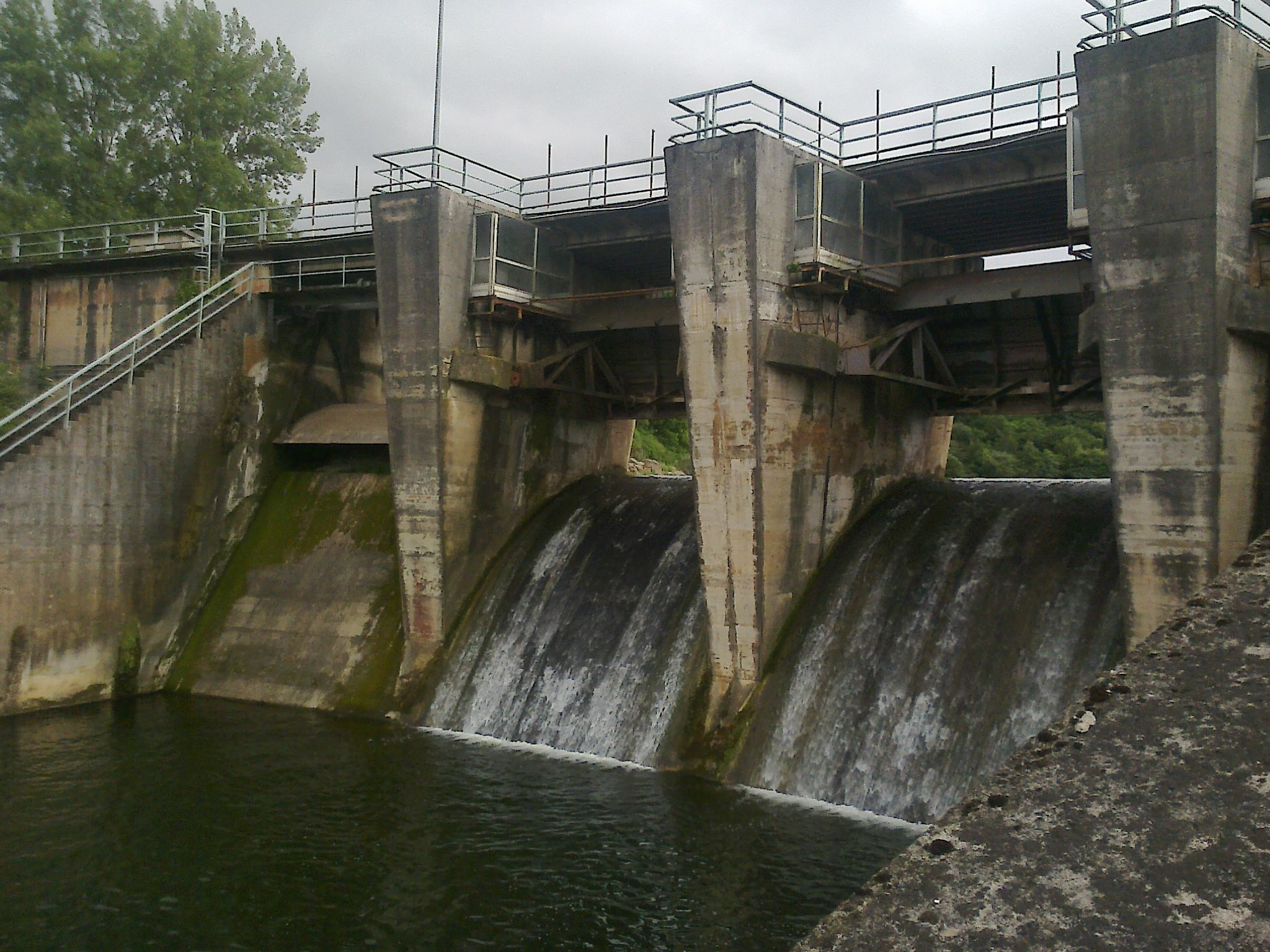
San Andrés de los Tacones dam

This is a list of dams and reservoirs in Asturias, Spain.

Reservoir	Basin	Location	Type	Height (m)	Length along the top (m)	Drainage basin (km^{2})	Reservoir surface (ha)	Volume (hm^{3})
Alfilorios	Barrea	Ribera de Arriba	Embankment	67.0	171.7	4.09	52.0	9.140
Arbón	Navia	Coaña, Villayón	Embankment	35.0	180.0	2443.0	270.0	38.20
Barca, La	Narcea	Belmonte, Tineo	Arch	73.5	178.0	1216.0	194.0	31.10
Doiras	Navia	Boal	Arch-gravity	90.0	165.0	2288.0	347.0	114.60
Florida, La	Narcea	Tineo	Gravity	19.0	70.0	1005.0	18.40	0.75
Furacón, El	Nalón	Trubia (Oviedo)	Gravity	14.0	70.0	2180.0	19.0	0.522
Granda, La	Granda	Gozón	Embankment	23.7	270.0	1.25	32.50	3.208
Jocica, La	Dobra	Amieva	Arch	87.0	66.0	39.0	6.14	0.4
Mortera, La	Mortera	Morcín	Gravity	8.0	91.0	0.0	0.0	0.017
Priañes	Nora	Oviedo, Las Regueras	Gravity	27.0	50.0	340.0	35.17	1.9
Rioseco	Nalón	Sobrescobio	Gravity	28.5	101.0	337.0	63.0	3.72
Saliencia	Saliencia	Somiedo	Gravity	20.0	33.0	48.0	0.30	0.02
Salime	Navia	Grandas de Salime	Gravity	125.67	250.0	1806.0	685.0	266.30
San Andrés Tacones	Aboño	S.A. Tacones (Gijón)	Embankment	22.0	434.0	37.5	4.0	71.0
Somiedo	Somiedo	Somiedo	Gravity	24.0	18.0	82.0	0.29	0.018
Tanes	Nalón	Caso, Sobrescobio	Gravity	95.0	195.0	271.0	159.0	33.27
Trasona	Alvares	Trasona (Corvera)	Gravity	16.0	332.0	37.0	61.0	4.1
Valdemurio	Trubia	Quirós	Gravity	40.15	119.0	196.0	1.43	1.43
Valduno II	Nalón	Las Regueras	Gravity	9.9	105.0	2500.0	34.36	0.3
Valle	Valle	Somiedo	Gravity	12.5	52.8	39.0	23.7	3.7
Valle II	Valle	Somiedo	Gravity	16.0	409.0	5.6	2.0	2.45

== See also ==
- List of dams and reservoirs
- List of dams and reservoirs in Spain
