= Suko =

Suko may refer to:

- Emperor Sukō (1334–1398), Japanese emperor
- Ismail Suko (1932–2011), Indonesian politician and civil servant
- Lonny R. Suko (born 1943), United States district judge
- Suko Castle, ruins of a castle structure in Shiroishi, Saga Prefecture, Japan
- Feliceni (Sükő in Hungarian), a village in Romania

== See also ==
- Suco (disambiguation)
