= Trasona Reservoir =

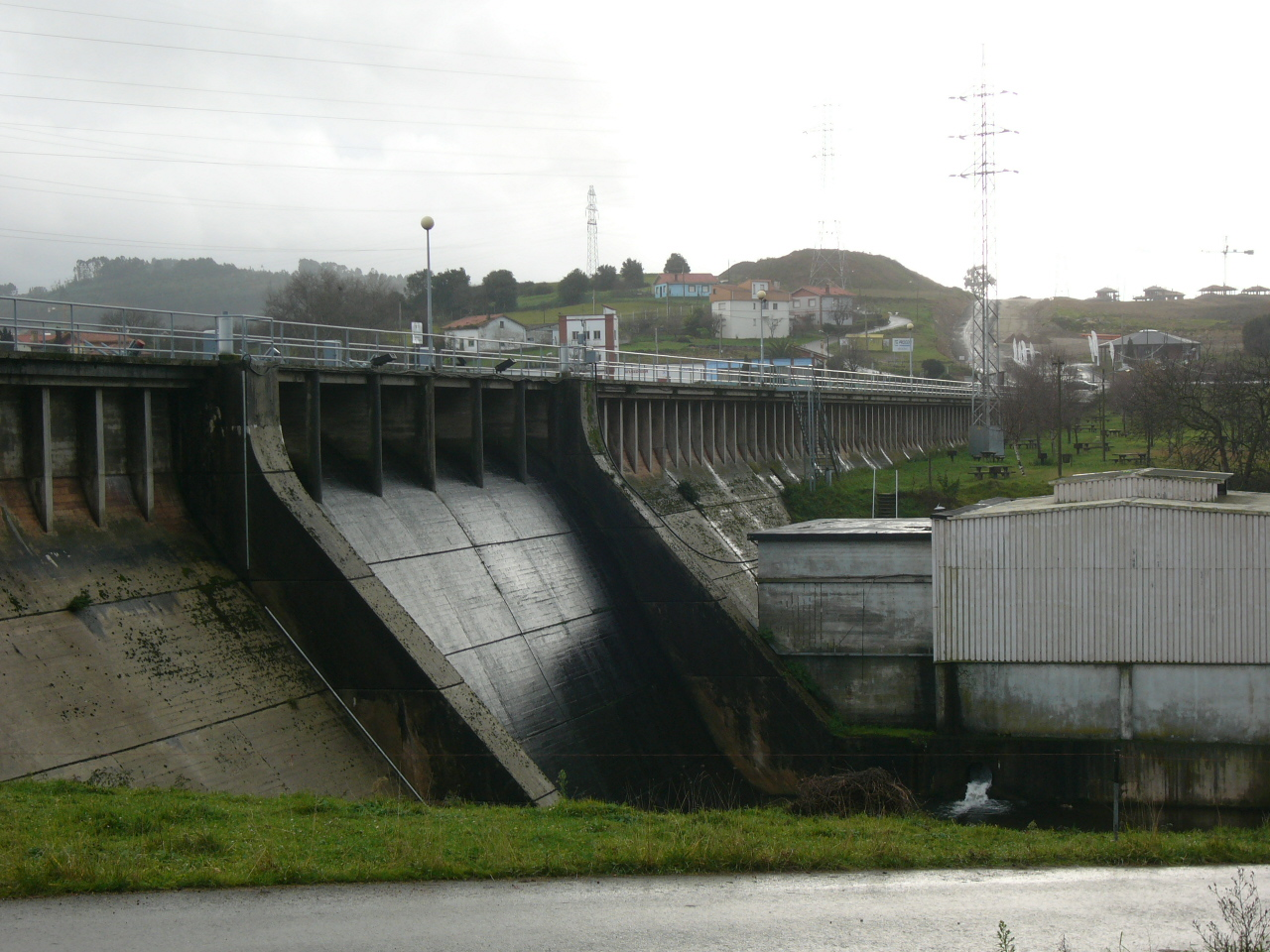
- View of the dam

- Location of the Trasona reservoir in Asturias
- Country: Spain
- Location: Trasona, Corvera, Asturias
- Coordinates: 43°32′48″N 5°52′42″W
- Opening date: 1957
- Owner: Arcelor

Dam and spillways
- Type of dam: Gravity dam
- Impounds: Alvares River
- Height: 16 m (52 ft)
- Length: 332 m (1,089 ft)
- Dam volume: 31,000 m^{3} (41,000 yd^{3})
- Spillways: 1 main
- Spillway capacity: 45 m^{3}/s (1,600 cu ft/s)

Reservoir
- Creates: Embalse de Trasona
- Total capacity: 4.1 hm^{3} (3,300 acre⋅ft)
- Catchment area: 37 km^{2} (14 sq mi)
- Surface area: 61 ha (150 acres)

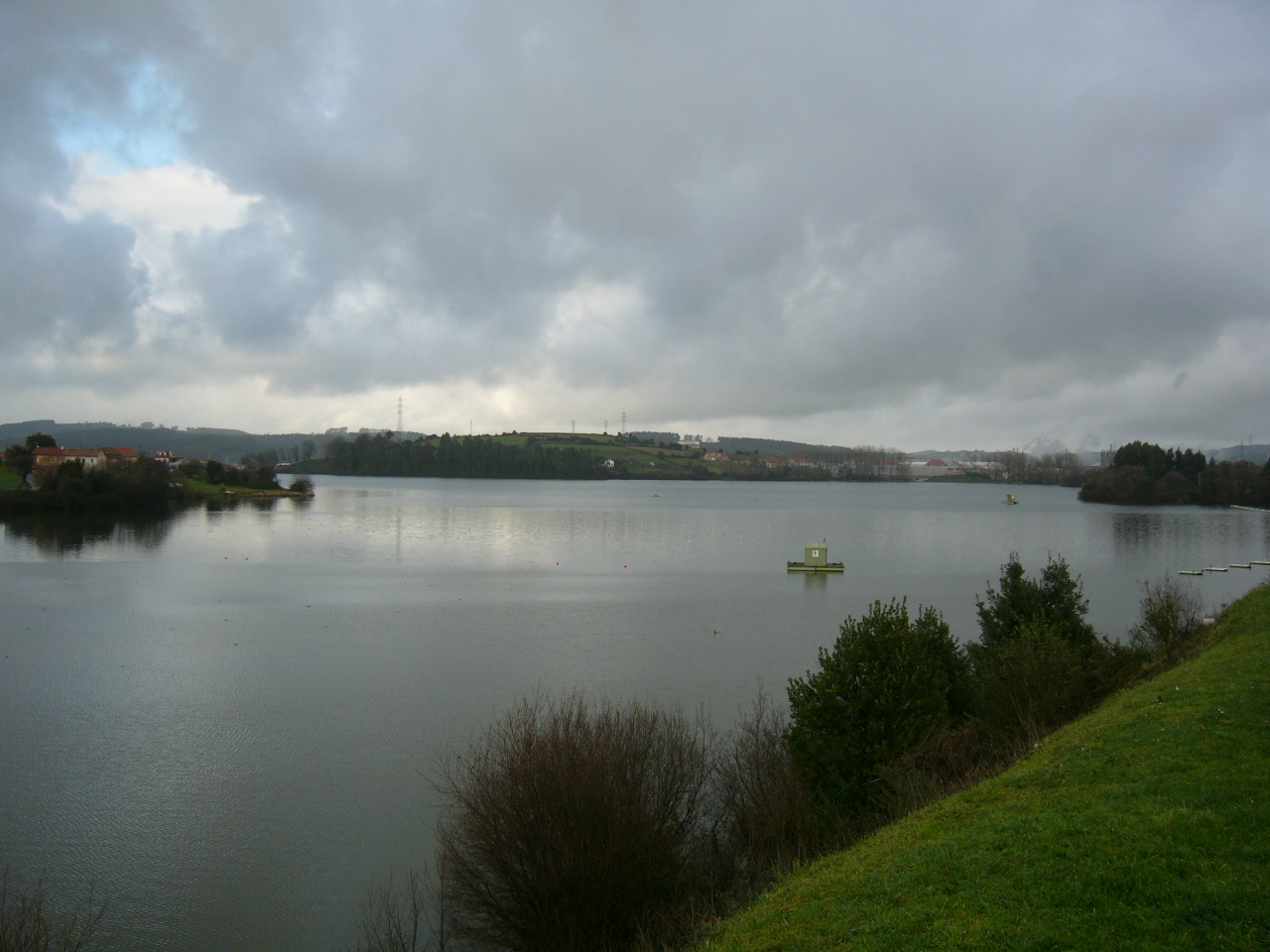
Reservoir of Trasona

The Trasona Reservoir (Spanish: Embalse de Trasona) is a reservoir in Asturias, Spain across the Alvares River. It is located in the parish of Trasona, in the municipality of Corvera de Asturias.

The reservoir is property of Arcelor. Its construction was finished in 1957, with the aim of supply water to the steel plant located in Avilés and to the population of the zone. It is also used for sporting purposes. Near the reservoir are located sporting facilities for canoeing. This facilities were improved in 2010 for hosting the Canoe Sprint European Championships.

The reservoir is supplied by the rivers Alvares and Narcea, from this last one thank to the Canal del Narcea, a 27 km channel.
