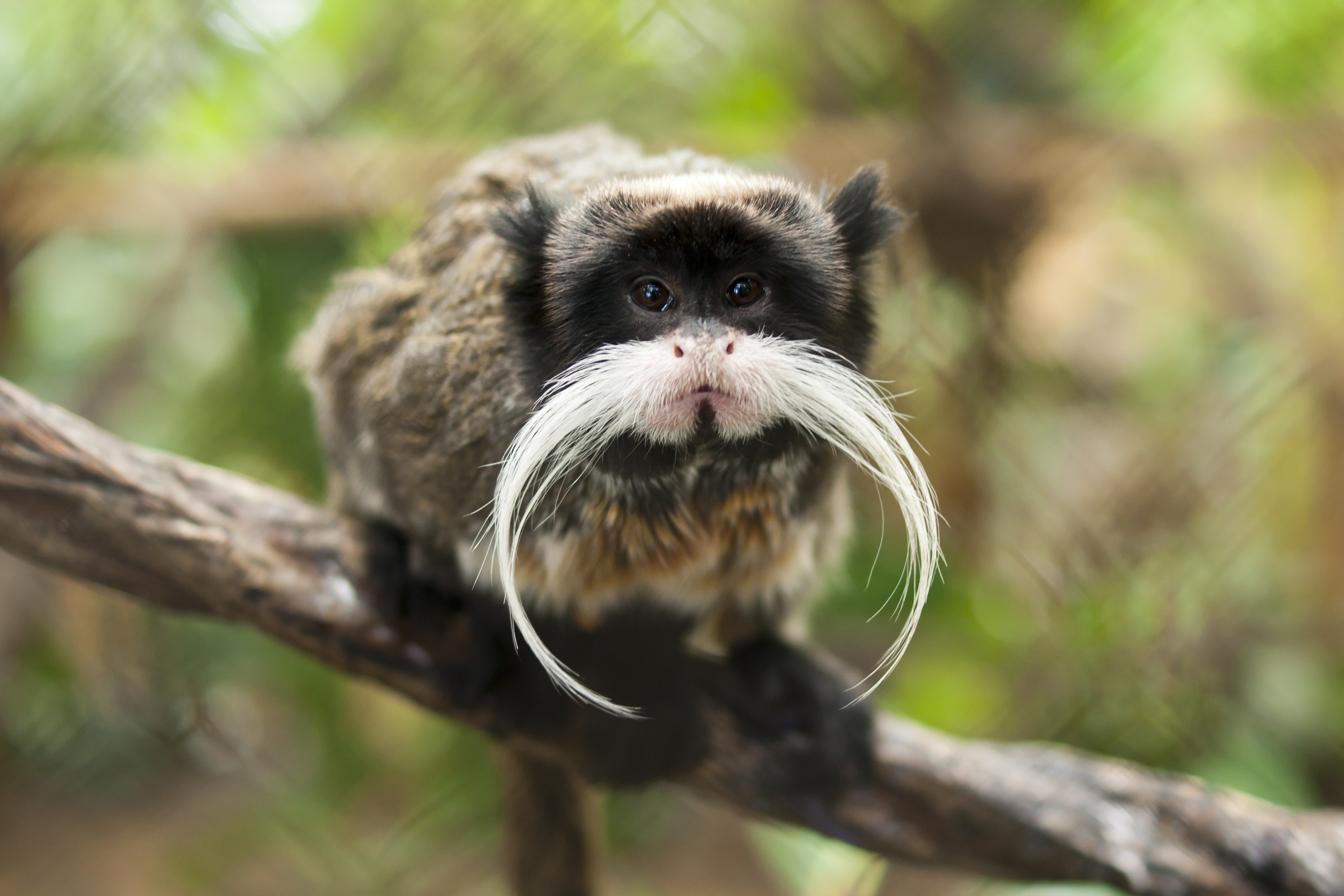

Conservation status
- Least Concern (IUCN 3.1)

Scientific classification
- Kingdom: Animalia
- Phylum: Chordata
- Class: Mammalia
- Order: Primates
- Family: Callitrichidae
- Genus: Saguinus
- Species: S. imperator
- Subspecies: S. i. imperator

Trinomial name
- Saguinus imperator imperator (Goeldi, 1907)

= Black-chinned emperor tamarin =

Subspecies of New World monkey

The black-chinned emperor tamarin (Saguinus imperator imperator) is one of the two subspecies of the emperor tamarin. Unlike the bearded emperor tamarin, it has no beard. It is distributed throughout the rainforests of Brazil, Peru, and Bolivia. Not much on its conservation is known, so it is listed as Data Deficient by the IUCN. After a gestation period of 140–145 days, females usually give birth to one or two young. It is the same size as the emperor tamarin and it eats almost the same food: bugs, spiders, fruit, tree sap, and nectar.
