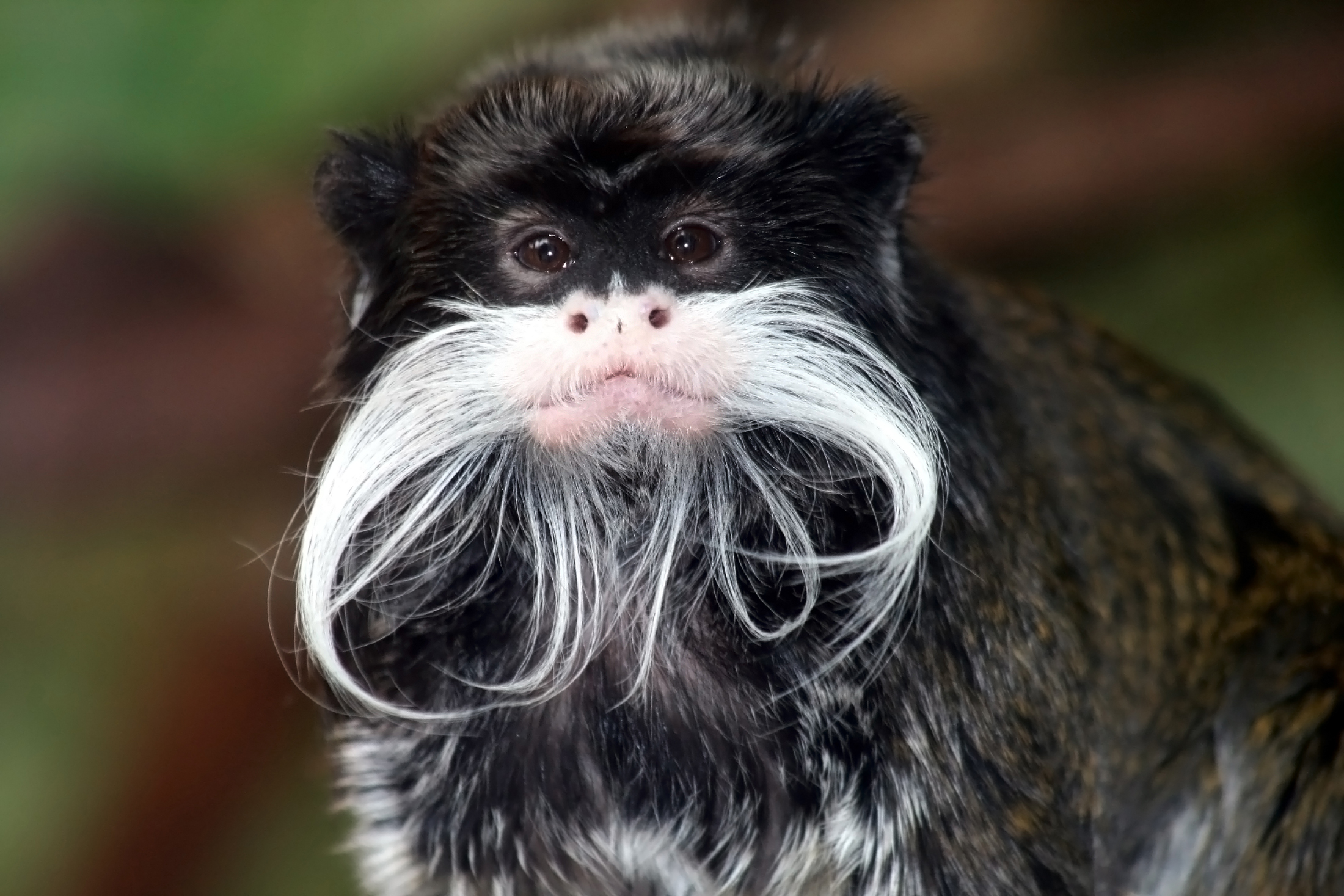
- S. i. subgrisescens at San Francisco Zoo
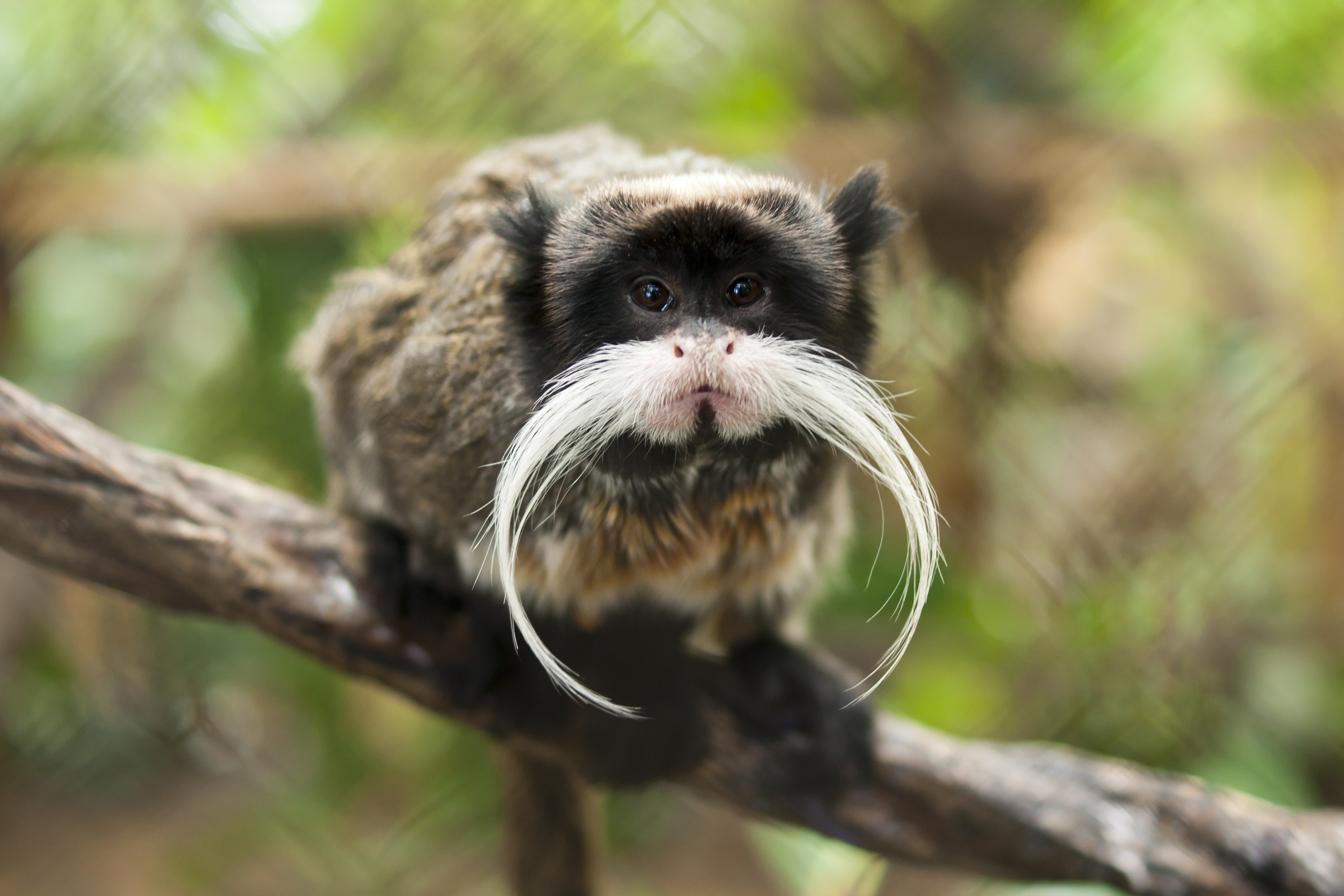
- S. i. imperator at Dallas World Aquarium

Conservation status
- Least Concern (IUCN 3.1)

Scientific classification
- Kingdom: Animalia
- Phylum: Chordata
- Class: Mammalia
- Order: Primates
- Family: Callitrichidae
- Genus: Saguinus
- Species: S. imperator

Binomial name
- Saguinus imperator (Goeldi, 1907)

Subspecies
- S. i. imperator; S. i. subgrisecens
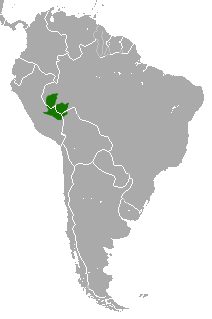
- Range of the emperor tamarin

= Emperor tamarin =

Species of New World monkey

The emperor tamarin (Saguinus imperator) is a species of tamarin monkey allegedly named for its beard's resemblance to that of the German emperor Wilhelm II. It lives in the north Brazilian states of Acre and Amazonas and the southwest Amazon Basin, in east Peru, north Bolivia.

The fur of the emperor tamarin is predominantly grey colored, with yellowish speckles on its chest. The hands and feet are black and the tail is brown. Outstanding is its long, white beard, which extends to both sides beyond the shoulders. The animal reaches a length of 23–26 centimetres (9–10 in), plus a 35–41.5 cm (13.8–16.3 in) long tail. It weighs approximately 500 grams (18 oz).

== Physical description ==
Saguinus imperator in Singapore Zoo

There are claws on each of the animal's toes and fingers, aside from its big toe, which has a nail. While it has a definitive long mustache, it also has almost inconspicuous white hairs on its chin. The hair on its chest and belly are a mixture of red, orange, and white hairs. On its back, the fur is dark brown. The inner side of its arms and legs are an orange-like color.

They are very small, compared to most other primates. Using their claws, they cling to tree branches, maintaining a consistent verticality in the jungle environment. To navigate their lush environment, which typically is in rainforests, they leap and move quickly through trees, rarely touching the forest floor.

== Subspecies ==
Two subspecies are currently recognized, the black-chinned emperor tamarin (Saguinus imperator imperator) and the bearded emperor tamarin (Saguinus imperator subgrisecens). Of the two subspecies, S. i. subgriscens is more varied in color on its chest, belly, and arms. Also, in addition to its long white mustache, this subspecies has a prominent white-haired beard, unlike S. i. imperator, which merely has faint black whiskers upon its chin.

Aside from these slight variations in color and visually-striking beards, both subspecies essentially have the same body structure.

== Habitat ==
Emperor tamarins occur mostly in Amazonian lowland and lower mountain rain forests, as well as remnant, primary, and secondary forests. Amazonian lowland holds an abundance of water during high sea level due to the flooding by nearby water sources. This contributes to a very humid, tropical climate to occur year-round. The lower montane forests Emperor tamarins are primarily found in are considered tropical and moist with an abundance of vegetation. During the dry season, flowering peaks and in the wet season, flowering decreases, affecting the diets of the Emperor tamarins. Many Emperor tamarins are found in Amazonian secondary forests, which account for 40% of the forest area. Secondary forests appear to accumulate woody plant species at a relatively rapid rate but the mechanisms involved are complex and no clear pattern emerged. This process helped grow the trees in which Emperor tamarins primarily reside in when found in secondary forests. The average size of the group tamarins live in is two to eight individuals, but it can range from four to eighteen. They reside in the form of an extended family group, usually with only one breeding female. The groups they live in usually only consist of Emperor tamarins, but occasionally can also include saddle-back tamarins considering their food scavenging groups often join together. This is due to the fact Emperor tamarins tend to stay higher in the canopy than 10 metres (33 ft), and saddle-back tamarins usually stay below 10 metres.

Emperor tamarins consume a wide range of specimens in their daily dietary routine. They eat fruits and flowers, many of which are readily available due to their flourishing vegetational habitats. They also eat the exudes of plants such as gums and saps, easily gouged from the trees they are living in. Many also choose to consume animal prey, such as insects and frogs, depending upon what type of forest they are located in. Emperor tamarins have been reported to engage in mixed species associations with Weddell's saddle-back tamarins (S. fuscicollis weddelli), spending up to 20% of their day foraging in these mixed species troops. Emperor tamarin society is based on a dominance hierarchy led by a dominant female and her mate. It is the dominant emperor tamarins who form these foraging troops, forming these mixed species groups is beneficial to the emperor tamarins and their ability to find quality food resources. Some speculated at one point that females of the species were the primary scavengers of food, specifically fruit and flowers, because of their enhanced abilities over the males in the form of stronger visual cues. Upon research, it was found that males and females possess the same abilities to locate food patches. Though it does not discriminate between the two species, females do tend to be the more dominant hunters, which led to the speculation. Weddell's saddle-back tamarins are better and faster at locating food resources. S. fuscicollis are a smaller bodied species of tamarins and are able to move fast through the canopy, saddle-back tamarins often arrive to the food resources before the emperor tamarins. The emperor tamarins follow the saddle-back tamarins to food patches using their larger size to intimidate the feeding Weddell's saddle-back tamarins into leaving the feeding tree. This foraging strategy is beneficial to both species, the mixed species troops provide more vigilance for predator protection. Observations of tamarins foraging in mixed species troops using feeding platforms and monitoring fruiting trees show that these troops spend less time foraging in smaller patches of fruiting trees with limited amounts of fruiting resources.

== Reproduction and infant care ==
The age of first reproduction in emperor tamarins is around 16–20 months old, with a gestation period of up to 6 months. Tamarins are seasonal breeders. Breeding is based around food availability. Most births occur during the wet season when food resources are in abundance.

Tamarin species were once thought to be a monogamous species, but observations of emperor tamarins in the wild show that they have a polyandrous mating system, with one dominant female mating with multiple males. This mating system works to ensure paternal investment in offspring. If a female mates with multiple males and give birth to a litter, males are more likely to invest because of the possibility that one of the infants will carry their genes onto the next generation. Due to high rates of twinning or multiple births in Emperor tamarins, parental care and paternal investment is important to infant survival. Previously the only knowledge of tamarin infant care came from captive studies on cotton-top tamarins (S. oedipus), which demonstrated that infant survival is dependent on helpers. Helpers are either older female offspring of the dominant female that have remained in their natal group or the males that most frequently interact with the dominant female. Infant carrying has a high energetic cost due to the relatively large fetal weight of infants to the weight of adults. Helpers provide the extra support to remove some of the cost of caring for multiple infants. Male emperor tamarins have been observed to spend the most time with infants, often carrying both infants while the dominant female forages. Male emperor tamarins are reported to be more observant of the infants and more protective. For example, they are known to react faster to infant distress calls than females.

Infant mortality in the wild is at its highest during weeks 5–15 of their lives, when they begin to move around and explore on their own, this is because one of the greatest threats to infant survival is falling from the canopy.

== Distribution ==
The emperor tamarin can be found in Brazil; places in Peru and Bolivia that are parts of the southwest Amazon Basin; east of the upper Purus river; between the Purus river and Rio Acre; east of the upper Juruá River to the Tarauacá River and Jurupari River; west to the Urubamba River and Inajá River; and south of Tahuamanu River.

According to Buchanan's research, the subspecies of S. imperator, S. i. imperator, are rarely found in Los Campos and Buena Vista, which are located near the left bank of the Rio Acre; and in the banks of the Purus River and Eiru River.

Lastly, according to Buchanan and Bairrao, the subspecies, S. i. subgrisescens, can be found on the upper banks of the Juruá River; south of the Tahuamanú river and along the banks of the Muyumanu river.

== Behavior ==
Emperor tamarins behave actively, rapidly, gracefully, gregariously, and playfully in the wild. In captivity the tamarins are very social and interactive with humans. A study by Knox, Kerry L. and Donald Stone Sade of the social behavior of emperor tamarins in captivity found that tamarin colonies behave agonistically according to seniority. There is an agonistic network where each component along a continuum from strongly dominant individuals interaction with strongly subordinate individuals. In the interactions the tamarins usually communicate threat and submission. The aggression is more frequently among individuals of the same sex, most frequently between juvenile males and juvenile males, between juvenile females and juvenile females and also between sexed twins. There are matrices of within family groups of emperor tamarins where a large proportion of the total number of agonistic interaction within a group occurs between pairs of siblings from different litters. The dynamics of agonistic relations within a group is not just only for the status of the breeding pair but may also influence the allocation of reproductive effort. Family members other than the breeding female may suppress reproduction in adult daughters too. There are certain behaviors that were identified as dominant and some responses as subordinate.

Communication is a key behavior, a facilitation of cohesion and coordination among group-living tamarins. There was also an agonistic interaction with saddle back tamarins and emperors, where the emperor tamarins were the dominant species. The long call is the most likely call in the tamarin vocal repertoire to serve as a coordinating signal. Long call vocalization has been hypothesized to serve as communicative signals both within and between Tamarin species. Long calls are usually quite loud and can be hear by humans over 150 m (490 ft) away. Emperor tamarins often produce long call upon leaving their sleeping sites at the morning and then periodically throughout the day, especially when traveling or participating in territorial encounters with neighbor tamarin groups. Long calls promote contact between neighbor tamarin groups. Long calls also function as interspecific signals consisting of counter-calling between heterospecific groups that travel together or approach another after period separations throughout the day. Emperor tamarin long calls generally cover a broader frequency range and the notes are shorter and repeated more quickly than those produced by saddle back tamarins. The acoustical differences between saddle back and emperor tamarin calls allow humans to differentiate between them easily. Tamarins are able to identify the sex of unfamiliar callers too. Emperor tamarins respond in high rates of to the calls from conspecific and heterospecific species calls but not that much to polyspecific species calls. Emperor tamarins displayed higher frequencies of approach towards the speaking following playback of tamarin long calls. Communication between tamarin species via long calls included high vocalization rates before reinitiating contact in the morning and during travel when two groups may become separated. Individuals also call at high rates in the morning and during travel when they are with another tamarin and when they are alone. They call the groups simultaneously. The calls are an exchange has the potential to act as a proximate mechanism facilitating coordination, both within conspecific tamarin and heterospecific tamarin. Sometimes tamarins consider the broadcast of calls as a challenge to their territory against intruders. Counter-calling between species represents interspecific communication in polyspecific tamarin associations. Emperor tamarins distinguish between calls on the basis of social relationships.

The emperor tamarin forms mixed-species troops with Weddell's saddle-back tamarin and also associates with Goeldi's marmoset.

== Conservation ==
Emperor tamarins are listed by the International Union for Conservation of Nature (IUCN) as a species of Least Concern, and there are no conservation efforts aimed directly towards this species of primates. Emperor tamarins populations have been in decline due to threats of deforestation and human encroachment. Forest fragmentation has become a huge problem for arboreal primate species in the neotropics: fragmentation causes the tamarins range to be restricted, causing populations to be isolated. Emperor tamarins are located in protected areas in Peru at Manú National Park and Bolivia at Manuripi-Heath Amazonian Wildlife National Reserve. There are no protected areas that overlap with the Brazilian populations of emperor tamarins.

Manú National Park in Peru provides protection of the natural habitat of the emperor tamarins. This national park is considered to be one of the world's most important protected areas because of it being located within one of the largest biodiversity hotspots and its high species richness. The National Park is home to small populations of indigenous people, these indigenous people are permitted to hunt in the park. Research shows that indigenous subsistence hunting has effects on the larger bodied primates in the park but shows minimal effects on the emperor tamarin population size. There is evidence that hunting has extended the range of emperor tamarins which originally were restricted to the north bank of the Manú River are also now found on the south bank. Manú National Park had a successful community based ecotourism industry, and in recent years ecotourism has increased as Park administration and NGOs have taken interest in improving the livelihoods of the indigenous populations. Though there is cause for concern that improving the livelihoods and infrastructure of the national park may lead to negative effects on the wildlife populations including the emperor tamarins.

== Human interactions ==
Many zoos observe interesting behaviors of Emperor tamarins held in captivity. According to staff at the Jackson Zoo in Jackson, Mississippi, their Emperor tamarins display a need for tenderness. Staff at San Francisco Zoo have reported that the species takes part in mutual grooming.
