= Grupo Fertiberia =

Spanish business conglomerate

- Formation: 1995
- Headquarters: Madrid, Spain
- Products: Fertilizers
- Fields: Chemistry
- Staff: 1,400

Group Fertiberia (in English: Fertiberia Group) is a Spanish business conglomerate in the chemical industry. It has been operating since 1995 and has its origins in the historical company Fertiberia, whose activities have expanded throughout Spain, France and Portugal. Today, the group is one of the leading producers of fertilizers, ammonia and its byproducts in the European Union.

== History ==
In 1995, the Villar Mir Group took control of the assets of Fesa-Enfersa, which would form the basis for the re-foundation of the historic company Fertiberia. After a period of internal reorganization, which included plant closures and workforce reductions, Fertiberia began a period of expansion. This strategy included the creation of several subsidiary companies and the acquisition of other companies in the sector, such as Sefanitro, ASUR, Química del Estroncio, Fercampo, etc. This has led to Grupo Fertiberia being considered “the leading company in the fertilizer sector in Spain”, although its presence has subsequently extended to Portugal and France. In 2020, the Swedish-German group Triton Partners took control of Grupo Fertiberia.

== Affiliates ==
Subsidiaries	% owned	Main product	Headquarters
Fertiberia	100%	Fertilizers and industrial products	Madrid
Fertiberia la Mancha	100%	Fertilizers, agricultural products	Motilla del Palancar
Fertiberia Castilla y León	100%	Fertilizers, agricultural products	Tordesillas
Fertiberia France	100%	Fertilizers and industrial products	Lieusaint
Fercampo	100%	Fertilizers, pesticides, seeds	Málaga
Agralia Fertilizantes	100%	Fertilizers and industrial products	Altorricón
ADP Fertilizantes	100%	Fertilizers and industrial products	Alverca do Ribatejo
Intergal Española	100%	Fertilizers and industrial products	Madrid
Química del Estroncio	100%	Strontium and byproducts	Cartagena
2F Ouest	100%	Fertilizers and industrial products	L'Hermitage
