= Suco =

Suco or SUCO may refer to:

== Geography ==
- Sucos of Timor-Leste, a village-level designation
- Acoma Pueblo, a Native American village in New Mexico sometimes referred to as Suco in historical documents
- El Suco, a village in Villa parish, Asturias, Spain

== People ==
- Suco (footballer), Spanish footballer Andrés Parada Alvite (1938–2026)
- Sarah Suco (born 1981), French actress

== SUCO ==
- State University of New York at Oneonta

== See also ==
- Suko (disambiguation)
