= San Andrés de los Tacones Reservoir =

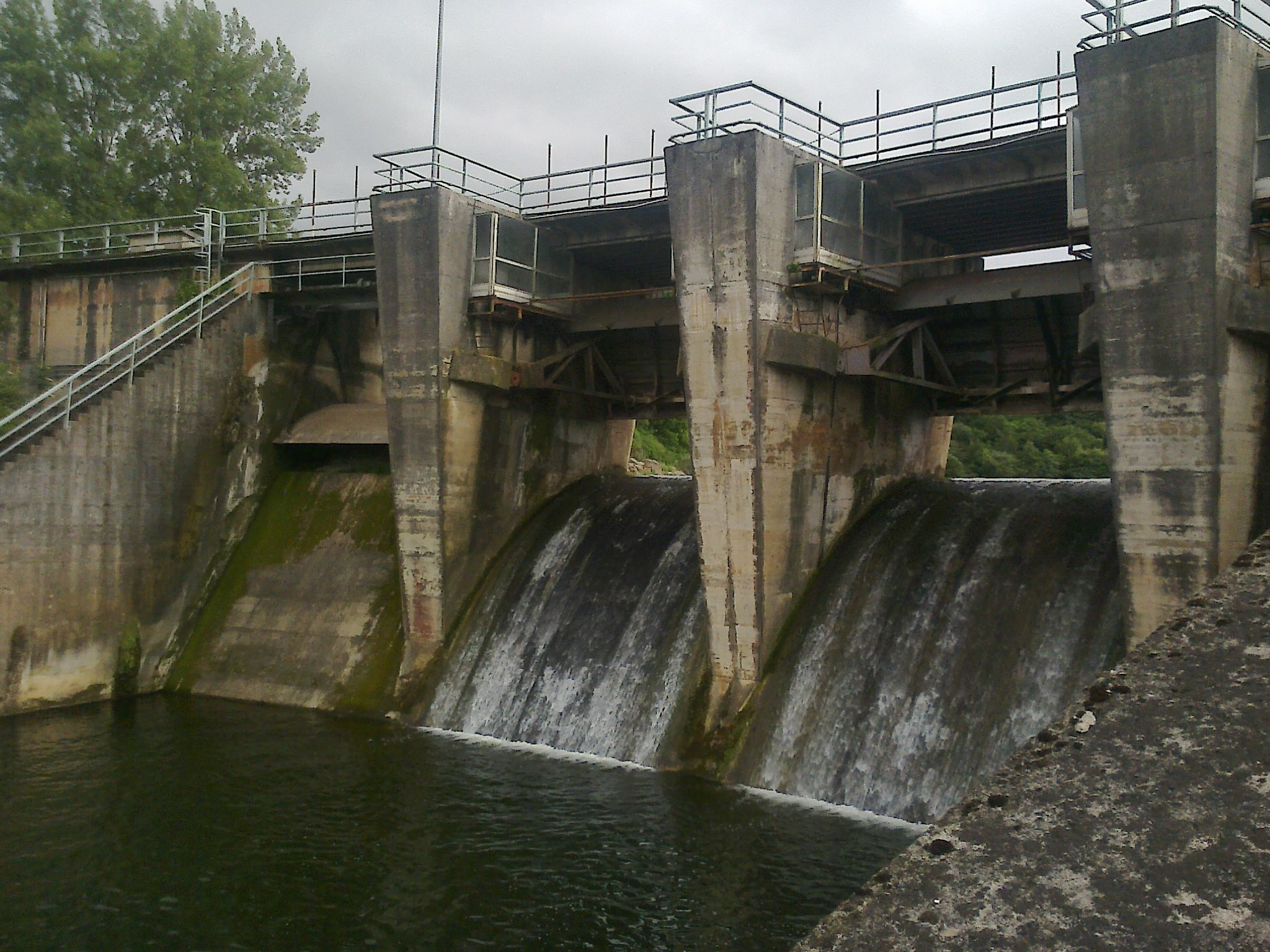
- View of the dam

- Location of the reservoir in Asturias
- Country: Spain
- Location: San Andrés de los Tacones, Gijón, Asturias
- Coordinates: 43°30′12″N 5°45′17″W
- Opening date: 1964
- Owner: Arcelor

Dam and spillways
- Type of dam: Embankment dam
- Impounds: Aboño River
- Height: 22 m (72 ft)
- Length: 434 m (1,424 ft)
- Dam volume: 199,000 m^{3} (260,000 yd^{3})
- Spillways: 1 main
- Spillway type: Floodgate
- Spillway capacity: 185 m^{3}/s (6,500 cu ft/s)

Reservoir
- Creates: Embalse de Trasona
- Total capacity: 4.1 hm^{3} (3,300 acre⋅ft)
- Catchment area: 37.5 km^{2} (14.5 sq mi)
- Surface area: 60 ha (150 acres)

San Andrés de los Tacones Reservoir (Spanish: Embalse de San Andrés de los Tacones) is a reservoir in Asturias, Spain across the Aboño River. It is located between the parishes of San Andrés de los Tacones and Serín, in the municipality of Gijón.

The reservoir, next to the Autovía A-66, is property of Arcelor and its construction was finished in 1964 with the aim of supply water to the steel plant located in Gijón.

In 2002, the City Hall of the municipality decided to open in the reservoir the first bird observatory of the city.

The reservoir is supplied by river Aboño.

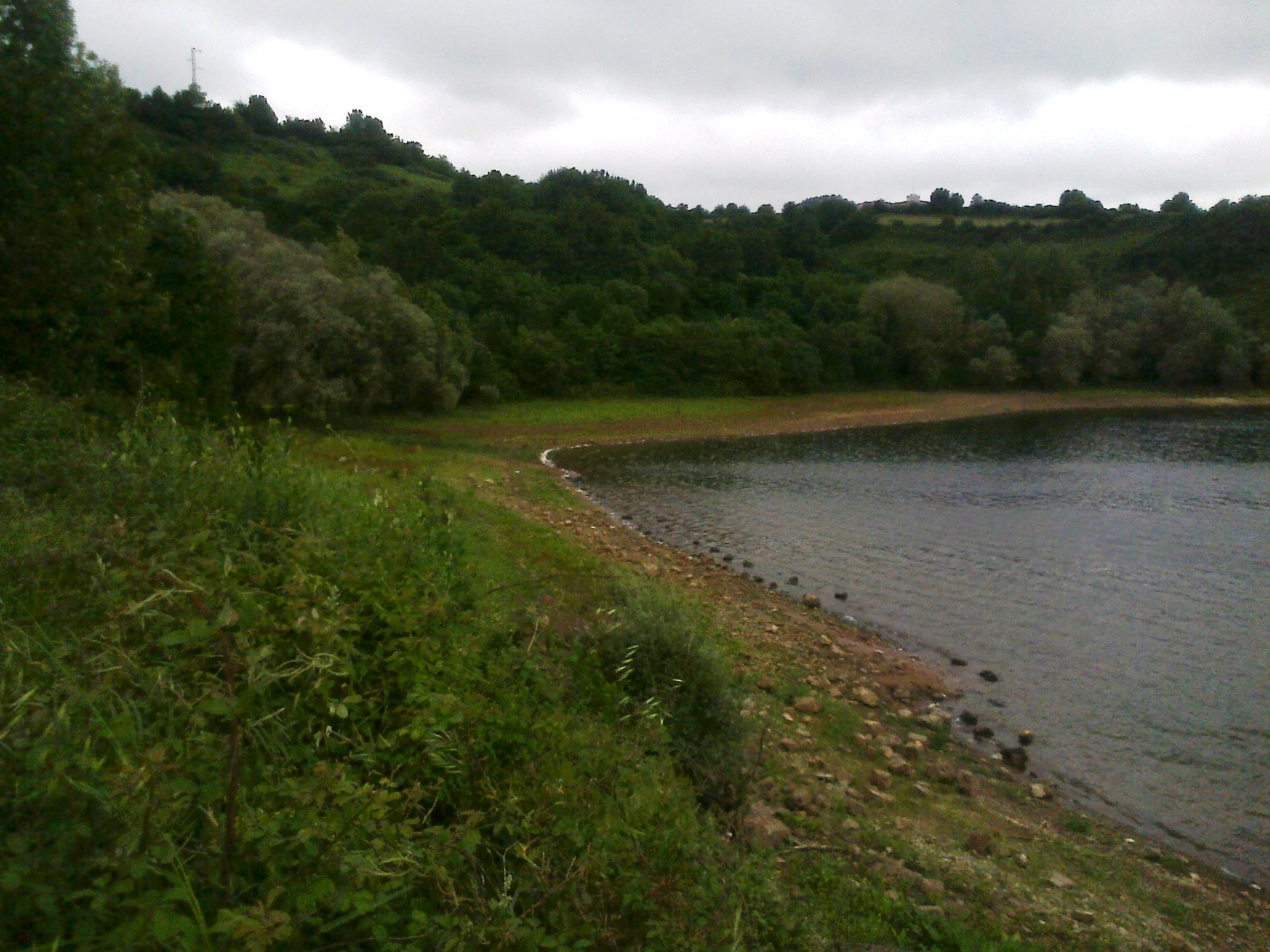
Reservoir of San Andrés de los Tacones

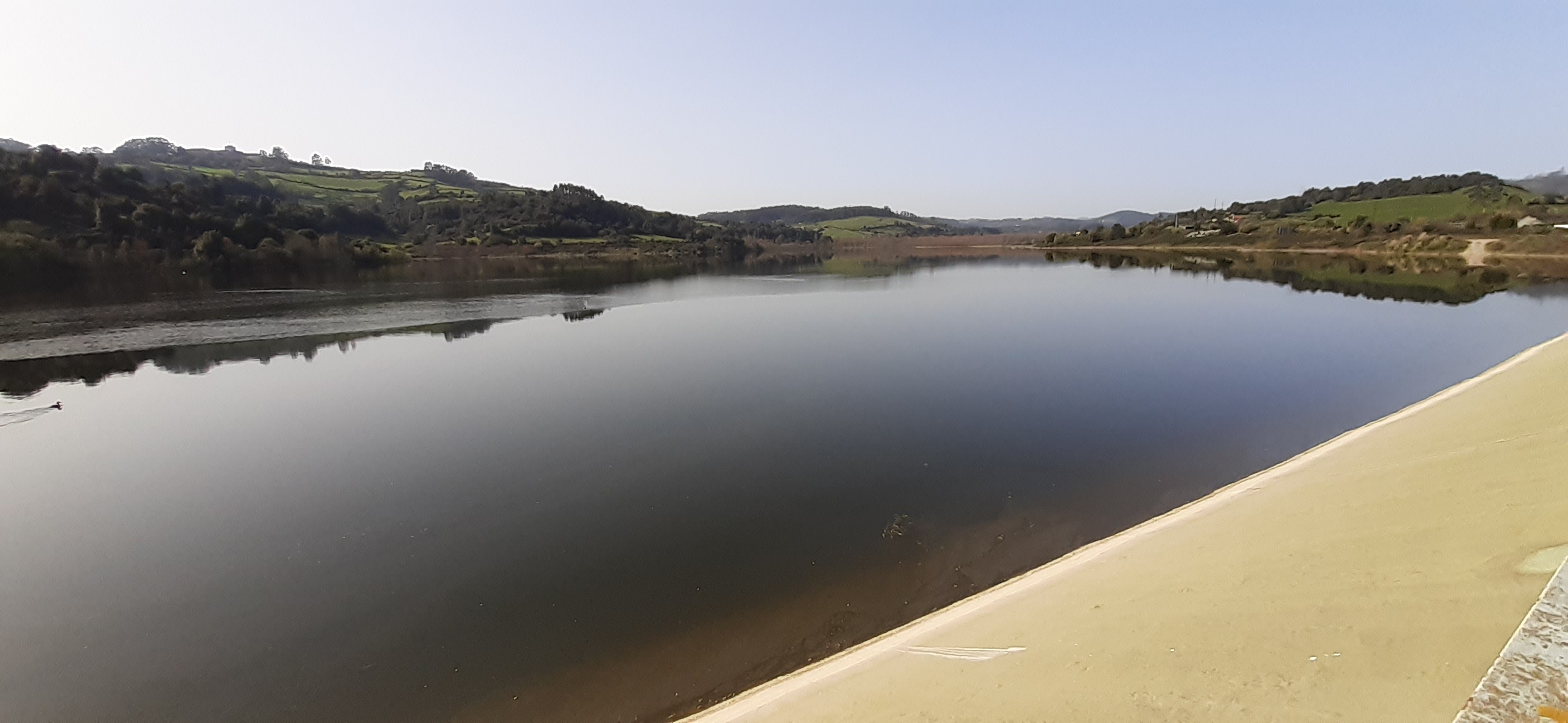
View from the dam to west over the lake
