= Solís (Corvera) =

- Parish
- Location within Spain
- Country: Spain
- Autonomous community: Asturias
- Province: Asturias
- Municipality: Corvera de Asturias

Map of Solís within Corvera

Solís is one of seven parishes (administrative divisions) in the Corvera de Asturias municipality, within the province and autonomous community of Asturias, in northern Spain.

The population is 442 (INE 2006).

== Villages ==
- Agüera (El barrio de Lupe)
- Alvares
- Calabaza
- Campañones
- El Casal (Casal)
- El Llano (El Llanu)
- El Martinete
- El Pontón
- La Cruzada (La Cruciada)
- La Sota
- Rodiles (la Capital)
- Sama de Abajo (Sama Baxo)
- Sama de Arriba (Sama Riba)
- Santa Marina (Santa Mariña)
- Táraño
