= Hirai clan =

Japanese samurai family

Hirai 平井
- Mon: Yorikake-meyui
- Home province: Chikuzen Province
- Parent house: Shōni clan
- Titles: Shugo
- Founder: Hirai Tsuneuji
- Founding year: 15th century

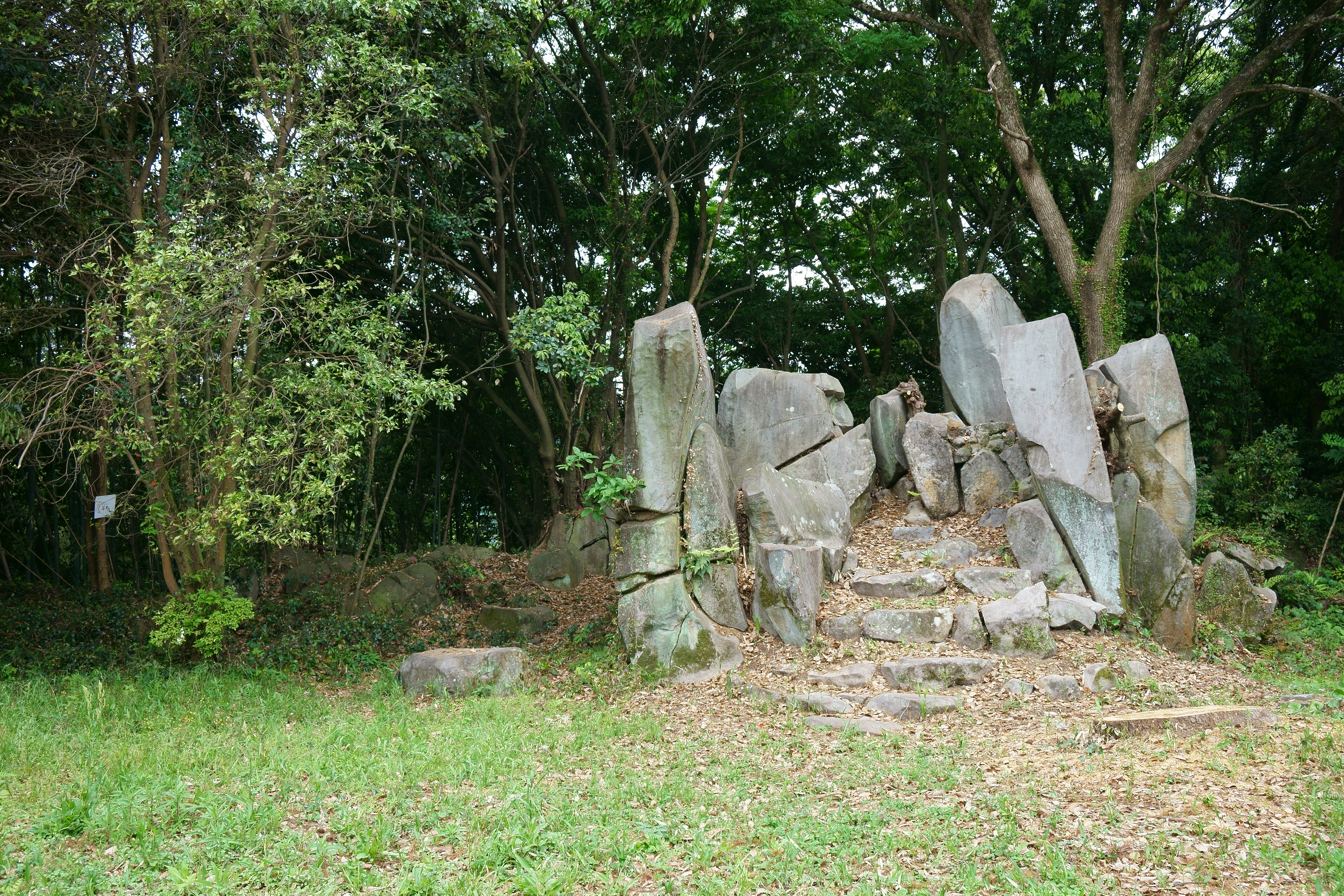
Ruins of Suko Castle in Shiroishi, Saga Prefecture

Hirai clan (Japanese: 平井氏, Hirai-shi) was a Japanese samurai family descending from the Fujiwara clan. They were a branch of the Shōni clan, the prominent family (meizoku) that ruled the Dazaifu government in northern Kyushu. They were one of the three most powerful families of governors (shugo) in Kyushu alongside the Ōtomo clan and Shimazu clan.

== History ==
In the mid-15th century, the Hirai clan ruled from Suko Castle in present-day Saga Prefecture and boasted a military power of ten thousand cavalrymen. The clan was set to rule the area after they became a retainer to the Chiba clan and defended it against the Arima clan.

In 1525, Hirai Tsunenori, who was in Kishima turned to the Arima clan after a political marriage. This caused the Hirai clan to confront the Chiba clan as well as their parent family, the Shōni clan. During the Battle of Suko Castle, consisting of four separate attacks between 1563 and 1574, their castle was finally destroyed in 1574 by the Ryūzōji clan, who later became the dominant clan in northern Kyushu. According to Hiyō Gunki, the lord of the castle, Hirai Tsuneharu, committed ritual suicide (seppuku), but the details are unknown. According to Naoshige Kōfu, his orphaned children were taken into the Nabeshima clan by Nabeshima Naoshige, and their descendants served the Saga Domain for generations.

Later, Suko Castle belonged to the Ryūzōji clan, and when Ryūzōji Takanobu retired, he moved to the castle and made it his residence. In 1584, Ryūzōji Takanobu was killed in a battle against the allied forces of the Arima and Shimazu clans. Suko Castle became the residence of Takanobu's younger brother, Ryūzōji Nobukane, who founded the Nabeshima clan.

Today, there are five hōkyōintō pagodas, which are believed to be the graves of the Hirai clan on the northern side of the Nabeshima clan mausoleum at Yōkō-ji Temple in Shiroishi, Kishima, Saga Prefecture.

== Clan heads ==
1. Hirai Tsuneuji
2. Hirai Tsunetaka
3. Hirai Hisatsune
4. Hirai Morihide
5. Hirai Tsunehide
6. Hirai Tsunesada
7. Hirai Yorikane
8. Hirai Tsunenori
9. Hirai Tsuneharu
10. Hirai Naohide
11. Hirai Tsunefusa
12. Hirai Tsunekiyo

== See also ==
- Dazaifu
- Ōtomo clan
- Shimazu clan
