= Cancienes =

- Parish
- Location within Spain
- Country: Spain
- Autonomous community: Asturias
- Province: Asturias
- Municipality: Corvera de Asturias

Map of Cancienes within Corvera

Cancienes is one of seven parishes (administrative divisions) in the Corvera de Asturias municipality, within the province and autonomous community of Asturias, in northern Spain.

The population is 1,651 (INE 2007).

== Villages ==
- Aguilero (Guilero)
- Bango
- Barredo (Barreo)
- Camina
- Campo la Vega (El Campu la Vega)
- Cancienes
- El Acebo (L'Acebo)
- El Cabañón
- El Monte
- El Portazgo (El Portalgo)
- Fuentecaliente (Fontecaliente)
- La Cabaña (La Cabaña)
- La Pedrera
- La Pescal
- La Picosa
- La Rebollada (La Rebollada)
- Menudera (La Menudera)
- Mora
- Moriana
- Núñez (Nuña)
