= Molleda =

- Parish
- Location within Spain
- Country: Spain
- Autonomous community: Asturias
- Province: Asturias
- Municipality: Corvera de Asturias

Map of Molleda within Corvera

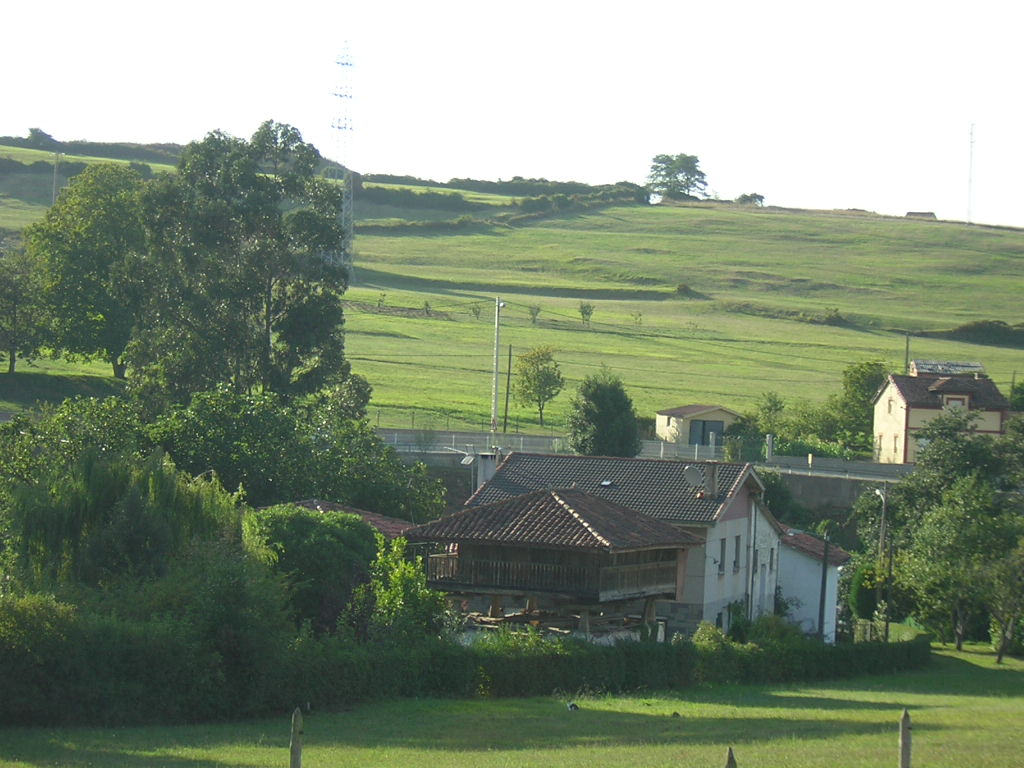
El Molín, a village in Molleda

Molleda is one of seven parishes (administrative divisions) in the Corvera de Asturias municipality, within the province and autonomous community of Asturias, in northern Spain.

The population is 717 (INE 2006).

== Villages ==
- Barrio Molleda
- Candamo
- Carruébano (Carruébanu)
- Castiello (Castiellu)
- El Barrial
- El Molino (El Molín)
- Moncó
- El Pidre
- El Pino (El Pinu)
- El Sabledal
- Entrialgo
- Esquilera
- La Estebanina (Estebanina)
- García
- Grandellana
- Juncedo Campo (Xuncéu)
- La Cogulla
- La Escuela (La Llaguna)
- La Peluca
- La Reguera
- La Sierra
- La Trapa
- Lavandera (Llavandera)
- Llandones
- Los Espinos
- Peruyal (La Peruyal)
- Ralla
- Villanueva
