= San Andrés de los Tacones =

- Parish
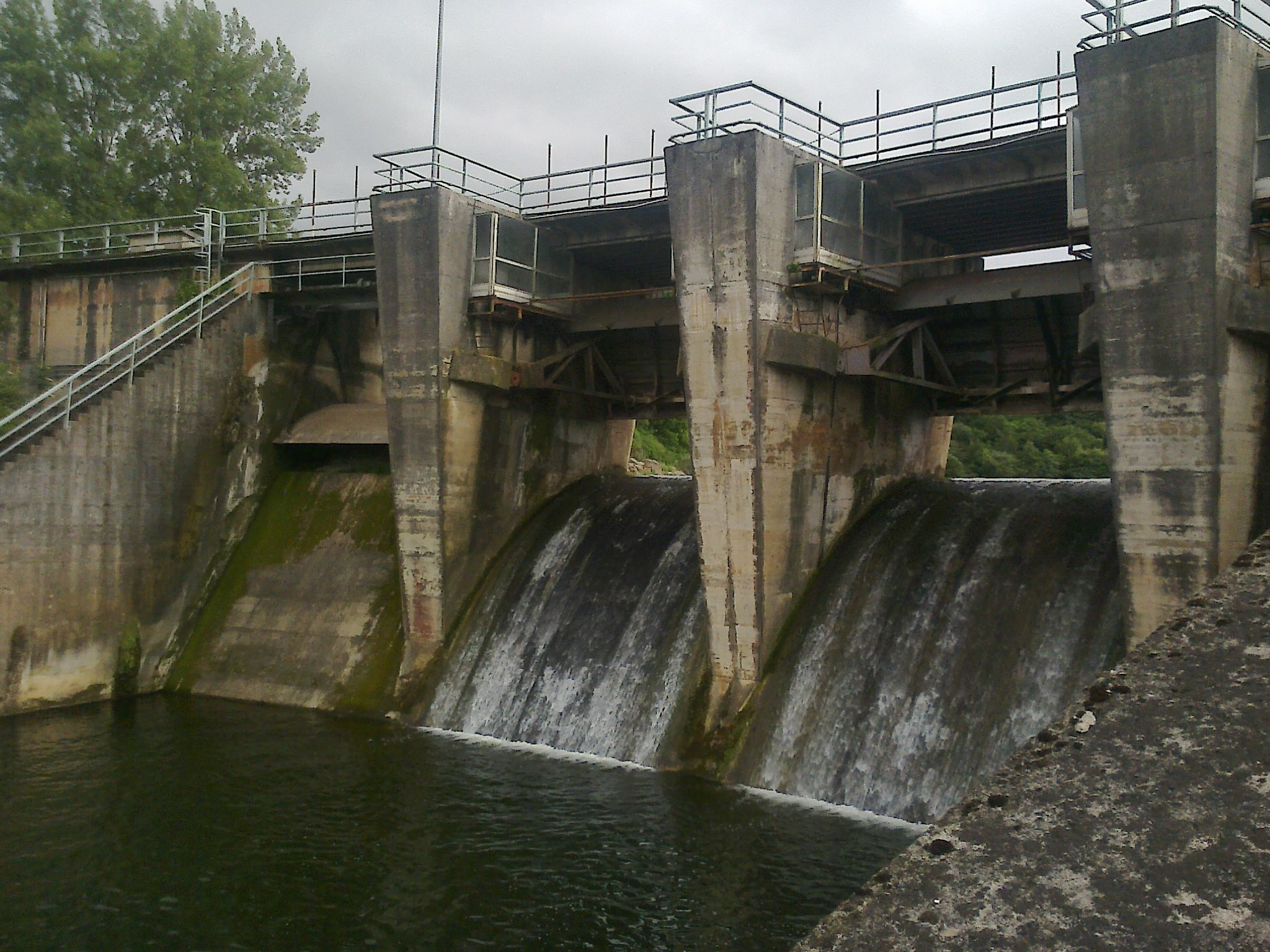
- San Andrés de los Tacones dam
- Interactive map of San Andrés de los Tacones
- Country: Spain
- Autonomous community: Asturias
- Province: Asturias
- Municipality: Gijón

Population (2016)
  - Total: 151

San Andrés de los Tacones is a parish of the municipality of Gijón, in Asturias, Spain. Its population was of 216 inhabitants in 2008 and 160 in 2012.

San Andrés de los Tacones is located on the western area of Gijón / Xixón, and borders the asturian municipality of Carreño in the west and with the district of Serín in the south.

In the limit with Cenero is located the reservoir with the name of the district, built in 1970, for supplying water to the Arcelor steel factory of Gijón. Near this reservoir is being built the Zone of Logistic and Industrial Activities of Asturies, more commonly known as ZALIA.

== Villages and their neighbourhoods ==
La Melendrera

- El Falcún

La Reboria

- La Turriana

San Andrés

- La Casa Noriega
- La Raposiega

Villar
