= Alvares (river) =

River in Spain

Location
- Country: Spain
- State: Asturias
- Region: Avilés, Corvera, Llanera

Physical characteristics
- Source
  - coordinates: 43°28′34″N 5°49′33″W
  - elevation: 248 m (814 ft)
- Mouth
  - location: Bay of Biscay
  - coordinates: 43°35′3″N 5°55′19″W
  - elevation: 0 m (0 ft)
- Length: 14 km (8.7 mi)

The Alvares is a river in northern Spain flowing through the Autonomous Community of Asturias.
