= Villa (Corvera) =

- Parish
- Location within Spain
- Country: Spain
- Autonomous community: Asturias
- Province: Asturias
- Municipality: Corvera de Asturias

Population (2011)
  - Total: 386

Map of Villa within Corvera

Villa is one of seven parishes (administrative divisions) in the Corvera de Asturias municipality, within the province and autonomous community of Asturias, in northern Spain.

The population is 386 (INE 2011).

== Villages ==
- Barriero
- Capiello
- El Pontón
- El Suco
- El Truébano
- El Vallín
- Fabar
- La Laguna
- Llamera
- La Tabla
- Las Huertas
- Lloreda
- Tras la Iglesia
- Villa
