= Fertiberia =

Fertilizer company in Spain

- Formation: 1962
- Type: S.A.
- Purpose: Chemical industry
- Headquarters: Grupo Fertiberia
- Products: Fertilizers, ammonia
- Website: www.grupofertiberia.com

Fertiberia is a Spanish company in the chemical sector whose activity is focused on the production of fertilizers, ammonia and other derived products, and is currently the largest fertilizer manufacturer in Spain. The company is also the head of the Fertiberia Group, a conglomerate made up of several subsidiaries with a presence in countries such as Algeria, Portugal and France.

== History ==
=== Origins ===
In 1962, the public limited company "Fertilizantes de Iberia" (Fertiberia) was founded for the construction of several fertilizer factories in A Coruña, Huelva and Castellón. Entities such as the Bank of Bilbao, the Gulf Oil Corporation and the International Development & Investment Company participated in its creation. The company became closely linked to the development of the Chemical Park of Huelva in the 1970s, where one of its factories was located. In 1974, the Unión Explosivos Río Tinto (ERT) group, which had a strong presence in the Chemical Park, absorbed Fertiberia. As a result of this strategic relationship, the Huelva plant of Fertiberia came to be supplied with pyrites obtained from the Rio Tinto mines. In 1989, the assets of the ERT group were integrated into the Ercros holding company. The latter proceeded to a reorganization of its fertilizer division, from which the company Fesa-Enfersa was born, which at the time was one of the largest private fertilizer companies in Spain. Despite its pre-eminent position, in 1992 both Fesa-Enfersa and its parent company Ercros went into receivership, due to the large debt they accumulated.

=== Grupo Fertiberia ===
In 1995 the Villar Mir Group took control of the assets of Fesa-Enfersa, which would form the basis for the re-foundation of Fertiberia. From then on, a process of consolidation and expansion began, which led to the purchase of Sefanitro (1996), Química del Estroncio (2002) and Fercampo (2012), as well as the creation of new subsidiaries in different areas. This would lead Fertiberia to become the main Spanish fertilizer company, with presence in France and Portugal. However, as part of the internal reorganization process, some production plants in Cartagena, Seville and Barakaldo were also closed in 2003–2004. In 2020, the Swedish-German group Triton Partners took control of Fertiberia.

== Structure ==
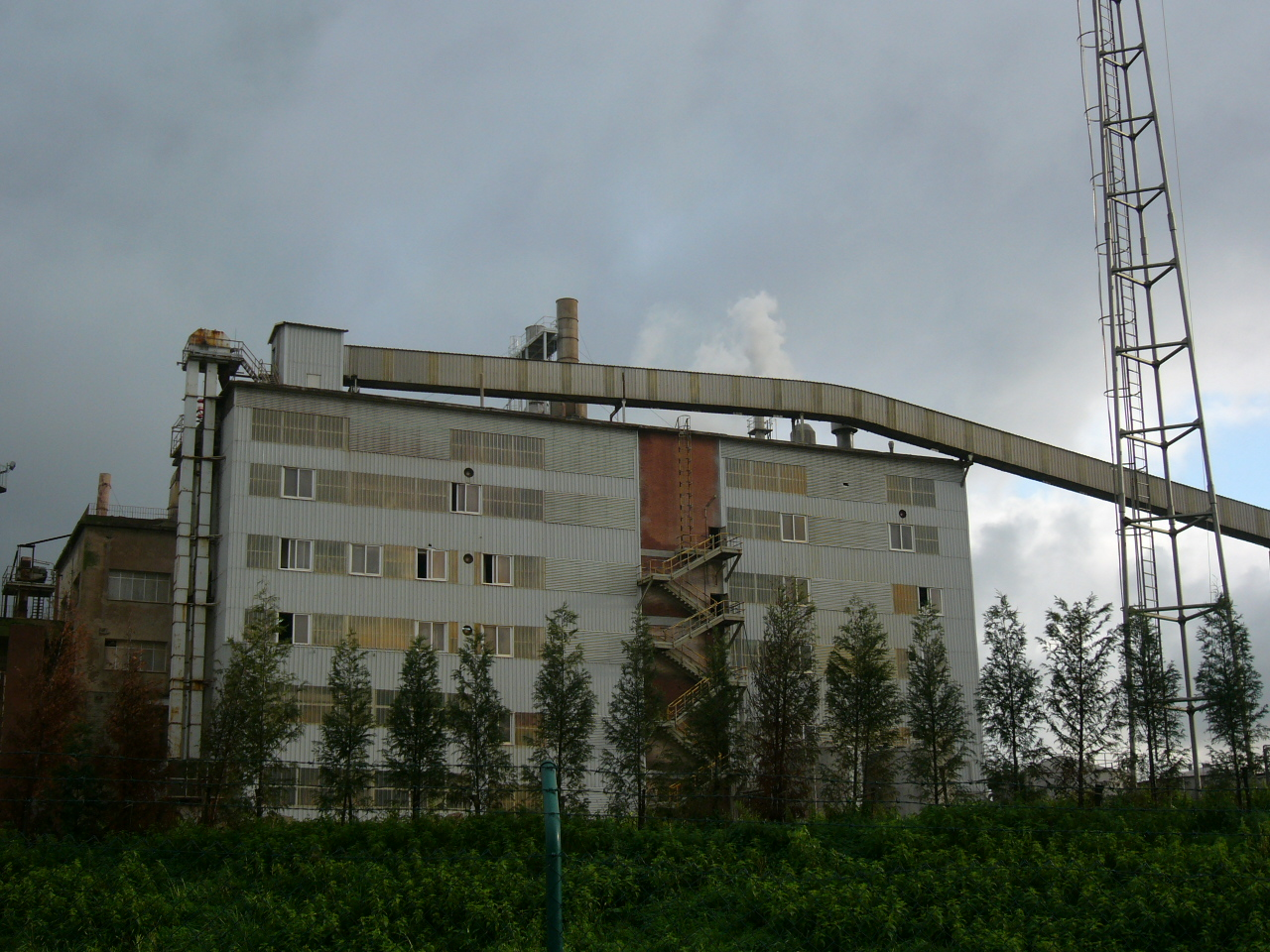
Fertiberia's factory in Trasona, next to the municipality of Avilés.

The company currently has several production centers throughout Spain: Palos de la Frontera, Huelva, Puertollano, Sagunto and Avilés. The Huelva factory, located in the Chemical Park area, is the most important of all the Fertiberia Group's factories. Fertiberia also has a series of warehouses and logistics centers. The head office is located in Madrid, specifically in Agustín de Foxá street.

== Bibliography ==
- Álvarez, Santiago (1968). Sobre Galicia (in Spanish). Paris: Editions de la Librairie du Globe.
- Arenas Posadas, Carlos (2017). "Riotinto, el declive de un mito minero (1954-2003)". Revista de Historia Industrial (in Spanish) (69). Barcelona: Universidad de Barcelona: 109–142. ISSN 1132-7200.
- Fábregas, Dídac (1997). España en la encrucijada: evolución o involución (in Spanish). Ediciones del Bronce.
- Ferrero Blanco, María Dolores (2000). "Un modelo de minería contemporánea: Huelva, del colonialismo a la mundialización". Universidad de Huelva (in Spanish).
- Salmon, Keith G. (1995). The Modern Spanish Economy. Transformation and Integration Into Europe. Pinter Publishers.
- Sumpsi, José María; Barceló, Luis Vicente (1996). La Ronda Uruguay y el sector agroalimentario español (in Spanish). Madrid: Ministerio de Comercio y Turismo.
- Tomás, Carmen; Alonso, Ignacio (1993). El provocador. Carlos Solchaga, de la reconversión industrial a la crisis economíca y social (in Spanish). Ediciones Temas de Hoy.
- Yravedra, Vicente (1999). "Fertilizantes, 70 años de evolución (1929-1999)" (PDF). Agricultura. Revista agropecuaria y ganadera (in Spanish) (806). Editorial Agrícola Española: 778–789. ISSN 0002-1334.
