= Los Campos (Corvera) =

- Parish
- Location within Spain
- Country: Spain
- Autonomous community: Asturias
- Province: Asturias
- Municipality: Corvera de Asturias

Map of Los Campos within Corvera

Los Campos is one of seven parishes (administrative divisions) in the Corvera de Asturias municipality, within the province and autonomous community of Asturias, in northern Spain.

The population is 3,102 (INE 2011).

== Villages ==
- Ablaneda
- Entrevías
- La Rozona
- Los Campos
- Santa Cruz
