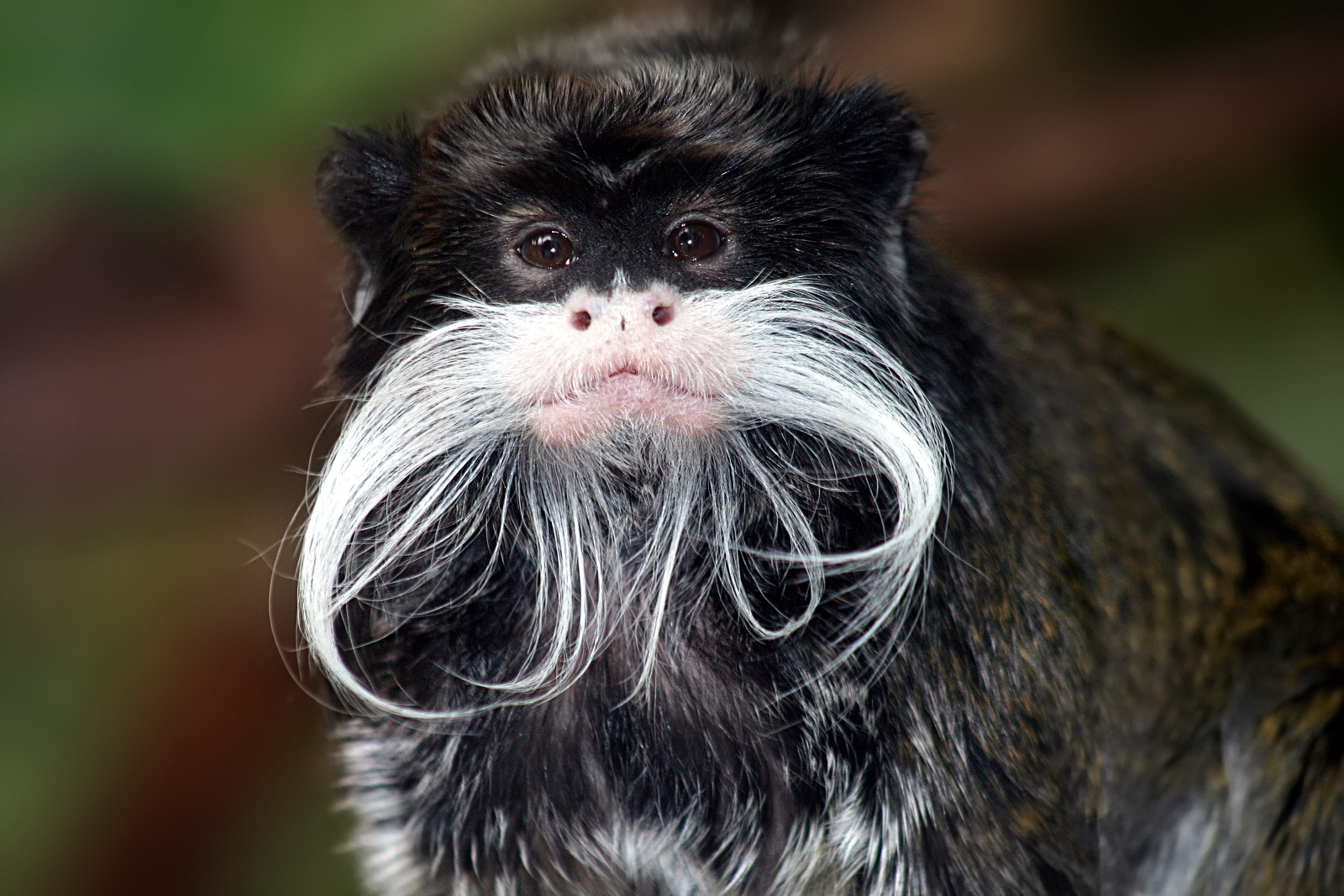

Conservation status
- Least Concern (IUCN 3.1)

Scientific classification
- Kingdom: Animalia
- Phylum: Chordata
- Class: Mammalia
- Order: Primates
- Family: Callitrichidae
- Genus: Saguinus
- Species: S. imperator
- Subspecies: S. i. subgrisescens

Trinomial name
- Saguinus imperator subgrisescens (Lönnberg, 1940)
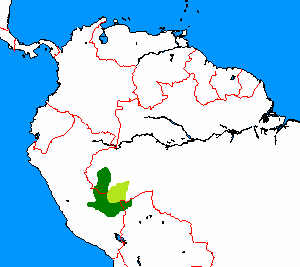
- Ranges of both subspecies of the emperor tamarin; bearded emperor tamarin in dark green and black-chinned emperor tamarin in lighter green

= Bearded emperor tamarin =

Subspecies of New World monkey

The bearded emperor tamarin (Saguinus imperator subgrisescens) is one of the two subspecies of the emperor tamarin. It is mostly found in the tropical forests of southwestern Brazil and eastern Peru. This omnivorous member of the Callitrichidae family is usually found in groups of 4 and shares social relations with other callitrichids. They communicate vocally, as well as with olfactory signals. Males tend to be primary caregivers for their young. It is considered as a species of Least Concern by the IUCN, despite threats from increased habitat loss.

== Behavior ==
=== Diet and feeding habits ===
This subspecies of tamarin is omnivorous, and feeds on fruit, nectar, tree sap, flowers, and fungi, as well as small animals like insects, snails and frogs. It especially enjoys tree sap (or gum) in the late dry season and early wet season. To access this resource, the bearded emperor tamarin uses existing or healing holes made by other tamarin species, rather than digging its own.

=== Social behavior ===
Bearded emperor tamarin social groups average 4 individuals that sleep in close quarters under the cover of isolated vine-covered trees. However, they also share territory and social relations to other species of callitrichids, such as with the brown-mantled tamarin, which they are dominant to. They also tend to share such ties with the red-bellied titi monkey, albeit less frequently.

==== Vocalization ====
This subspecies of emperor tamarin communicates amongst themselves extensively via vocalizations, such as whistles, chirps and long, descending whistles. When in proximity to territorial boundaries, their presence and its delimitations are announced via louder vocalizations.

Also, the calls of this subspecies sometimes get answered by those of the brown-mantled tamarin, with the opposite also being true, indicating their close relationship.

==== Chemical communication ====
The bearded emperor tamarin is known to rely heavily on chemical odour signals, composed of different arrangements of 123 different volatile compounds to communicate and mark territory. These compounds mainly include hydrocarbons, alcohols, aldehydes, and ketones. Typically, these scents are produced via their well-developed vomeronasal organ and three specialized glands present in the anogenital, suprapubic, and sternal areas of their bodies. These scented secretions are deposited directly in the environment, or on another member of their species, which happens to advertise an individual's identity or status, to mark or defend territory and to signal the geolocation of food resources.

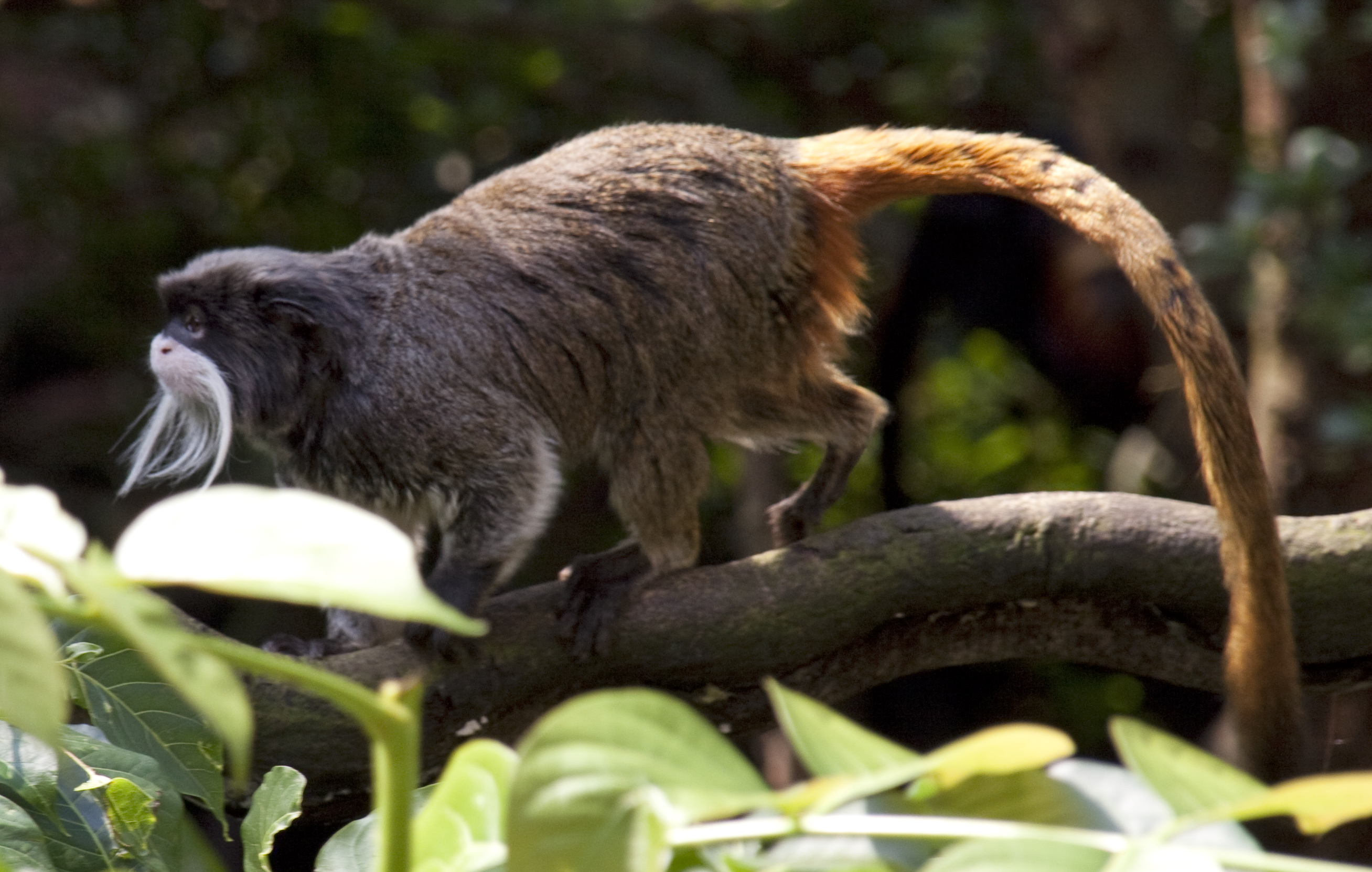
A Bearded Emperor Tamarin moving along lower-lying branches of a tropical forest.

These marks are a form of durable communication, as these olfactory cues stay behind long after a group has left the scene, in contrast with temporary visual or acoustic signals.

One specific documented use of such olfactory communication can be found in the way a dominant female will release certain pheromones within her territory to prevent subservient females in her group from breeding. Females also exclusively produce the longifolene compound, while males were shown to secrete no unique chemical in one study.

In fact, females secrete significantly more olfactory markings than males, and individuals of reproductive age also produce more than juveniles or subordinates. This indicates the reproductive importance of olfactory markings.

=== Breeding ===
Typically, only one pair of bearded emperor tamarins of their respective social group will reproduce. As such, the dominant female often births twins, which are carried by the breeding male until they are 70 days old, only passing them back to their mother for feeding.

The babies mature after 12–18 months and reach peak maturity at the age of 2.

== Range ==
The bearded emperor tamarin's range includes territories in western Brazil and Peru while also occasionally being found in Bolivia. In Brazil, its range includes: the Upper Rio Jurua region in the southwest of Amazonas state and to the east of Acre state. In Peru, it inhabits the upper Rio Ucayali and Urubamba basins in the Loreto province and the upper Rio Madre de Dios basin in Madre de Dios; it is sometimes seen in the bordering Cusco Department.

== Habitat ==
This subspecies tends to inhabit primary and secondary lowland evergreen and broadleaf tropical rainforests. They mainly use the bottom 300 m (980 ft) of the canopy to move around and feed.

== Taxonomy ==
The bearded emperor tamarin and black-chinned emperor tamarin populations of the emperor tamarin were formally differentiated as distinct subspecies in 1977.

The main evolution in morphological traits, compared to other tamarins, consists of a hypertrophied mustache, which they share with their last common ancestor. This is seen as a first grade of facial hair modifications (seen in black-chinned emperor tamarin, whereas this subspecies' advanced another grade by the formation of prominent chin whiskers and concealment or deterioration of the black chin patch found in the earlier form.

Further distinctions include the repartition of pheomelanin on different parts of their bodies, which is responsible for yellow-reddish color (such as in freckles), as well as different color-saturation and bleaching in others parts.

== Conservation status ==
The bearded emperor tamarin is listed as Least Concern by the IUCN, but it is slowly becoming in danger of extinction through destruction of habitat. Many live in zoos or are illegally sold as pets.
