= Trasona =

Trasona / Tresona
- Parish
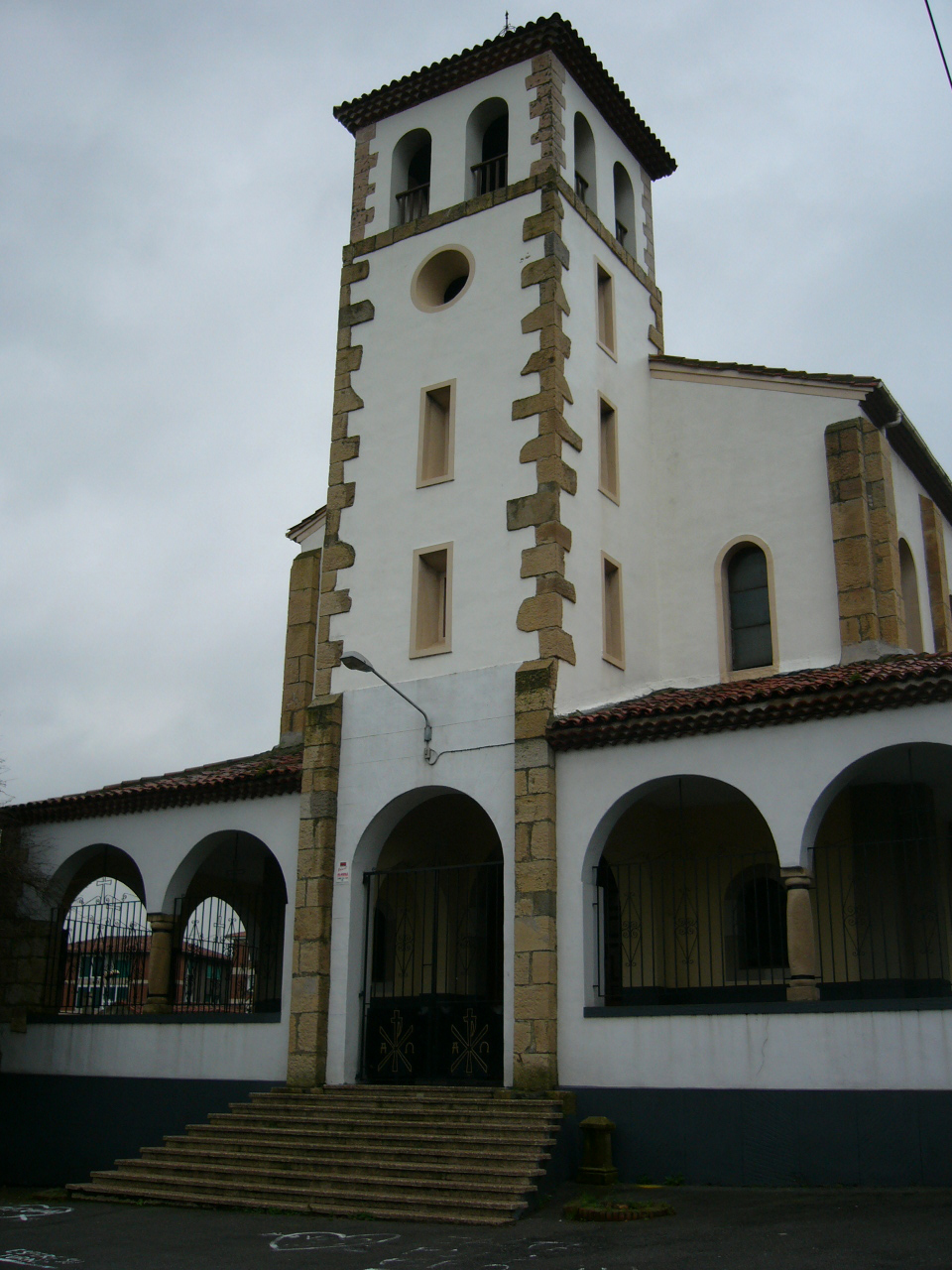
- San Vicente de Trasona church

- Coat of arms

- Location of Trasona in Corvera

- Location within Spain
- Coordinates: 43°33′N 5°53′W
- Country: Spain
- Autonomous community: Asturias
- Province: Asturias
- Municipality: Corvera de Asturias

Population
  - Total: 2,103

Trasona (in Asturian Tresona, and officially Trasona/Tresona) is one of seven parishes (administrative divisions) in the Corvera de Asturias municipality, within the province and autonomous community of Asturias, in northern Spain.

Its population is 2,103 (INE 2011).

== Economy ==
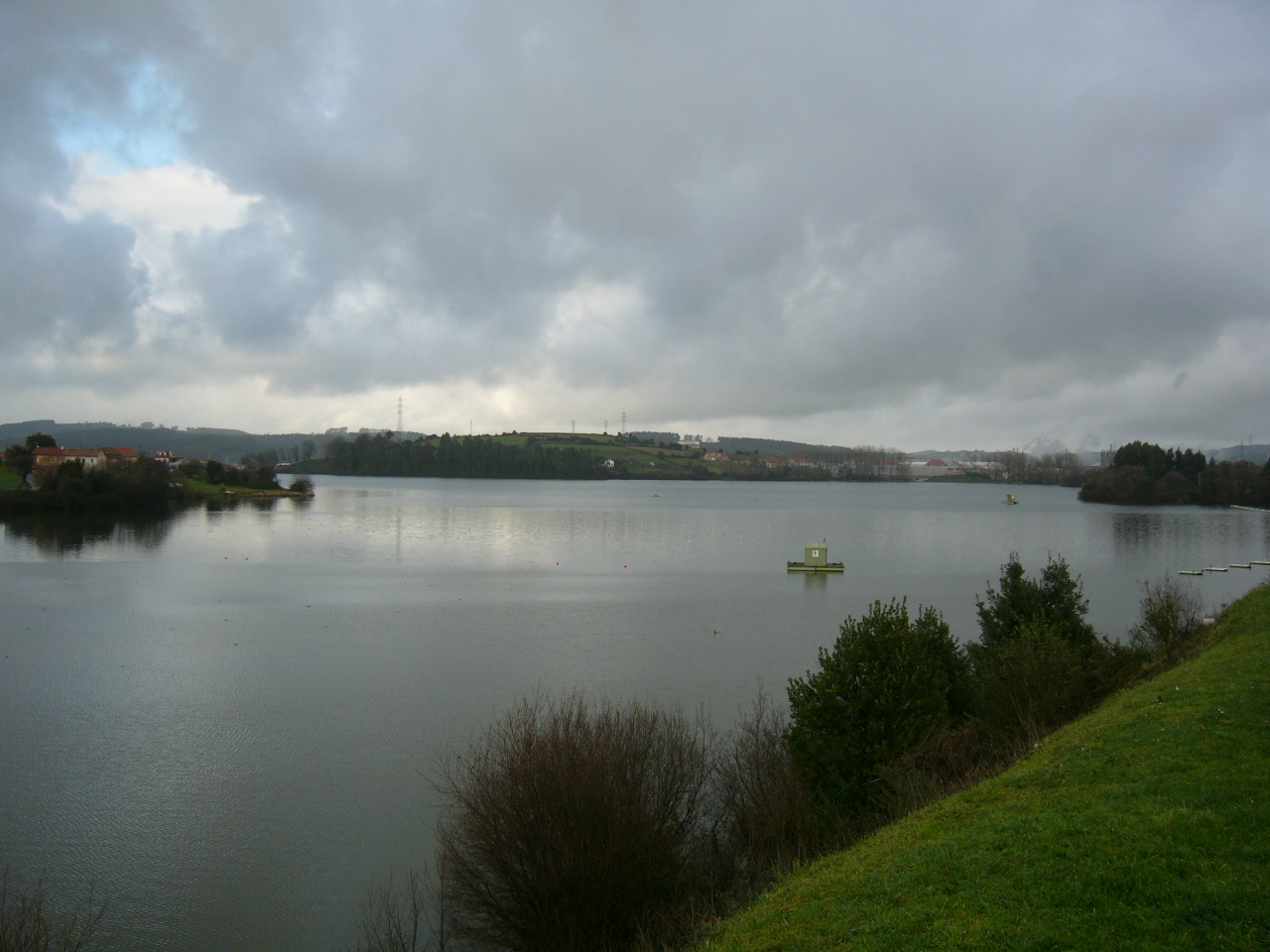
Trasona reservoir

The main economical activity in Trasona is the industry, with the plants of Aceralia and Fertiberia as the most importants in the municipality of Corvera. In the town is located Parque Astur, one of the most important commercial centres in Asturias. Trasona serves also as livestock zone.

== Sports ==
In Trasona is located the Trasona reservoir which serves as a high performance centre, mainly for canoeing and rowing. It hosted the 2010 Canoe Sprint European Championships.

== Villages ==
Map of Trasona

- El Cuetu
- Fafilán
- Favila
- Gabitos
- Gudín
- La Marzaniella
- Mocín
- Overo
- El Palacio
- El Pedrero / El Pedréu
- Rovés
- San Pelayo
- Silvota
- Tarín
- Trasmonte / Tresmonte
- Truyés
- Les Cases del Gozón
- El Pobladín
