= Suko Castle =

Castle in Saga, Japan

- 須古城
- Shiroishi, Kishima, Saga Prefecture, Japan
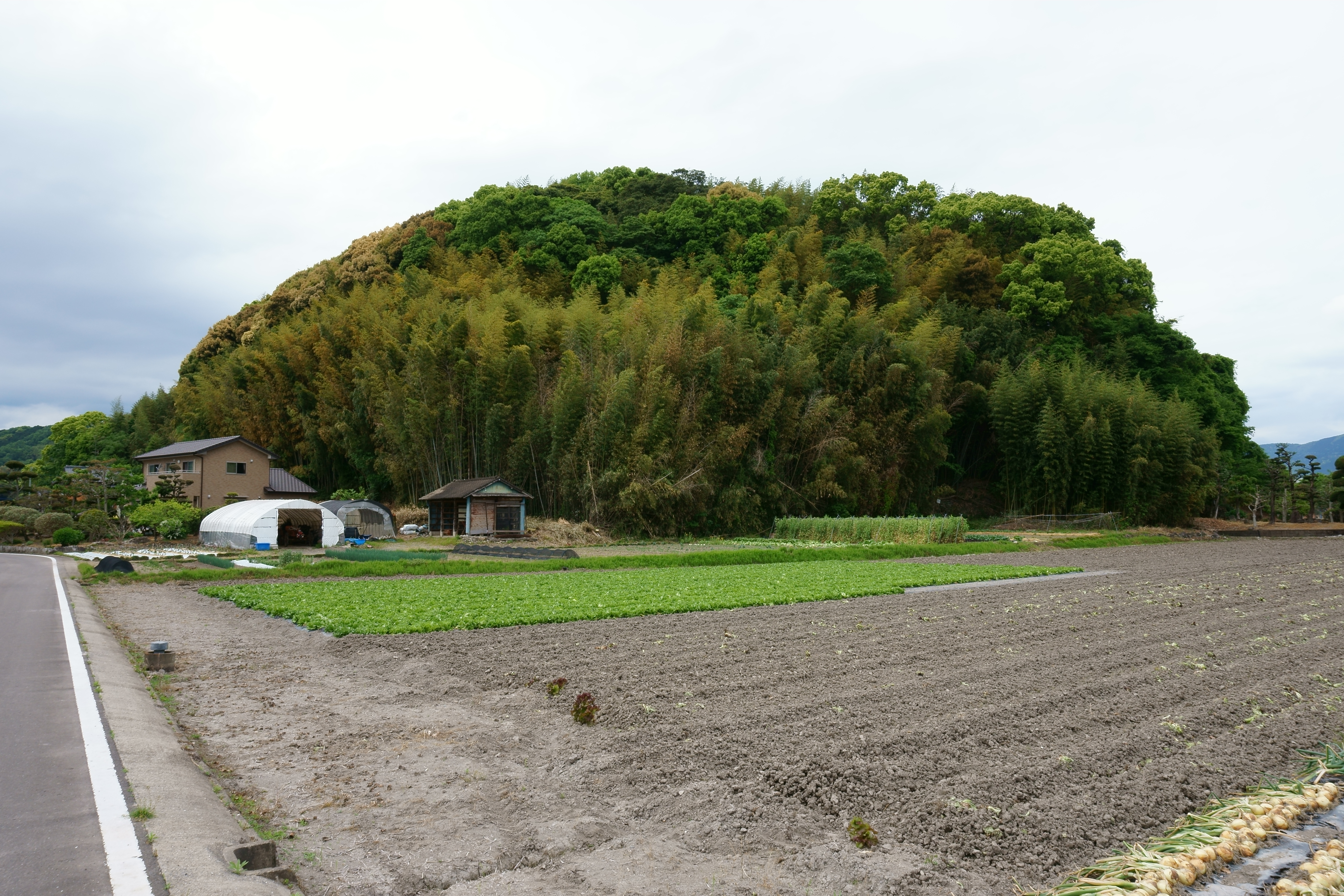
- Suko Castle

Site information
- Type: Okajiro-style castle
- Owner: Hirai clan, Ryūzōji clan, Suko Nabeshima clan
- Condition: ruins

Site history
- Built: Unknown
- Built by: Hirai clan
- Demolished: Unknown

Garrison information
- Past commanders: Ryūzōji Takanobu, Ryūzōji Nobukane

Suko Castle (須古城, Suko-jō) is the site of a castle structure in Shiroishi, Saga Prefecture, Japan. Its ruins have been protected as a Prefectural Historic Site.

== History ==
In the Muromachi period, Suko Castle was the home castle of the Hirai clan. The lords of the castle included Hirai Tsuneharu. The Ryūzōji clan attacked the castle on four occasions, and it finally fell in 1574.

After the fall of the Hirai clan, Ryūzōji Takanobu moved his residence to Suko Castle. Takanobu made extensive renovations to the castle, adding new kuruwa walls, earthworks, fortifications, a double moat, and a koguchi entrance, expanding it to 560 m on east-west axis and 580 m on north-south axis, making it the largest flatland-mountain castle in Saga Prefecture. As a result of the renovations, it became an important castle that effectively ruled and controlled northern Kyushu.

During the Sengoku period, the Ryūzōji clan, along with the Ōtomo clan and Shimazu clan, ruled Kyushu as one of the three great daimyo of Kyushu. From Suko Castle, Takanobu ruled Hizen, Higo, Buzen, Chikugo, and Chikuzen Provinces, and Suko Castle became the capital of the great domain.

When Takanobu was killed in the Battle of Okitawate, his younger brother, Ryūzōji Nobukane, became the lord of the castle.

In 1580, Ryūzōji Masaie succeeded his father and moved to Suko Castle.

== Gallery ==
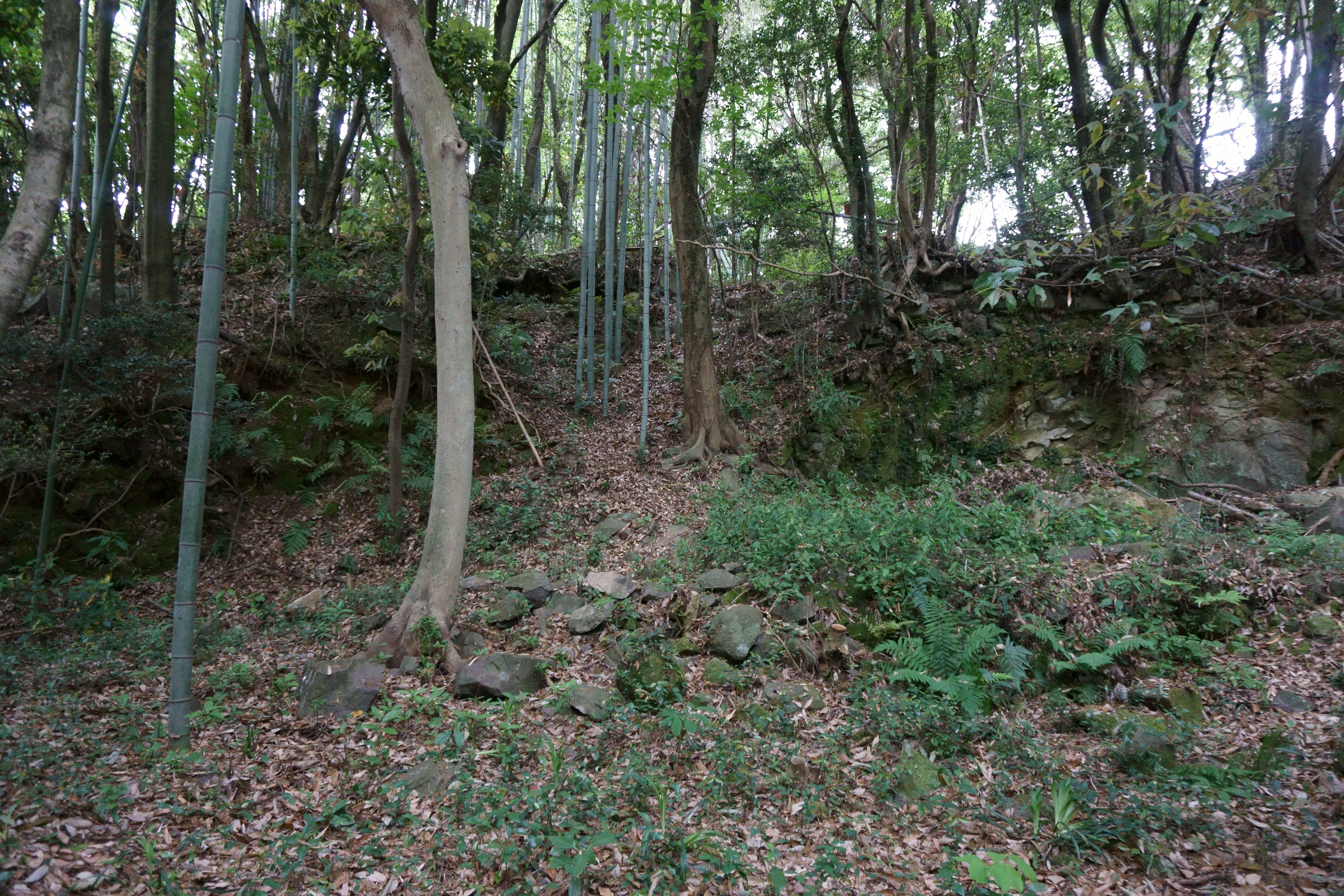
Remaining stone wall of Suko Castle

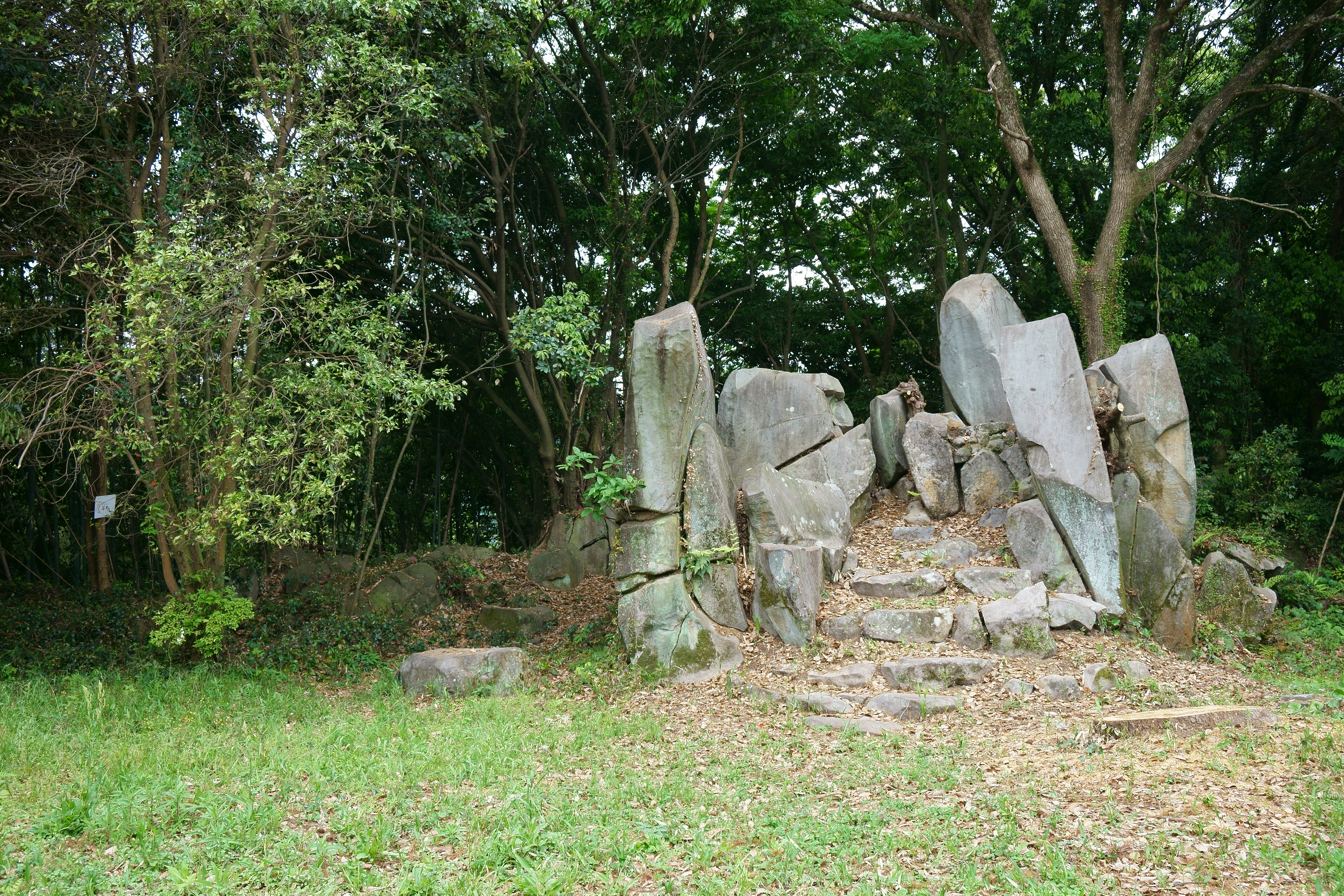
Stones called bulletproof stone
