= Alfilorios Reservoir =

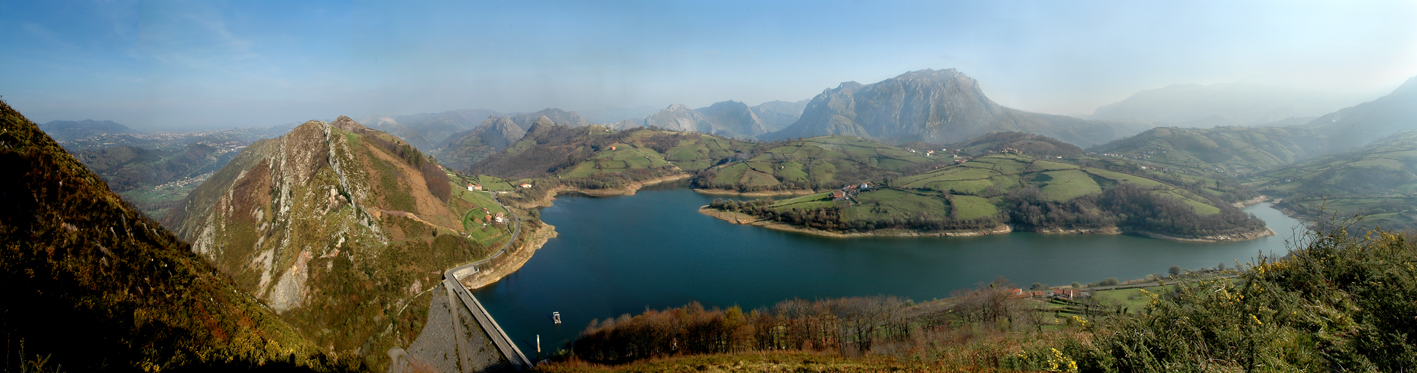
- View of the reservoir

- Location of the Alfilorios reservoir in Asturias
- Country: Spain
- Location: Ribera de Arriba, Asturias
- Coordinates: 43°17′42″N 5°55′00″W
- Construction began: 1960
- Opening date: 1990
- Owner: Hydrographic Confederation of the Cantabric

Dam and spillways
- Type of dam: Embankment
- Impounds: Barrea River
- Height: 67 m (220 ft)
- Length: 171.7 m (563 ft)
- Dam volume: 346,740 m^{3} (453,520 yd^{3})
- Spillways: 1 main
- Spillway type: Chute Spillway
- Spillway capacity: 35.5 m^{3}/s (1,250 cu ft/s)

Reservoir
- Creates: Embalse de Alfilorios
- Total capacity: 9.14 hm^{3} (7,410 acre⋅ft)
- Catchment area: 4.09 km^{2} (1.58 sq mi)
- Surface area: 52 ha (130 acres)
- Maximum water depth: 66 m (217 ft)

Alfilorios Reservoir is a reservoir in Asturias, Spain across the Barrea River. The dam is located in Ribera de Arriba, but the reservoir is between this municipality and Morcín. It has the aim of supply water to the central zone of Asturias, essentially Oviedo and also an area for fishing and canoeing.

== Construction ==
The construction of the dam started in 1968, but one year later the works were disrupted until 1974. After this year, the construction continued until 1983. The dam was finally opened in 1990.
