= Aboño =

River in Spain

Aboño Aboñu
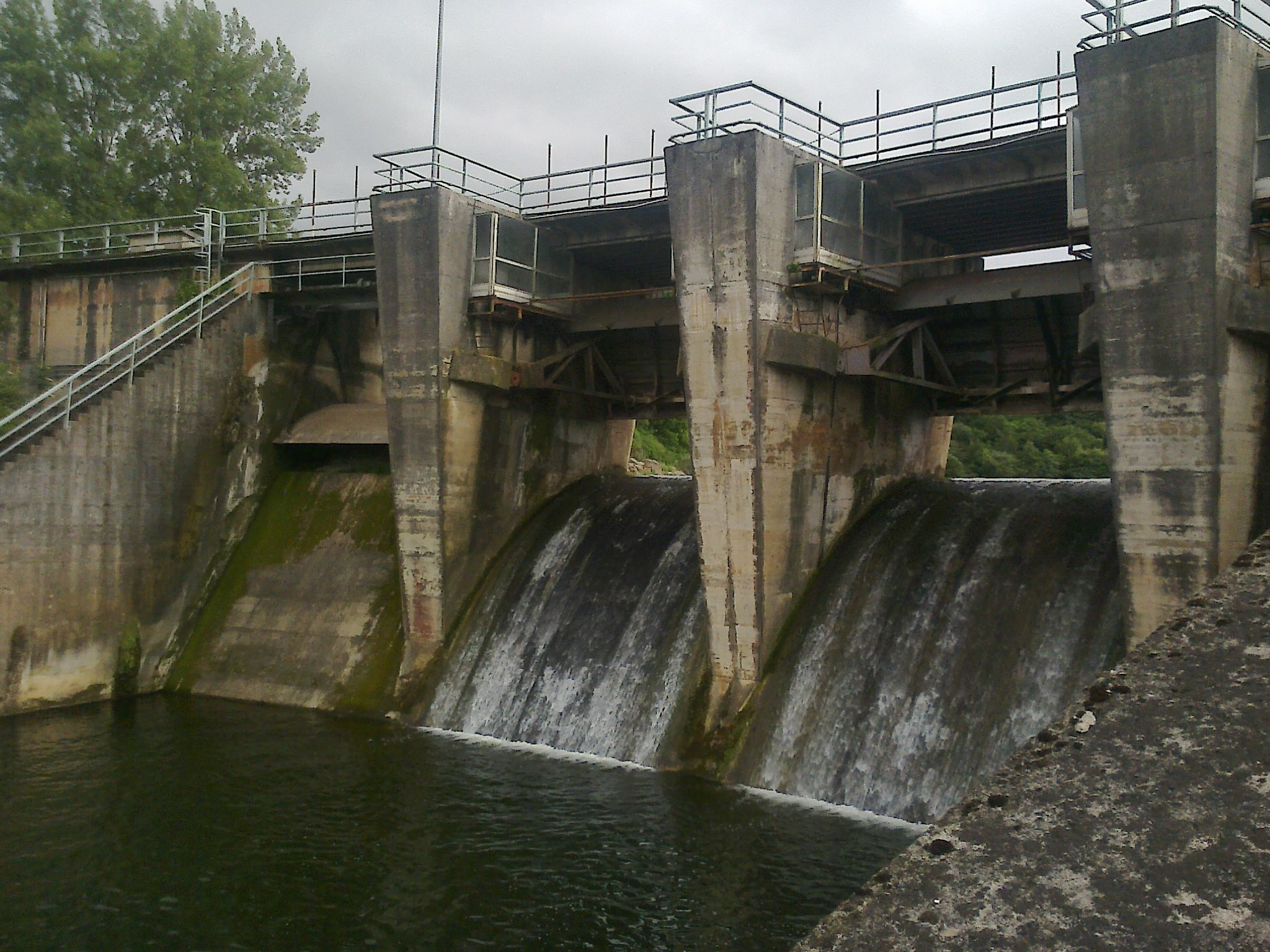
- Dam of San Andrés de los Tacones
- Native name: Rio Aboño (Spanish)

Location
- Country: Spain
- State: Asturias
- Region: Carreño; Llanera

Physical characteristics
- Source
  - coordinates: 43°27′7″N 5°43′5″W
- Mouth
  - location: Bay of Biscay
  - coordinates: 43°34′7″N 5°42′42″W
- Length: 9.7 km (6.0 mi)

The Aboño (Spanish pronunciation: [aboɲʝo], historically Avono) is a river in northern Spain flowing through the Autonomous Community of Asturias.
