= Corvera de Asturias =

Corvera de Asturias Corvera (Asturian)
- Municipality
- Corvera de Asturias
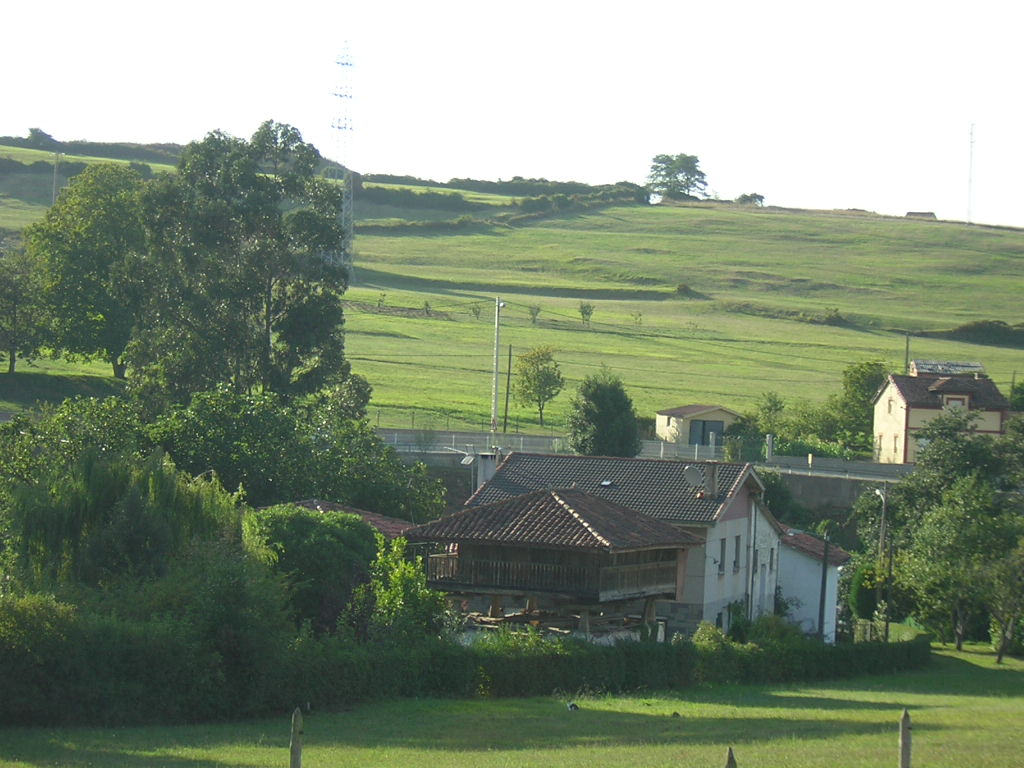
- View of El Molín, one of the neighbourhood of the parish of Molleda, Corvera d'Asturies).

- Flag Coat of arms

- Location in Spain
- Coordinates: 43°30′N 5°54′W
- Country: Spain
- Autonomous community: Asturias
- Province: Asturias
- Comarca: Avilés
- Judicial district: Avilés
- Capital: Nubledo

Government
  - Alcalde: Iván Fernández García (PSOE)

Area
  - Total: 46.01 km^{2} (17.76 sq mi)
- Highest elevation: 362 m (1,188 ft)

Population (2025-01-01)
  - Total: 15,785
  - Density: 343.1/km^{2} (888.6/sq mi)
- Demonym(s): corverano, corverana
- Time zone: UTC+1 (CET)
  - Summer (DST): UTC+2 (CEST)
- Postal code: 33404 (Los Campos and Las Vegas) and 33416
- Website: www.ayto-corvera.es

Corvera de Asturias (Asturian: Corvera) is a municipality in the principality of Asturias in northern Spain. It shares a boundary to the north with Avilés and Gozón; to the east with Carreño and Gijón; to the south with Llanera and Illas and to the west with Castrillón. Its capital, Nubledo, has a population of more than 300 residents.

Corvera is the most eastern of the four counties forming the Great County of Aviles. It is situated in the northern-central area of the Principality of Asturias. It is 45.48 km^{2} (17.56 sq mi) in size and has a population of over 16,000 residents, mainly concentrated in the villages of Las Vegas and Los Campos. The main roads to get there are AS-19, AS-17 and A-8. The A-8 proceeds to Tabaza (Carreño) and the shopping centre Parque Astur.

== History ==
Historical population
Year	Pop.	±%
1991	17,167	—
1996	16,502	−3.9%
2001	15,885	−3.7%
2004	15,924	+0.2%
2007	15,723	−1.3%

The history of Corvera is linked to the history of Avilés, being a natural extension of it proceeding inland.

Several prehistorical settlements have been found in the county. The most interesting are those belonging to the Astures. They left their traces in two "castros" (fortified villages) that have not been excavated yet: Pico Castiello in Molleda and Castiellu in Camina, Solís. These "castros" were most probably used by the Romans, and we have some traces of their presence there, some of them so important as the Estela Antropomorfa de Molleda (human-shaped figure), nowadays can be seen in the Archaeological Museum of Asturias.In the 10th century the villages of the county of Aviles became together to form an only geographical entity known as the "Alfoz de Gauzzone"; but it is not until the year 1120 that we find the first written references to the county of Corvera in the Liber Testamentorum. In the 15th century, Corvera already appears as a county, independent of Aviles.

In the 19th century, the landscape of the area was mainly agricultural. The population centres were villages with a certain prestige in which we can still see palaces and Indiano houses. In the mid 20th century the iron and steel industry starts functioning in Avilés and the old rural centres begin to shelter the thousands of immigrants working for ENSIDESA (current Arcelor modifying the aspect of the county, due to the building of new districts near the factories, such as Tresona and Les Vegues.

== Government ==
Municipal elections
Party/List	1979	1983	1987	1991	1995	1999	2003	2007	2011	2015
FSA-PSOE	7	12	9	8	8	8	3	5	6	10
PCE / IU-BA / IU-The Greens	4	2	2	2	3	3	3	2	3	2
AP / PP		3	2	2	4	4	3	3	1	1
USPC							7	7	4	1
FAC									3	1
URAS / URAS-PAS						2	1	0	0	0
UCD / CDS	6		4	1						
CIAINCO				4	2					
Somos										2
C's										0
Total	17	17	17	17	17	17	17	17	17	17

== Industries ==
- Steel plant of Aceralia between Avilés and Corvera of Asturias.
- Chemical plant of Du Pont.
- Chemical plant of Fertiberia.

== Parishes ==
The area of Corvera comprises seven parishes (administrative divisions):

1. Trasona
2. Las Vegas
3. Los Campos
4. Villa
5. Molleda
6. Cancienes
7. Solís

== Partnerships ==
- Praia (Cape Verde)
- Sal (Cape Verde)
- Arroyo Naranjo (Cuba)
- Maldonado (Uruguay)

== See also ==
- List of municipalities in Asturias
