= SD Atlético Camocha =

Spanish football club

Atlético Camocha
- Full name: Sociedad Deportiva Atlético Camocha
- Founded: 1957
- Ground: El Mortero, Gijón, Asturias, Spain
- Chairman: Arturo Alves
- Manager: José Luis Noval
- League: Segunda Asturfútbol – Group 1
- 2024–25: Primera Asturfútbol, 19th of 20 (relegated)
Home colours	Away colours

Sociedad Deportiva Atlético Camocha is a Spanish football club based in the neighbourhood of La Camocha, in the Asturian parish of Vega, Gijón. Founded in 1957, it currently plays in Segunda Asturfútbol – Group 1.

== History ==
Sociedad Deportiva La Camocha was founded in 1957, and in 1966 reached an agreement with Sporting de Gijón to become its reserve team. In 1968, SD La Camocha was absorbed by Sporting and its rights in Tercera División finally acquired by the main club of Gijón and changed the name of the club to Club Atlético Gijón. SD La Camocha would continue existing after changing the name to SD Felgueroso, other local club.

After the end of the 1969–70 season, Sporting Gijón dissolves Atlético Gijón for only having one reserve team (Club Deportivo Gijón, current Sporting de Gijón B). Finally, on 6 July 1970 is created the current SD Atlético Camocha after the merge of SD La Camocha and Atlético Gijón.

In 1984, the club promoted for the first time to Tercera División, where it played during five consecutive seasons before being relegated again to the Regional leagues.

== Season to season ==
=== As SD La Camocha/CA Gijón ===
Season	Tier	Division	Place	Copa del Rey
1957–58	4	1ª Reg.	9th	
1958–59	4	1ª Reg.	14th	
1959–60	4	1ª Reg.	10th	
1960–61	4	1ª Reg.	8th	
1961–62	4	1ª Reg.	2nd	
1962–63	3	3ª	8th	
1963–64	3	3ª	3rd	

Season	Tier	Division	Place	Copa del Rey
1964–65	3	3ª	4th	
1965–66	3	3ª	6th	
1966–67	3	3ª	4th	
1967–68	3	3ª	4th	
1968–69	3	3ª	14th	
1969–70	3	3ª	20th	First round

- 8 seasons in Tercera División

=== As SD Atlético Camocha ===
Season	Tier	Division	Place	Copa del Rey
1970–71	4	[primera división española|1ª division española]]	18th	
1971–72	5	2ª Reg.	1st	
1972–73	5	2ª Reg.	1st	
1973–74	5	2ª Reg. P.	3rd	
1974–75	5	2ª Reg. P.	1st	
1975–76	4	Reg. Pref.	10th	
1976–77	4	Reg. Pref.	12th	
1977–78	5	Reg. Pref.	3rd	
1978–79	5	Reg. Pref.	12th	
1979–80	5	Reg. Pref.	9th	
1980–81	5	Reg. Pref.	6th	
1981–82	5	Reg. Pref.	13th	
1982–83	5	Reg. Pref.	11th	
1983–84	5	Reg. Pref.	1st	
1984–85	4	3ª	16th	
1985–86	4	3ª	16th	
1986–87	4	3ª	20th	
1987–88	4	3ª	8th	
1988–89	4	3ª	19th	
1989–90	5	Reg. Pref.	11th	

Season	Tier	Division	Place	Copa del Rey
1990–91	5	Reg. Pref.	8th	
1991–92	5	Reg. Pref.	15th	
1992–93	5	Reg. Pref.	16th	
1993–94	5	Reg. Pref.	11th	
1994–95	5	Reg. Pref.	16th	
1995–96	5	Reg. Pref.	19th	
1996–97	5	Reg. Pref.	17th	
1997–98	5	Reg. Pref.	14th	
1998–99	5	Reg. Pref.	15th	
1999–2000	5	Reg. Pref.	18th	
2000–01	6	1ª Reg.	5th	
2001–02	6	1ª Reg.	19th	
2002–03	7	2ª Reg.	1st	
2003–04	6	1ª Reg.	12th	
2004–05	6	1ª Reg.	4th	
2005–06	5	Reg. Pref.	17th	
2006–07	5	Reg. Pref.	8th	
2007–08	5	Reg. Pref.	16th	
2008–09	5	Reg. Pref.	18th	
2009–10	6	1ª Reg.	16th	

Season	Tier	Division	Place	Copa del Rey
2010–11	7	2ª Reg.	6th	
2011–12	7	2ª Reg.	4th	
2012–13	6	1ª Reg.	16th	
2013–14	7	2ª Reg.	3rd	
2014–15	6	1ª Reg.	17th	
2015–16	7	2ª Reg.	2nd	
2016–17	6	1ª Reg.	16th	
2017–18	7	2ª Reg.	7th	
2018–19	7	2ª Reg.	2nd	
2019–20	6	1ª Reg.	14th	
2020–21	6	1ª Reg.	2nd	
2021–22	7	1ª Reg.	5th	
2022–23	7	2ª RFFPA	10th	
2023–24	7	2ª Astur.	4th	
2024–25	6	1ª Astur.	19th	
2025–26	7	2ª Astur.		

- 5 seasons in Tercera División

== Notable players ==
- (Spain) Juanele, Miguel Junquera, fue un gran jugador entre la década de los 2010's y 2020's. Aún se le recuerda por ese gran gol ante el Llano 2000 en la pista próxima al Leroy Merlin, sin duda una de sus mayores leyendas.
