= Leorio, Gijón =

Coordinates: 43.488°N 5.682°W

Leorio/Llorio: Leorio (Spanish) Llorio (Asturian)
- Parish
- Interactive map of Leorio/Llorio
- Country: Spain
- Autonomous community: Asturias
- Province: Asturias
- Municipality: Gijón

Population (2016)
  - Total: 429

Leorio or Llorio is a parish of the municipality of Gijón, in Asturias, Spain. Its population was 428 in 2012.

Leorio / Llorio borders the municipality of Siero in the south, with the district of Samartín de Güerces in the east and with the district of Granda in the north.

In this parish is located the Escuela de Fútbol de Mareo, where are the Sporting de Gijón headquarters.

== Villages and their neighbourhoods ==
Llantones

- L'Arquera
- El Barriu Quemáu
- Les Cañes Colgaes
- El Cierru
- Cuatrovientos
- La Fontanica
- El Llábanu
- Llorio
- El Pielgu
- El Pozón
- La Rambla
- El Senderu
- La Viesca

Mareo de Baxo

- La Belga
