= Vega, Gijón =

Vega
- Parish
- Interactive map of Vega
- Country: Spain
- Autonomous community: Asturias
- Province: Asturias
- Municipality: Gijón

Population (2016)
  - Total: 3,484

Vega is a parish of the municipality of Gijón / Xixón, in Asturias, Spain. Its population was 3,484 in 2016.

Vega is a residential and rural area, bordering with the districts of Granda, Castiello Bernueces, Santurio, Caldones, Llavandera, and Samartín de Güerces.

The La Camocha coal mine (closed 2007) was located in Vega. The mining town of La Camocha (including El Vaticano and Ciudad Virginia barrios) is located in the mine surroundings.

== Villages and their neighbourhoods ==
=== Aroles ===
- La Camocha

=== Vega de Baxo ===
- Ciudad Virginia / Los Bloques
- La Iglesia
- La Piquiella
  - La Parada
- Les Prairíes

=== Vega de Riba ===
- Camarranes
- Paniceres
- La Pomarada
- El Vaticano
