= Sanctuary of Nuestra Señora de Contrueces =

Church in Gijón, Spain

Sanctuary of Our Lady of Contrueces
- Santuario de Nuestra Señora de Contrueces
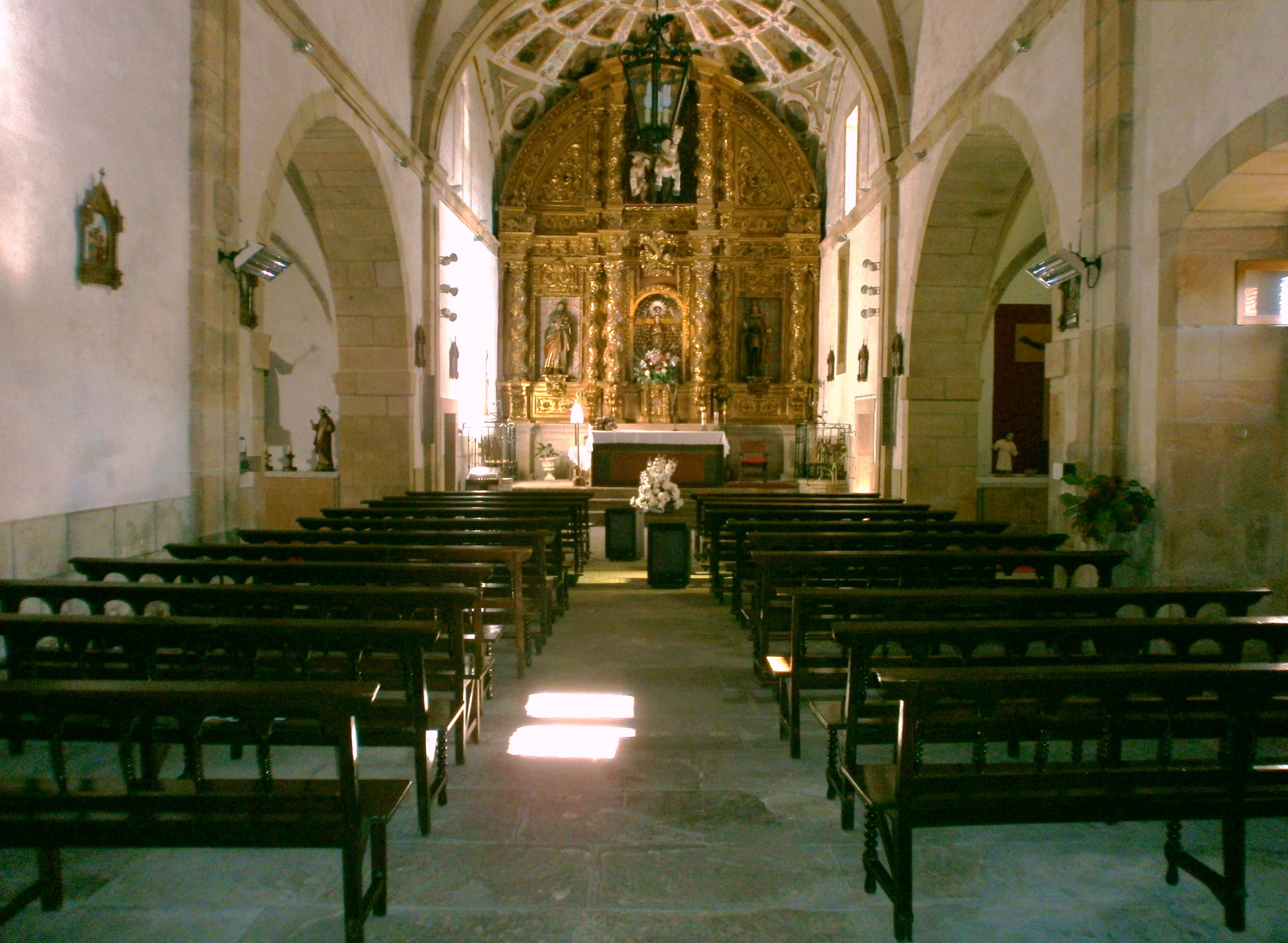
- Interior of the sanctuary
- Sanctuary of Our Lady of Contrueces
- 43°30′56″N 5°39′48″W
- Location: Gijón
- Country: Spain
- Denomination: Catholic Church
- Religious order: Claretians

History
- Dedication: Our Lady of Contrueces

Architecture
- Architect: Gonzalo de Güemes Bracamonte
- Style: Herrerian
- Groundbreaking: 1638
- Completed: 1660

Administration
- Diocese: Oviedo

The Sanctuary of Our Lady of Contrueces is a Catholic church located in the autonomous community of Asturias (Spain), in the southern part of the urban area of Gijón, within the neighborhood of Contrueces. It stands as a significant landmark in Gijón’s history, as the Virgin venerated in this temple was regarded by many residents of Gijón as the city’s patroness for numerous years.

The earliest documents attesting to the existence of this church date back to the early 10th century and are found in the Book of Testaments, which includes a document signed on August 28, 905, in Cortuloces—a suburb of Gijón—for the benefit of the church of Ourense. This document records the confirmation by King Alfonso III and his wife Jimena. Further references to this church appear in the Diploma of Ourense from the 10th century (or possibly the 11th), as well as in documents related to the Monastery of San Vicente, the writings of Sampiro, and other sources.

From the 12th to the 16th centuries, a period of obscurity ensues, with no surviving records. In 1636, the local residents highlighted the need to establish a fair in Contrueces, arguing that it would both encourage devotion to the Virgin and yield significant economic benefits by boosting transactions involving the buying and selling of horses, cattle, and mules. These activities took place around the sanctuary, capitalizing on the large influx of the faithful. The sanctuary’s distance from the city center led many devotees to visit the chapel of the Virgin of Begoña, which eventually became regarded as the patroness of the Fuente Vieja neighborhood in central Gijón, later renamed the “Begoña neighborhood.” Nevertheless, many Gijón residents continue to visit the Sanctuary of the Virgin of Contrueces on the Sunday following the feast of the Virgin of Begoña.

Opposite the sanctuary, approximately 50 meters away, stands a palace that has served variously as an asylum, seminary, and children’s school. During times when it stood vacant, it was frequented by the writer and politician of the Enlightenment era, Gaspar Melchor de Jovellanos, who found it an ideal setting for writing, meditating, and praying. Today, it functions as a primary school managed by the Claretians.

== Location ==
The sanctuary is situated in the southeastern part of Gijón, in the Contrueces neighborhood, along a road known as the “Bishop’s Highway,” the former royal road from Gijón to Oviedo. According to Luis Miguel Piñera, the road’s name derives from the bishops of Oviedo, who maintained an occasional residence at the sanctuary’s palace when visiting Gijón.

Built atop a highly visible hill, the sanctuary was described by Jovellanos as offering a view of nearly the entire city. It belongs to the Archdiocese of Oviedo and is located on land owned since 1947 by the Claretian missionaries. This sanctuary holds profound significance as a place of worship in the history of Gijón and its surrounding areas.

== History ==
=== The diploma of Ourense: foundation ===
The present church appears to be a successor to an earlier one built in the Asturian pre-Romanesque style, with documentary evidence preserved in a parchment written in cursive Visigothic script in Latin between the 10th and 11th centuries. This document is housed in the Regional Archive of Galicia in A Coruña. Scholars Barrau-Dihigo and Antonio Floriano Cumbreño affirm its authenticity, noting its inclusion in the Book of Testaments of Oviedo. Signed on August 28, 905, in Cortuloces, a suburb of Gijón, it benefits the church of Ourense and records the confirmation by King Alfonso III and his wife Jimena of donations made by their predecessors to the church of Oviedo, along with additional contributions, including the church of “Saint Mary of Contrueces”:

... civitatem Gegionem cum eclesiis que intus sunt, cum omni integritate sea. Et foris muros eclessiam sancti Iuliani et ecclesiam santi Thome de Vadones cum sua villa, et eclessiam sancte Marie de Coltroces per suos terminos, ad occidentalem partem...

According to this, the king had donated to the church of Oviedo “the entire city of Gijón with its churches and possessions,” including the church of Saint Peter, which remained the sole parish of the town until the 19th century, as well as three churches outside the city walls: those of Saint Julian, Saint Thomas of Bahones with its estate, and Saint Mary of Contrueces to the west.

The document, featuring expressions typical of that era yet affirming the faith of King Alfonso III and his wife Jimena, begins as follows:

In the name of the Lord God and our Savior Jesus Christ,... Alfonso and Jimena, we pray that you will deign to accept our humble vow and our humble offering... [and after recalling the conquest of Ourense by his father Ordoño I, an important part of the donation, he concludes]. ... This testament was made and confirmed on the fifth day before the calends of September, in the course of the era..., in the thirty-fifth year of our reign, happily in the glorious name of God, residing in our possession of Cortuloces, a suburb of the city of Gijón.

==== Debate over the diploma’s authenticity ====
Nonetheless, the diploma is not free from doubts regarding its authenticity. At least four researchers have examined it, reaching varied conclusions:

- Spanish historian and critic Rubén García Álvarez deems it “a forgery from the late 11th century or early 12th century.”
- French Hispanist Barrau-Dihigo believes it has been altered but is fundamentally authentic and dates to around 900.
- Spanish historian Claudio Sánchez-Albornoz, an adopted son of Oviedo and recipient of the Prince of Asturias Award for Communication and Humanities, initially defended its authenticity but later expressed reservations.
- Asturian paleographer Antonio Floriano Cumbreño conducted an analysis, concluding: “For us, the so-called pseudo-original from A Coruña is an imitative copy of an authentic original, with no alterations beyond some changes in the order of subscriptions.” He added: “... the original we studied, dating back to the 10th century and in genuine Visigothic script, would predate by more than a hundred years the skills learned from French monks by our codex makers, diplomatically post-1100.”

A delicate and challenging issue is the evolution of the place name from “Cortuloces” to “Coltroces” and later to “Contrueces,” a linguistic shift implying a lengthy timespan. The original Latin text reads:

In nomine Domini Dei et Salvatoris nostri Iesu Christi ...nos exigui famuli vestri ADEFONSUS princeps et ego ISCEMENA oramus ut hunc nostrum votum dignetis suscipere pia oblatione ... Factum atque restauratum hoc testamentum sub die V kalendas septembris discurrente era D. ... (torn), anno feliciter in Dei nomine glorie regni nostri XXXV, comorantes in possesione nostra CORTULOCES, suburbio civitatis Gegionensis.

— Diploma.

=== Diploma of the Monastery of San Vicente ===
The Monastery of San Vicente could be dubbed “the Sahagún of Asturias,” for just as the Sahagún Monastery exerted influence and held possessions across the Kingdom of León, San Vicente did likewise over much of the Kingdom of Asturias. Within the monastery’s diplomatic collection is a document dated June 8, 1056, concerning a donation of rural and urban estates in the Gijón area, which states:

Didago Osóriz, as executor of the will of his mother, Lady María, ceded to Legundia Gundemaris the estate of Taranes in the Ledorio valley, together with the churches of Saint Felix and Saint Cyprian.

— Diploma of the Monastery of San Vicente

This text provides sufficient details to identify and locate places and estates in the Gijón valley. It is particularly valuable for clarifying the etymology and location of “Contrueces,” as it mentions the village of “Coltroces” among the boundaries of these properties. Thus, by 1046, the site was already known by that name and precisely situated south of Gijón. Through linguistic evolution, “Cortuloces” transitioned to “Coltroces.” This term also appears in writings by Bishop Pelayo II from the mid-12th century. Subsequently, “Coltroces” evolved into “Cultrocis” and eventually the current “Contrueces,” though alternative etymological theories exist: Menéndez Valdés suggests it derives from “Contra-Ceares,” Somoza proposes “Col de Roces,” and Floriano Cumbreño offers “Controcio.”

=== Diploma of the Cathedral of Oviedo ===
In the first half of the 12th century, the “Oviedo scriptorium” displayed considerable activity, serving the bishopric by producing deeds of sale, wills, and donations, while relegating the writing of historical accounts and chronicles to a secondary role. Bishop Pelayo II himself authored many of these chronicles. A significant number have survived, notably the lavish Book of Testaments, considered the bishopric’s “Cartulary.” Like many others, this bishopric was influenced by foreign innovations: first, the script reform initiated at the Cluny Abbey, transitioning from Visigothic script to Carolingian minuscule; second, an unfortunate practice of forgery, which was easier with Carolingian script than with Visigothic.

The Book of Testaments records numerous donations from the “Great King” to the Cathedral of Oviedo. Pertinent to this topic—Gijón’s donations—only the Church of San Pedro existed within the town, serving as the sole parish church until the 19th century. Outside the walls were the churches of Saint Thomas of Bahones in Granda, Saint Julian in Roces, and Saint Mary of Contrueces. Beyond this church, the king donated extensive lands and estates in its vicinity, and in defining their boundaries and roads, the Latin text reads: “... ecclesiam Sancte Marie de Coltroces.” As other sources cited earlier indicate the king “resided” in Contrueces, it is highly probable a church existed nearby.

However, doubts persist, and sometimes certainty of forgery casts this document as apocryphal. Scholars opine as follows: Sánchez Albornoz calls it “monstrous,” Barrau-Dihigo deems it a reworked document, and Floriano Cumbreño and Emilio Sáez concur with these assessments.

=== The chronicle of Sampiro ===
Documentation of this church in Contrueces also appears in the Chronicle of Sampiro, named after its author Sampiro, a native of Zamora, a cleric, intellectual, and politician of the Kingdom of León, notary of that court, and later bishop of Astorga. This chronicle continues the Chronicle of Albelda, spanning from 866, when Alfonso III’s reign began, to 982, recounting the death of King Ramiro III. The Chronicle of Sampiro survives in two versions: one by Bishop Pelayo and another by a monk from the Abbey of Santo Domingo de Silos. The latter rewrites the original text without changes, while critics consider Sampiro’s version an original text with numerous inserted phrases. However, the term “Contrueces” appears only in Pelayo’s version, cited below.

Additional documents related to Contrueces include one described by Jovellanos in his “collection,” dated 1263, stored in the Cathedral of Oviedo archives, which states:

Ruy Fdez, with his wife Theresa and his children, sold to María Bartholomé the sixth part of the land he owned in Contrueces and a piece of land in Boves.

— Gaspar Melchor de Jovellanos.

Another document, preserved in the same cathedral archive and dated 1344, attests to:

(...) an exchange between the Bishop and the Chapter, in which the Bishop gives to the Chapter the lands of San Juan de Tremañes in Gijón, with the church and its rights, namely San Pedro de Gijón, Natahoyo, Contrueces, San Félix de Caravedo, and in return the Chapter gives him the lands of San Esteban de Sograndio, with the church, the meadow, the olive grove...

— Cathedral of Oviedo Archive (1344).

If an Alfonsine church existed in Contrueces, its architectural style might be inferred from surviving examples cited by Pelayo in the Chronicle of Sampiro (noted above), following his mention of the reconstruction of the Church of Santiago:

(...) fecit etiam castella plurima et ecclesias multas, sicut hic subscriptum est: Interritorio Legionensi Lunam, Gordonem et Alvam: in Asruriis Tutelam et Gauzonem; intra Oveti castellum in palacium que est iuxta eum et palacia que sunt in valle Boidis, in Gegione in Cultrocis ecclesiam Sancte Marie et palacia, in Vellio ecclesiam Sancti Michaelis.

— Chronicle of Sampiro.

=== Gijón donations by Urraca and King Ferdinand II ===
Urraca, Queen of Castile and León, wife of Alfonso the Battler, through a brief document drafted by her chancellor, the Compostelan canon Martín, donated several estates in 1112, including the “entire portion of Gijón.” Though the document, preserved in the Book of Testaments of the Cathedral of Oviedo, does not explicitly mention the Contrueces estate, experts believe it was included in the donation.

Another donation to the Oviedo see by King Ferdinand II of León, son of Alfonso VII, in September 1178, explicitly mentions the Contrueces estate, stating:

(...) an offer, a grant, a donation to Bishop Rodrigo, for the good and extensive service he has rendered to the king.

A subsequent donation adds:

(...) quapropter ego rex domnus Fernandus, una cum filio meo rege domno Adefonso, eorum (Catholicorum regum) sequens vestigia, offero do et concedo CONTROZES illam hereditatem que iacet in Asturiis xusta mare, in valle illo qui vocatur Valdegijón, per omnes suos terminos novissimus et antiquos .smi. Salvatoris ecclesie et vobis dilectissimo nostro Roderico...pro remedio anime mee et omnium parentum meorum, et pro multo bono servitio... quod domnus Rodericus sepe el liberaliter presentavit...

The original document, still preserved, was drafted by Bernardo, the king’s notary, under the direction of Chancellor Pedro de Lauro, a Compostelan, and dated in Salamanca. Notably, the earlier “Coltroces” had become “Controces,” later evolving into “Contrueces” over the 14th century.

=== Other diplomas ===
Three additional diplomas from the 13th century also reference Contrueces:

- The first, held in the Monastery of San Vicente in Oviedo, among the Siero Council papers, drawer 11, records King Alfonso IX exchanging with the Monastery of San Vicente “... granting half of Contrueces in Siero (now Gijón) for the tithes of Bogies, La Felguera, San Juan de Miliayo, and San Saturnino,” attributed to the Valdediós Monastery. It is dated 1216.
- The second, from the “Libro Becerro de Valdediós,” was copied by Jovellanos for his Colección de Asturias. In it, the king donates the Contrueces estate to his former notary and chancellor Gonzalo Fernández. Dated July 11, 1217, it was signed in Calabanzos.
- The third, unpublished but mentioned by Canal Sánchez-Pagín, is preserved in the San Vicente archive, documenting a free and fraternal donation by the Valdediós monks to those of San Vicente of the Contrueces estate. Dated October 1235 in Valdediós.

In all three documents, the sanctuary’s location bears the same name: “CONTROZES,” as in King Ferdinand II’s diploma. Experts suggest that writing “Contrueces” instead of “Controzes” stems from a transcription error by Ciriaco M. Vigil, as the original text uses abbreviations: the ordinary abbreviation for Con as a “tail,” followed by tro as a “t” with a tail above, and finally the syllable zes. Experts variably question the authenticity of these documents, but collectively, they argue the set attests to an underlying truth.

=== From the 16th century onward ===
A dark period regarding documentation and news spans from the late 12th century to the 16th century. It is from the Gijón municipal records of 1567 that frequent mentions of the sanctuary, its festivals, and pilgrimages emerge. These records state explicitly:

In the area of Our Lady of Contrueces, a place designated by the Lords of Justice and Regiment of the City of Gijón to meet and discuss matters of the common good of the Republic, due to the plague that is currently afflicting the city of Gijón, for this reason they gather today, Sunday, the eighth day of December in the year of our Lord one thousand five hundred and sixty-six...

— Municipal Records of the Gijón Town Council.

In the 17th century, municipal records also provide details of construction work, specifically an agreement with masons for the new building, explicitly mentioning the old church slated for demolition. Signed in Gijón in 1645, it is recounted as follows:

And likewise, all the old structure presently in the old church, which is to be dismantled, the said masters shall dismantle at their own expense and remove it from the said church.

— Agreement of 1645.

Throughout its existence, the Contrueces temple has endured the consequences of historical events that shaped its current state. During the Spanish War of Independence, its strategic position overlooking Gijón led to its use as a powder magazine, posing risks to the temple’s integrity and contents. The Gijón Town Council’s municipal record states:

Powder and other war supplies sent from England are stored in the Contrueces Chapel, where the sacred vessels and other belongings of this sanctuary are protected.

— Municipal Record of the Gijón Town Council, 7 July 1808.

During the Spanish Civil War, the temple’s treatment was an exception to the norm for many churches, as it was one of the few in the city spared during the conflict.

== Structure and architecture ==
On May 10, 1636, the residents of Ceares signed a deed before notary Nicolás García de Jove concerning the fair or tax of “Our Lady of Contrueces,” primarily to foster devotion to the “glorious image of Our Lady” in her Contrueces dedication, a site frequented not only by Gijón’s townsfolk but by the entire Principality of Asturias. Two years later, in 1638, the sanctuary proved inadequate for the growing number of devotees and had fallen into ruin. Consequently, it was demolished, and an agreement was signed in Gijón to erect a new temple. Signed on February 20, 1638, the agreement involved “... on one part Alonso Ramírez Jove, resident and councilor of the town, and steward of the chapel, construction, and works of Our Lady of Contrueces, and on the other part, Francisco de Cubas and Simontio, master stonemasons...”.

The deed is highly detailed regarding the construction tasks: stone carving, transportation, scaffolding costs, and overall work. Notable too are the contributions of stonemasons from Trasmiera, renowned for prior works like the Convent of the Recoletas and others.

Details of the sanctuary

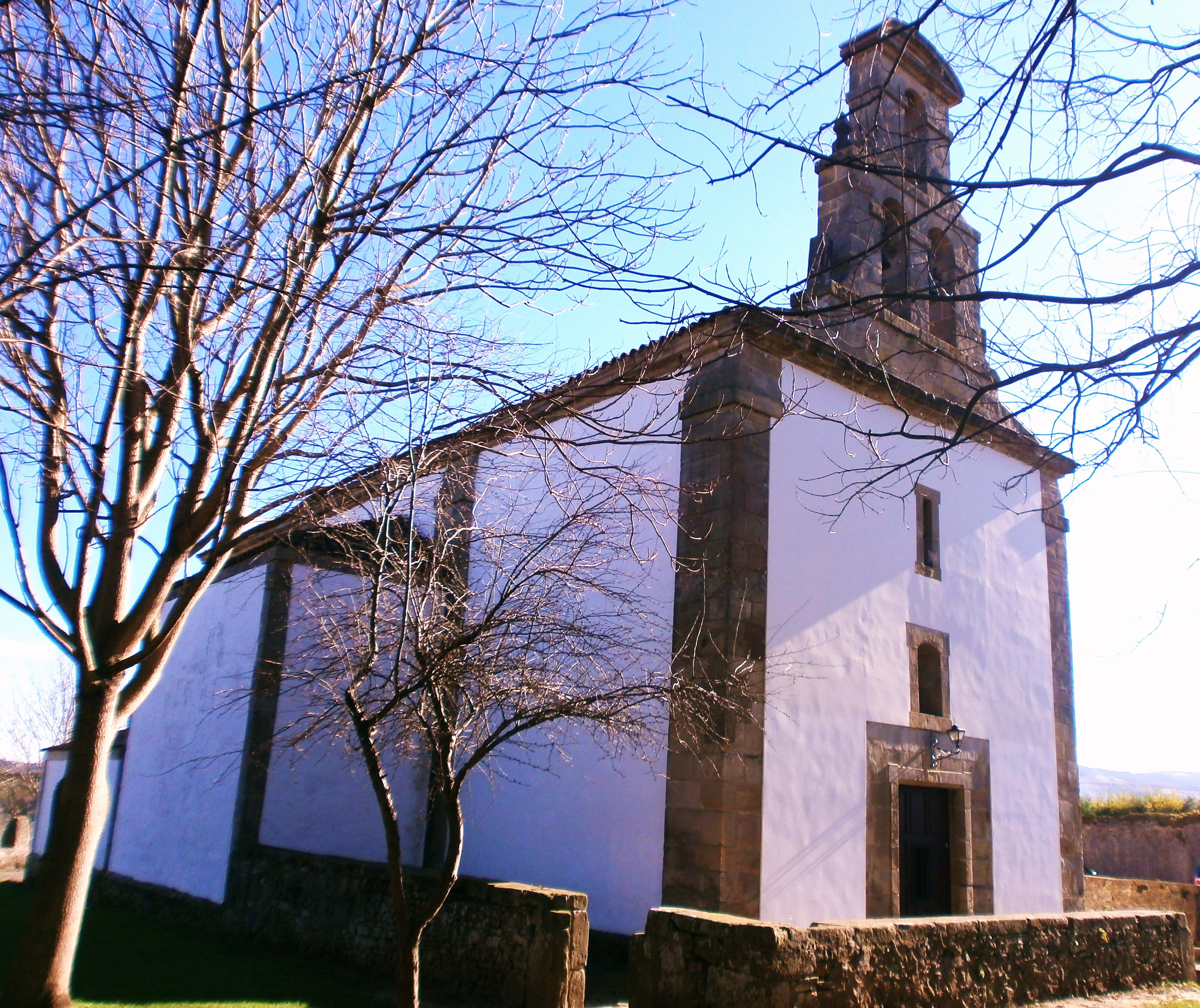
Northwestern facade

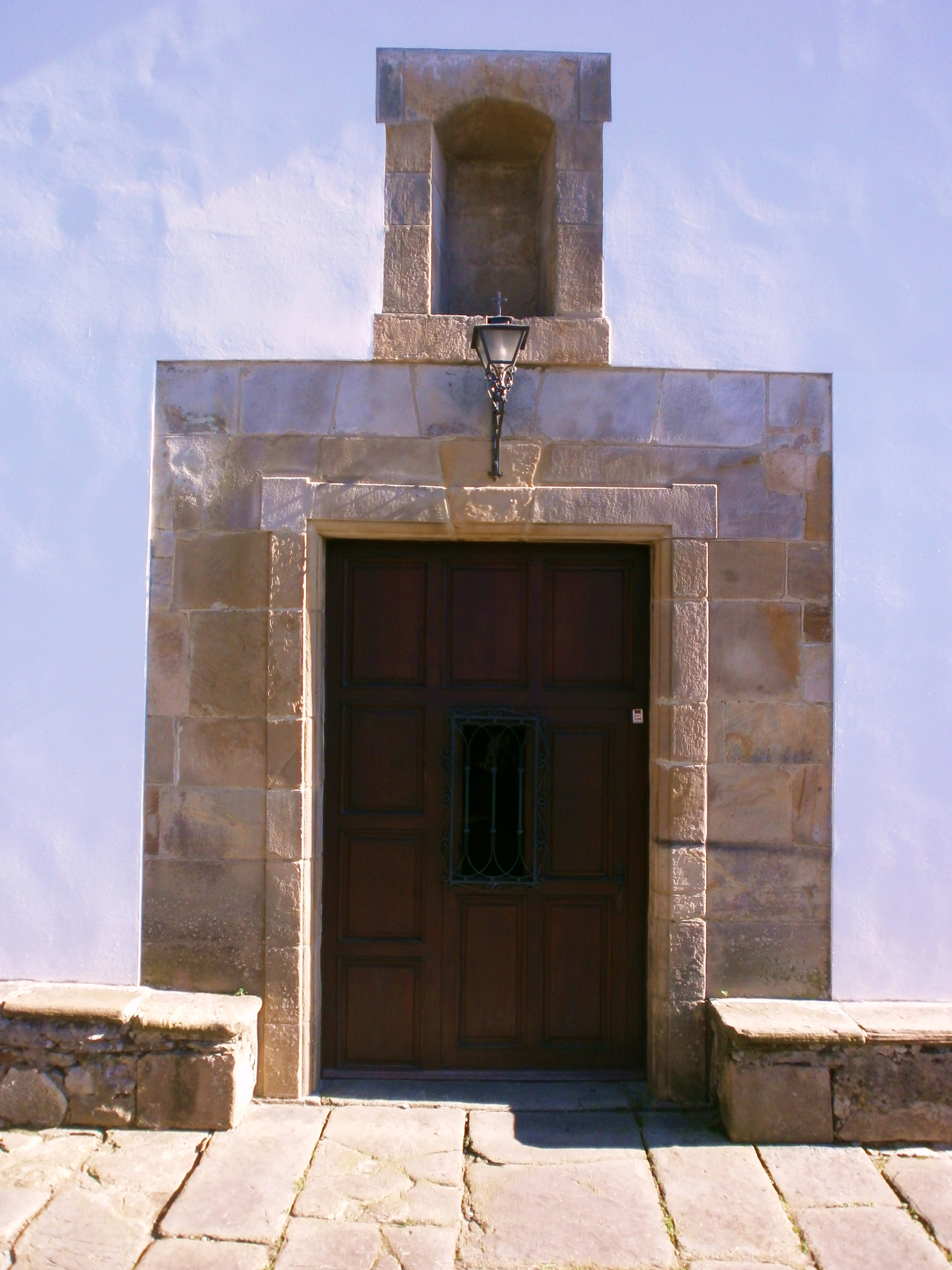
Main entrance

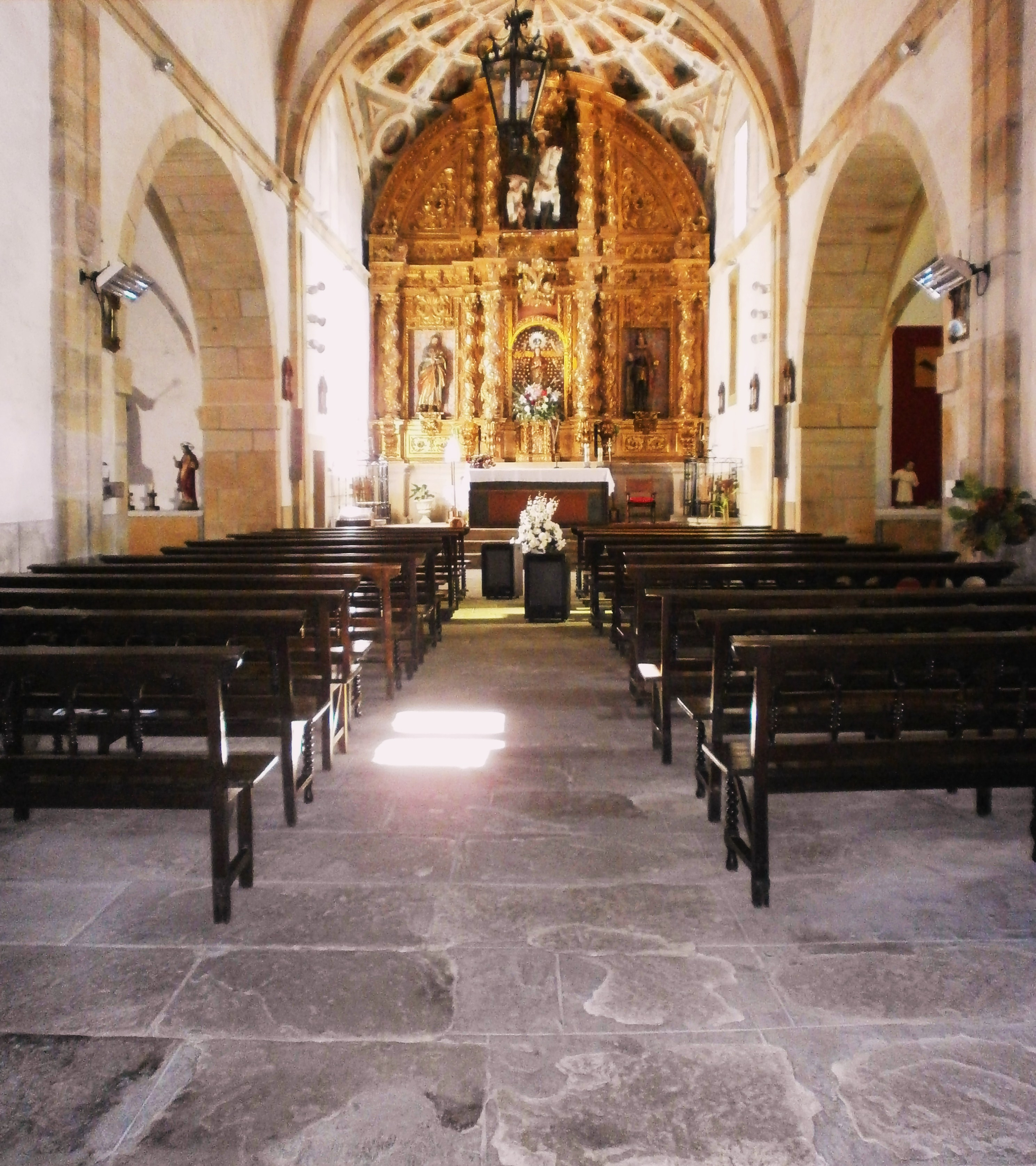
Main nave

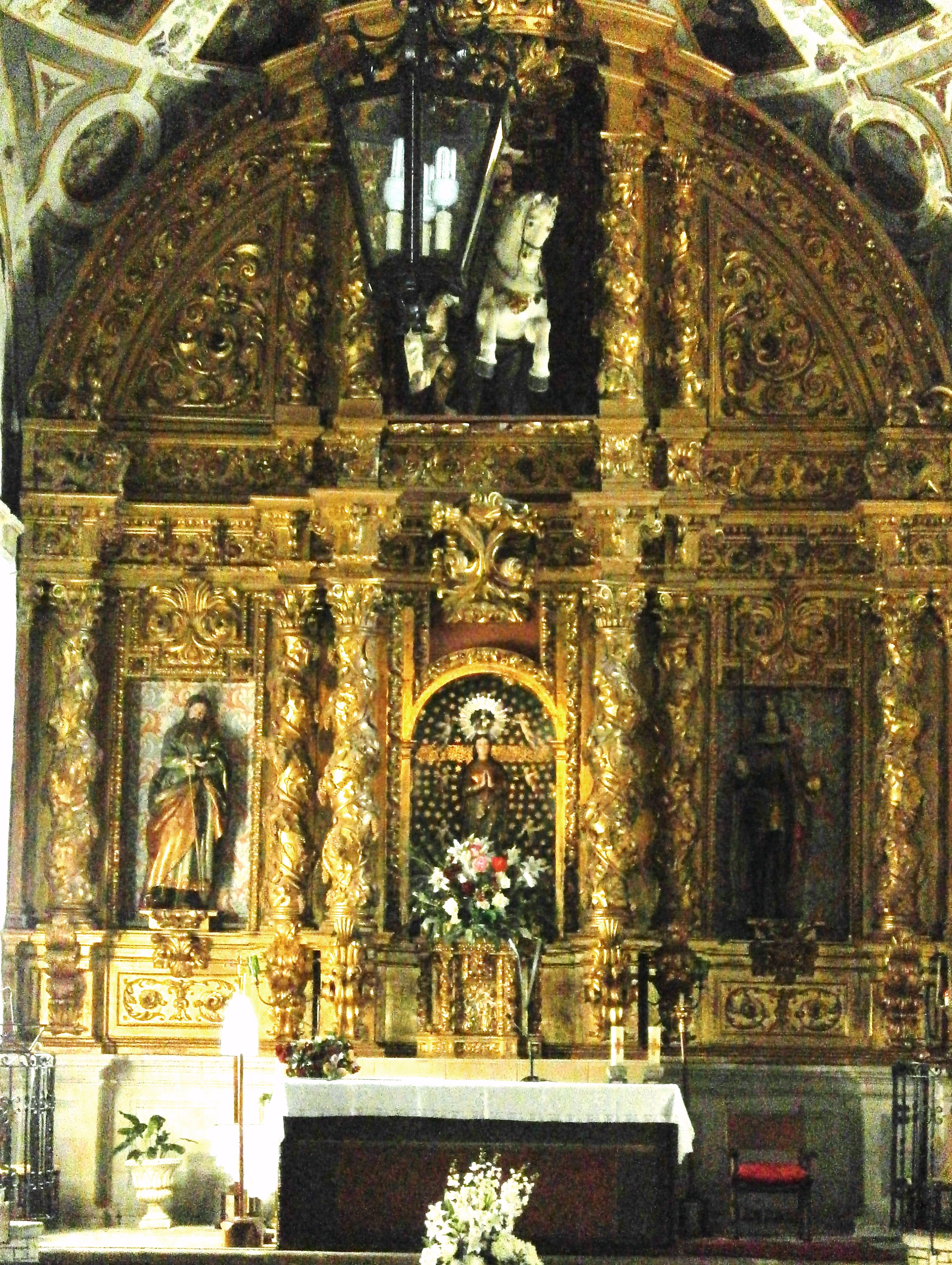
Altarpiece of the main altar

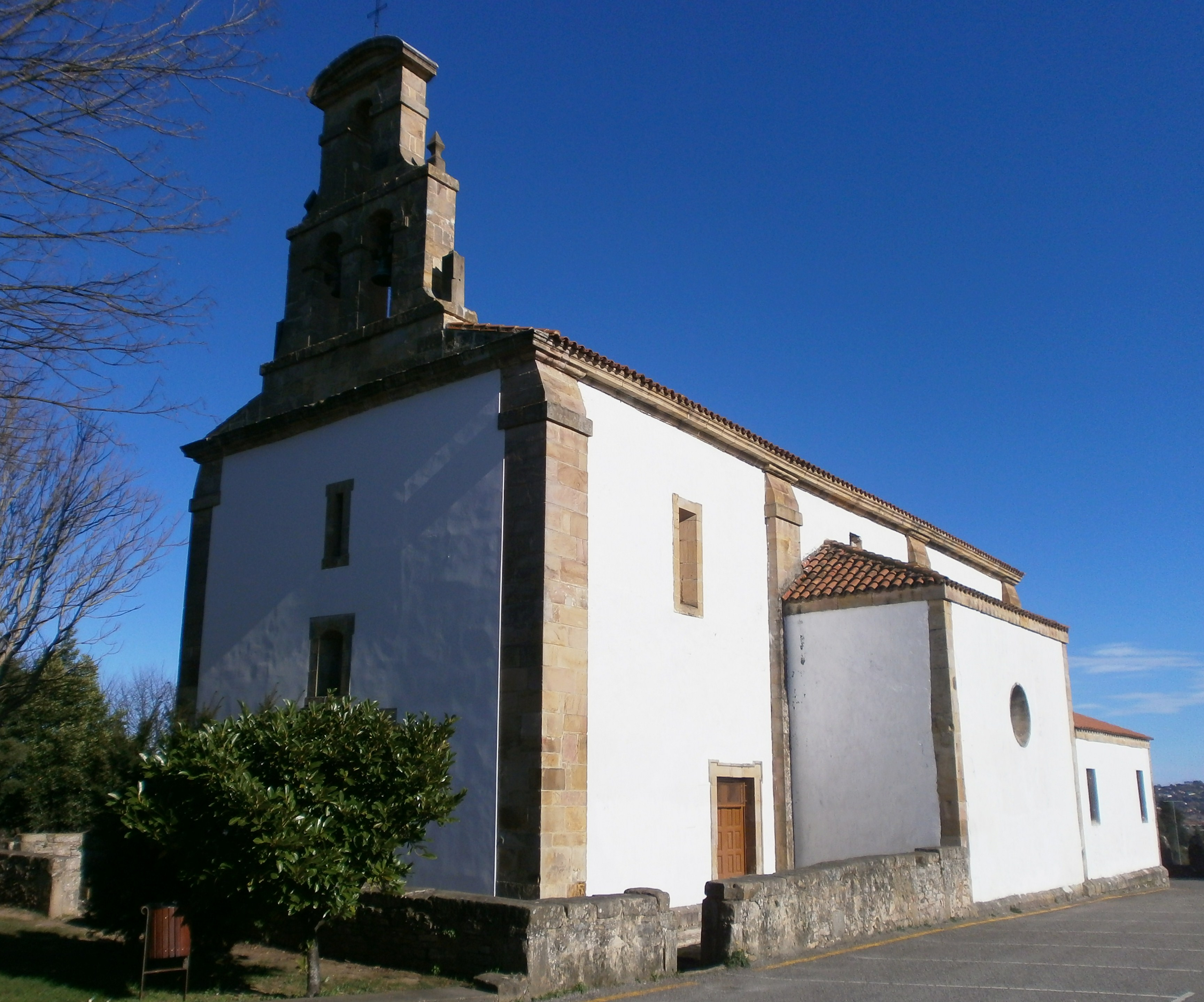
Southwestern facade

=== Construction history ===
Scholars generally agree that no known vestiges or remains of the earlier buildings survive. Somoza asserts: “Of one, the palace, and of the other, the church, nothing remains, as their foundations and inscriptions have vanished, leaving only faint traces of the latter among the shattered paving slabs of the portico. Close inspection reveals that their letters, especially the T and M, match those in the San Salvador de Deva inscription.”

Yet Bishop Pelayo II affirmed their existence in the early 12th century, attributing their foundation to King Alfonso III the Great in 905, deeming them “very ancient” even then. No further records exist until the 16th century, despite partial remarks by Gregorio Menéndez Valdés, reproduced below.

The “reckless Don Gregorio,” as Canal Sánchez-Pagín calls Gregorio Menéndez Valdés, states:

... tradition has it that this sanctuary and the palaces built by King Don Alfonso were located on an estate a little more than a hundred paces from the present site, where ancient ruins are often found to recall and confirm it". He adds, "At that time, the sanctuary was called Contra-Ceares, because the Romans had built a temple to the goddess Ceres there... and often tombs and Roman coins are found there.

In another book, Gregorio Menéndez Valdés continues describing the finds: “Very near the city of Gixa, in the Contrueces area, the foundations of the temple Nero ordered built to the goddess Ceres are still recognizable... and Roman coins were found while quarrying stone to rebuild my San Andrés de Cornellana house in Contrueces in 1700.” He further narrates: “In the Contrueces field, next to the temple we mentioned, my tenants Bernardo, Antonio, and Benito, while digging and quarrying stone, uncovered many coins from various Roman emperors. Five years ago, nearly four arrobas of these copper coins were found in this spot. They were sold to José Solís, a brassworker and Gijón resident, who melted them down.”

=== The construction ===
The architect tasked with the reconstruction plans was Gonzalo de Güemes Bracamonte, who designed them in the Herrerian style. Construction proceeded in phases, beginning with the main chapel, completed in 1640, as stipulated in the 1638 deed. Following the architect’s death, the bishopric commissioned a second architect, Fernando de la Huerta, to continue the work for 8,621 reales. Huerta, like Güemes, used stone from quarries in Bernueces and Los Caleros. By 1645, the high chapel and sacristy—positioned on the Gospel side—were finished, though the sacristy was relocated to the right side of the nave in 1756. The dome covering the presbytery is noteworthy, a flattened rosette-shaped dome featuring three diminishing rows of panels painted with cherubs and angels of the Passion in the inner two rings, and fourteen saintly figures in the outer ring, some canonized in the 17th century. From right to left, in a clockwise direction, these saints are: Saint Francis of Paola, Saint Francis Xavier, Saint Jane Frances de Chantal, Saint Benedict the Abbot, Saint Eulalia of Mérida, Saint Bonaventure, Saint Rose of Lima, Saint Vincent Ferrer, Saint Elizabeth of Portugal, Saint Thomas Aquinas, Saint Anthony of Padua, Saint Jerome, Saint Anne, and Saint Nicholas of Bari.

Per the “Protocol of the notary of Gijón, Nicolás García de Jove,” an agreement was reached between Captain Don Fernando Valdés, son of Pedro de Valdés, a resident of Roces and sergeant major of the Principality, and masons Simontio, Domingo García, and Solano, “residents of this town and the Suessa area, Trasmiera district.” Signed on October 29, 1645, it involved a land swap of roughly equal size—“three ox-days”—with the captain’s land being of higher quality and value, suggesting a gift to the religious institution. The bishopric readily endorsed it once the archpriest approved. The sanctuary was completed in 1660 with the chapter house’s finishing touches and inaugurated on June 24 that year. Juan Chamorro, a Caldones resident, handled the final chapter house work, including the tiling, which remains as he laid it; however, the chapter house suffered partial deterioration from subsequent sanitation works. The deed was signed and granted by Felipe Rato Argüelles following his predecessor’s death. Three years later, in 1663, the sanctuary employed not just a hermit, but also a chaplain, Pedro Morán, appointed by the bishopric.

Details of the sanctuary

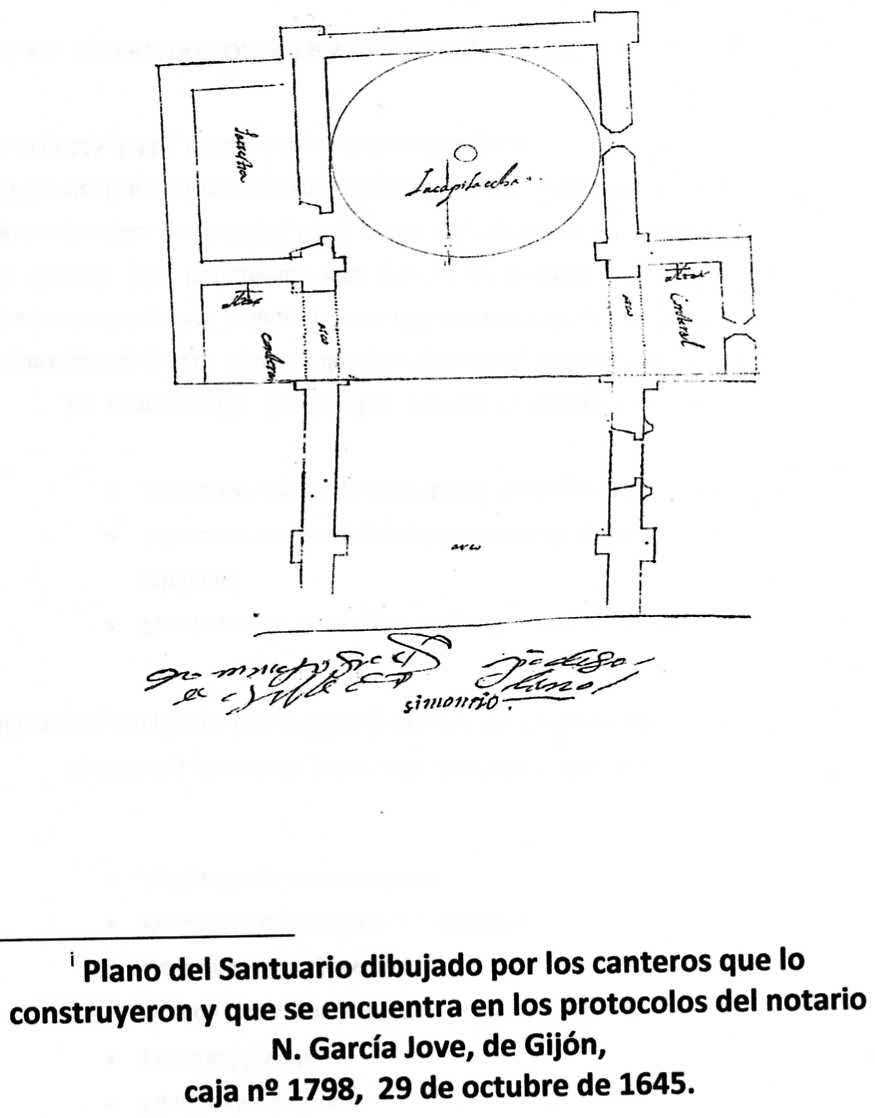
Old floor plan, 1645

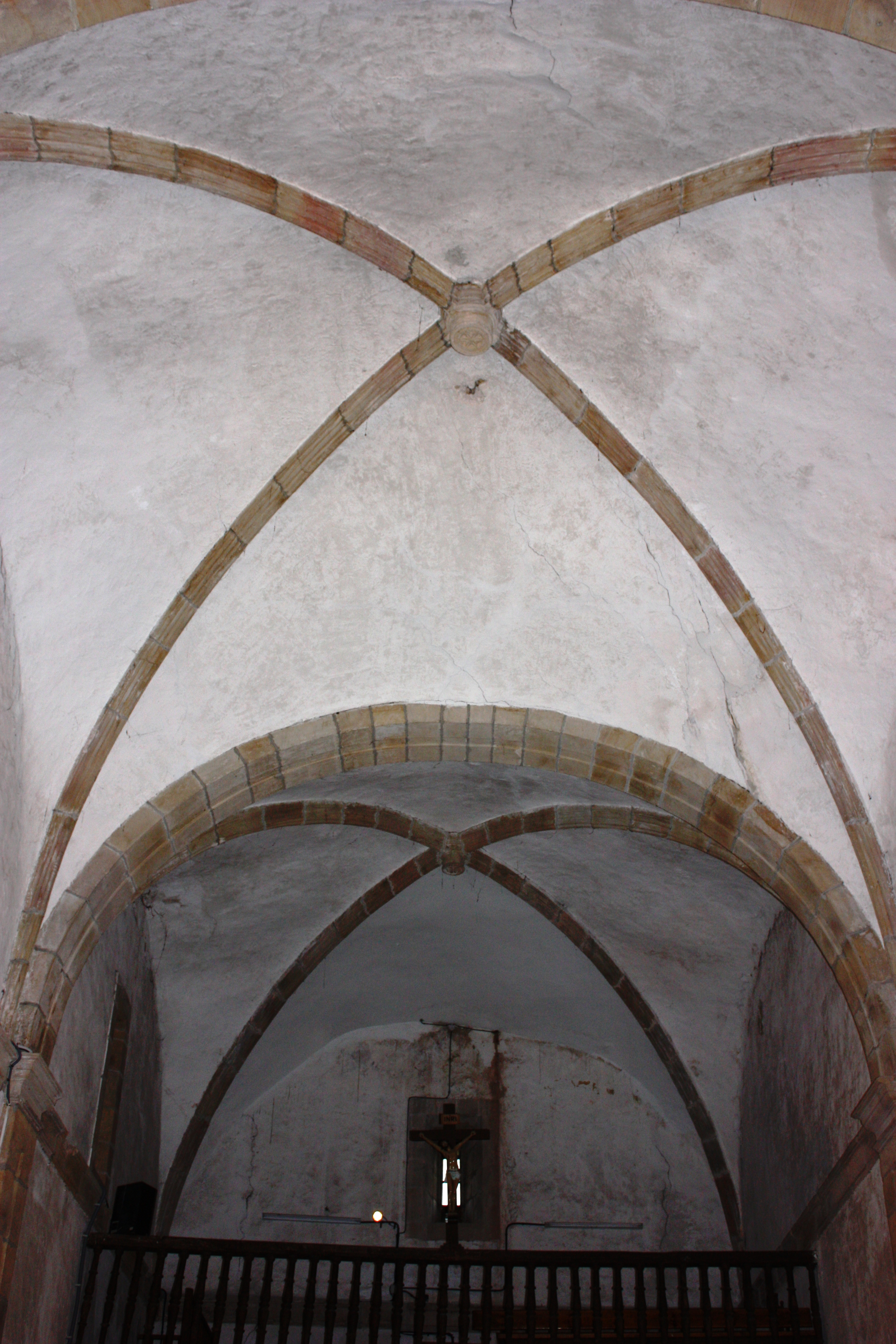
The first two sections with the choir in the back, raised

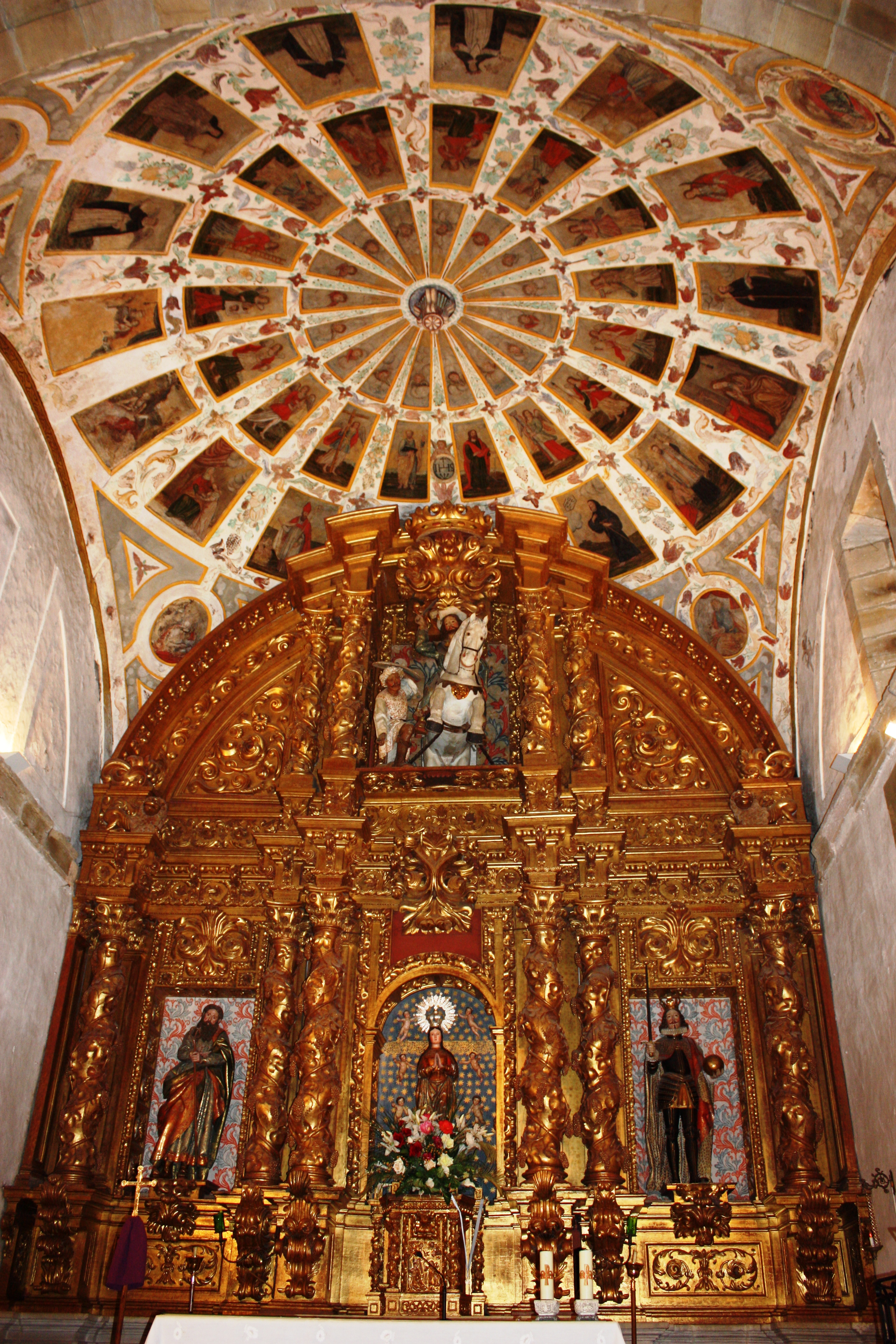
High altar under flattened dome

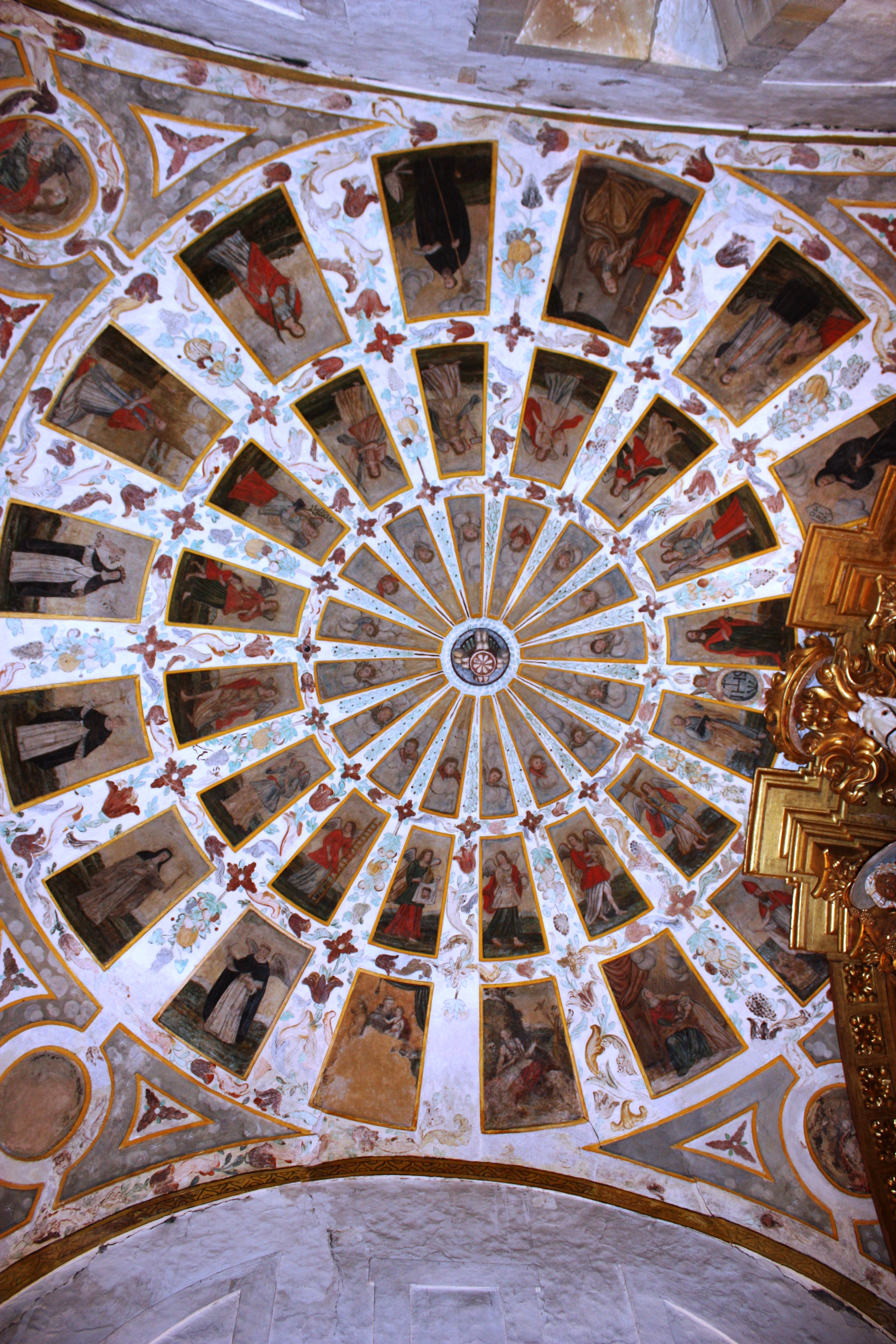
Detail of the ornate flattened vault

The original plan by Güemes, adhered to by successor Fernando de la Huerta, is signed at the bottom by Domingo García Jilledo, Pedro Solano, and Simontío. Mason Pedro Solano died in 1646, and his widow, María de Hontañón Velasco, related to the Cevallos family, authorized Simontío and the new mason Francisco Solano to continue the work in her husband's name. The current temple, in a popular Baroque style from 1762 per an inscription still visible above the entrance portico, features a Latin cross plan with a single nave divided into three sections by pillars and transverse arches, plus two lateral chapels forming the cross’s arms. It is covered by a barrel vault. The temple has an enclosed portico at the foot, an elevated choir also at the foot, and a tower with oculi and openings topped by a semicircular arch.

=== Funding for the sanctuary’s construction ===
Little is known about the total funds required or their sources, but it seems certain that most came from the faithful devoted to the sanctuary and its titular Virgin. Contributions from the town council appear minimal, especially compared to those for the Saint Peter parish church, as historian Canal Sánchez-Pagín noted upon reviewing the council’s “book of agreements,” which meticulously details financial inflows and outflows. In a 1635 session, the Gijón council expressed concern for the chapel—then the old one—and its condition: “... likewise, it is entrusted to lords Diego de Llanos and Baltasar de Jove to inspect the Our Lady of Contrueces chapel, evaluate the defects that require maintenance and repair them.”

In February 1649, when the new chapel’s construction should have been complete, a record notes another donation: “Orders the payment to Captain Don Fernando de Valdés, former and current steward of Our Lady of Contrueces, for the building and works of said church, a charitable donation of 400 reales, as per the agreement in the town council’s minutes book on March 12, 1647. He presented the payment receipt.” (Note: Municipal records for 1647 are missing.)

=== Image and retable ===
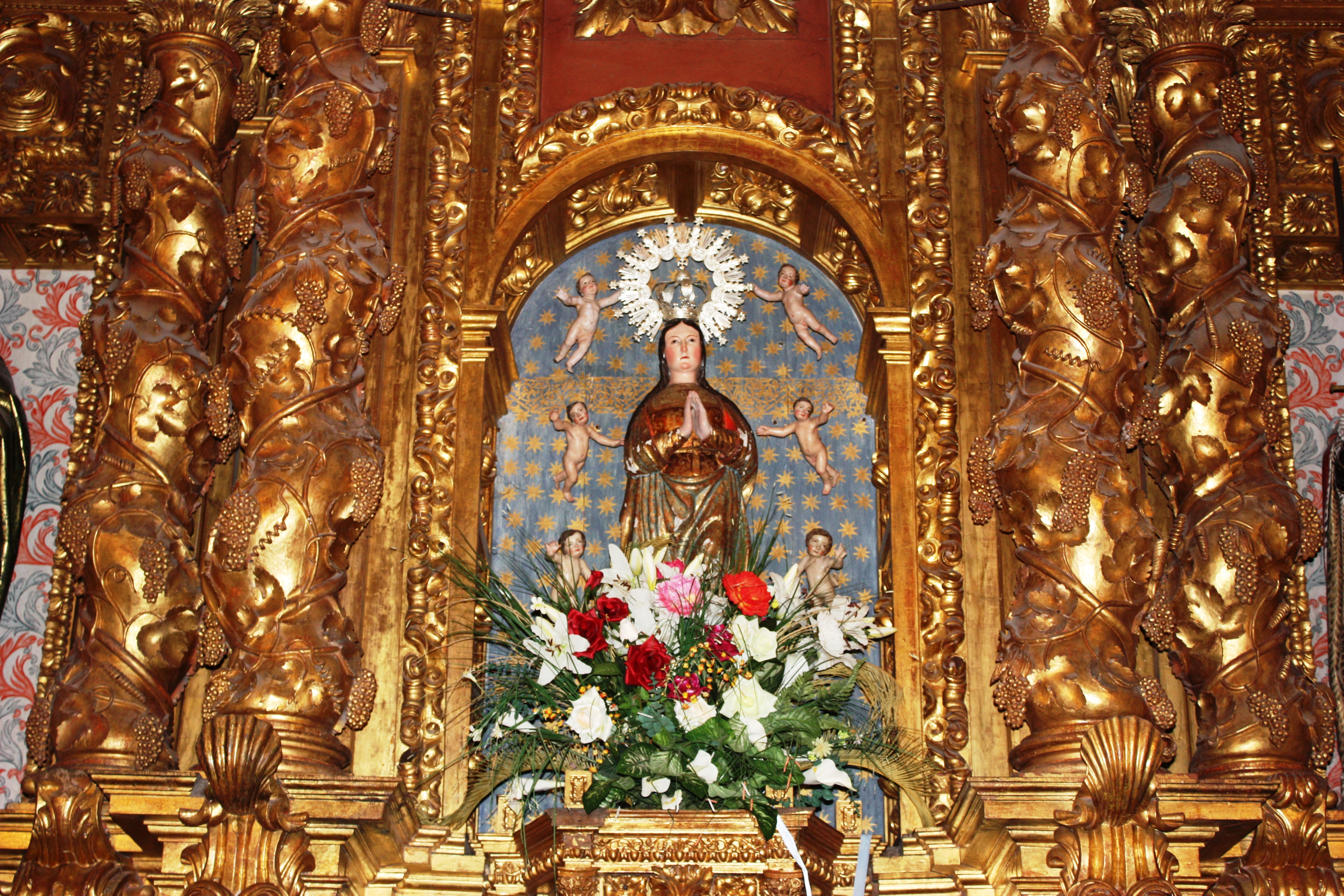
Image of the Virgin

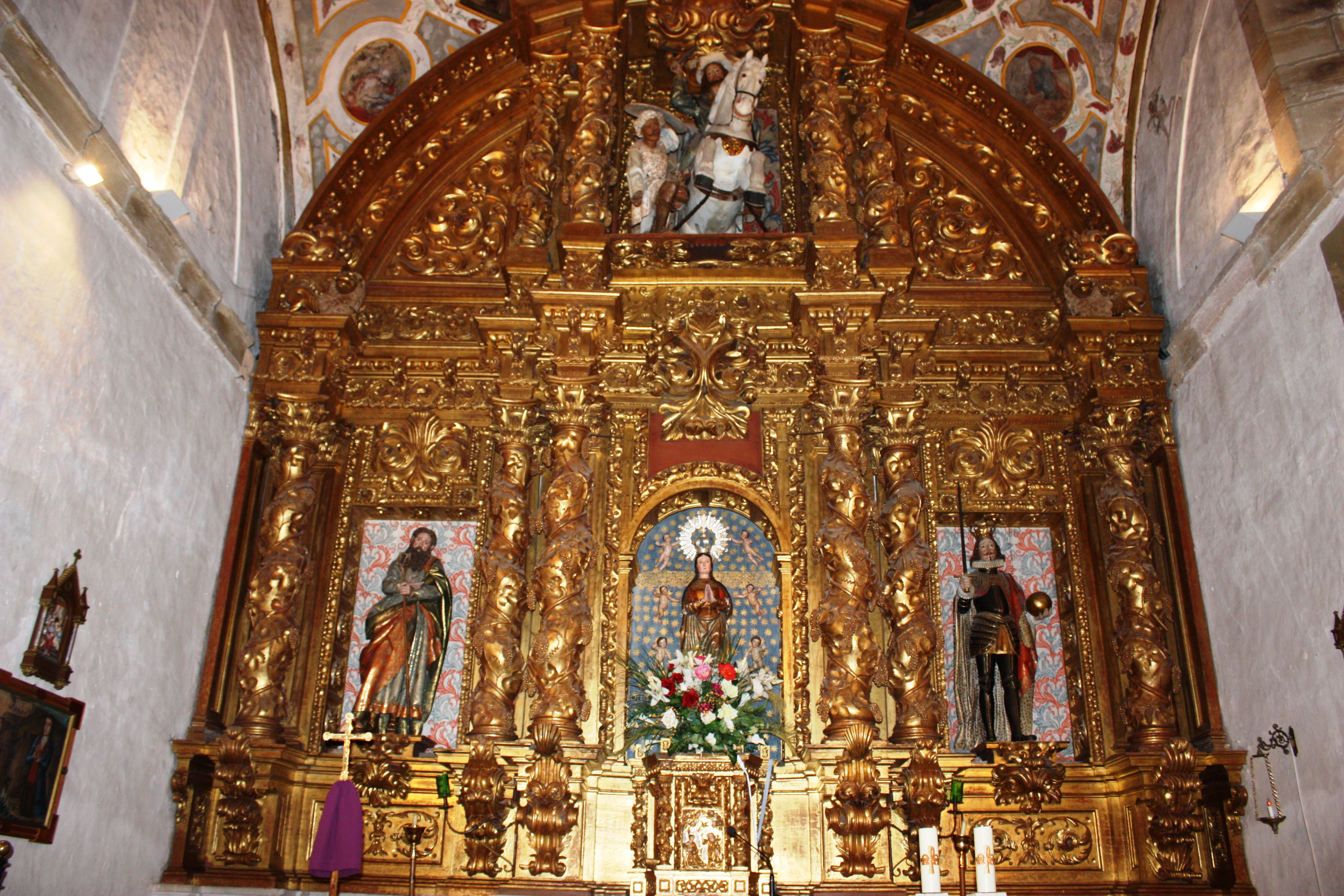
Main retable

The retable, of considerable dimensions in relation to the church as a whole, comprises three sections and two levels, carved in wood and later gilded. American gold was likely used in the gilding, contributed by prosperous returnees from the Americas, as with the high altar of the parish church, “built in 1723 at the expense of charity and funds sent from New Spain by sons of this town’s residents.” It is topped by an arch crowning the main chapel. The tabernacle is trapezoidal, made of silver, with its door adorned with an allegorical sculpture of the Annunciation. Experts suggest the tabernacle may predate the retable’s construction. It is in Baroque style with Churrigueresque influences, retaining its original gilded frescoes.

The image is of carved and painted wood, crowned with silver and surrounded by angels. This image was already venerated in the 16th century in the original church. To the Virgin’s right stands an image of Saint Joachim, her father, and on the other side, one of King Ferdinand III the Saint, canonized in 1671, both works by Gijón sculptor Luis Fernández de la Vega and of great artistic value. The inclusion of Ferdinand III stems from an order by Mariana of Austria, widow of Philip IV and mother of Charles II, mandating that this saintly king’s image be displayed in all major kingdom parishes for public devotion. At the top is a large figure of Saint James the Great on horseback, battling Moors.

=== The Christ and Saint Apollonia ===
The temple features two lateral chapels. The right one, which once served as the sacristy, houses two valuable sculptures: Saint Apollonia in one and a Crucifix from the 12th century, likely present since the sanctuary’s construction. Joaquín Manzanares, a regional art history expert, writes:

This Christ forms an archaeological group with the well-known and venerated ones of Santullano, Teverga, Pravia, Santianes de Pravia, as well as the lesser known ones of Tebongo (exported to the Marès Museum in Barcelona) and Cueras, in the Council of Cangas del Narcea.

— Joaquín Manzanares.

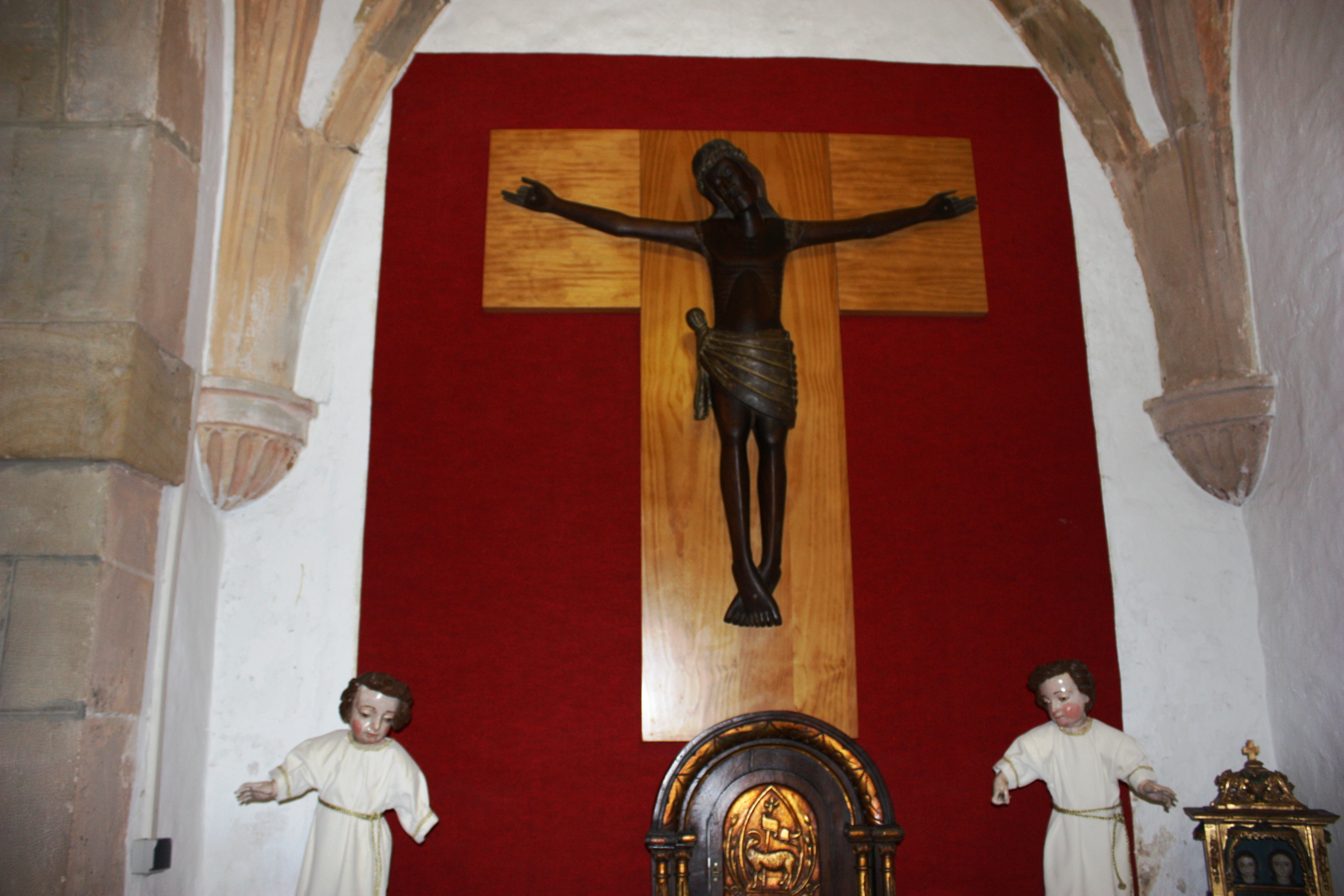
Crucifix of the same antiquity as the Sanctuary

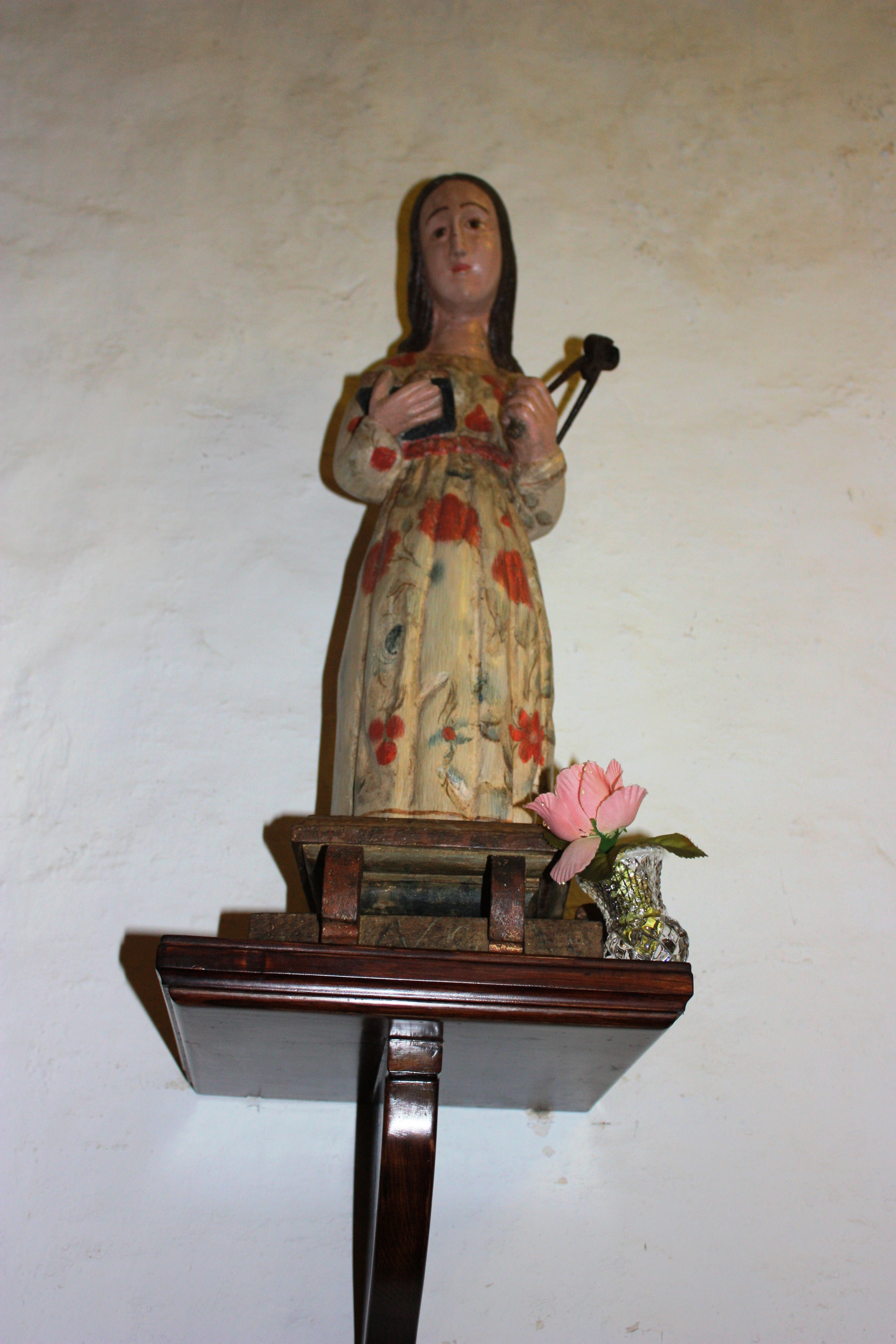
Image of Saint Apollonia, patroness of dentists

Stylistically, Manzanares dates the most artistic, Santullano’s, “... with high probability to the 13th century.” The Contrueces Christ, with its perizoma knotted to the right and minimally draped, is likely later. It is less anatomically detailed than Santullano’s but bears a profound divine expression. Around 1950, well-intentioned but unskilled women washed it with bleach, severely damaging the paint. After 1971, it was repainted with modern plastic paint, to the dismay of experts. This Crucifix bids farewell to the Virgin of Contrueces at the temple door and welcomes the Virgin of the Rosary during their processions for supplications.

The image of Saint Apollonia, dated between the 14th and 15th centuries, depicts her with tongs in her left hand and an open book in her right, as the patroness of dentists, intercessor for those suffering from toothache. The wooden carving, under half a meter tall including its base, caused a stir in the neighborhood and much of Gijón in 1970 when it was stolen from its chapel. For fifteen days, its whereabouts were unknown until the thief, apparently remorseful, returned it.

=== Side chapels ===
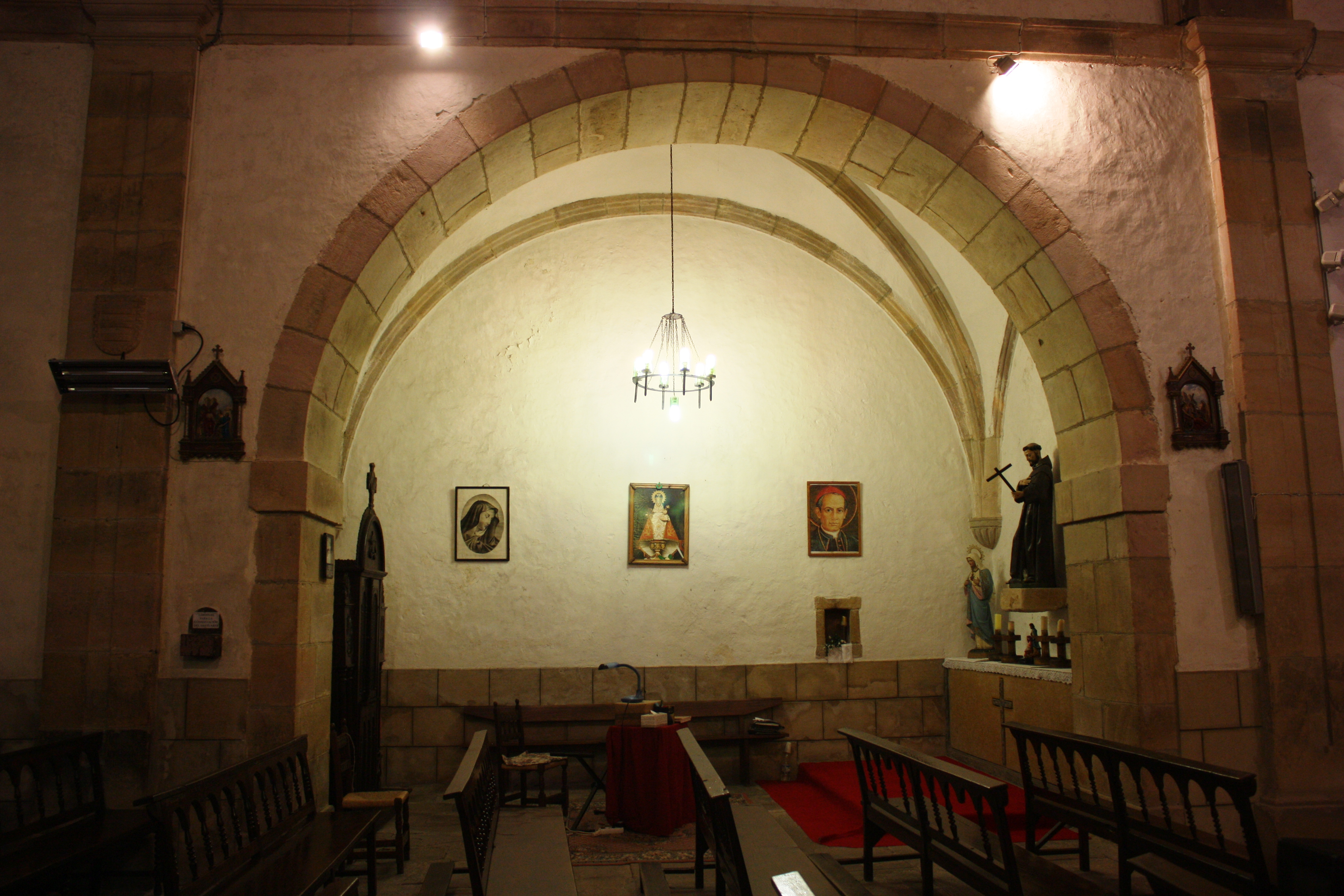
Left side chapel

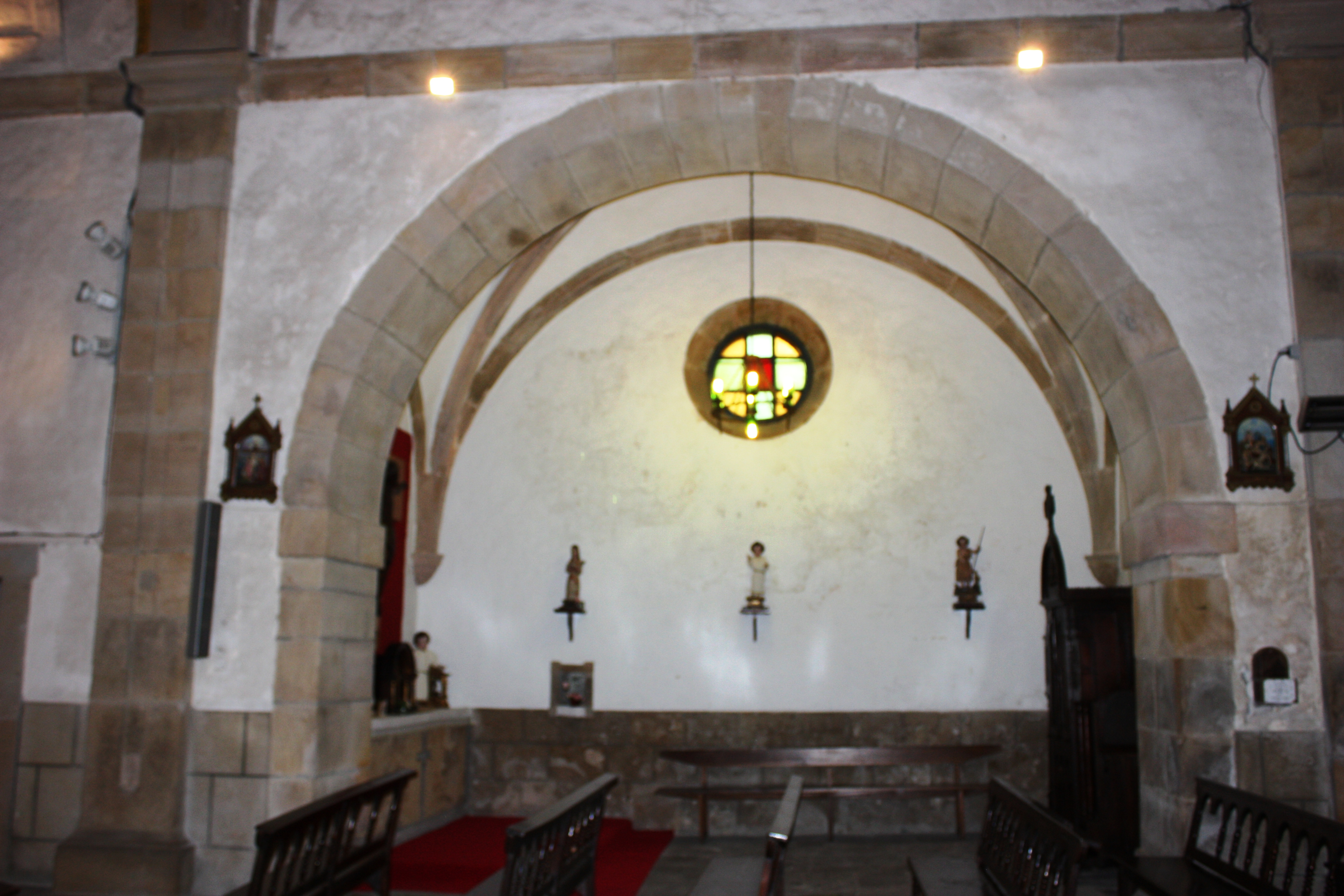
Right side chapel

Until the church’s renovation between 1792 and 1793, two chapels existed, one in each arm of the transept on either side of the main altar. Each had its own retable, though of lesser quality than the main one. The Gospel side chapel featured an image of Saint Michael, while the Epistle side had one of Saint Francis of Assisi. Both images are preserved in the chapel’s museum. The carpenter, José de la Meana, crafted these lateral retables around 1762, also making two confessionals adorned with carvings of small figures and geometric shapes.

=== Pilaster shield ===
On the first pilaster on the chapel’s left side, about three meters high, is a simple shield “with a checkered border, three bands, and a double-row checkered bordure alternating gules and white, still visible today. It measures 36 cm high by 30 cm wide and is slightly convex. Its family origin remains unidentified, though it closely resembles that of the Santander-origin Cevallos family.” Experts disagree, as Gregorio Menéndez Valdés claimed it for his family in his “Avisos”:

At the expense of the devout piety of Hernando Menéndez Valdés, the temple of Santa María de Contrueces was rebuilt up to the pilaster, where a square stone, placed during the construction, bears the family coat of arms. However, this stone did not escape human malice... (who) tried to remove it with repeated blows.

— Gregorio Menéndez Valdés.

Heraldic historians such as Joaquín Manzanares, Canal Sánchez-Pagín, and Sarandeses favor attribution to the Cantabrian Cevallos family, who also contributed to the temple’s construction.

=== House of Novenas ===
Today, nearly four centuries after the church and its house of novenas were completed, their purpose is largely forgotten, as such houses are rare among sanctuaries, with few remnants surviving. These little houses served a primarily religious function, offering shelter and rest to pilgrims heading to this sanctuary or stopping en route to another, providing not just lodging but a suitable setting for meditation and prayer. They should not be confused with the hostels of that era, located in remote areas like crossroads or mountain passes, intended to provide lodging and food to passing travelers.

Often situated near sanctuaries, chapels, and churches, this proximity may explain confusion over their roles. No mention of Contrueces’ house of novenas appears until 1670. Its first reference is in Gijón’s 1670 municipal records, stating:

Likewise, in the name of Don Diego de Hevia, a resident of this town, a petition was presented to ask their honor to repair the road from this town to the Virgin of Contrueces, up to the little house of Novenas, as it benefits the public utility and the service and visitation of the Sanctuary. And to repair the fountain on the royal road below the said Sanctuary.

— Municipal Records of the Gijón Town Council (1670). Folio 57

Other Gijón Town Council documents mention the little house of novenas and related matters, such as Antonio de Barbáchano’s request to the council for permission to use a ground-floor space in the house of novenas to sell wine.

=== Palace ===
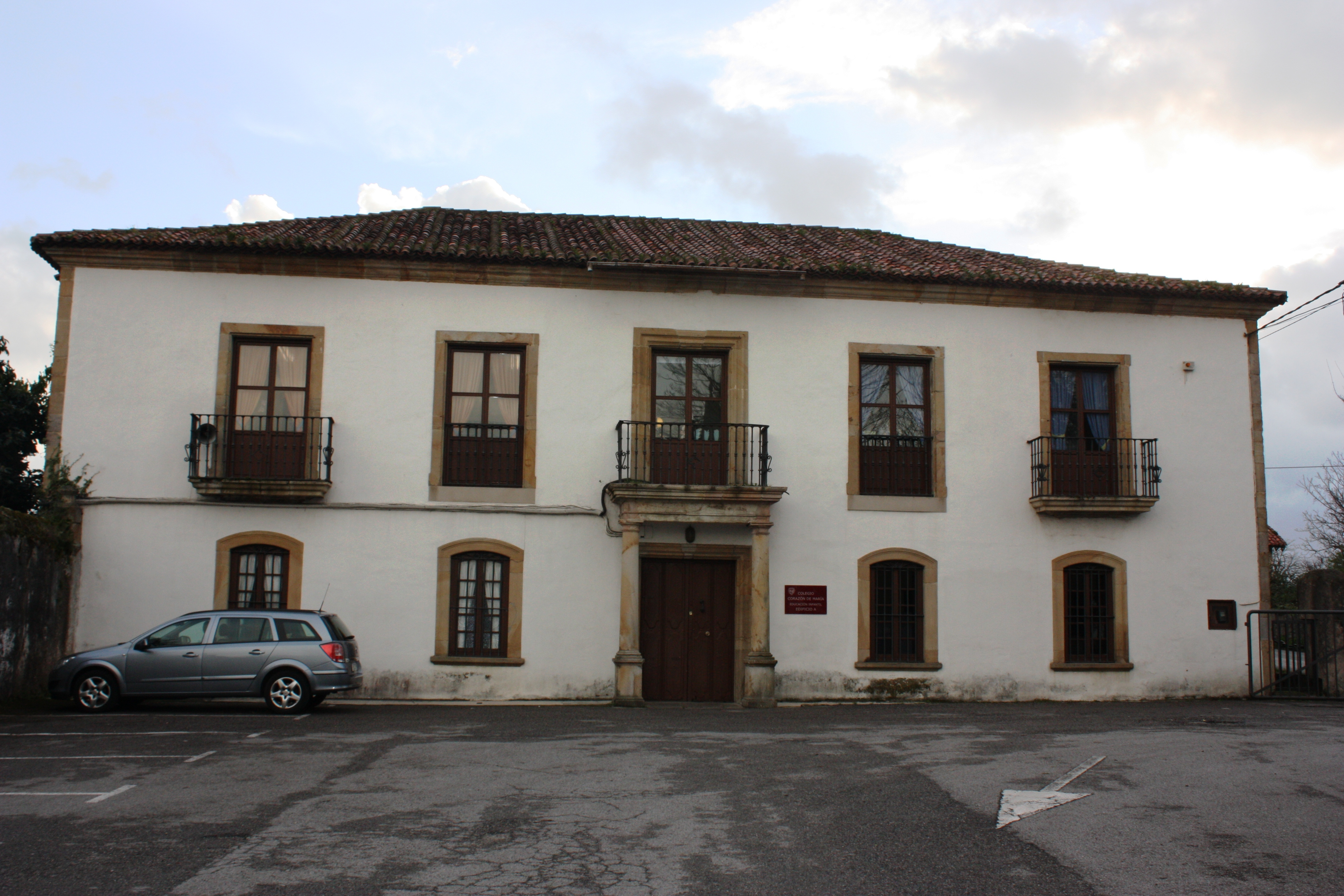
Palace opposite the sanctuary

Across from the church lies a palace whose foundation Bishop Pelayo I attributes to King Alfonso III the Great, built as a defensive stronghold due to its commanding position over Gijón. In the 16th century, it served as a “house of novenas.” By the 18th century, it functioned as a summer palace for the Bishop of Oviedo and a seminary. Today, it houses classrooms for the early childhood education stage of the Colegio del Corazón de María in Gijón (CODEMA), run by the Congregation of the Missionary Sons of the Immaculate Heart of Mary, commonly known as Claretians, ensuring its excellent preservation.

=== Latest renovation ===
For several years, the Claretian Fathers made improvements to the chapel to maintain it and prevent deterioration. Officially, it underwent partial restoration in 2001 by the Culture Department of the Principality of Asturias. The altar’s dome, noted for its pictorial beauty, and the 17th-century wooden retable beneath it—damaged over time—were restored. The images of the Virgin of Contrueces, Saint Joachim, Saint Ferdinand, and Saint James Matamoros atop the retable were also refurbished.

== Stewards of the sanctuary ==
The sanctuary’s steward managed its movable and immovable assets on behalf of the bishopric and town council. Initially, a councilor was always appointed until the former house of novenas became a seminary, after which the bishopric took direct responsibility for appointments. Known stewards, their status, and tenure are listed below:

- Alonso Ramírez Jove, councilor. 1638, 1640
- Fernando de Valdés, councilor. 1645, 1646, 1649
- Gregorio de Jove Bernardo, councilor. 1659
- Felipe Rato Argüelles, councilor. 1659
- Tomás Morán Lavandera, councilor. 1678
- Antonio de la Espriella Jove, councilor. 1684
- Miguel Menéndez Valdés, councilor. 1724

- Cipriano Menéndez Valdés, councilor. 1724–1742
- Alonso Castañeda, priest. 1742
- Juan Menéndez Valdés, Roces curate. 1751–1754
- Francisco Jove Huergo, Gijón priest. 1754–1775
- Manuel González Granda, Saint Peter’s parish priest. 178 ?=5–1786
- José González Granda, priest. 1786–1806
- José Mata de Boves, priest. 1806–1829

Appointments were not without disputes and lawsuits. One, in 1668, pitted the Ceares parish against the council, and another, at a later date, involved the bishopric. The first concerned the stewards’ origins, with Ceares residents arguing they should be local for their familiarity with the sanctuary and its issues. On October 11, 1668, the municipal records address this:

It was agreed that, with regard to the appointment of a steward for the Sanctuary of Contrueces, in the face of the demand of the inhabitants of Ceares that it should be one of their own, and since it was considered inconvenient since they lack the ability to serve well and attend to the needs of the Church, being mostly field workers, and since it has always been held by persons acceptable to all, it was requested that it be continued with a person from this Council (noting, secondly, that most of them have already served).

— Municipal Records of the Gijón Town Council.

Future steward Antonio de la Espriella Jove added a caveat to this dispute, stipulating that resulting costs fall to the appointed steward, not the “republic’s expense,” with stewardship responsibility landing on him. The second lawsuit involved the bishopric, as establishing a seminary in Contrueces’ “house of novenas” caused friction between the bishopric and the town. The behavior of the rector Father Alonso Castañeda greatly troubled Bishop Juan García Avello in his final years, and the town felt its rights diminished when the seminary rector assumed stewardship.

The issue was as follows: stewardship had been in the Menéndez Valdés family’s hands from 1724 to 1742. Conflict arose when Bishop Manrique de Lara appointed Gijón priest Francisco Jove Huergo as steward in 1755, who, with public and episcopal documents, effectively controlled the sanctuary, chapel, and house of novenas. The council saw its rights infringed by the bishopric. To reclaim them, the town’s “general procurator,” Toribio Zarracina, drafted a request to Mayor Tomás Menéndez Jove to assert the town’s usurped rights. A municipal meeting on February 6, 1755, lasting all day, appointed a commission to investigate. As subsequent sessions dropped the matter, it is assumed the council acquiesced to episcopal decisions. Supporting this, the chapel’s Book of Works, spanning 1732 to 1832, notes that bishops took over the house of novenas, expanded it, turned it into a summer residence, and continued appointing stewards without council input. This Book of Works is held in the National Historical Archive.

== Contrueces and Jovellanos ==
Among Gijón’s many illustrious sons who visited the Contrueces sanctuary for devotion, tourism, or other reasons, Jovellanos stands out, favoring it for walks and contemplation. During his exile at Bellver Castle in Mallorca, his dreams and memories drifted to Contrueces, noting: “... the Marian sanctuary of Bonanova was, so to speak, like the Begoña or Contrueces of Mallorcan seafarers.”

Another testament to Jovellanos’ affection for the sanctuary is his “eighth letter” to Antonio Ponz, recalling his joyful youth in Contrueces. Similarly, in his Diaries, he describes in great detail the picnic he had with his friends Llanos, Reconco, Sánchez, Carreño, Terreño and Blanco in Contrueces on Sunday, June 2, 1793.

== Festivals, devotions, miracles, and traditions ==
An ancient custom, rooted in a plea for the Virgin’s intercession, boasts a long tradition: in the 17th century, the Virgin of Contrueces’ image was carried in procession to the Church of Saint Peter, Gijón’s patron saint, to invoke rain in the midst of a prolonged drought.

This first procession to ask for rain became a tradition, with the Virgin of the Rosary being carried from the Church of Saint Peter to the Contrueces sanctuary, while the Virgin of Contrueces traveled to Saint Peter’s, staying nine days. Records of this practice persist at least into the 18th century. During these processions, the sanctuary’s Crucified Christ carving was brought to the temple door to bid farewell to the Virgin of Contrueces and greet the Virgin of the Rosary.

The main festival, as in many Spanish cities, is celebrated on August 15, popularly called “August Virgin’s Day.” Following the religious ceremony, the “offering of the bouquet” and other typical Asturian events draw large crowds. Various documents record pilgrimages honoring not just the Virgin but also Saint Michael and Saint Ferdinand. Beyond veneration, locals attended to buy and sell animals, with these transactions gaining significant prominence.

However, as the Virgin of Begoña’s festival grew in prominence due to its central location in Gijón, Contrueces’ celebration shifted to the Sunday following Begoña’s feast. To balance these events without diminishing either, the Gijón council, on July 4, 1844, recorded an agreement stating:

Considering the decision that every year on the 15th of August a mass would be celebrated in the church of Contrueces by the chief sacristan as an act of possession of the Council, but also considering that on that day a solemn mass must be celebrated in this parish church, it was decided that the mass of Contrueces would be celebrated on the Sunday following the said 15th of August.

— Municipal Record of the Gijón Town Council, (4 July 1844).

The controversy continues, however, as the people of Contrueces maintain their centuries-old claim that the Virgin of Contrueces is the true patron saint of Gijón, and reject the co-patronage. This was in response to a new petition from the Carmelites, who claimed that the Virgin of Begoña was the only patron saint of the city. Nevertheless, Gijón's devotion to the Virgin Mary is reflected in each of its devotions.

== See also ==
- Gijón

== Bibliography ==
- Álvarez, Barroso, Cid y otros, Soledad Julia, Carlos y otros (1984). Colección de arquitectura monumental asturiana [Collection of Monumental Asturian Architecture] (in Spanish). Colegio Oficial de Aparejadores y Arquitectos Técnicos de Asturias. p. 990. ISBN 84-505-0309-4. OCLC 14212510.
- Anónimo (1235). Libro Becerro de Valdedios [Book of Valdediós] (in Spanish).
- Anónimo (1794). Libro maestro de todos los pergaminos y papeles que se hayan en el archivo de esta santa Iglesia de Oviedo con un extracto de su contenido [Master Book of All Parchments and Papers Found in the Archive of This Holy Church of Oviedo with a Summary of Their Contents] (in Spanish).
- Anónimo (1769). Actas municipales del Ayuntamiento de Gijón [Municipal Records of the Gijón Town Council] (in Spanish).
- Anónimo (1994). Liber testamentorum ecclesiae ovetensis: Libro de los Testamentos. Libro Notarial de Don Pelayo, Obispo de Oviedo [Book of Testaments of the Oviedo Church: Book of Testaments. Notarial Book of Don Pelayo, Bishop of Oviedo] (in Latin). Barcelona: M. Moleiro. ISBN 978-84-88526-06-9.
- Ayuntamiento de Gijón. Actas municipales del Ayuntamiento de Gijón [Municipal Records of the Gijón Town Council] (in Spanish). Gijón.
- Barrau-Dihigo, Lucien (1968). Historia política del reino asturiano [Political History of the Asturian Kingdom] (in Spanish). Gijón: Diputación Provincial. p. 298. ISBN 9788472862739. OCLC 21426219.
- Berenguer Alonso, Magín (1979). Rutas de Asturias. Guía Turística y monumental [Routes of Asturias: Tourist and Monumental Guide] (in Spanish). Silverio Cañada. ISBN 84-7286-322-0. OCLC 8889818.
- Canal Sánchez-Pagín, José María (1977). "Nuestra Señora de Contrueces. Dos páginas de la historia de Gijón" [Our Lady of Contrueces: Two Pages of Gijón’s History]. Boletín del Instituto de Estudios Asturianos (in Spanish). 31 (90-91 y 92): 237–284 y 743–794.
- Feijoó, Benito Gerónimo (1749). Justa repulsa de inicuas acusaciones [Just Rebuttal of Wicked Accusations] (in Spanish). OCLC 433369627.
- Fernández Álvarez, Florentino (1997). Asturias, trono de la Madre de Dios [Asturias, Throne of the Mother of God] (in Spanish). F. Fernández. ISBN 84-922832-0-3.
- Fernández Álvarez, Florentino (1990). María en los pueblos de España [Mary in the Towns of Spain] (in Spanish). Madrid: Encuentro. ISBN 8474902525.
- Floriano Cumbreño, Antonio (1949). Restauración del culto cristiano en Asturias en la iniciación de la reconquista [Restoration of Christian Worship in Asturias at the Start of the Reconquest] (in Spanish). Oviedo: Instituto de Estudios Asturianos. OCLC 63639012.
- Floriano Cumbreño, Antonio (1951). Diplomática española del periodo astur [Spanish Diplomatics of the Asturian Period] (in Spanish). Oviedo: Instituto de Estudios Asturianos. OCLC 632015318.
- Floriano Cumbreño, Antonio (1950). El libro registro de Corias [The Corias Register Book] (in Spanish). Oviedo: Instituto de Estudios Asturianos.
- García Álvarez, M.R. (1963). Sobre la cronología y autenticidad de la documentación asturleonesa de la Catedral de Oviedo [On the Chronology and Authenticity of the Astur-Leonese Documentation of the Oviedo Cathedral] (in Spanish). Oviedo: Boletín del Instituto de Estudios Asturianos.
- García de Jove, Nicolás (1636). Protocolos del notario de Gijón Nicolás García de Jove [Protocols of the Gijón Notary Nicolás García de Jove] (in Spanish).
- García Lagarreta, Santos Agustín (1962). Colección de documentos de la Catedral de Oviedo [Collection of Documents from the Oviedo Cathedral] (in Spanish). C.S.I.C.
- García Sampedro, Cristina; Martín Calvo, Rafael (2011). Jovellanos y el Santuario de Nuestra Señora de Contrueces [Jovellanos and the Sanctuary of Our Lady of Contrueces] (in Spanish). Gijón.
- Jovellanos, Baltasar Gaspar Melchor (1947). Colección de Asturias. Publícala el marqués de Aledo [Asturias Collection. Published by the Marquis of Aledo] (in Spanish). Madrid: Gráficas Reunidas. OCLC 35573208.
- Jovellanos, Gaspar Melchor (1967). Descripción histórico-artística del Castillo de Bellver [Historical-Artistic Description of Bellver Castle] (in Spanish). Palma de Mallorca: Mallorquina de F. Pons. p. 191. OCLC 4503078.
- Jovellanos, Baltasar Gaspar Melchor (1953). Diarios [Diaries] (in Spanish). Oviedo: Diputación de Asturias, Instituto de Estudios Asturianos del Patronato José M. Quadrado (C.S.I.C.). OCLC 486406.
- Manzanares Rodríguez, Joaquín (1957). El Cristo de Santullano [The Christ of Santullano] (in Spanish). Oviedo: s.n. OCLC 12255167.
- Menéndez Valdés, Gregorio (1774). Avisos históricos y políticos [Historical and Political Notices] (in Spanish).
- Pérez de Urbel, Justo (1952). Sampiro, su crónica y la monarquía leonesa en el siglo X [Sampiro, His Chronicle, and the Leonese Monarchy in the 10th Century] (in Spanish). Madrid: C.S.I.C. p. 488. OCLC 4256224.
- Rendueles Llanos, Enrique (1867). Historia de la villa de Gijón... [History of the Town of Gijón...] (in Spanish). Gijón: Imp. de El Norte de Asturias. OCLC 794349411.
- Rivera Quirós, Toribio. Protocolo de notaría [Notarial Protocol] (in Spanish).
- Sampedro Redondo, Laura (2005). Libro 2.º: libro de Actas del Ayuntamiento de Gijón (1560-1577) [Book 2: Book of Records of the Gijón Town Council (1560-1577)] (in Spanish). Oviedo: Ayuntamiento de Gijón. ISBN 84-96476-35-9. OCLC 470297481.
- Sarandeses Pérez, Francisco (1966). Heráldica de los apellidos asturianos [Heraldry of Asturian Surnames] (in Spanish). C.S.I.C. ISBN 84-00-00159-1. OCLC 6394854.
- Sojo y Lomba, F (1935). Los maestros canteros de Trasmiera [The Master Stonemasons of Trasmiera] (in Spanish). Madrid: Huelves y Compa. p. 234. OCLC 432820611.
- Somoza de Montsoriú, Julio (1971). Gijón en la historia general de Asturias [Gijón in the General History of Asturias] (in Spanish). Gijón: Ayuntamiento de Gijón. OCLC 13174562.
- Vélez Albo, Augustino (1902). De mi tierra [Of My Land] (in Spanish). OCLC 434279900.
- Vigil, Ciriaco Miguel (1887). Asturias monumental, epigráfica y diplomática, datos para la historia de la provincia [Monumental, Epigraphic, and Diplomatic Asturias, Data for the Province’s History] (in Spanish). Oviedo: Imprenta del Hospicio Provincial. p. 638. OCLC 7542940.
- VV. AA. (1970). Gran Enciclopedia Asturiana [Great Asturian Encyclopedia] (in Spanish). Gea Distribuciones Gráficas 2000 S.L. ISBN 84-7286-100-7. OCLC 802731876.
