= Caldones =

Coordinates: 43°29′4″N 5°37′36″W

- Parish
- Interactive map of Caldones
- Country: Spain
- Autonomous community: Asturias
- Province: Asturias
- Municipality: Gijón

Population (2016)
  - Total: 419

Caldones is a parish of the municipality of Gijón, in Asturias, Spain.

Its population was 430 in 2012.

Located in the east of the municipality, Caldones is a rural area which borders the municipality of Villaviciosa in the east, with the districts of Vega and Llavandera in the west, and with the district of Valdornón in the south.

== Villages and their neighbourhoods ==
Caldones
El Barriu la Ilesia

- La Cruz
- El Peñón

Garbelles

- La Bustia
- Garbelles de Baxo
- Garbelles de Riba
  - El Serraderu
- Llaneces
- La Llomba

Llinares
Riosecu

- La Cabaña'l Marqués
- El Curullu

Robleo

- El Balagón
- El Cantu Mareo
- La Llomba

San Pelayo

- Bovies

Los Villares
