= Marcelino Menéndez Pintado =

Marcelino Juan Menéndez Pintado (Castropol, Asturias, September 26, 1823 - Santander, Cantabria, May 13, 1899) was a Spanish professor, mathematician and politician.

== Biography ==
He was born on September 26, 1823, in the Asturian municipality of Castropol; son of Francisco Antonio Menéndez (Lavandera, 1787-Santander, 1865), retired as a postmaster of Torrelavega, and Josefa Pintado. He married María Jesús Pelayo y España in the church of La Compañía in 1851, when he was 28 years old and she was one year younger; with her he had four children: the famous scholar Marcelino, the doctor and writer Enrique, Jesusa, and Agustín.

He studied at the University of Oviedo and the Central University of Madrid. In March 1846, he was an interim professor of mathematics in Soria. In 1851, at the age of 28, he was a substitute professor of Commerce at the Santander Institute. The following year he became a permanent professor of Mathematics, while also serving as vice-director of the center.

During the Carlist Wars, he was a national militiaman in Torrelavega from the age he was able to take up arms until the disarmament of 1843. Later, he served in Santander between 1854 and 1856. He was also a member of the Progressive Party and by Royal Order was appointed mayor of the Santander City Council for the Progressive Biennium. However, coinciding with a cholera epidemic, he resigned from his position after receiving criticism for his actions in prohibiting the use of some public fountains.

Menéndez Pintado died on May 13, 1899, due to a lung complication.

== Published Works ==
- Principles of Arithmetic and Algebra and Principles of Geometry and Trigonometry
