= Castiello Bernueces =

- Parish
- Location within Asturias Location within Spain
- Coordinates: 43.51082°N 5.64291°W
- Country: Spain
- Autonomous community: Asturias
- Province: Asturias
- Municipality: Gijón

Population (2016)
  - Total: 1,152

Castiello Bernueces is a parish of the municipality of Gijón / Xixón, in Asturias, Spain.

Its population was 740 in 2003 and 1,070 in 2012.

A traditionally rural area, nowadays mainly residential, Castiello Bernueces is located on south of the city and borders Vega, Santurio and Granda in the south, and Somió and Cabueñes in the northeastern side.

In this parish is located the local Campus of the University of Oviedo.

== Villages and their neighbourhoods ==
Castiello Bernueces

- El Barriu Baxo
  - El Cerrucu
  - El Curullu
  - La Gayola
  - El Pradón
- El Barriu Riba
- Cadrecha
- La Madalena
  - Los Maizales
- Les Mestes
- Viñao
- Xigueo
  - El Campón

== Notable people ==
- Demetrio González
