= La Camocha =

Coordinates: 43.487°N 5.652°W

- Neighbourhood
- Interactive map of La Camocha
- Country: Spain
- Autonomous community: Asturias
- Province: Asturias
- Municipality: Gijón
- Parish: Vega

La Camocha is a mining neighbourhood located in the rural district parish of Vega (Gijón / Xixón) in the Principality of Asturias, Spain. It is 90 m above sea level and 8 km from the center of Gijón. The neighbourhood emerged to host the workers of the adjacent La Camocha coal mine.

== Population ==
In 2020, the population was 1278 inhabitants (INE 2020), distributed in 750 households.

== See also ==
- Vega
- La Camocha, Asturias coal mine
