= Luis Fernández de la Vega =

Spanish sculptor and carver

Luis Fernández de la Vega (1601 – 1675 in Gijón) was a Spanish sculptor and carver. He was born in Asturias, but began working in Valladolid. Once he returned to Asturias he never left.

== Works ==
- Gijón is the altarpiece of Contrueces sanctuary, in Gijón
- altarpieces of the chapels of Santa Barbara and Vigiles,
- the altar of St. Martin
- the statue the Vigil de Quiñones and
- images of San Roque,
- the Conception and St. Teresa of Jesus
