= Deva, Gijón =

Coordinates: 43°30′24″N 5°35′15″W

Deva
- Parish
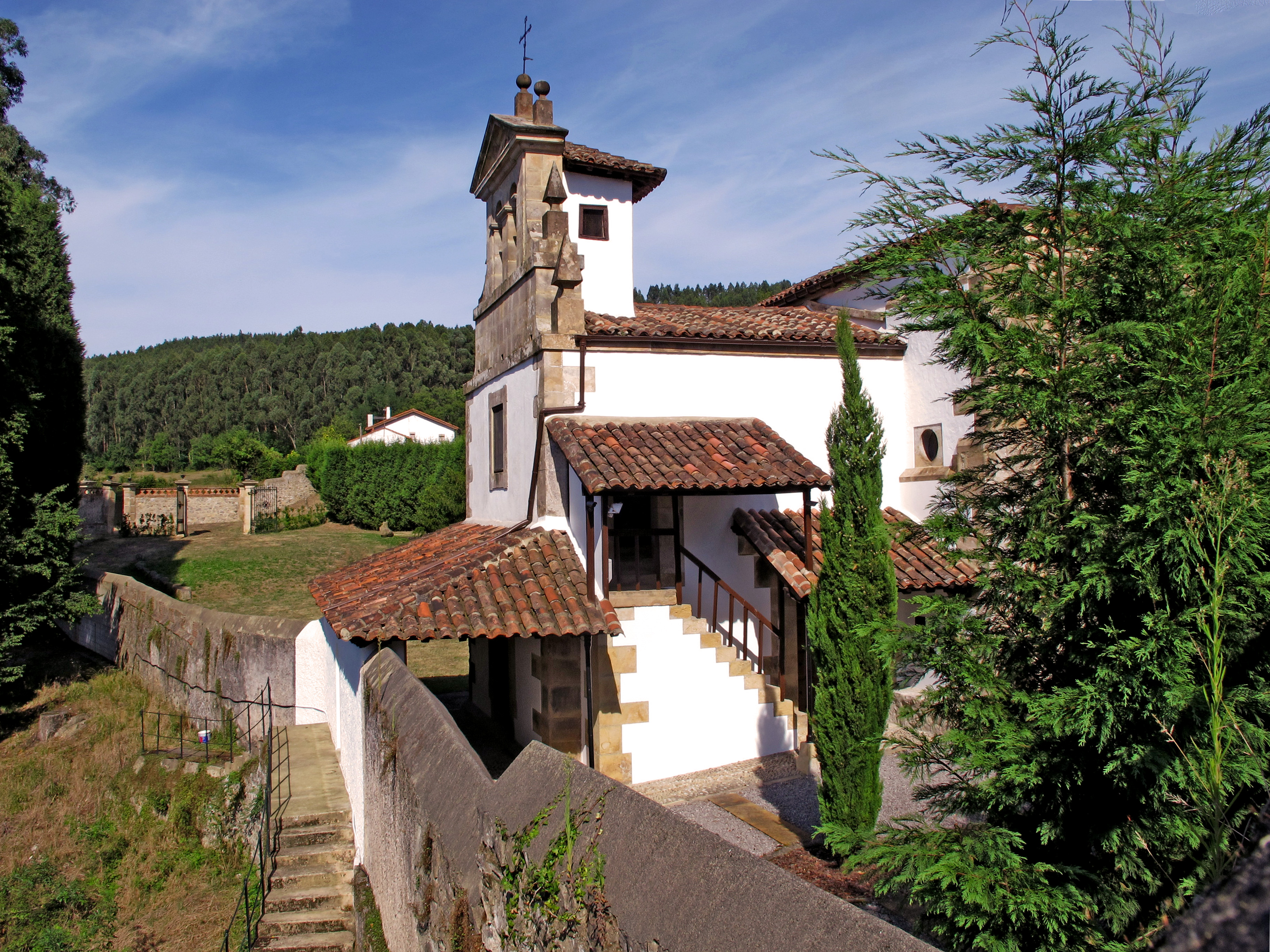
- Interactive map of Deva
- Country: Spain
- Autonomous community: Asturias
- Province: Asturias
- Municipality: Gijón

Population (2016)
  - Total: 712

Deva is a parish of the municipality of Gijón, in Asturias, Spain. The toponym itself comes from an ancient pre-Roman/astur deity.

Its population was 705 in 2012.

== Points of interest ==
Deva is a residential and rural area which borders the municipality of Villaviciosa in the east, and with the districts of Cabueñes in the north and Caldones in the south. The area is mainly made up of fields (occupied mainly by cows), belonging to adjacent farmhouses. There are also many chalets and houses, and a horseriding center. A small river passes through the area and it is common for cityfolk to come to Deva at the weekends to enjoy the fresh air and the many bars and "merenderos".

The highest peak is Monte Deva (423 m). There is a small natural park surrounding the peak, where roe deer, wild boar and many species of bird can be found. There is also an astronomical observatory, and great views of the city of Gijon.

== Holidays ==
The parish of Deva celebrates a traditional Fiesta every year in honour of their patron saint, San Salvador. Deva's vibrant community spirit is highlighted during these festivities, where elders and youths mingle, eating lamb and drinking cider.

== Villages and their neighbourhoods ==
Castañera
El Fondón
Llorea
La Olla

- L'Arquera
- Chelufausto
- El Mirador
- La Parea los Teyeros

El Pedroco
La Reguera

- La Posadiella
- La Quinta'l Conde

Riosecu

- Brañaverniz

San Antonio

- L'Armería

Serantes
Zarracina
