= Santurio =

Coordinates: 43°30′3.78″N 5°37′39.58″W

- Parish
- Interactive map of Santurio
- Country: Spain
- Autonomous community: Asturias
- Province: Asturias
- Municipality: Gijón

Population (2016)
  - Total: 258

Santurio is a parish of the municipality of Gijón / Xixón, in Asturias, Spain.

Its population was 265 in 2012.

Santurio is a residential and rural area, bordering with the districts of Deva in the east and Castiello Bernueces in the west.

== Villages and their neighbourhoods ==
L'Aldea

- Los Erones
- Les Peñes
- Rozaes

Carceo

- Les Cañaveres

La Cuesta
