= Samartín de Güerces =

- Parish
- Interactive map of Samartín de Güerces
- Country: Spain
- Autonomous community: Asturias
- Province: Asturias
- Municipality: Gijón

Population (2016)
  - Total: 334

Samartín de Güerces (Spanish: Huerces) is a parish of the municipality of Gijón / Xixón, in Asturias, Spain.

Its population was 313 in 2012.

Samartín de Güerces borders the municipality of Siero in the south and with the districts of Vega and Llavandera in the east. Its highest peak is Picu Samartín (513 m)

== Villages and their neighbourhoods ==
Cagüezo

- La Cruz
- La Ilesia
- El Molín de Cagüezo

El Monte

- La Gotera
- La Marquesa
- El Monte Pangrán
- La Torre

Santecía

- La Fayona
- La Gola
- Llagos
- El Xigal

Villaverde

- Colloto
- El Trechoru
