= Valdornón =

- Parish
- Interactive map of Valdornón
- Country: Spain
- Autonomous community: Asturias
- Province: Asturias
- Municipality: Gijón

Population (2016)
  - Total: 185

Valdornón is a parish of the municipality of Gijón / Xixón, in Asturias, Spain.

Its population was 175 in 2012.

Valdornón is located on the southeastern area of Gijón / Xixón. It borders the municipalities of Villaviciosa, Siero and Sariego in the Peña de los Cuatro Jueces, which with its 622 meters is the tallest point of Gijón.

== Villages and their neighbourhoods ==
La Mata

- La Campa
- Treboria

Quintana

- Gorgoyo
- Migule

Riosecu

- Brañanueva

Salientes

- El Caleru
- El Caxigal
- Los Llagos
- El Tiroco

Santolaya
Tarna

- El Molín
