= Llavandera =

Coordinates: 45.6712°N 9.3662°E

- Parish
- Interactive map of Llavandera
- Country: Spain
- Autonomous community: Asturias
- Province: Asturias
- Municipality: Gijón

Population (2016)
  - Total: 348

Llavandera is a parish of the municipality of Gijón, in Asturias, Spain.

The population of Llavandera was 356 in 2012.

It borders the districts of Fano in the east, Vega in the north, Samartín de Güerces in the west and the municipality of Siero in the south.

== Villages and their neighbourhoods ==
La Bovia

- El Vallín
- El Xironte

Llavandera

- La Rotella

Llinares

- El Costanciu
- La Sierra
- La Torre
- Los Vallinos

El Monte

- Les Cabañes

Tueya

- El Caleyu
- El Cascayu
- El Cotarón
- Los Ñavalinos
- El Peñéu
- El Riundu
