= La Camocha, Asturias coal mine =

Coordinates: 43.4856°N 5.6662°W

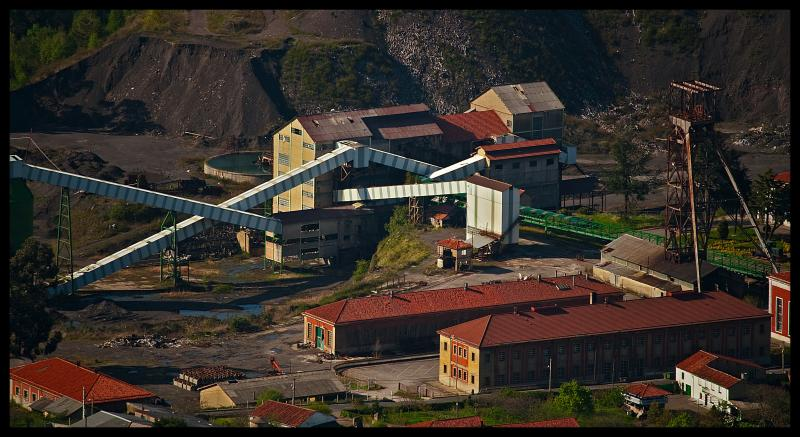
Partial view of the outdoor facilities of La Camocha Mine, from the Picu'l Sol. In the center is the laundry and, behind it, the dump. To the right is the castle of well # 3.

La Camocha is a former coal mine in Spain. It is located 7 kilometres (4 mi) south of Gijón in Asturias. It was operated by Minas la Camocha SA, which is affiliated with González y Díez SA.

The former mining railway that once linked the coal mine of La Camocha to Veriña has been replaced by La Camocha Greenway, a trail for hikers and cyclists.

The trade union movement Comisiones Obreras (CC.OO.) was born in the La Camocha mine.
