= Granda, Gijón =

Coordinates: 43°30′19″N 5°39′24″W

Granda
- Parish
- Interactive map of Granda
- Country: Spain
- Autonomous community: Asturias
- Province: Asturias
- Municipality: Gijón

Population (2016)
  - Total: 650

Granda is a district (parroquia rural) of the municipality of Gijón / Xixón, in Asturias, Spain.

Its population was 661 in 2012.

Granda is a residential and rural area, bordering with the city district in the north and with Vega in the south.

== Villages and their neighbourhoods ==
Granda de Baxo

- La Barniella
- La Folguera

Granda de Riba

- La Belga
- La Carbayera
- El Foru
- La Perdiz

Vaones
