= Timeline of Gijón =

The following is a timeline of the history of the city of Gijón, Spain.

== Prior to 20th century ==
- 5th century BC – Foundation of the castro de Noega hillfort in Campa Torres, origin of the present-day city of Gijón.
- 1st century – Roman occupation. The settlement moves to a new, more suitable location, in what is now the neighborhood of Cimadevilla, and takes the name of Gigia.
- 2nd century – Construction of Campo Valdés Roman baths.
- 844 – Gijón successfully resisted a Norman raid.
- 1270 – Alfonso X granted Gijón the status of puebla (town).
- 1395 – Gijón was burned down.
- 1480 – The Catholic Monarchs give the authorization and the means for the construction of a port in Gijón.
- 1560 – Gijón city archives active (approximate date).
- 1721 – Palacio de Revillagigedo built.
- 1797 – Real Instituto Jovellanos founded.
- 1842 – Population: 16,558.
- 1865 – Casa consistorial de Gijón (city hall) built.
- 1876 – Ceares Cemetery opens.
- 1878 – El Comercio newspaper begins publication.
- 1888 – El Bibio bullring opens.
- 1884 – Establishment of railway communications.
- 1890
  - Tramways begin to operate in the city. They would continue to do so until 1964.
  - Municipal fire department is created.
- 1892 – El Musel port opens.
- 1899 – Jovellanos Theater opens (from 1899 to 1942 it was called Dindurra Theater).
- 1900 – Population: 47,544.

== 20th century ==
- 1905 – Sporting de Gijón is founded.
- 1913 – 22 people die and many more are injured while they were watching a controlled blast at the seaport of El Musel. Due to technical errors, a shower of stones fell on the 300 people who were watching the event.
- 1917 – El Molinón stadium opens (it is the oldest association football stadium in Spain still in use as of 2025).
- 1924
  - Cavalcade of Magi is held in Gijón for the first time.
  - First Feria de Muestras de Asturias, now Feria Internacional de Muestras de Asturias (Asturias International Trade Fair).
- 1930 – Population: 78,239.
- 1934 – Fighting takes place in the city, in the context of the Spanish 1934 revolution.
- 1936 – Siege of Gijón takes place, during Spanish Civil War.
- 1940 – Population: 101,341.
- 1941
  - Isabel la Católica Park (the main park in Gijón) opens.
  - Gijón bus station begins operation. A private station, belonging to ALSA bus company, it remains in operation as of 2025, although in poor condition.
- 1947 – Jove Hospital begins operation in its current location. With different names and in different locations, it has been operating in Gijón from 1804 to the present.
- 1950 – Population: 108,546.
- 1953 – Municipal bus service begins operation.
- 1955 – The construction of the Universidad Laboral is finished.
- 1960
  - Population: 122,357.
  - Las Mil Quinientas (meaning "the one thousand five hundred"), a 1,500-unit housing complex that shaped Pumarín neighbourhood, is inaugurated.
- 1968
  - Museum of the Asturian People opens.
  - Cabueñes Hospital, Gijón's main hospital, begins operation.
- 1970 – Population: 184,698.
- 1971 – UNINSA steel factory opens. It would be later integrated into Spanish state-owned ENSIDESA steel company. As of 2025, the factory belongs to ArcelorMittal group.
- 1972 – Mercaplana is held for the first time: a Christmas event that began as a gardening and fauna market and later became a Christmas Fair for Children and Youth.
- 1976 – Alberto Alonso Blanco, known as "Rambal", a gay man well known in the historic neighbourhood of Cimadevilla, where he lived, is murdered in his home, that was intentionally set on fire afterwards. The crime was never solved. Decades later, he became a symbol for the local LGTB community. A statue in Cimadevilla neighbourhood and a song were dedicated to him.
- 1978
  - Gijón's school of engineering opens, as part of the University of Oviedo. In 1982, it would move to a new university campus in Viesques neighbourhood, where it continues operating as the Gijón Polytechnic School of Engineering.
  - Seven children die after drowning at sea in San Lorenzo beach.
- 1979 – José Manuel Palacio becomes the first mayor of Gijón elected after the restoration of democracy in Spain.
- 1980 – A shooting incident in Ceares neighbourhood leaves 3 dead and 1 injured.
- 1981
  - Population: 255,969.
  - Carnival is celebrated in Gijón for the first time since Spanish Civil War.
- 1982
  - Begin the Beguine (in Spanish, Volver a empezar) film is released. The film would be well remembered for its portrayal of Gijón as it was at the time, before many changes reshaped the city.
  - Part of 1982 FIFA World Cup football contest held in Gijón, including the controversial match between West Germany and Austria.
- 1984 – Student Raúl Losa is killed in a demonstration against shipyard reconversion, when a man used his gun to try to prevent his car from being used as a barricade.
- 1985 – Las Mestas athletics track opens.
- 1986 – Castillo de Salas ship sinks in Gijón while carrying nearly 100,000 tons of coal. People watched the ship for days as it was in the process of sinking. San Lorenzo beach suffered from oil and coal spills afterwards.
- 1987 – Vicente Álvarez Areces becomes mayor.
- 1988 – Gijón's Semana Negra ("black week") literary festival is held for the first time.
- 1989 – 2 Civil Guard agents are murdered by GRAPO terrorist group at Gijón tax office.
- 1990
  - Elogio del Horizonte, monument by Eduardo Chillida and symbol of the city, is inaugurated.
  - Slums are eradicated from El Llano neighbourhood. About 400 people from 60 families needed to be rehoused. A big avenue and a shopping mall were created in the area, along with residential buildings. The operation would be complete by 1993.
- 1991 – Population: 259,067.
- 1992 – Palacio de Deportes opens.
- 1993 – Local television channel TLG (Televisión Local Gijón) opens. It would close down in 2009.
- 1995
  - El Comercio newspaper becomes the first one in Spain to be available on the Internet.
  - Poniente Beach, an artificial beach, is inaugurated.
  - Elías Méndez Menéndez, a wine distributor, dies while trying to prevent a bank robbery. A park in the city was named after him 3 years later.
- 1996 – Gijón's Carnival includes the entierro de la sardina (burial of the sardine) parade for the first time. Since then, a different name and characterization are given to the Gijón Carnival's sardine each year. The 1996 sardine was called Lorenza.
- 1997 – 2 young people die when their car falls into the sea at Gijón marina. 2 other young women survived, one of them very seriously injured.
- 1998 – Gijón Railway Museum opens, occupying the building of former Gijón's Renfe station, in operation until 1990.
- 1999
  - Paz Fernández Felgueroso becomes mayor.
  - Deva Cemetery opens.
  - On December 31, at Cabueñes Hospital, a woman who had been clinically dead for a month and a half gives birth to a baby, in a case described as a "miracle baby". The child developed without problems.
- 2000 – 3 people from the same family die, and another 3 are injured, after being run over by a car (whose driver tested positive for alcohol) on a sidewalk during the fireworks night on August 15, one of the main festivities in Gijón.

== 21st century ==
- 2001 – Population: 266,419.
- 2002 – The roof of Gijón bus station falls down, leaving 11 people injured.
- 2003
  - Jardín Botánico Atlántico (botanical garden) founded.
  - Inauguration of Celestino Solar Citadel Museum, that shows how life was in the working class homes of Gijón in the late 19th and early 20th centuries (citadel, ciudadela in Spanish, was the name given to very modest workers housing complexes).
- 2006
  - Gijón Air Festival is first held.
  - Gijón Aquarium is inaugurated.
  - Regional television channel TPA starts broadcasting, operating from Gijón.
- 2011
  - Carmen Moriyón becomes mayor.
  - Population: 276,969.
- 2014 – Metrópoli music and entertainment media festival is celebrated for the first time.
- 2019 – Ana González becomes mayor.
- 2021 – Population: 269,311.
- 2022 – Gijón Open tennis tournament is held for the first (and, so far, only) time.
- 2023 – Carmen Moriyón becomes mayor again.

== Evolution of the Gijón map ==
=== 17th century ===
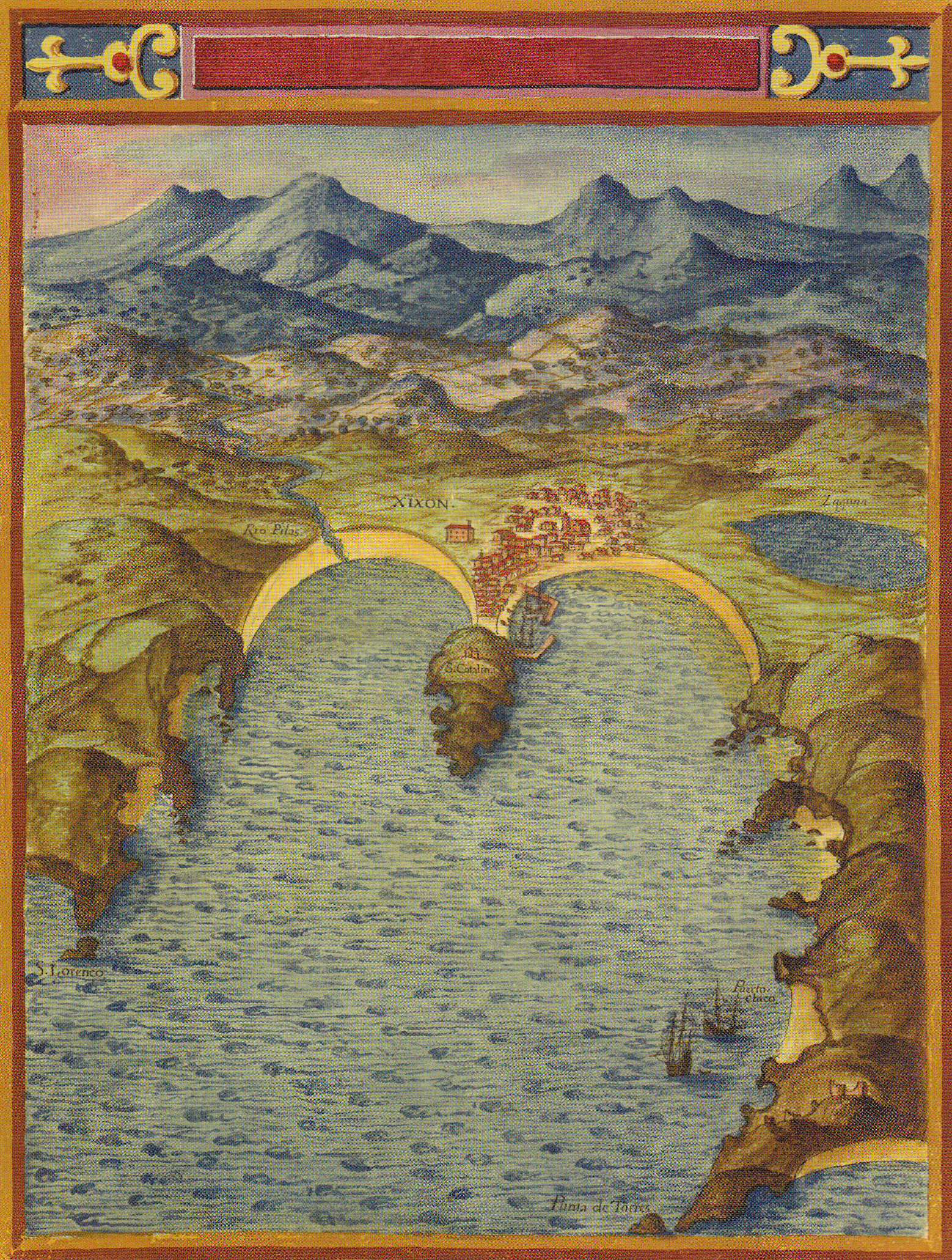
1634

=== 19th century ===
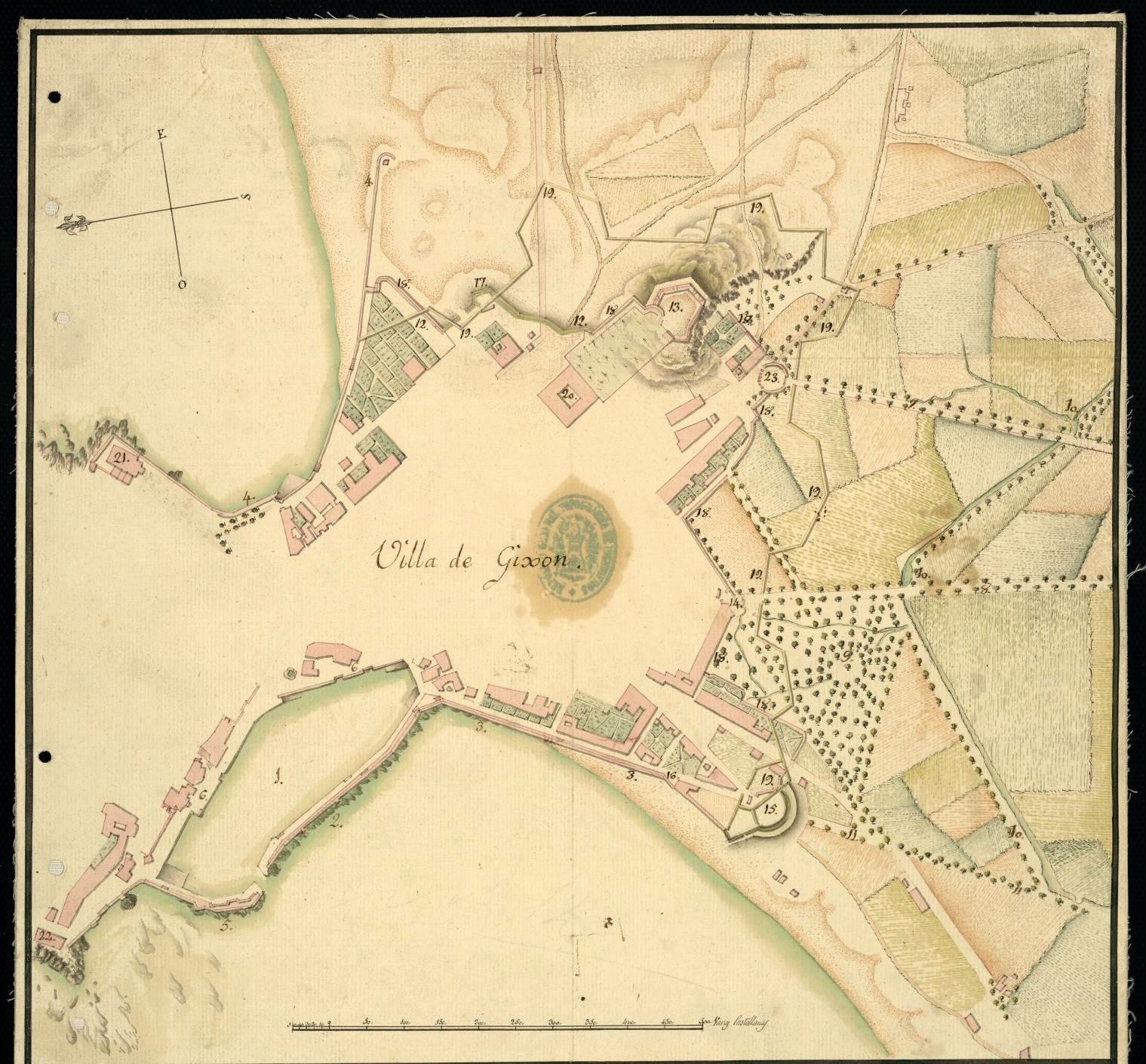
1812

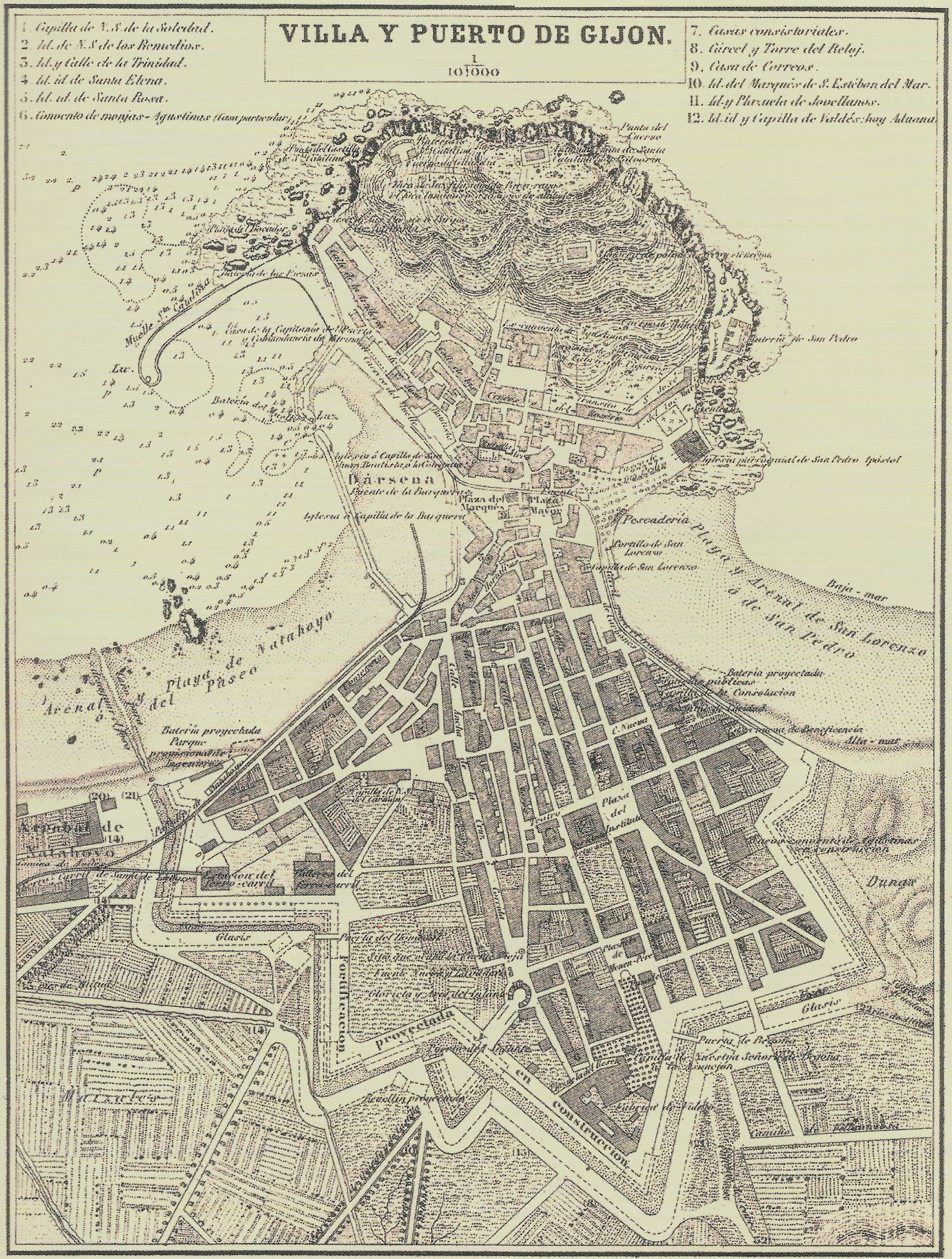
1870

=== 20th century ===
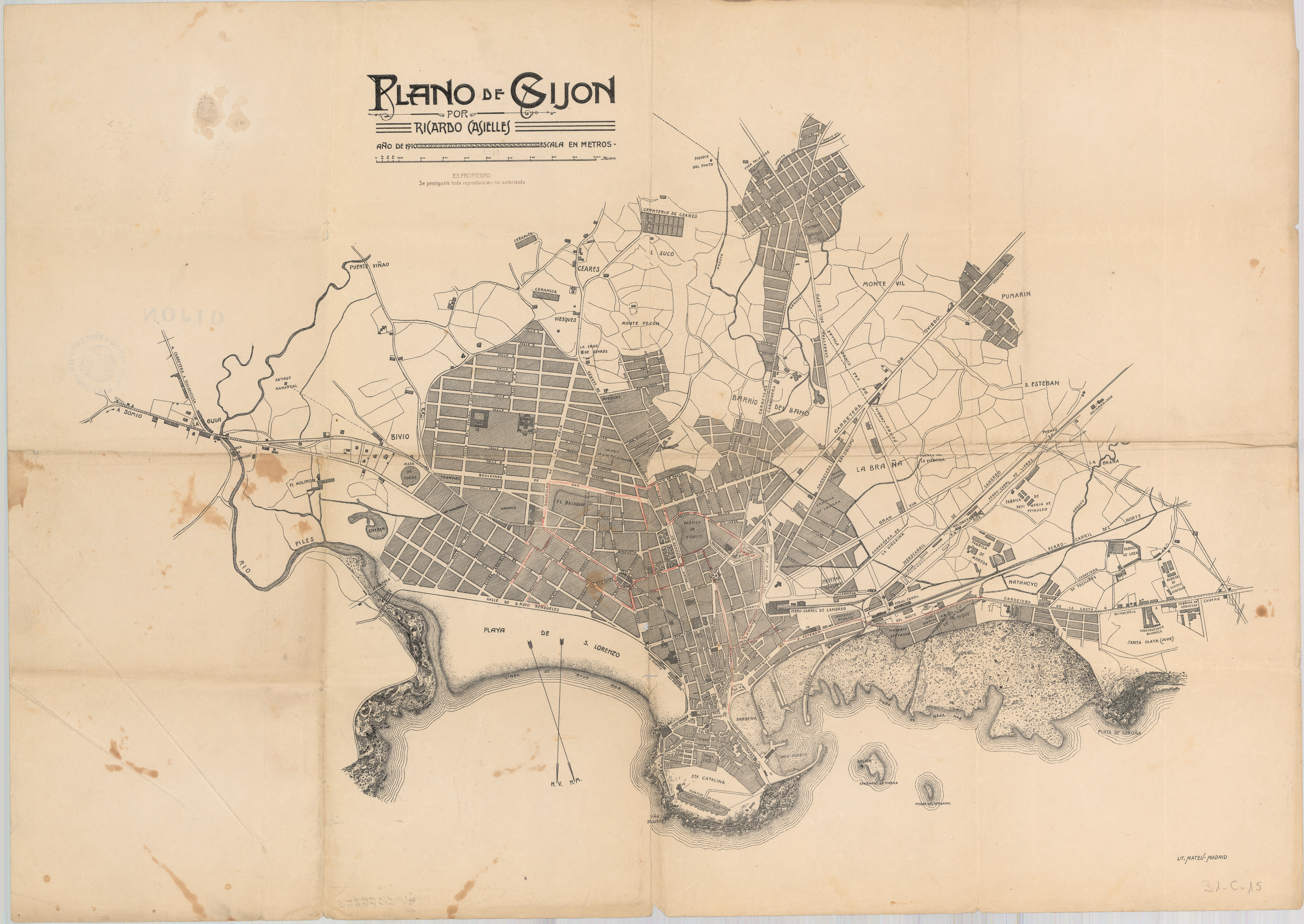
1910

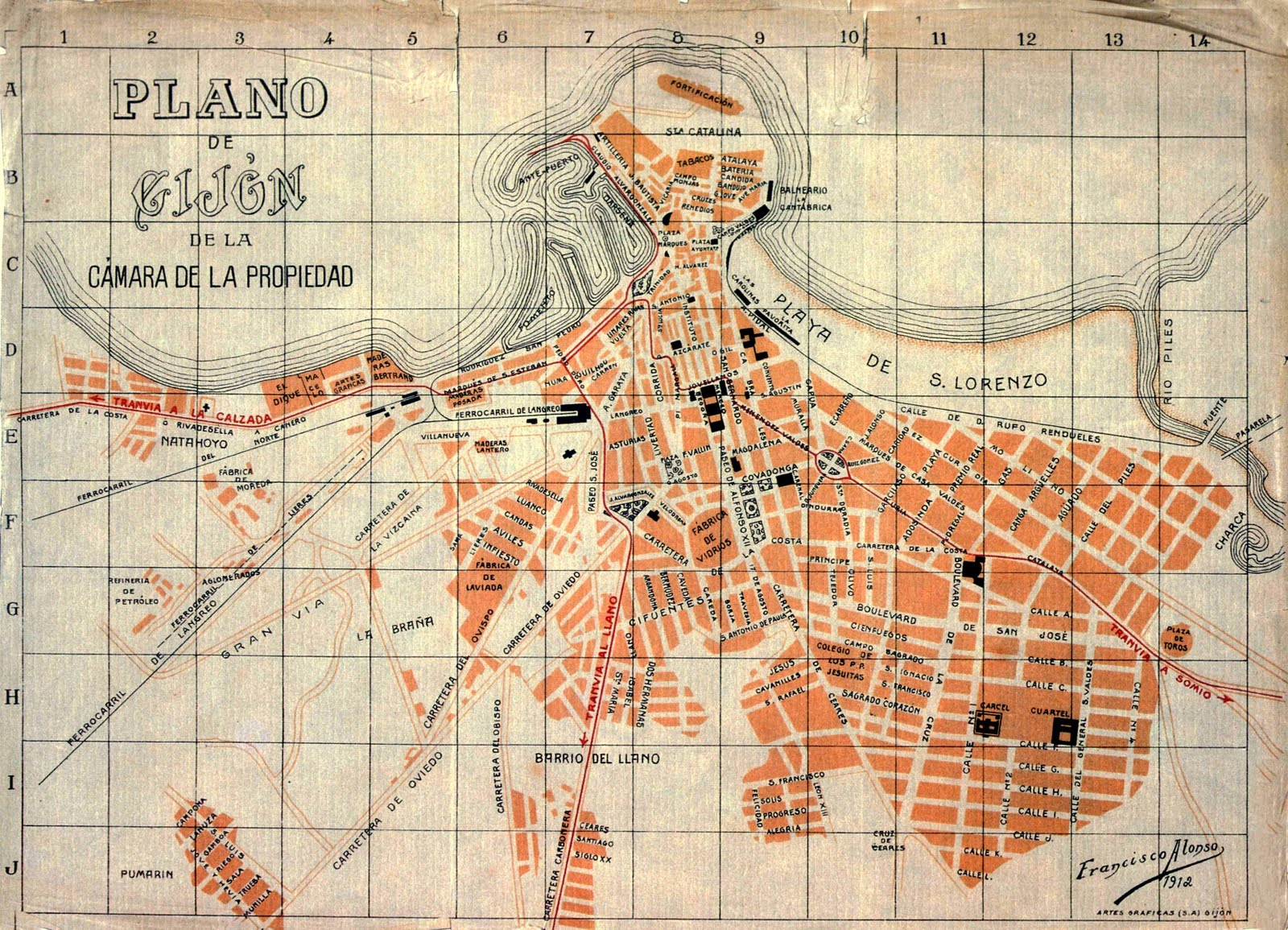
1912

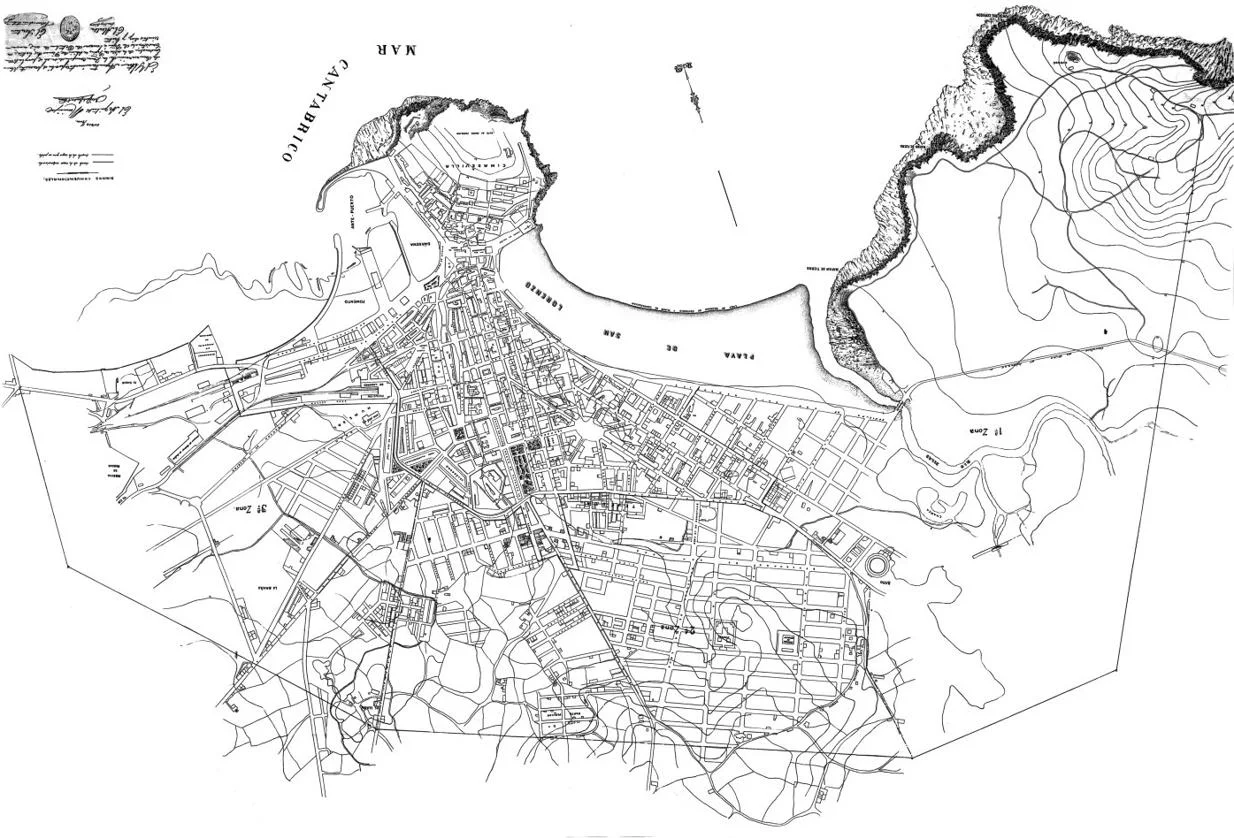
1913

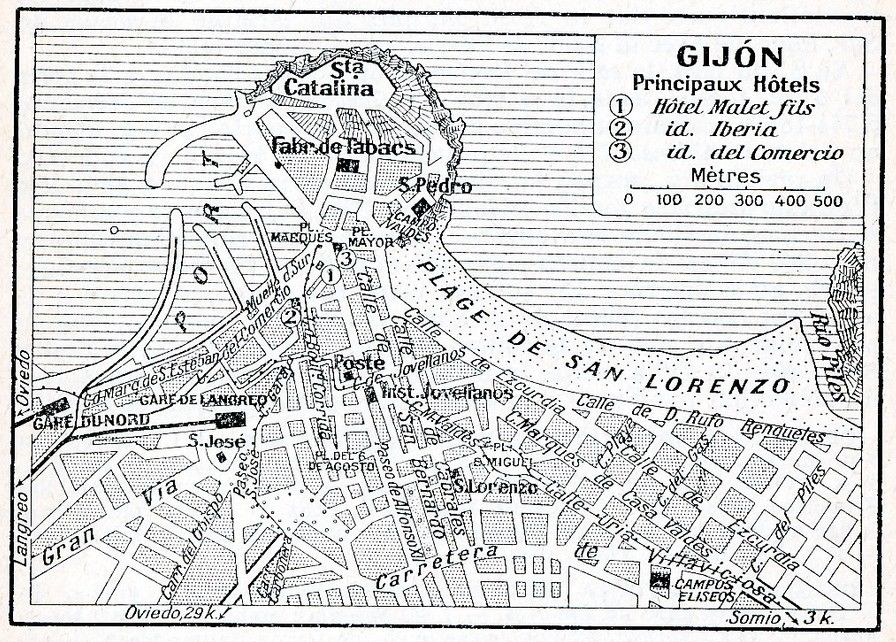
1915

1932

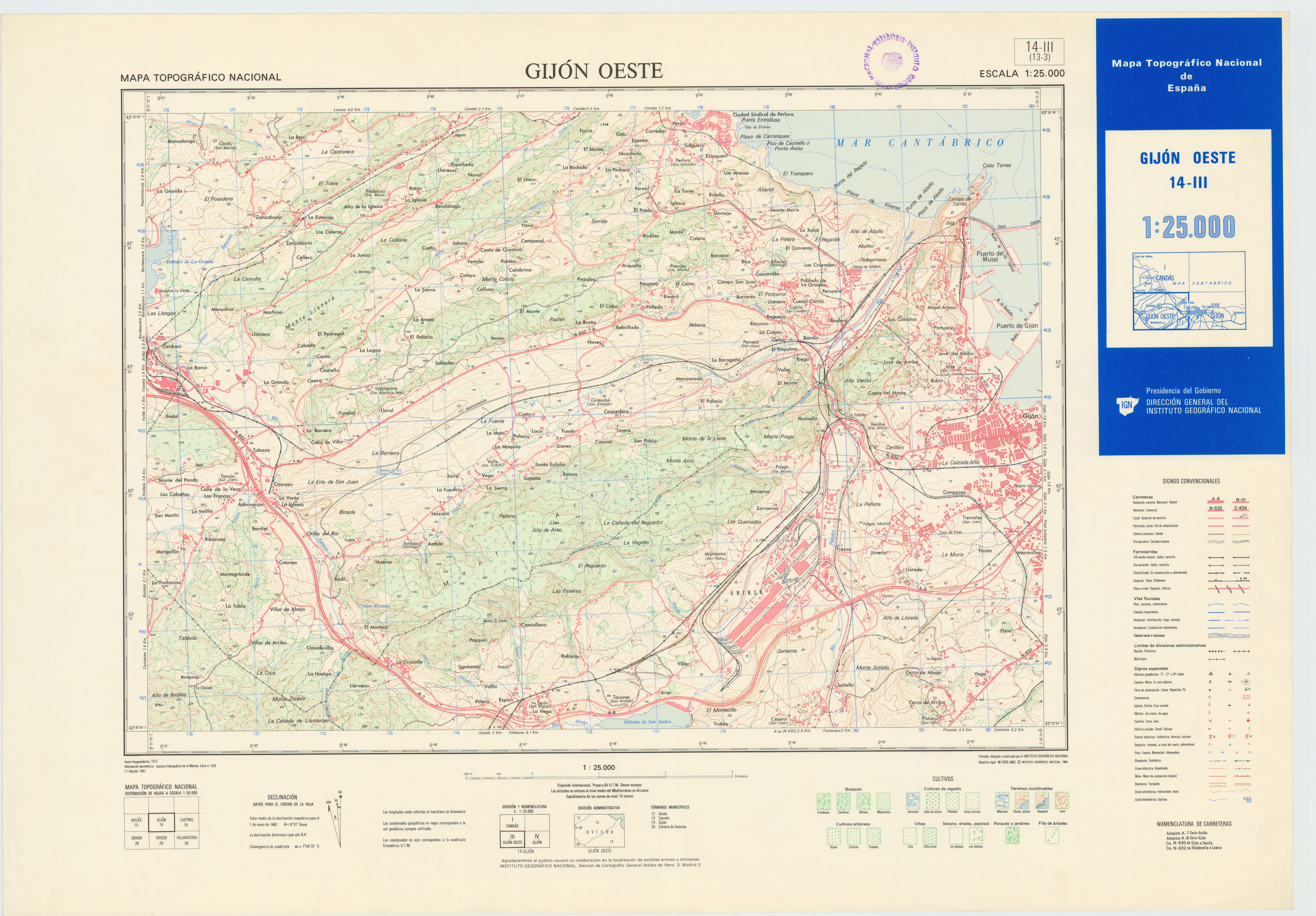
1981 (West)

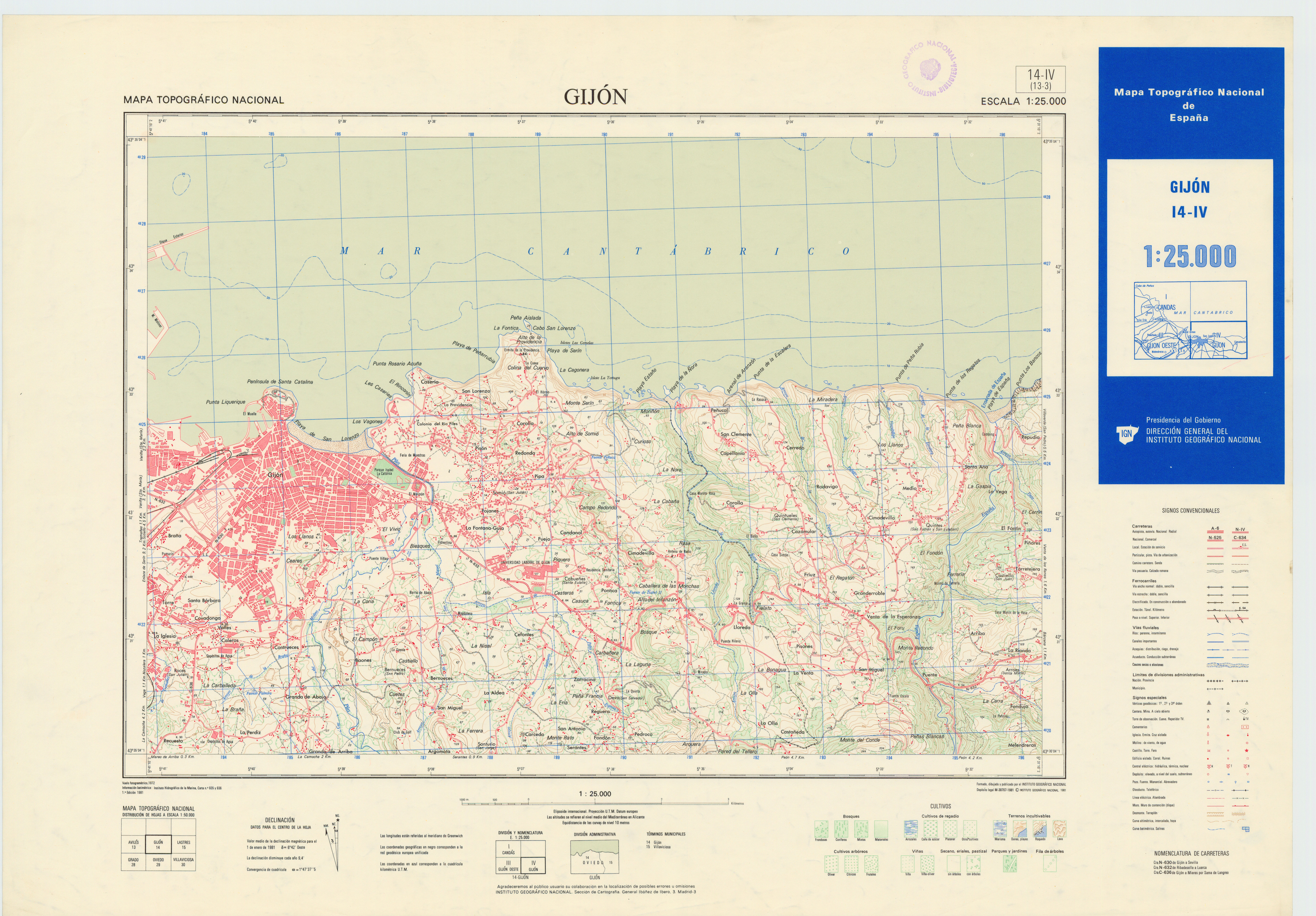
1981 (East)

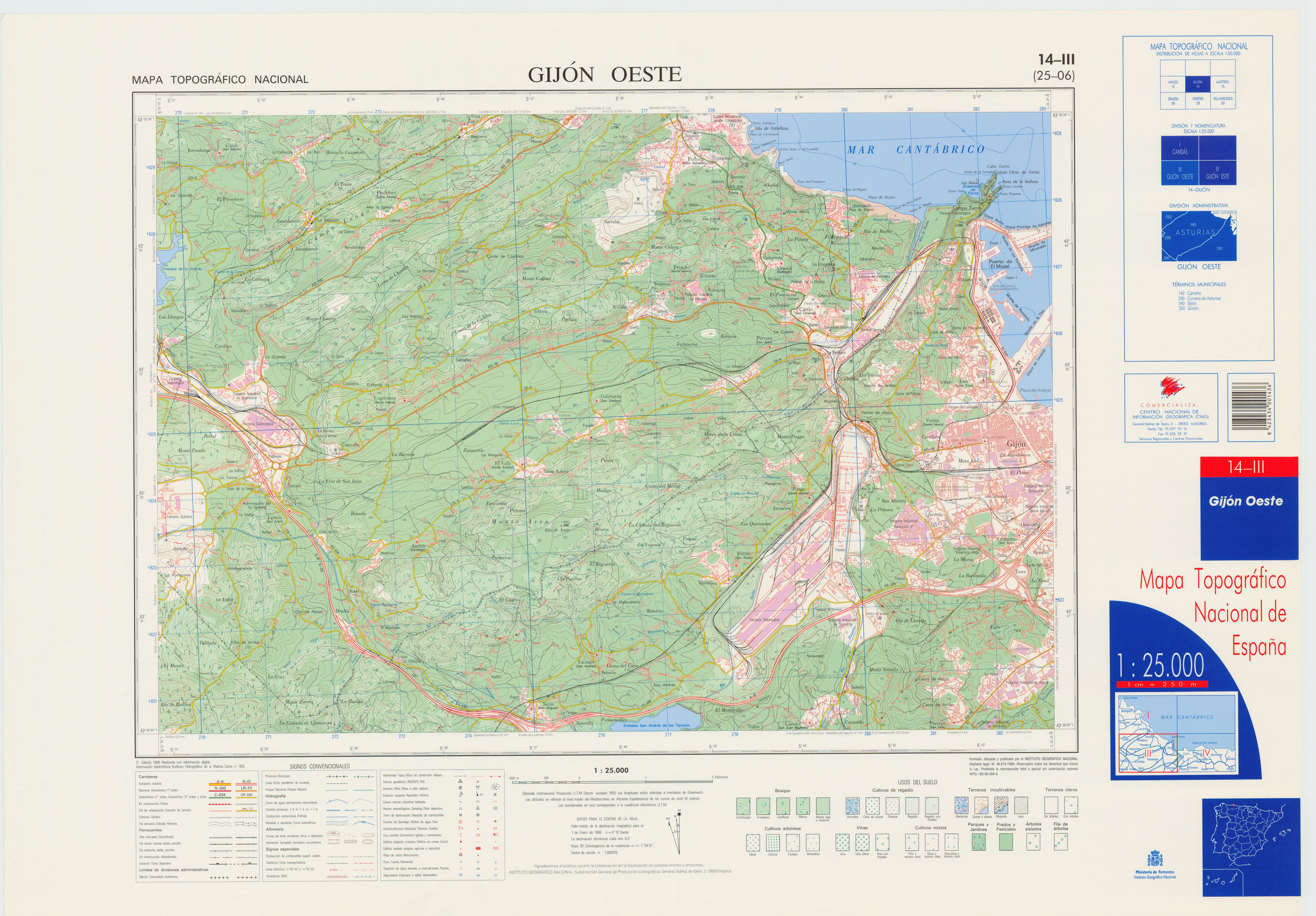
1999 (West)

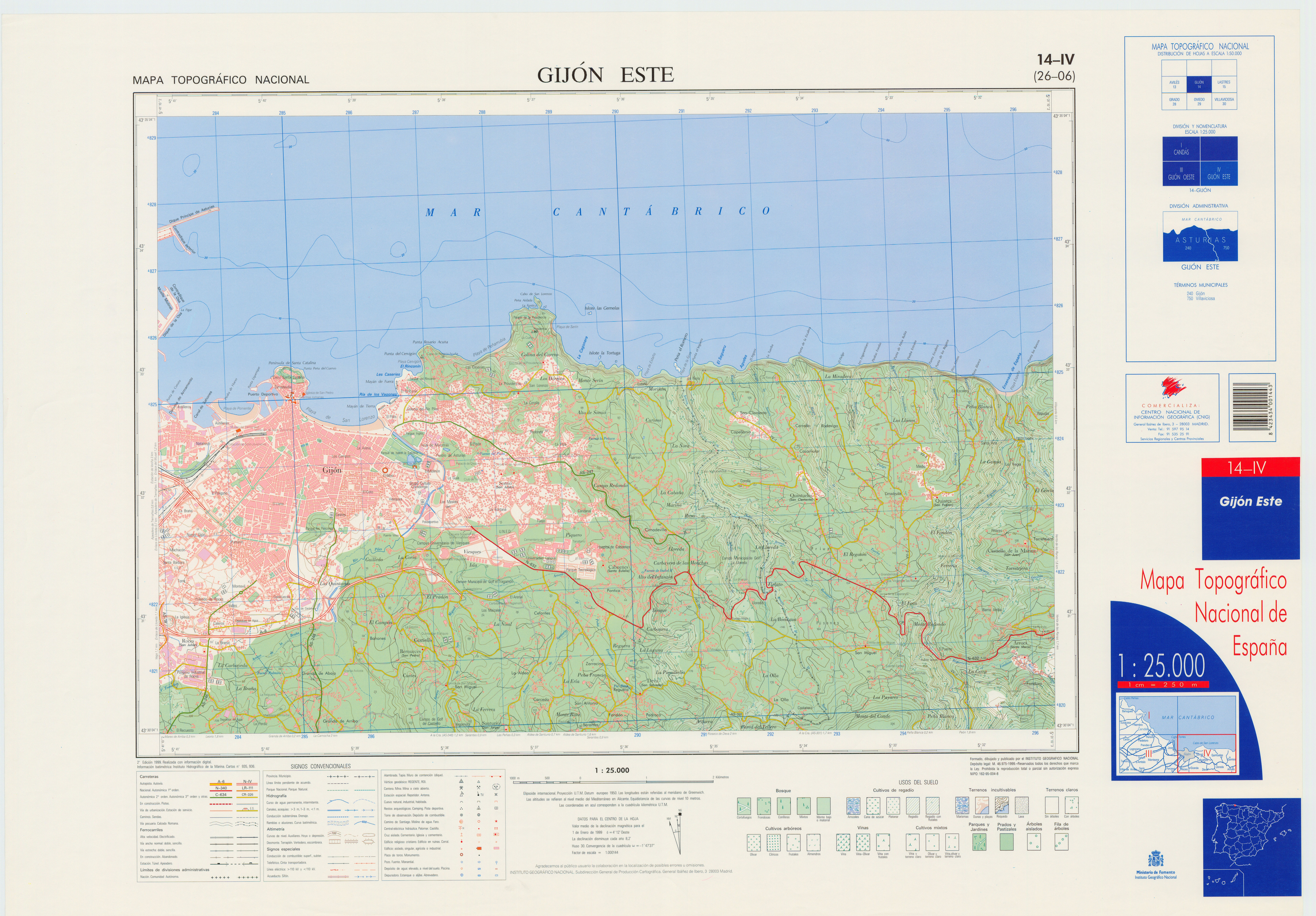
1999 (East)

=== 21st century ===
2010 (Center)

2010 (West)

2010 (East)

2010 (South)

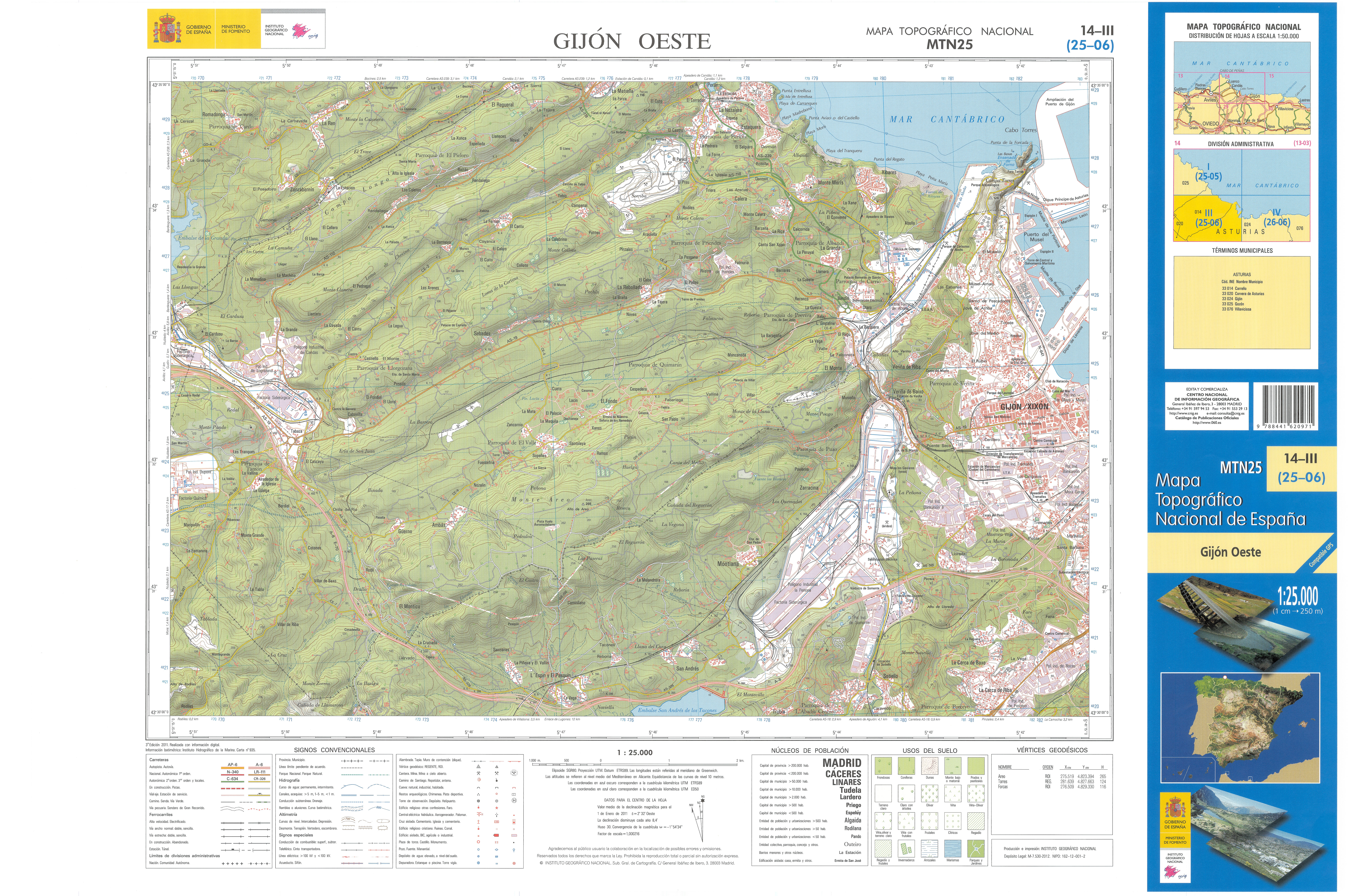
2011 (West)

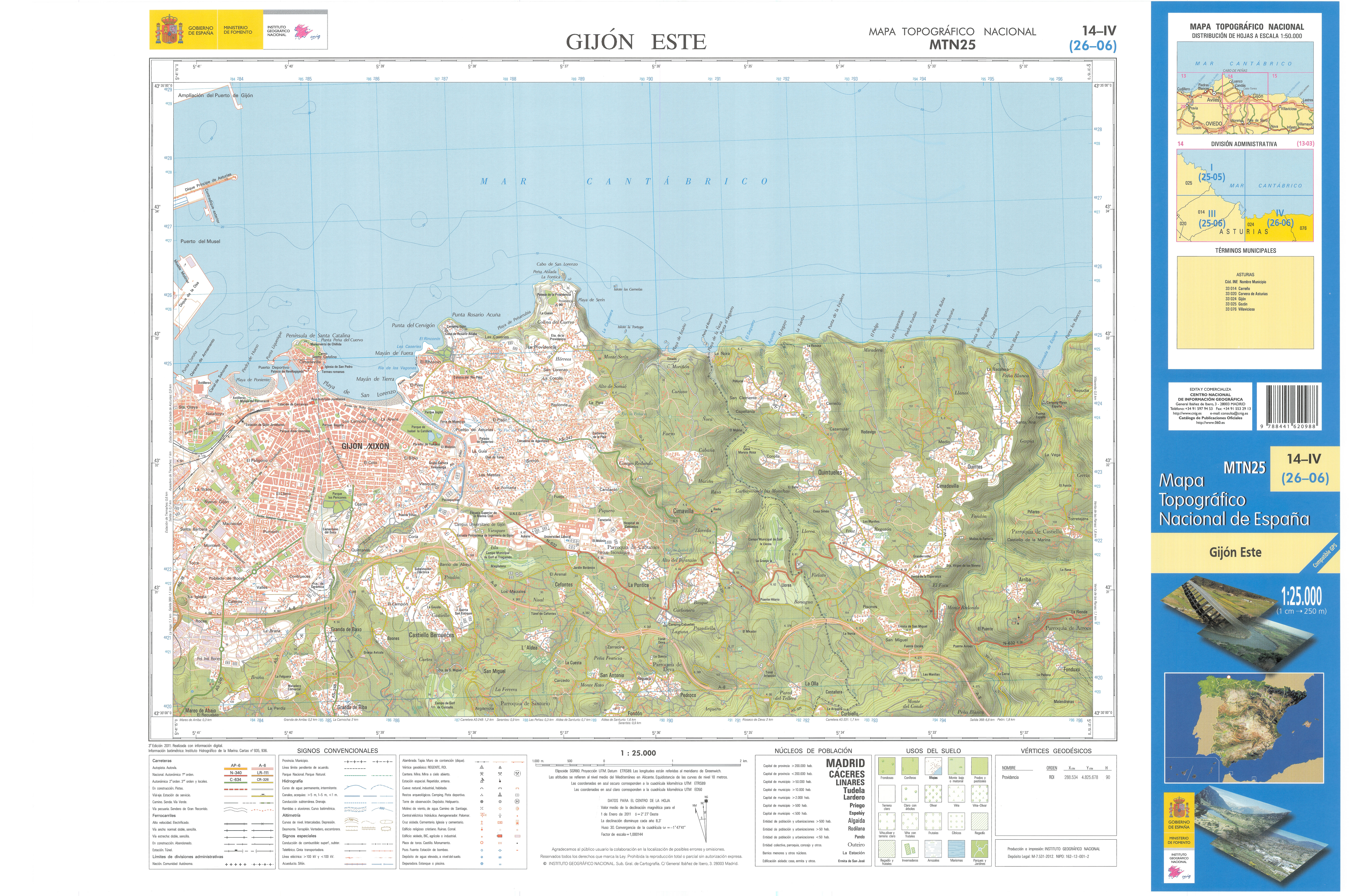
2011 (East)

== See also ==
- List of mayors of Gijon

Other cities in the autonomous community of Asturias:^{(es)}

- Timeline of Oviedo
- List of municipalities in Asturias

== Bibliography ==
- "Gijón" . Encyclopædia Britannica. Vol. 11 (11th ed.). 1910. p. 6.
- "Gijon", Spain and Portugal (4th ed.), Leipzig: Karl Baedeker, 1913, hdl:2027/uc2.ark:/13960/t5q81nw29 – via HathiTrust
- Trudy Ring, ed. (1995). "Gijon". Southern Europe. International Dictionary of Historic Places. Vol. 3. Fitzroy Dearborn. ISBN 1884964028.
