= Timeline of Oviedo =

The following is a timeline of the history of the city of Oviedo, Spain.

== Prior to 20th century ==
- 762 – Oviedo founded.^{(es)}
- 790s – Alfonso II of Asturias relocates his capital to Oviedo.
- 811 – Roman Catholic diocese of Oviedo established.
- 848 – San Miguel de Lillo church built on nearby Mount Naranco.
- 850 – Santa María del Naranco church built on Mount Naranco.
- 924 – Asturian capital relocated to León from Oviedo.
- 1145 – Fuero de Oviedo (law) created.
- 1258 – New city wall construction begins.
- 1388 – Oviedo Cathedral construction begins.
- 1521 – Fire.
- 1528 – Oviedo Cathedral tower built.
- 1574 – University of Oviedo established; classes begin in 1608.
- 1587
  - San Isidoro Church built.
  - Plaza del Fontán developed.
- 1670 – Teatro del Fontán (theatre) opens.
- 1671 – Casa consistorial de Oviedo (town hall) built on the Plaza Mayor.
- 1809 – Oviedo "plundered by the French" during the Peninsular War.
- 1810 – Oviedo "plundered by the French" again.
- 1842 – Population: 19,610.
- 1854 – Academia de Bellas Artes de San Salvador de Oviedo (art school) active.^{(es)}
- 1874 – Oviedo railway station opens.
- 1892 – Teatro Campoamor (theatre) opens.
- 1900
  - University's Extension Universitaria established "to educate the local working classes."
  - Population: 48,103.

== 20th century ==
- 1907 – Sociedad Filarmónica de Oviedo (musical group) founded.
- 1923 – Astur CF (football club) formed.
- 1926 – Real Oviedo (football club) formed.
- 1932 – Estadio de Buenavista (stadium) opens.
- 1934 – Fighting takes place in the city, in the context of the Spanish 1934 revolution. Among other people, young communist Aida Lafuente is killed.
- 1936 – Siege of Oviedo.
- 1937 – La Nueva España newspaper begins publication.
- 1940 – Population: 82,548.
- 1942 – Biblioteca Pública del Estado (Oviedo) (library) established.
- 1944
  - Teatro Filarmónica (theatre) opens.
  - Casa del Termómetro built on the Plaza de la Escandalera.
- 1950
  - Population: 106,002.
  - The Día de América en Asturias (America Day in Asturias) parade is held for the first time as part of the San Mateo festivities.
- 1956 – Archivo Histórico Provincial de Asturias (archives) established.
- 1960 – Population: 124,407.
- 1970 – Population: 152,453.
- 1975 – Palacio Municipal de Deportes de Oviedo (arena) opens.
- 1977 – Cámara Santa (Holy chamber, which is the chapel where Sudarium of Oviedo relic, thought to have covered the head of Jesus Christ after he died, is kept), at Oviedo Cathedral, is looted. Several important historical pieces, such as Cruz de los Ángeles (Angels Cross, symbol of Oviedo) and Victory Cross (symbol of Asturias), are stolen. Most of them would be recovered shortly after, but another pieces were not recovered until 1989, and some pieces never appeared.
- 1981
  - Population: 184,473.
  - Prince of Asturias Awards are held for the first time.
- 1982 – Part of 1982 FIFA World Cup football contest held in Oviedo.
- 1991
  - Population: 204,276.
  - Gabino de Lorenzo becomes mayor. He would remain in office until 2012.
- 1995 – Local television channel Oviedo Televisión opens. It would close down in 2011.
- 2000 – New Estadio Carlos Tartiere (stadium) opens.

== 21st century ==
- 2001 – Population: 201,154.
- 2003 – Estación de autobuses de Oviedo (bus depot) opens.
- 2011 – Population: 225,005.
- 2012 – Agustín Iglesias Caunedo becomes mayor.
- 2014 – New HUCA hospital (Hospital Universitario Central de Asturias, Central University Hospital of Asturias) begins operation. Old HUCA hospital had been created in 1989 by joining 2 nearby hospitals that had been operating since 1961 in the El Cristo neighbourhood.
- 2015
  - Wenceslao López Martínez becomes mayor.
  - Wikipedia receives in Oviedo the Princess of Asturias Award for International Cooperation.
- 2016 – On April 7, a fire completely destroys a building on Uría street (Oviedo's main street). 56-year-old firefighter Eloy Palacio Alonso died during the firefighting works, in which another firefighter was injured.
- 2019 – Alfredo Canteli becomes mayor.
- 2020 – Chilean writer Luis Sepúlveda dies in Oviedo, of COVID-19. He was the first COVID-19 case detected in Asturias.
- 2021 – Population: 217,164.
- 2026 – On November 10, a bomb attack in Villafría neighborhood kills a police officer and a police dog, and seriously injures a TEDAX officer. Previously, the attacker had shot and injured a young woman. Because of the attacker's profile, police considered that the attack was not terrorism-motivated. The attack caused a mass panic in the city, with multiple suspicious objects being inspected by police.

== Evolution of the Oviedo map ==
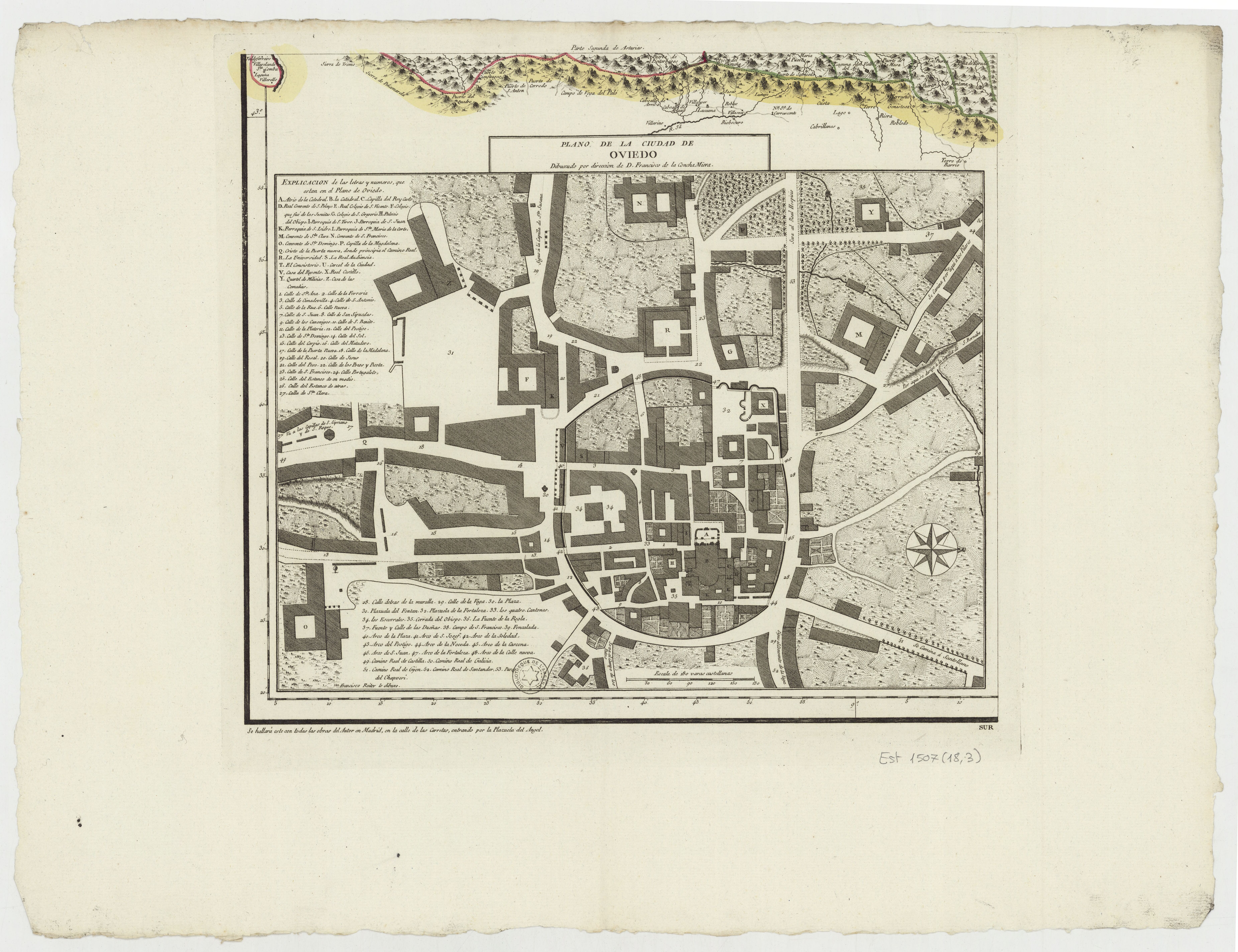
1777

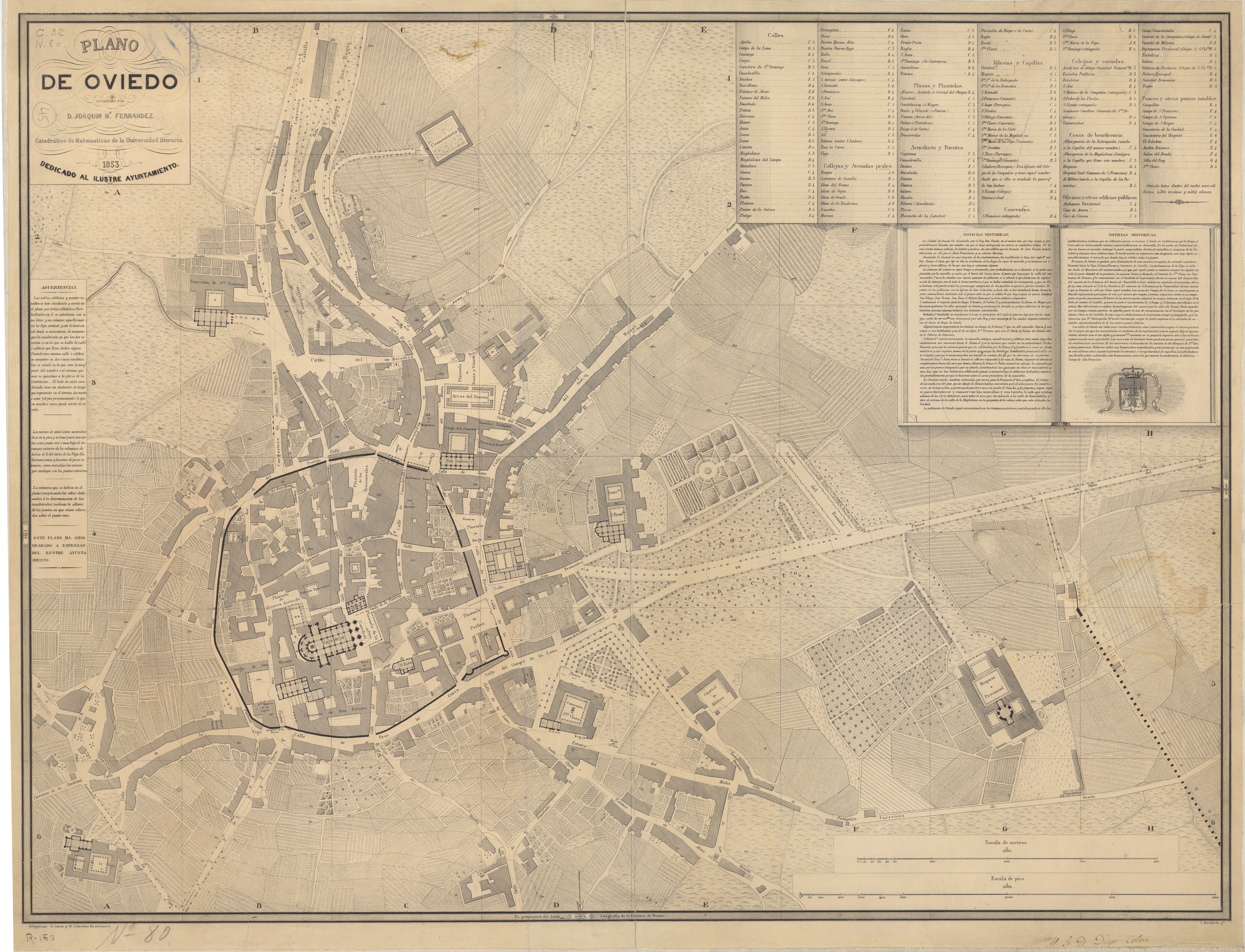
1853

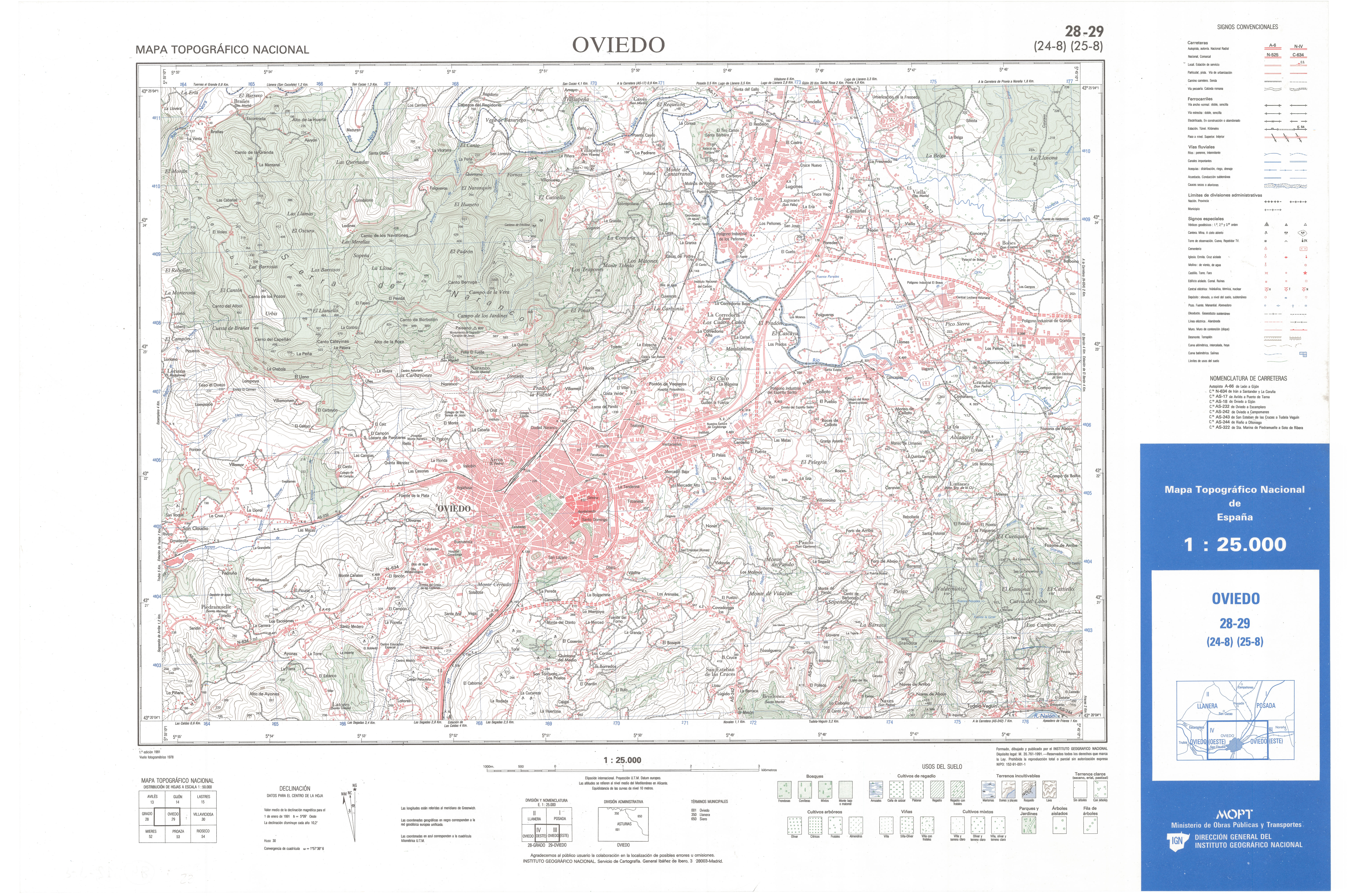
1991

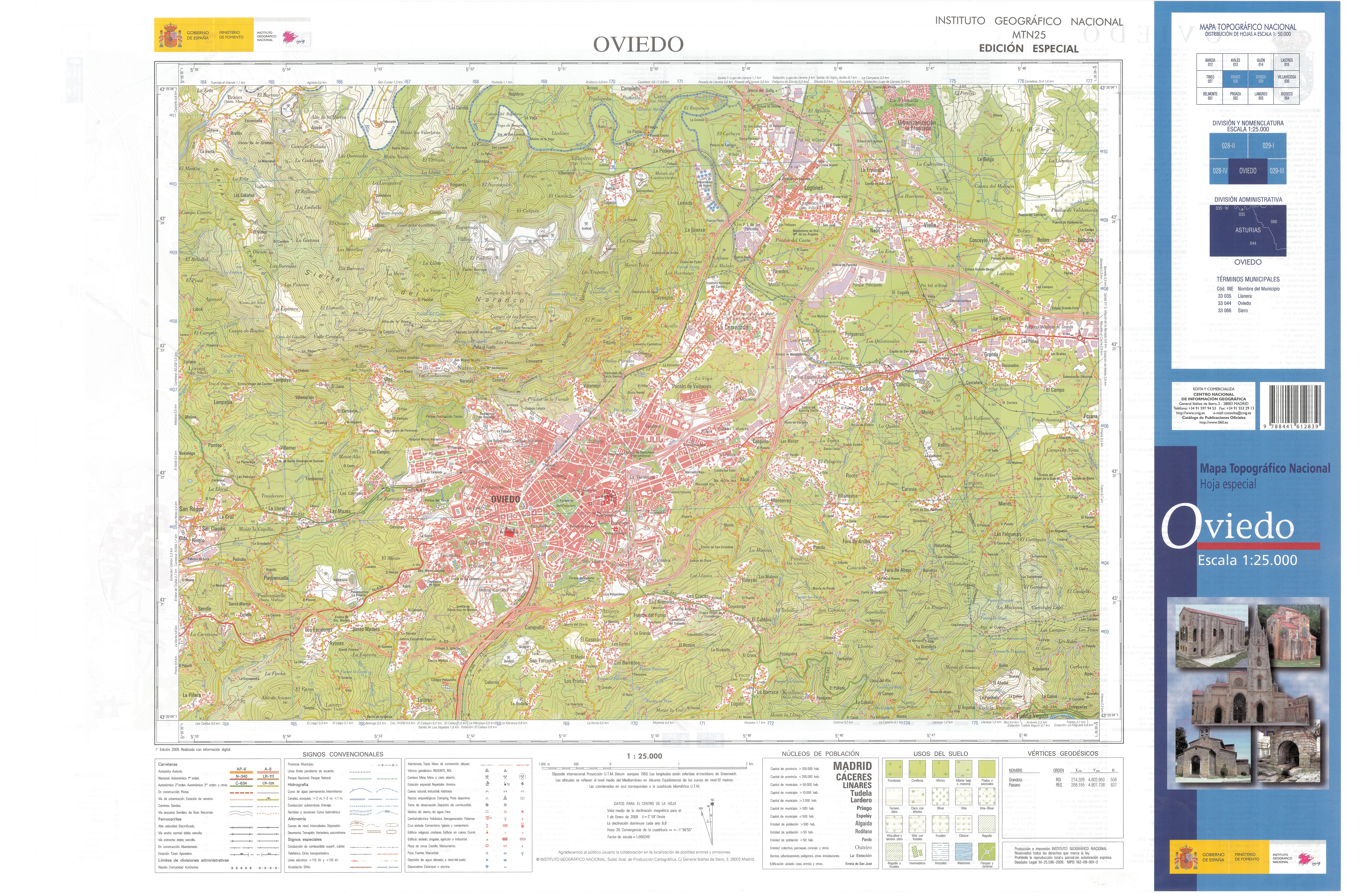
2009

2010 (Center)

2010 (West)

2010 (East)

== See also ==
- Oviedo history
- List of mayors of Oviedo

Other cities in the autonomous community of Asturias:^{(es)}

- Timeline of Gijón
- List of municipalities in Asturias

== Bibliography ==
=== in English ===
- Josiah Conder (1830), "Oviedo", The Modern Traveller, London: J.Duncan
- Richard Ford (1890), "Oviedo", Handbook for Travellers in Spain, vol. 1 (7th ed.), London: J. Murray, p. 212
- Albert F. Calvert (1908). Valladolid, Oviedo, Segovia, Zamora, Avil, & Zaragoza; an Historical & Descriptive Account. Spanish series. London: John Lane. hdl:2027/mdp.39015004743590.
- "Oviedo (city)" . Encyclopædia Britannica. Vol. 20 (11th ed.). 1910. pp. 390–391.
- "Oviedo", Spain and Portugal (4th ed.), Leipzig: Karl Baedeker, 1913, hdl:2027/uc2.ark:/13960/t5q81nw29 – via HathiTrust

=== in Spanish ===
- José María Quadrado [in Spanish] (1855). Asturias y León. Recuerdos y bellezas de España (in Spanish). Jose Repullés. hdl:2027/ucm.5325880353. (includes information about Oviedo)
- F. Cañellas Secades: El libro de Oviedo: Guía de la ciudad y su concejo (Oviedo, 1887)
- Francisco Quirós Linares (2005) [1978], "El crecimiento espacial de Oviedo (The spatial growth of Oviedo)", Estudios de geografía histórica e historia de la geografía: obra escogida (in Spanish), Ediciones de la Universidad de Oviedo, ISBN 9788483175200
